= Portuguese Colonial War =

1961–1974 wars of independence in Africa

Portuguese Colonial War Guerra Colonial Portuguesa
- Part of the Cold War and the decolonisation of Africa
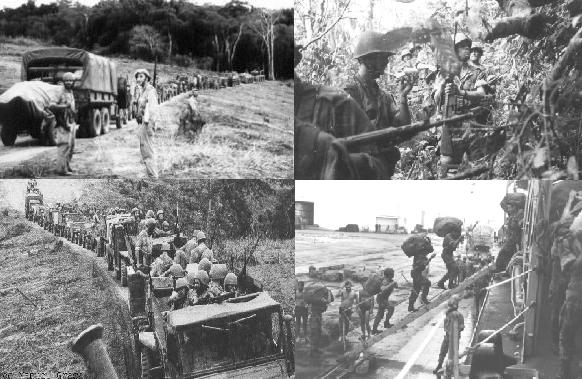
- Portuguese convoy in Angola; Soldiers patrolling the forest; Trucks in northern Angola; Troops boarding a frigate in Guinea-Bissau
Date	4 February 1961 – 25 April 1974 (13 years, 2 months and 3 weeks)
Location	Portuguese Africa (Angola, Guinea, and Mozambique)
Result	Carnation Revolution: Military stalemate; Rebel political victory; Alvor Agreement; Algiers Accord; Lusaka Accord
Territorial changes	Portuguese overseas territories in Africa become independent

Belligerents
Portugal	Angola: MPLA; FNLA; UNITA; Guinea: PAIGC; Mozambique: (Mozambique) FRELIMO

Commanders and leaders
António Salazar #; (Estado Novo (Portugal)) Marcelo Caetano; (Estado Novo (Portugal)) Américo Tomás; Angola: (Estado Novo (Portugal)) Venâncio Augusto Deslandes; (Estado Novo (Portugal)) Alberto de Andrade e Silva; (Estado Novo (Portugal)) Silvino Silvério Marques; (Estado Novo (Portugal)) Francisco Gomes; (Estado Novo (Portugal)) Joaquim da Luz Cunha; Guinea: (Estado Novo (Portugal)) Fernando Louro de Sousa; (Estado Novo (Portugal)) Arnaldo Schultz; (Estado Novo (Portugal)) António de Spínola; (Estado Novo (Portugal)) Bettencourt Rodrigues; Mozambique: (Estado Novo (Portugal)) João Caeiro Carrasco; (Estado Novo (Portugal)) Augusto dos Santos; (Estado Novo (Portugal)) Kaúlza de Arriaga; (Estado Novo (Portugal)) Basto Machado	Angola: Agostinho Neto; José dos Santos; Lúcio Lara; Holden Roberto; Jonas Savimbi; Guinea: Amílcar Cabral X; Luís Cabral; Aristides Pereira; João Bernardo Vieira; Mozambique: (Mozambique) Samora Machel; (Mozambique) Eduardo Mondlane X; (Mozambique) Joaquim Chissano; (Mozambique) Marcelino dos Santos

Strength
1,400,000 total men mobilized for military and civilian support service: 400,000 native African soldiers mobilized; Average of 107,000 men deployed every year.	40,000–60,000 guerrillas: 27,000 in Angola; 10–15,000 in Mozambique; 10,000 in Portuguese Guinea

Casualties and losses
36,750 casualties: 8,831 killed; 6,338 from mainland Portugal; 2,493 from Africa; 27,919 wounded	~41,000+ casualties: 41–46,000 killed; 25–30,000 in Angola; 10,000 in Mozambique; 6,000 in Portuguese Guinea
- Civilians killed: 70,000–110,000: 30–50,000 killed in Angola; 30–50,000 killed in Mozambique; 5,000 killed in Guinea; 2,000 white settlers killed; 7,447 Portuguese African troops executed by PAIGC after the war; 300,000+ Portuguese nationals expelled (24/20 order)

The Portuguese Colonial War (Portuguese: Guerra Colonial Portuguesa), also known in Portugal as the Overseas War (Guerra do Ultramar) or in the former colonies as the War of Liberation (Guerra de Libertação), and also known as the Angolan, Guinea-Bissau and Mozambican Wars of Independence, was a 13-year-long conflict fought between Portugal's military and the emerging nationalist movements in Portugal's African colonies between 1961 and 1974. The Portuguese regime at the time, the Estado Novo, was overthrown by a military coup in 1974, and the change in government brought the conflict to an end. The war was a decisive ideological struggle in Lusophone Africa, surrounding nations, and mainland Portugal.

Unlike other European nations during the 1950s and 1960s, the Portuguese Estado Novo regime did not withdraw from its African territories. During the 1960s, various armed independence movements became active such as the People's Movement for the Liberation of Angola, National Liberation Front of Angola, National Union for the Total Independence of Angola, African Party for the Independence of Guinea and Cape Verde, and the Mozambique Liberation Front. During the ensuing conflict, atrocities were committed by all forces involved. Throughout the period, Portugal faced increasing dissent, arms embargoes, and other punitive sanctions imposed by the international community, including by some Western Bloc governments, either intermittently or continuously. The anti-colonial guerrillas and movements of Portuguese Africa were heavily supported with money, weapons, training and diplomatic lobbying by the Communist Bloc which had the Soviet Union as its lead nation. By 1973, the war had become increasingly unpopular due to its length and financial costs, the worsening of diplomatic relations with other United Nations members, and the role it had always played as a factor of perpetuation of the entrenched Estado Novo regime and the nondemocratic status quo in Portugal.

The end of the war came with the Carnation Revolution military coup of April 1974 in mainland Portugal and was followed by the Ongoing Revolutionary Process. The withdrawal resulted in the expulsion of hundreds of thousands of Portuguese citizens plus military personnel of European, African, and mixed ethnicity from the former Portuguese territories and newly independent African nations. This migration is regarded as one of the largest peaceful, if forced, migrations in the world's history, although most of the migrants fled the former Portuguese territories as destitute refugees.

The former Portuguese territories in Africa became sovereign states, with Agostinho Neto in Angola, Samora Machel in Mozambique, Luís Cabral in Guinea-Bissau, Manuel Pinto da Costa in São Tomé and Príncipe, and Aristides Pereira in Cape Verde as the heads of state. Devastating civil wars followed in Angola and Mozambique, which lasted several decades, claimed millions of lives, and resulted in large numbers of displaced refugees. Angola and Mozambique established state-planned economies after independence, and struggled with inefficient judicial systems and bureaucracies, corruption, poverty and unemployment. A level of social order and economic development comparable to what had existed under Portuguese rule, including during the period of the Colonial War, became the goal of the independent territories.

== Political context ==
=== 15th century ===
When the Portuguese began trading on the west coast of Africa in the 15th century, they concentrated their energies on Guinea and Angola. Hoping at first for gold, they soon found that slaves were the most valuable commodity available in the region for export. The Islamic Empire was already well-established in the African slave trade, for centuries linking it to the Arab slave trade. However, the Portuguese who had conquered the Islamic port of Ceuta in 1415, and several other towns in current-day Morocco in a Crusade against Islamic neighbors, managed to successfully establish themselves in the area.

In Guinea, rival European powers had established control over the trade routes in the region, while local African rulers confined the Portuguese to the coast. These rulers then sent enslaved Africans to the Portuguese ports, or to forts in Africa from where they were exported. Thousands of kilometers down the coast, in Angola, the Portuguese found consolidating their early advantage in establishing hegemony over the region even harder, due to the encroachment of Dutch traders. Nevertheless, the fortified Portuguese towns of Luanda (established in 1587 with 400 Portuguese settlers) and Benguela (a fort from 1587, a town from 1617) remained almost continuously in Portuguese hands.

As in Guinea, the slave trade became the basis of the local economy in Angola. Excursions traveled ever farther inland to procure captives who were sold by African rulers; the primary source of these slaves were those captured as a result of losing a war or interethnic skirmish with other African tribes. More than a million men, women, and children were shipped from Angola across the Atlantic. In this region, unlike Guinea, the trade remained largely in Portuguese hands. Nearly all the slaves were destined for the Portuguese colony of Brazil.

In Mozambique, reached in the 15th century by Portuguese sailors searching for a maritime spice trade route, the Portuguese settled along the coast and made their way into the hinterland as sertanejos (backwoodsmen). These sertanejos lived alongside Swahili traders and even obtained employment among Shona kings as interpreters and political advisers. One such sertanejo managed to travel through almost all the Shona kingdoms, including the Mutapa Empire's (Mwenemutapa) metropolitan district, between 1512 and 1516.

By the 1530s, small bands of Portuguese traders and prospectors penetrated the interior regions seeking gold, where they set up garrisons and trading posts at Sena and Tete on the Zambezi River and tried to establish a monopoly over the gold trade. The Portuguese finally entered into direct relations with the Mwenemutapa in the 1560s. However, the Portuguese traders and explorers settled in the coastal strip with greater success, and established strongholds safe from their main rivals in East Africa – the Omani Arabs, including those of Zanzibar.

=== Scramble for Africa and the World Wars ===
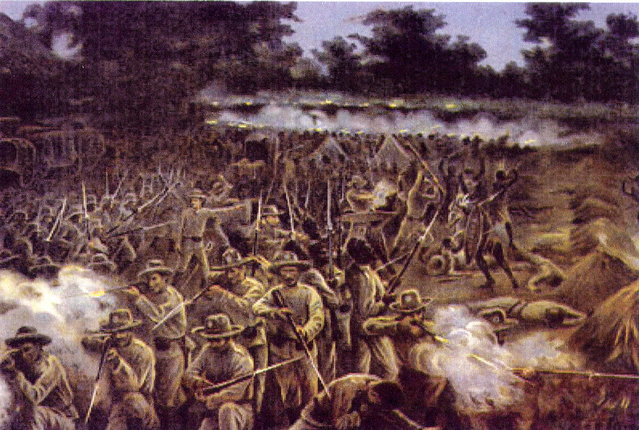
The Battle of Marracuene in 1895

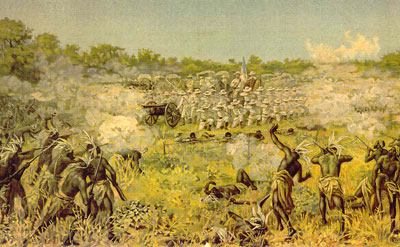
The Battle of Coolela in 1895

Portugal's colonial claim to the region was recognized by the other European powers during the 1880s, during the Scramble for Africa, and the final boundaries of Portuguese Africa were agreed by negotiation in Europe in 1891. At the time, Portugal was in effective control of little more than the coastal strip of both Angola and Mozambique, but important inroads into the interior had been made since the first half of the 19th century. In Angola, construction of a railway from Luanda to Malanje, in the fertile highlands, was started in 1885.

Work began in 1903 on a commercially significant line from Benguela all the way inland to the Katanga region, aiming to provide access to the sea for the richest mining district of the Belgian Congo. The line reached the Congo border in 1928. In 1914, both Angola and Mozambique had Portuguese army garrisons of around 2,000 men, African troops led by European officers. With the outbreak of World War I in 1914, Portugal sent reinforcements to both colonies, because the fighting in the neighboring German African colonies was expected to spill over the borders into its territories.

After Germany declared war on Portugal in March 1916, the Portuguese government sent more reinforcements to Mozambique (the South Africans had captured German South West Africa in 1915). These troops supported British, South African and Belgian military operations against German colonial forces in German East Africa. In December 1917, German colonial forces led by Colonel Paul von Lettow-Vorbeck invaded Mozambique from German East Africa. Portuguese, British and Belgian forces spent all of 1918 chasing Lettow-Vorbeck and his men across Mozambique, German East Africa and Northern Rhodesia. Portugal sent a total of 40,000 reinforcements to Angola and Mozambique during World War I.

By this time, the regime in Portugal had been through two major political upheavals—from monarchy to republic in 1910 and then to a military dictatorship after a coup in 1926. These changes resulted in a tightening of Portuguese control in Angola. In the early years of the expanded colony, near-constant warfare was occurring between the Portuguese and the various African rulers of the region. A systematic campaign of conquest and pacification was undertaken by the Portuguese. One by one, the local kingdoms were overwhelmed and abolished.

By the middle of the 1920s, the whole of Angola was under control. Slavery had officially ended in Portuguese Africa, but the plantations were worked on a system of paid serfdom by African labour composed of the large majority of ethnic Africans who did not have resources to pay Portuguese taxes and were considered unemployed by the authorities. After World War II and the first decolonization events, this system gradually declined, but paid forced labor, including labor contracts with forced relocation of people, continued in many regions of Portuguese Africa until it was finally abolished in 1961.

=== Post-World War II ===
In the late 1950s, the Portuguese Armed Forces saw themselves confronted with the paradox generated by the dictatorial regime of the Estado Novo that had been in power since 1933; on one hand, the policy of Portuguese neutrality in World War II placed the Portuguese Armed Forces out of the way of a possible East-West conflict; on the other, the regime felt the increased responsibility of keeping Portugal's vast overseas territories under control and protecting the citizenry there. Portugal joined the military alliance, NATO, as a founding member in 1949, and was integrated within the various fledgling military commands of NATO.

NATO's focus on preventing a conventional Soviet attack against Western Europe was to the detriment of military preparations against guerrilla uprisings in Portugal's overseas provinces that were considered essential for the survival of the Portuguese state. The integration of Portugal in NATO resulted in the formation of a military élite who were critical in the planning and implementation of operations during the Overseas War. This "NATO generation" ascended quickly to the highest political positions and military command without having to provide evidence of loyalty to the regime.

The Colonial War established a split between the military structure – heavily influenced by the western powers with democratic governments – and the political power of the regime. Some analysts see the "Botelho Moniz coup" of 1961 (also known as A Abrilada) against the Portuguese government and backed by the U.S. administration, as the beginning of this rupture, the origin of a lapse on the part of the regime to keep up a unique command center, an armed force prepared for threats of conflict in the colonies. This situation caused, as was verified later, a lack of coordination between the three general staffs (Army, Air Force, and Navy).

The FNLA, which was headed by Holden Roberto, attacked Portuguese settlers and Africans living in northern Angola from its bases in Congo-Léopoldville. Many of the victims were African farm workers living under labor contracts that required seasonal relocation from the desertified Southwest and Bailundo areas of Angola. Photos of Africans killed by the FLNA, which included photos of decapitated civilians, men, women and children of both white and black ethnicity, was later displayed in the UN by Portuguese diplomats. The emergence of labor strikes, attacks by newly organized guerrilla movements, and the Santa Maria hijacking by Henrique Galvão began a path to open warfare in Angola.

According to historical researchers such as José Freire Antunes, U.S. President John F. Kennedy sent a message to President António de Oliveira Salazar advising Portugal to abandon its African colonies shortly after the outbreak of violence in 1961. Instead, after a coup led by pro-U.S. forces failed to depose him, Salazar consolidated power and immediately sent reinforcements to the overseas territories, setting the stage for continued conflict in Angola. Similar situations played out in other overseas Portuguese territories.

== Multiethnic societies, competing ideologies, and armed conflict in Portuguese Africa ==
Ethnic map of Angola (in 1970)

By the 1950s, the European mainland Portuguese territory was inhabited by a society that was poorer and had a much higher illiteracy rate than the average Western European societies or those of North America. It was ruled by an authoritarian and conservative right-leaning dictatorship, known as the Estado Novo regime. By this time, the Estado Novo regime ruled both the Portuguese mainland and several centuries-old overseas territories as theoretically co-equal departments. The possessions were Angola, Cape Verde, Macau, Mozambique, Portuguese Guinea, Portuguese India, Portuguese Timor, the Fort of São João Baptista de Ajudá, and São Tomé and Príncipe.

In reality, the relation of mainland Portuguese to their overseas possessions was that of colonial administrator to a subservient colony. Political, legislative, administrative, commercial, and other institutional relations between the colonies and Portugal-based individuals and organizations were numerous, though migration to, from, and between Portugal and its overseas departments was limited in size, due principally to the long distance and low annual income of the average Portuguese and that of the indigenous overseas populations.

An increasing number of African anticolonial movements called for total independence of the overseas African territories from Portugal. Some, like the UPA wanted national self-determination, while others wanted a new form of government based on Marxist principles. Portuguese leaders, including Salazar, attempted to stave off calls for independence by defending a policy of assimilation, multiracialism, and civilising mission, or lusotropicalism, as a way of integrating Portuguese colonies, and their peoples, more closely with Portugal itself.

For the Portuguese ruling regime, the overseas empire was a matter of national interest, to be preserved at all costs. As far back as 1919, a Portuguese delegate to the International Labour Conference in Geneva declared: "The assimilation of the so-called inferior races, by cross-breeding, by means of the Christian religion, by the mixing of the most widely divergent elements; freedom of access to the highest offices of state, even in Europe – these are the principles which have always guided Portuguese colonisation in Asia, in Africa, in the Pacific, and previously in America."

As late as the 1950s, the policy of "colorblind" access and mixing of races did not extend to all of Portugal's African territories, particularly Mozambique, where in tune with other minority white regimes of the day in Southern Africa, the territory was segregated along racial lines. Strict qualification criteria ensured that fewer than one in 100 black Mozambicans became full Portuguese citizens.

=== Settlement subsidies ===
Numerous subsidies were offered by the Estado Novo regime to those Portuguese who agreed to settle in Angola or Mozambique, including a special premium for each Portuguese man who agreed to marry an African woman. Salazar himself was fond of restating the old Portuguese policy maxim that any indigenous resident of Portugal's African territories was, in theory, eligible to become a member of Portuguese government, even its president. In practice, this never took place, though trained black Africans living in Portugal's overseas African possessions were allowed to occupy positions in a variety of areas including the military, civil service, clergy, education, and private business—providing they had the requisite education and technical skills.

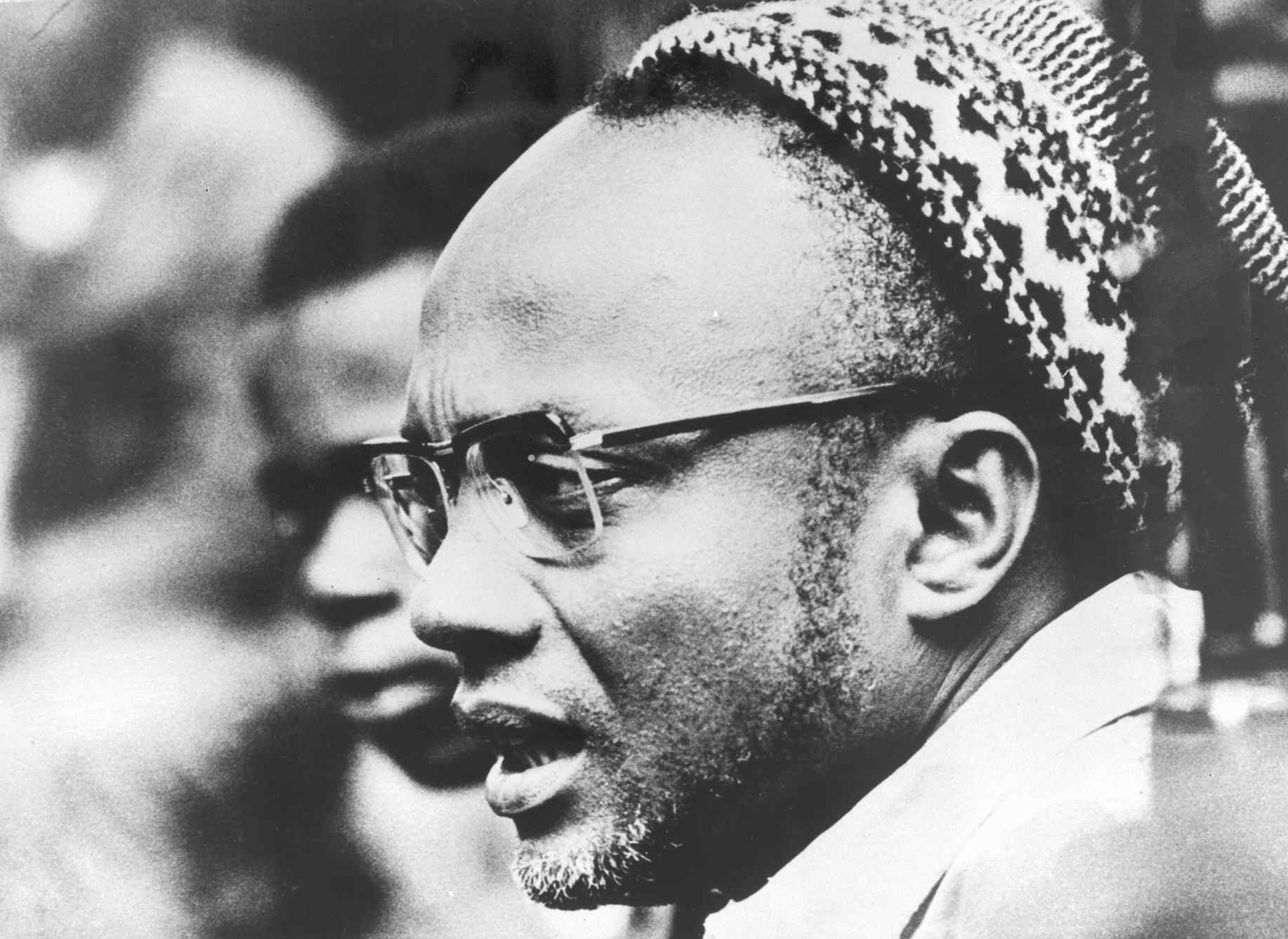
Cabo Verdean and Bissau-Guinean revolutionary Amílcar Cabral: In his formative years, he was awarded an agronomy degree by the Instituto Superior de Agronomia, in Lisbon.

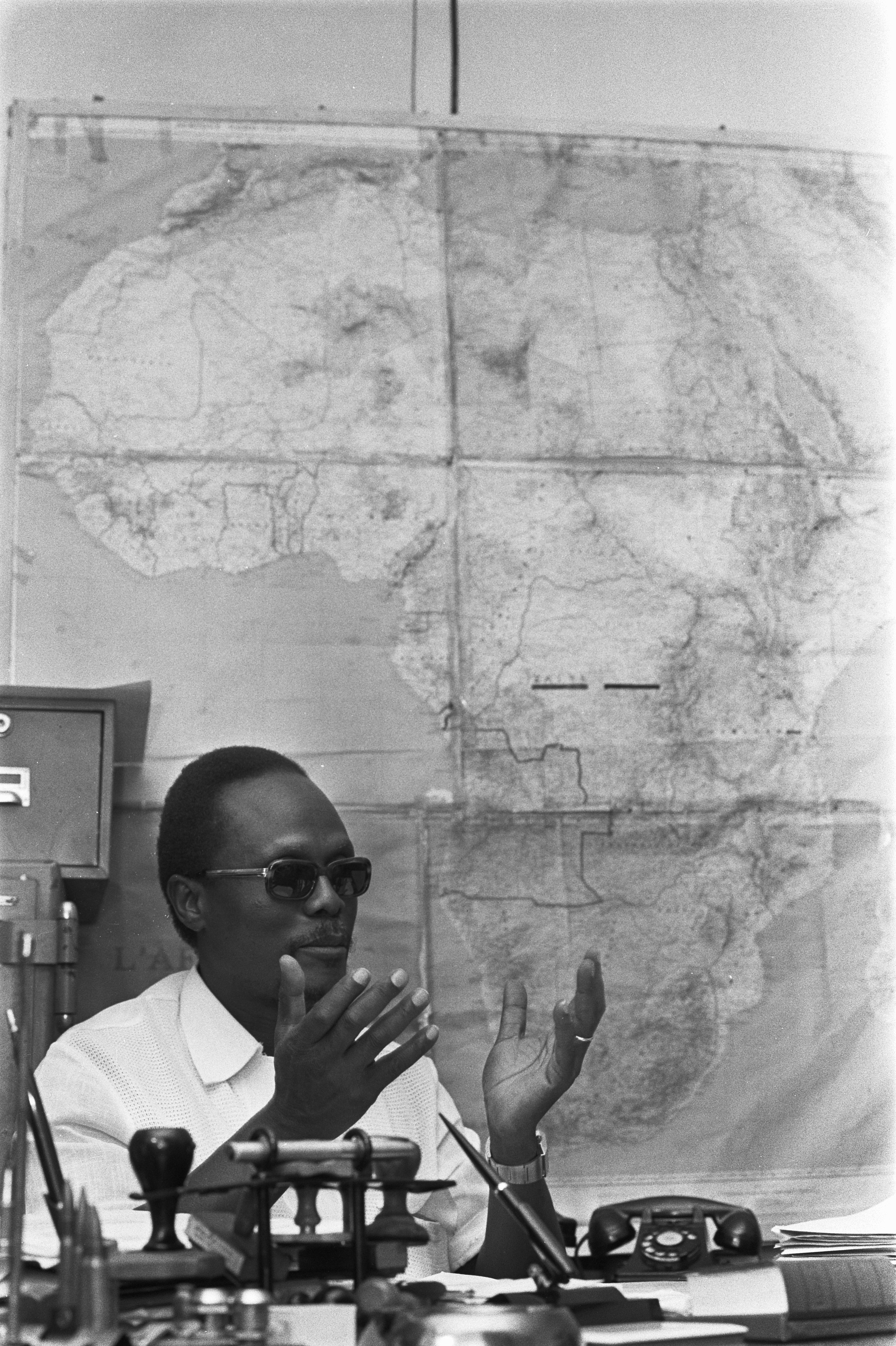
Leader of FNLA Holden Roberto in 1973

While access to basic, secondary, and technical education remained poor until the 1960s, a few Africans were able to attend schools locally or in some cases in Portugal itself. This resulted in the advancement of certain black Portuguese Africans who became prominent individuals during the war and its aftermath, including Samora Machel, Mário Pinto de Andrade, Marcelino dos Santos, Eduardo Mondlane, Agostinho Neto, Amílcar Cabral, Jonas Savimbi, Joaquim Chissano, and Graça Machel. Two state-run universities were founded in Portuguese Africa in the 1962 by the Minister of the Overseas Adriano Moreira (the Universidade de Luanda in Angola and the Universidade de Lourenço Marques in Mozambique, awarding a range of degrees from engineering to medicine); however, most of their students came from Portuguese families living in the two territories. Several personalities in Portuguese society, including one of the most idolized sports stars in Portuguese football history, a black football player from Portuguese East Africa named Eusébio, were other examples of efforts towards assimilation and multiracialism in the post-World War II period.

=== Composition of the Portuguese Army ===
According to Mozambican historian João Paulo Borges Coelho, the Portuguese colonial army was largely segregated along terms of race and ethnicity until 1960. There were originally three classes of soldier in Portuguese overseas service: commissioned soldiers (whites), overseas soldiers (African assimilados), and native or indigenous Africans (indigenato'). These categories were renamed to first, second, and third class in 1960, which effectively corresponded to the same categories. Later, after official discrimination based on skin colour was outlawed, some Portuguese commanders such as General António de Spínola began a process of "Africanization" of Portuguese forces fighting in Africa. In Portuguese Guinea, this included a large increase in African recruitment along with the establishment of all-black military formations such as the Black Militias (Milícias negras) commanded by Major Carlos Fabião and the African Commando Battalion (Batalhão de Comandos Africanos) commanded by General Almeida Bruno.

While sub-Saharan African soldiers constituted a mere 18% of the total number of troops fighting in Portugal's African territories in 1961, this percentage rose dramatically over the next 13 years, with black soldiers constituting over 50% of all government forces fighting in Africa by April 1974. Coelho noted that perceptions of African soldiers varied a good deal among senior Portuguese commanders during the conflict in Angola, Guinea, and Mozambique. General Francisco da Costa Gomes, perhaps the most successful counterinsurgency commander, sought good relations with local civilians, and employed African units within the framework of an organized counterinsurgency plan, although he was also responsible for the use of chemical warfare in forested areas of Angola. Spínola, by contrast, appealed for a more political and psycho-social use of African soldiers. On the other hand, General Kaúlza de Arriaga, the most conservative of the three, appears to have doubted the reliability of African forces outside his strict control, while continuing to view African soldiers as inferior to Portuguese troops.

As the war progressed, Portugal rapidly increased its mobilized forces. Under the Salazar regime, a military draft required all males to serve three years of obligatory military service; many of those called up to active military duty were deployed to combat zones in Portugal's African overseas provinces. The national service period was increased to four years in 1967, and virtually all conscripts faced a mandatory two-year tour of service in Africa. The existence of the draft and likelihood of combat in African counterinsurgency operations over time resulted in a sharp increase in emigration by Portuguese men seeking to avoid such service. By the end of the Portuguese colonial war in 1974, black African participation had become crucial due to declining numbers of recruits available from Portugal itself.

Native African troops, although widely deployed, were initially used in subordinate roles as enlisted troops or noncommissioned officers. Portuguese colonial administrators were handicapped by their policies in education, which largely barred indigenous Africans from adequate education until well after the outbreak of the insurgency. With illiteracy rates approaching 99% and almost no African enrollment in secondary schools, few African candidates could qualify for Portugal's officer candidate programs; most African officers obtained their commission as the result of individual competence and valour on the battlefield. As the war went on, an increasing number of native Africans served as noncommissioned or commissioned officers by the 1970s, including such officers as Captain (later Lt. Colonel) Marcelino da Mata, a Portuguese citizen born of native Guinean parents who rose to command from a first sergeant in a road engineering unit to a commander in the elite all-African Comandos Africanos, where he eventually became one of the most decorated soldiers in the Portuguese Army. Many native Angolans rose to positions of command, though of junior rank.

By the early 1970s, the Portuguese authorities had fully perceived racial discriminatory policies and lack of investment in education as wrong and contrary to their overseas ambitions in Portuguese Africa, and willingly accepted a true color blindness policy with more spending in education and training opportunities, which started to produce a larger number of black high ranked professionals, including military personnel.

=== Intervention by Cold War powers ===
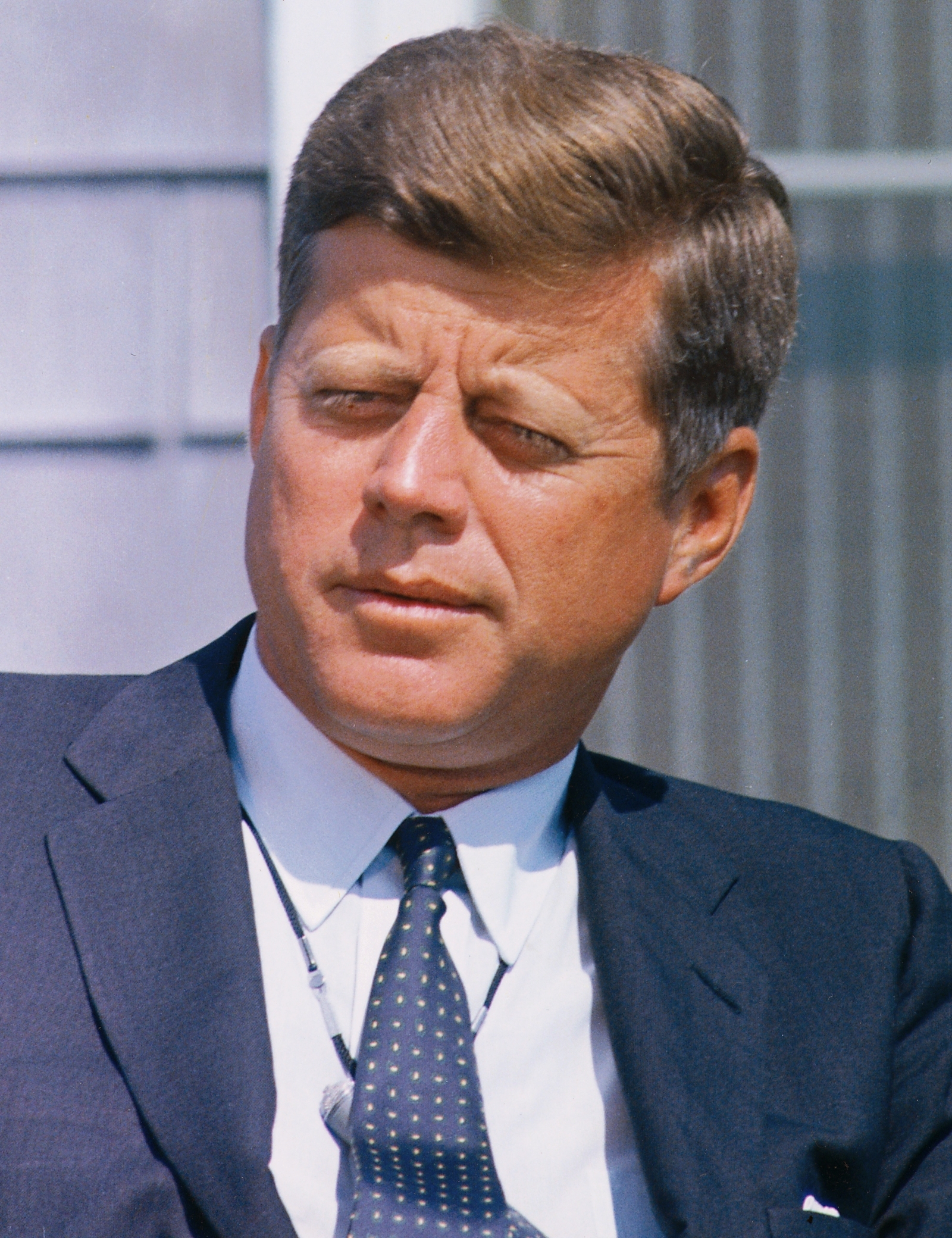
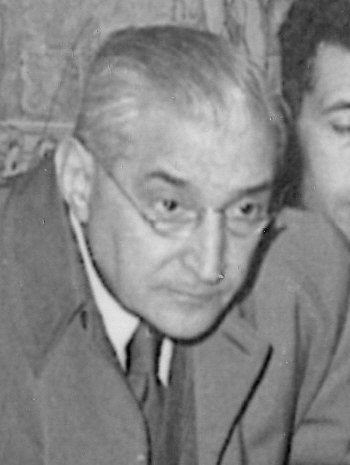
US President John F. Kennedy (left) and prime-minister of Portugal António de Oliveira Salazar (right).

After the World War II, as communist and anticolonial ideologies spread across Africa, many clandestine political movements were established in support of independence using various interpretations of Marxist revolutionary ideology. These new movements seized on anti-Portuguese and anti-colonial sentiment to advocate the complete overthrow of existing governmental structures in Portuguese Africa. These movements alleged that Portuguese policies and development plans were primarily designed by the ruling authorities for the benefit of the territories' ethnic Portuguese population at the expense of local tribal control, the development of native communities, and the majority of the indigenous population, who suffered both state-sponsored discrimination and enormous social pressure to comply with government policies largely imposed from Lisbon. Many felt they had received too little opportunity or resources to upgrade their skills and improve their economic and social situation to a degree comparable to that of the Europeans. Statistically, Portuguese Africa's white Portuguese population were indeed wealthier and more educated than the indigenous majority.

After conflict erupted between the UPA and MPLA and Portuguese military forces, U.S. President John F. Kennedy advised António de Oliveira Salazar (via the US consulate in Portugal) that Portugal should abandon its African colonies, and that course of action by Kennedy would lead to a political crisis between Portugal and the United States. A failed Portuguese military coup known as the Abrilada, attempted in an effort to overthrow the authoritarian Estado Novo regime of Salazar, received covert U.S. support. In response, Salazar moved to consolidate his power, ordering an immediate military response to the violence occurring in Angola. The U.S.'s official stance on Portugal would shift following Richard Nixon's election as president. Under the advice of Henry Kissinger, Nixon sought to reduce America's involvement in the Third World, delegating this role to "regional policemen" such as Joseph Mobutu of Congo-Léopoldville. This led to Nixon cutting off aid to Holden Roberto's FNLA and resuming normal trade relations with Portugal. The period of intensified collaboration between the Portuguese and American governments from 1969 onwards has been linked to a "Vietnamisation" of the war, including the use of chemical warfare in forested areas, as the US used similar tactics in the Vietnam War.

While Portuguese forces had all but won the guerrilla war in Angola, and had stalemated FRELIMO in Mozambique, colonial forces were forced on the defensive in Guinea, where PAIGC forces had carved out a large area of the rural countryside under effective insurgent control, using Soviet-supplied AA cannon and ground-to-air missiles to protect their encampments from attack by Portuguese air assets. Overall, the increasing success of Portuguese counterinsurgency operations and the inability or unwillingness of guerrilla forces to destroy the economy of Portugal's African territories was seen as a victory for the Portuguese government policies.

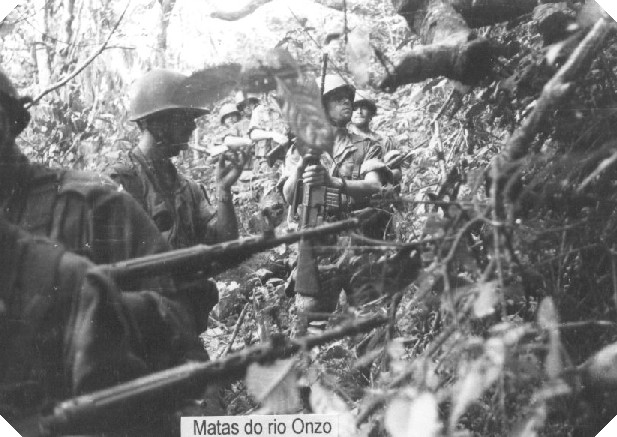
Portuguese combatants in the woods around River Onzo, Angola

The Soviet Union, realising that military success by insurgents in Angola and Mozambique was becoming increasingly remote, shifted much of its military support to the PAIGC in Guinea, while increasing diplomatic efforts to isolate Portugal from the world community. The success of the socialist bloc in isolating Portugal diplomatically extended inside Portugal itself into the armed forces, where younger officers disenchanted with the Estado Novo regime and promotional opportunities began to identify ideologically with those calling for overthrow of the government and the establishment of a state based on Marxist principles.

Nicolae Ceaușescu's Romania offered consistent support to the African liberation movements. Romania was the first state that recognized the independence of Guinea-Bissau, as well as the first to sign agreements with the African Party for the Independence of Guinea and Cape Verde and Angola's MPLA. In May 1974, Ceaușescu reaffirmed Romania's support for Angolan independence. As late as September 1975, Bucharest publicly supported all three Angolan liberation movements (FNLA, MPLA and UNITA). In the spring of 1972, Romania allowed FRELIMO to open a diplomatic mission in Bucharest, the first of its kind in Eastern Europe. In 1973, Ceaușescu recognized FRELIMO as "the only legitimate representative of the Mozambican people", an important precedent. Samora Machel stressed that—during his trip to the Soviet Union—he and his delegation were granted "the status that we are entitled to" due to Romania's official recognition of FRELIMO. In terms of material support, Romanian trucks were used to transport weapons and ammunition to the front, as well as medicine, school material and agricultural equipment. Romanian tractors contributed to the increase in agricultural production. Romanian weapons and uniforms—reportedly of "excellent quality"—played a "decisive role" in FRELIMO's military progress. It was in early 1973 that FRELIMO made these statements about Romania's material support, in a memorandum sent to the Romanian Communist Party's Central Committee. In 1974, Romania became the first country to formally recognize Mozambique.

By early 1974, guerrilla operations in Angola and Mozambique had been reduced to sporadic ambush operations against the Portuguese in the rural countryside areas, far from the main centers of population. The only exception was Portuguese Guinea, where PAIGC guerrilla operations, strongly supported by neighbouring allies like Guinea and Senegal, were largely successful in liberating and securing large areas of Portuguese Guinea. According to some historians, Portugal recognized its inability to win the conflict in Guinea at the outset, but was forced to fight on to prevent an independent Guinea from serving as an inspirational model for insurgents in Angola and Mozambique.

Despite continuing attacks by insurgent forces against targets throughout the Portuguese African territories, the economies of both Portuguese Angola and Mozambique had actually improved each year of the conflict, as had the economy of Portugal proper. Angola enjoyed an unprecedented economic boom during the 1960s, and the Portuguese government built new transportation networks to link the well-developed and highly urbanized coastal strip with the remote inland regions of the territory.

The number of ethnic European Portuguese migrants from mainland Portugal (the metrópole) continued to increase as well, though always constituting a small minority of each territory's total population. Nevertheless, the costs of waging the wars in Africa imposed a heavy burden on Portugal's finances and resources; in 1961 and 1962, at the start of the conflict, Portugal had budget overruns of 80% and 73%, respectively. By the 1970s, the country was spending 40 percent of its annual budget on the war effort.

General Spínola was dismissed by Dr. Marcelo Caetano, the last prime minister of Portugal under the Estado Novo regime, over the general's publicly announced desire to open negotiations with the PAIGC in Portuguese Guinea. The dismissal caused considerable public indignation in Portugal, and created favorable conditions for a military overthrow of the existing regime, which had lost all public support. On 25 April 1974 a military coup organized by left-wing Portuguese military officers, the Armed Forces Movement (MFA), overthrew the Estado Novo regime in what came to be known as the Carnation Revolution in Lisbon, Portugal.

The coup resulted in a period of economic collapse and political instability, but received general support from the public in its aim of ending the Portuguese war effort in Africa. In the ex-colonies, officers suspected of sympathizing with the prior regime, even black officers, such as Captain Marcelino da Mata, were imprisoned and tortured, while African soldiers who had served in native Portuguese Army units were forced to petition for Portuguese citizenship or else face reprisals from their former enemies in Angola, Guinea, or Mozambique.

The Carnation Revolution of 25 April 1974 came as a shock to the United States and other Western powers, as most analysts and the Nixon administration had concluded that Portuguese military success on the battlefield would resolve any political divisions within Portugal concerning the conduct of the war in Portuguese Africa, providing the conditions for US investment there. Most concerned was the apartheid government of South Africa, which launched a deep border incursion operation into Angola to attack guerrilla-controlled areas of the country following the coup.

== Theatres of war ==
=== Angola ===
Map showing the location of Angola in modern-day Africa

On 3 January 1961 Angolan peasants in the region of Baixa de Cassanje, Malanje boycotted the Cotonang Company's cotton fields where they worked, demanding better working conditions and higher wages. Cotonang, a company owned by European investors, used native African labor to produce an annual cotton crop for export abroad. The uprising, later to become known as the Baixa de Cassanje revolt, was led by two previously unknown Angolans, António Mariano and Kulu-Xingu. During the protests, African workers burned their identification cards and attacked Portuguese traders. The Portuguese Air Force responded to the rebellion by bombing twenty villages in the area, allegedly using napalm in an attack that resulted in some 400 indigenous Angolan deaths.

In the Portuguese Overseas Province of Angola, the call for revolution was taken up by two insurgent groups, the People's Movement for the Liberation of Angola (MPLA), and the União das Populações de Angola (UPA), which became the National Liberation Front of Angola (FNLA) in 1962. The MPLA commenced activities in an area of Angola known as the Zona Sublevada do Norte (ZSN or the Rebel Zone of the North), consisting of the provinces of Zaire, Uíge and Cuanza Norte.

==== Insurgent attacks ====
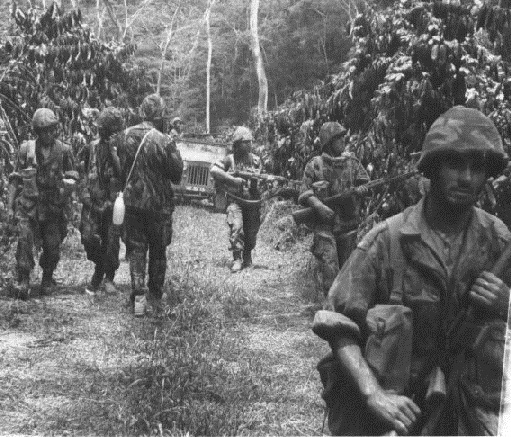
Portuguese Army soldiers in the beginning of the War in Angola. The camouflage uniforms and the FN FAL assault rifles identify them as Caçadores Especiais. At this time, the remaining Army forces still wore yellow khaki field uniforms and were mostly armed with bolt-action rifles.

On 4 February 1961, using arms largely captured from Portuguese soldiers and police 250 MPLA guerrillas attacked the São Paulo fortress prison and police headquarters in Luanda in an attempt to free what it termed 'political prisoners'. The attack was unsuccessful, and no prisoners were released, but seven Portuguese policemen and forty Angolans were killed, mostly MPLA insurgents. Portuguese authorities responded with a sweeping counterinsurgency response in which over 5,000 Angolans were arrested, and a Portuguese mob raided the musseques (shanty towns) of Luanda, killing several dozen Angolans in the process.

On 15 March 1961, the UPA led by Holden Roberto launched an incursion into the Bakongo region of northern Angola with 4,000–5,000 insurgents. The insurgents called for local Bantu farmworkers and villagers to join them, unleashing an orgy of violence and destruction. The insurgents attacked farms, government outposts, and trading centers, killing everyone they encountered, including women, children and newborns.

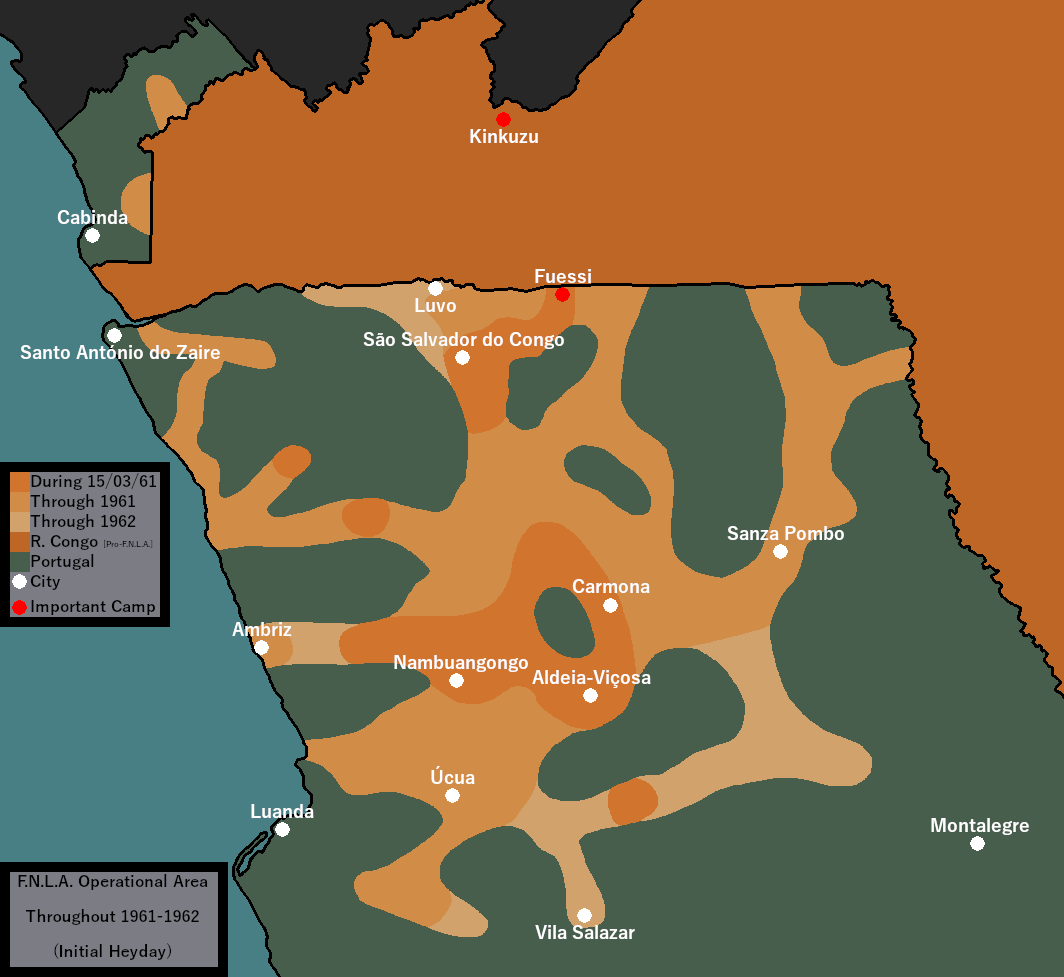
A map of the FNLA operational area in Angola throughout 1961-1962.

In surprise attacks, drunken and buoyed by belief in tribal spells that they believed made them immune to bullets, the attackers spread terror and destruction in the whole area. At least 1,000 Portuguese settlers and an unknown but larger number of indigenous Angolans were killed by the insurgents during the attacks. The violence of the uprising received worldwide press attention and engendered sympathy for the Portuguese, while adversely affecting the international reputation of Roberto and the UPA.

==== Portuguese response ====
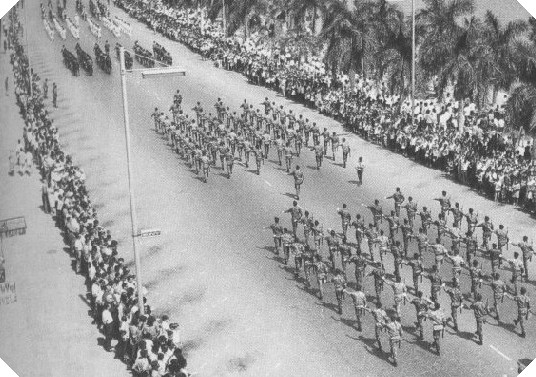
Portuguese military parade in Luanda, Angola.

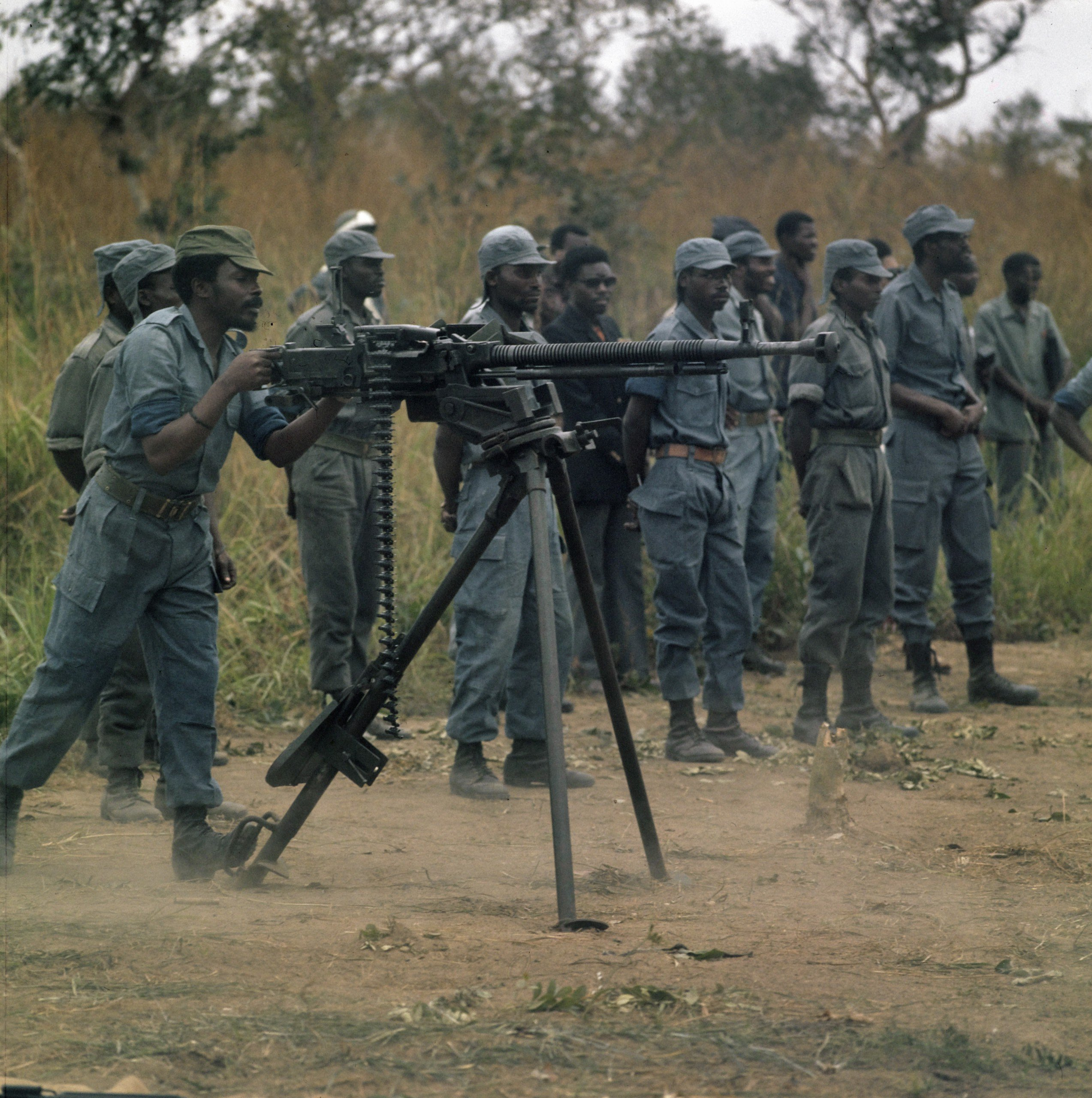
Training of FNLA soldiers in Zaire

In response, Portuguese Armed Forces instituted a harsh policy of reciprocity by torturing and massacring rebels and protesters. Some Portuguese soldiers decapitated rebels and impaled their heads on stakes, pursuing a policy of "an eye for an eye, a tooth for a tooth". Much of the initial offensive operations against Angolan UPA and MPLA insurgents was undertaken by four companies of Caçadores Especiais (Special Hunter) troops skilled in light infantry and antiguerrilla tactics, and who were already stationed in Angola at the outbreak of fighting. Individual Portuguese counterinsurgency commanders such as Second Lieutenant Fernando Robles of the 6ª Companhia de Caçadores Especiais became well known throughout the country for their ruthlessness in hunting down insurgents.

The Portuguese Army steadily pushed the UPA back across the border into Congo-Kinshasa in a brutal counteroffensive that also displaced some 150,000 Bakongo refugees, taking control of Pedra Verde, the UPA's last base in northern Angola, on 20 September 1961. Within the next few weeks Portuguese military forces pushed the MPLA out of Luanda northeast into the Dembos region, where the MPLA established the "1st Military Region". For the moment, the Angolan insurgency had been defeated, but new guerrilla attacks later broke out in other regions of Angola such as Cabinda province, the central plateaus, and eastern and southeastern Angola.

By most accounts, Portugal's counterinsurgency campaign in Angola was the most successful of all its campaigns in the Colonial War. Angola is a large territory, and the long distances from safe havens in neighboring countries supporting the rebel forces made it difficult for the latter to escape detection. Distances from the major Angolan urban centres to neighbouring Zaïre and Zambia were so large that the eastern part of Angola's territory was known by the Portuguese as Terras do Fim do Mundo (the lands of the far side of the world).

Another factor was internecine struggles between three competing revolutionary movements – FNLA, MPLA, and UNITA – and their guerrilla armies. For most of the conflict, the three rebel groups spent as much time fighting each other as they did fighting the Portuguese. For example, during the 1961 Ferreira Incident, a UPA patrol captured 21 MPLA insurgents as prisoners, then summarily executed them on 9 October, sparking open confrontation between the two insurgent groups. These divisions grew so deep, that by 1972, UNITA agreed to a temporary ceasefire with the Portuguese and began coordinating with them against the MPLA by providing intelligence on MPLA positions, numbers, and troop movements. However by 1973 clahses once again broke out between Portuguese and UNITA forces.

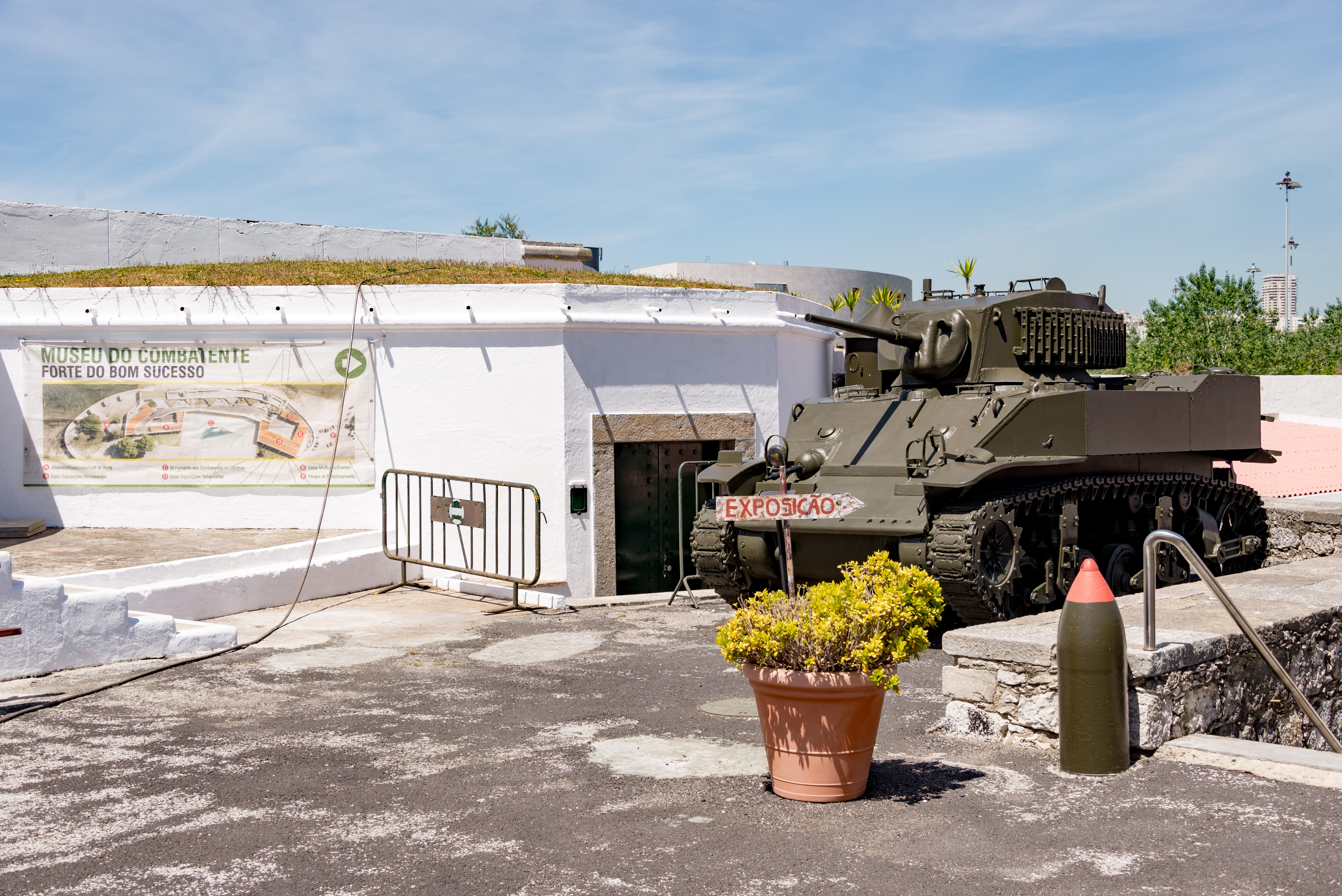
Portuguese M5 Stuart tank now kept at the Museu do Combatante in the Bom Sucesso Fort. The M5 Stuart saw limited but successful action in Angola.

Strategy also played a role, as a successful hearts and minds campaign led by General Francisco da Costa Gomes helped blunt the influence of the various revolutionary movements. Finally, as in Mozambique, Portuguese Angola was able to receive support of South Africa. South African military operations proved to be of significant assistance to Portuguese military forces in Angola, who sometimes referred to their South African counterparts as primos (cousins).

Several unique counter-insurgency forces were developed and deployed in the campaign in Angola:

- Batalhões de Caçadores Pára-quedistas (Paratrooper Hunter Battalions): employed throughout the conflicts in Africa, were the first forces to arrive in Angola when the war began.
- Comandos (Commandos): born out of the war in Angola, they were created as an elite counter-guerrilla special forces, and later used in Guinea and Mozambique.
- Caçadores Especiais (Special Hunters): were in Angola from the start of the conflict in 1961.
- Fiéis (Faithfuls): a force composed by Katanga exiles, black soldiers that opposed the rule of Mobutu Sese Seko in Congo-Kinshasa
- Leais (Loyals): a force composed by exiles from Zambia, black soldiers that were against Kenneth Kaunda
- Grupos Especiais (Special Groups): units of volunteer black soldiers that had commando training; also used in Mozambique
- Tropas Especiais (Special Troops): the name of Special Groups in Cabinda
- Flechas (Arrows): a successful indigenous formation of scouts, controlled by the Portuguese secret police PIDE/DGS, and composed by Bushmen that specialized in tracking, reconnaissance and pseudo-terrorist operations. Also employed in Mozambique, the Flechas inspired the formation of the Rhodesian Selous Scouts.
- Grupo de Cavalaria Nº1 (1st Cavalry Group): a mounted cavalry unit, armed with the 7.62 mm Espingarda m/961 rifle and the m/961 Walther P38 pistol, tasked with reconnaissance and patrolling. The 1st was also known as the "Angolan Dragoons" (Dragões de Angola). The Rhodesians also later developed a similar concept of horse-mounted counter-insurgency forces, forming the Grey's Scouts.
- Batalhão de Cavalaria 1927 (1927 Cavalry Battalion): a tank unit equipped with the M5A1 tank. The battalion was used for supporting infantry forces and as a rapid reaction force. Again the Rhodesians developed a similar unit, forming the Rhodesian Armoured Car Regiment.

=== Portuguese Guinea ===
Guinea-Bissau, formerly Portuguese Guinea, on a map of Africa

General António de Spínola, governor of Portuguese Guinea between 1968 and 1973. Conducted an effective campaign both against the PAIGC as well as to develop Guinea.

In Portuguese Guinea (also referred to as Guinea at that time), the Marxist African Party for the Independence of Guinea and Cape Verde (PAIGC) started fighting in January 1963. Its guerrilla fighters attacked the Portuguese headquarters in Tite, located to the south of Bissau, the capital, near the Corubal river. Similar actions quickly spread across the entire colony, requiring a strong response from the Portuguese forces.

The war in Guinea has been termed "Portugal's Vietnam". The PAIGC was well-trained, well-led and equipped and received substantial support from safe havens in neighbouring countries like Senegal and the Republic of Guinea (Guinea-Conakry). The jungles of Guinea and the proximity of the PAIGC's allies near the border proved to be of significant advantage in providing tactical superiority during cross-border attacks and resupply missions for the guerrillas. The conflict in Portuguese Guinea involving the PAIGC guerrillas and the Portuguese Army proved the most intense and damaging of all conflicts in the Portuguese Colonial War, blocking Portuguese attempts to pacify the disputed territory via new economic and socioeconomic policies that had been applied with some success in Portuguese Angola and Portuguese Mozambique. In 1965 the war spread to the eastern part of Guinea; that year, the PAIGC carried out attacks in the north of the territory where at the time only the Front for the Liberation and Independence of Guinea (FLING), a minor insurgent group, was active. By this time, the PAIGC had begun to openly receive military support from Cuba, China, and the Soviet Union.

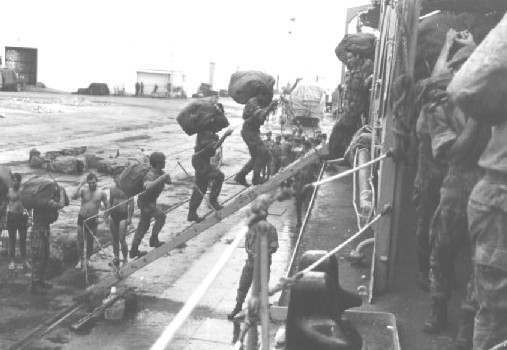
Portuguese troops board NRP Nuno Tristão frigate in Portuguese Guinea, during amphibious Operation Trident (Operação Tridente), 1964

In Guinea, the success of PAIGC guerrilla operations put Portuguese armed forces on the defensive, forcing them to limit their response to defending territories and cities already held. Unlike Portugal's other African territories, successful small-unit Portuguese counterinsurgency tactics were slow to evolve in Guinea. Defensive operations, where soldiers were dispersed in small numbers to guard critical buildings, farms, or infrastructure, were particularly devastating to the regular Portuguese infantry, who became vulnerable to guerrilla attacks outside of populated areas by the forces of the PAIGC. They were also demoralized by the steady growth of PAIGC liberation sympathizers and recruits among the rural population. In a relatively short time, the PAIGC had succeeded in reducing Portuguese military and administrative control of the territory to a relatively small area of Guinea. The scale of this success can be seen in the fact that native Guineans in the 'liberated territories' ceased payment of debts to Portuguese landowners and the payment of taxes to the colonial administration. The branch stores of the Companhia União Fabril (CUF), Mario Lima Whanon, and Manuel Pinto Brandão companies were seized and inventoried by the PAIGC in the areas they controlled, while the use of Portuguese currency in the areas under guerrilla control was banned. In order to maintain the economy in the liberated territories, the PAIGC established its own administrative and governmental bureaucracy at an early stage, which organized agricultural production, educated PAIGC farmworkers on how to protect crops from destruction from aerial attack by the Portuguese Air Force, and opened armazens do povo (people's stores) to supply urgently needed tools and supplies in exchange for agricultural produce.

In 1968, General António de Spínola, the Portuguese general responsible for the Portuguese military operations in Guinea, was appointed as governor. General Spínola began a series of civil and military reforms designed to weaken PAIGC control of the Guinea and rollback insurgent gains. This included a 'hearts and minds' propaganda campaign designed to win the trust of the indigenous population, an effort to eliminate some of the discriminatory practices against native Guineans, a massive construction campaign for public works including new schools, hospital, an improved telecommunications and road network, and a large increase in recruitment of native Guineans into the Portuguese armed forces serving in Guinea as part of an Africanization strategy.

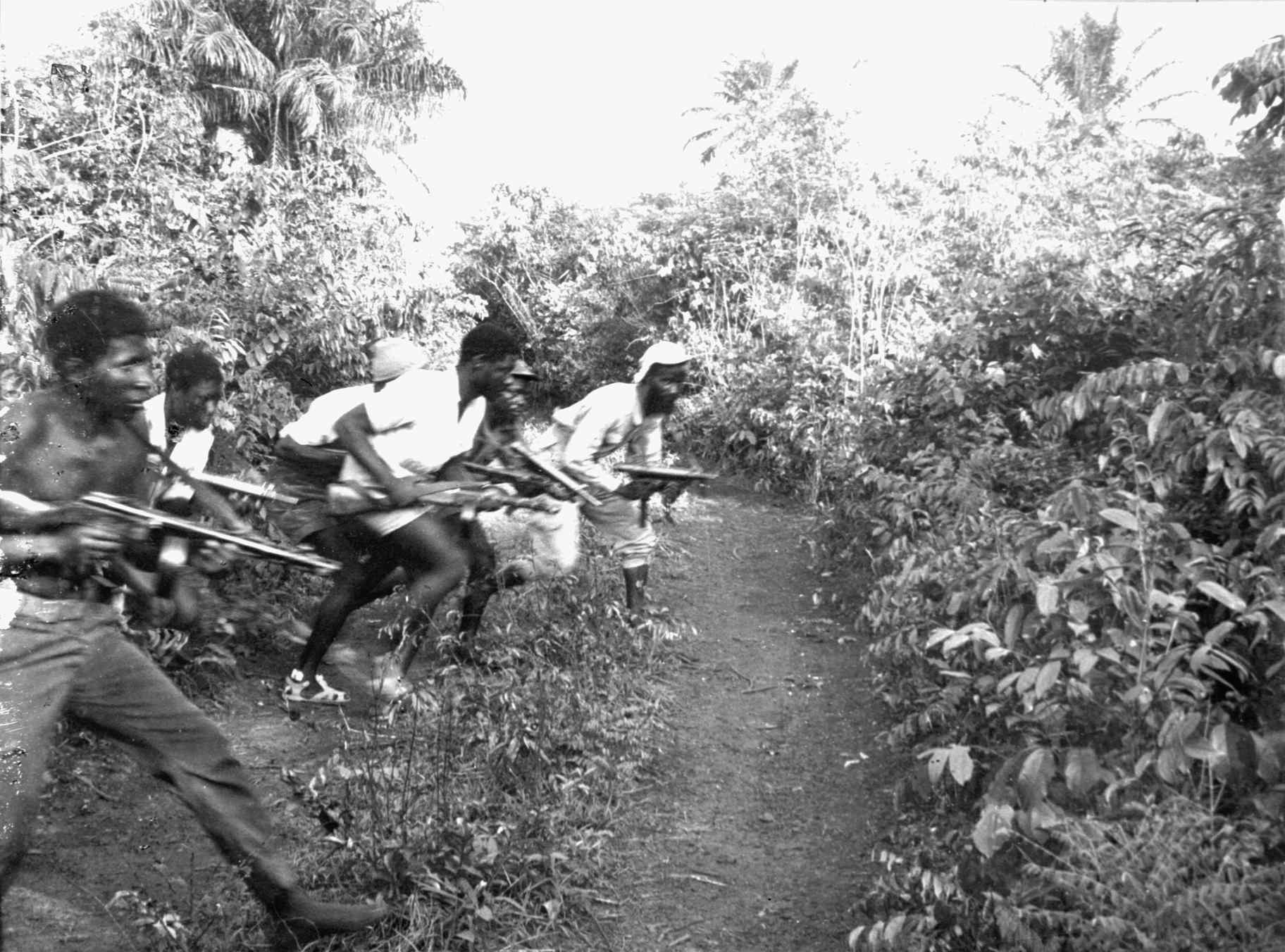
PAIGC guerrillas on Como island.

Until 1960, Portuguese military forces serving in Guinea were composed of units led by white officers, with commissioned soldiers (whites), overseas soldiers (African assimilados), and native or indigenous Africans (indigenato) serving in the enlisted ranks. General Spínola's Africanization policy eliminated these discriminatory colour bars, and called for the integration of indigenous Guinea Africans into Portuguese military forces in Africa. Two special indigenous African counterinsurgency detachments were formed by the Portuguese Armed Forces. The first of these was the African Commandos (Comandos Africanos), consisting of a battalion of commandos composed entirely of black soldiers (including the officers). The second was the African Special Marines (Fuzileiros Especiais Africanos), Marine units entirely composed of black soldiers. The African Special Marines supplemented other Portuguese elite units conducting amphibious operations in the riverine areas of Guinea in an attempt to interdict and destroy guerrilla forces and supplies. General Spínola's Africanization policy also fostered a large increase in indigenous recruitment into the armed forces, culminating the establishment of all-black military formations such as the Black Militias (Milícias negras) commanded by Major Carlos Fabião. By the early 1970s, an increasing percentage of Guineans were serving as noncommissioned or commissioned officers in Portuguese military forces in Africa, including such higher-ranking officers as Captain (later Lt. Colonel) Marcelino da Mata, a black Portuguese citizen born of Guinean parents who rose from a first sergeant in a road engineering unit to a commander in the Comandos Africanos.

During the latter part of the 1960s, military tactical reforms instituted by Gen. Spínola began to improve Portuguese counterinsurgency operations in Guinea. Naval amphibious operations were instituted to overcome some of the mobility problems inherent in the underdeveloped and marshy areas of the territory, using Destacamentos de Fuzileiros Especiais (DFE) (special marine assault detachments) as strike forces. The Fuzileiros Especiais were lightly equipped with folding-stock m/961 (G3) rifles, 37mm rocket launchers, and light machine guns such as the Heckler & Koch HK21 to enhance their mobility in the difficult, swampy terrain.

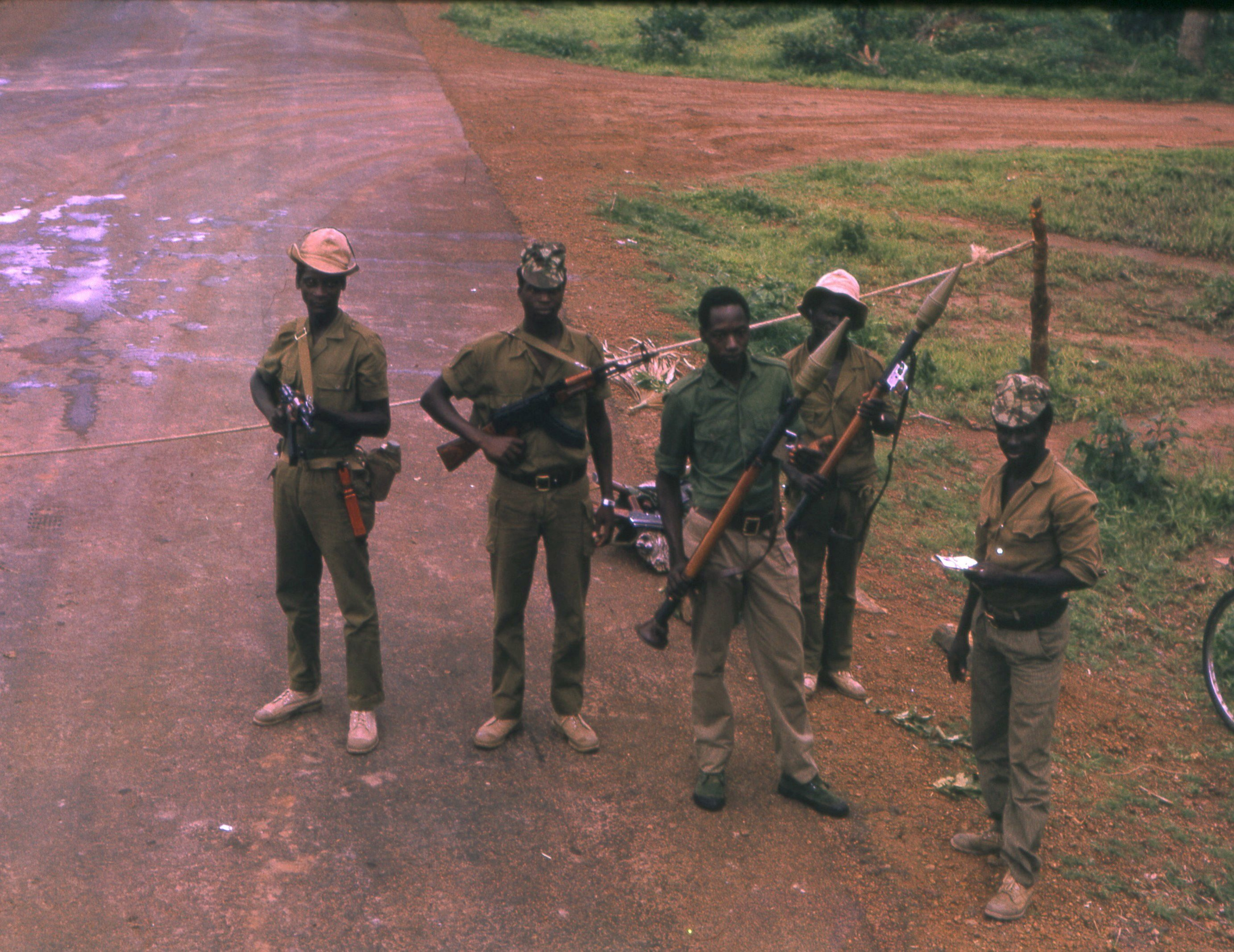
A PAIGC checkpoint in 1974

Portugal commenced Operação Mar Verde or Operation Green Sea on 22 November 1970 in an attempt to overthrow Ahmed Sékou Touré, the leader of the Guinea-Conakry and staunch PAIGC ally, to capture the leader of the PAIGC, Amílcar Cabral, and to cut off supply lines to PAIGC insurgents. The operation involved a daring raid on Conakry, a PAIGC safe haven, in which 400 Portuguese Fuzileiros (amphibious assault troops) attacked the city. The attempted coup d'état failed, though the Portuguese managed to destroy several PAIGC ships and free hundreds of Portuguese prisoners of war (POWs) at several large POW camps. One immediate result of Operation Green Sea was an escalation in the conflict, with countries such as Algeria and Nigeria now offering support to the PAIGC as well as the Soviet Union, which sent warships to the region (known by NATO as the West Africa Patrol) in a show of force calculated to deter future Portuguese amphibious attacks on the territory of the Guinea-Conakry. The United Nations passed several resolutions condemning cross-border attacks of the Portuguese military against the PAIGC guerrilla bases in both neighbouring Guinea-Conakry and Senegal, like the United Nations Security Council Resolution 290, United Nations Security Council Resolution 294 and the United Nations Security Council Resolution 295.

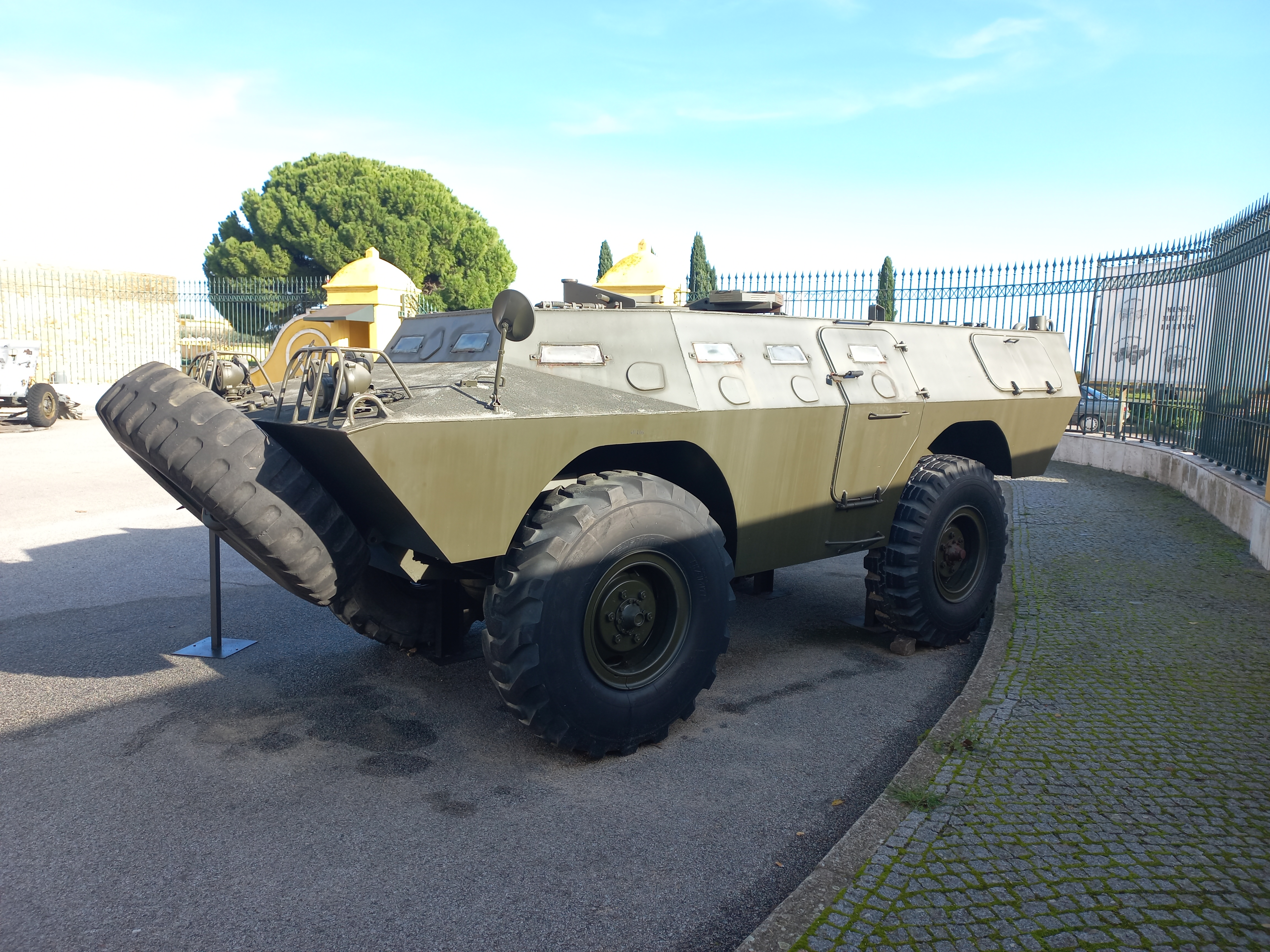
Portuguese manufactured BRAVIA Chaimite, introduced in Guinea in the late stages of the war.

Between 1968 and 1972, the Portuguese forces increased their offensive posture, in the form of raids into PAIGC-controlled territory. At this time Portuguese forces also adopted unorthodox means of countering the insurgents, including attacks on the political structure of the nationalist movement. This strategy culminated in the assassination of Amílcar Cabral in January 1973. Nonetheless, the PAIGC continued to increase its strength, and began to heavily press Portuguese defense forces. This became even more apparent after the PAIGC received heavy radar-guided anti-aircraft cannon and other AA munitions provided by the Soviets, including SA-7 shoulder-launched anti-aircraft missiles, all of which seriously impeded Portuguese air operations.

After the Carnation Revolution military coup in Lisbon on 25 April 1974, the new revolutionary leaders of Portugal and the PAIGC signed an accord in Algiers, Algeria, in which Portugal agreed to remove all troops by the end of October and to officially recognize the Republic of Guinea-Bissau government controlled by the PAIGC, on 26 August 1974 and after a series of diplomatic meetings. Demobilized by the departing Portuguese military authorities after the independence of Portuguese Guinea had been agreed, a total of 7,447 black Guinea-Bissauan African soldiers who had served in Portuguese native commando forces and militia were summarily executed by the PAIGC after the independence of the new African country.

=== Mozambique ===
Mozambique within modern-day Africa.

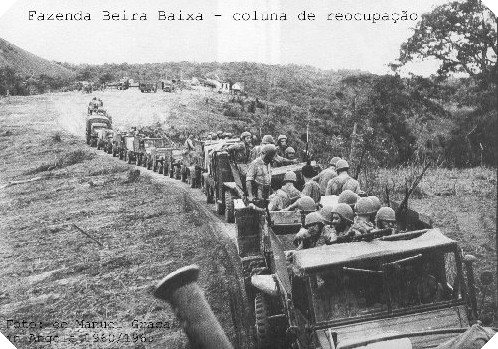
Reoccupation of Beira Baixa estate, 1961

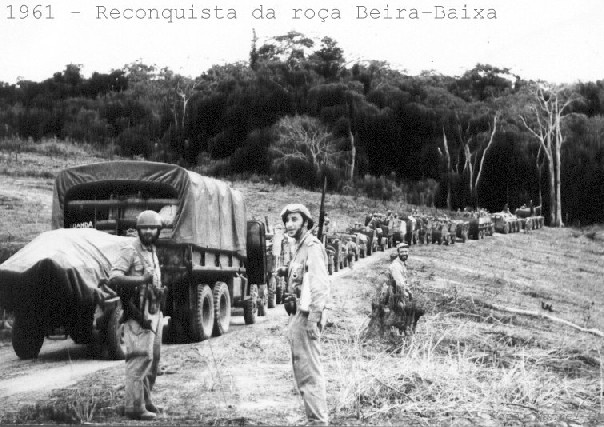
Reoccupation of Beira Baixa estate

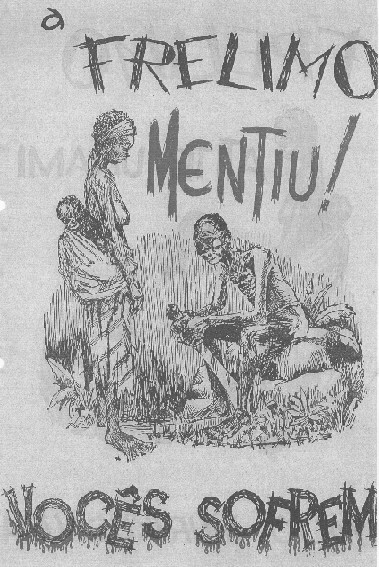
Portuguese air-launched propaganda leaflet. It reads: "Frelimo lied! You suffer!"

The Portuguese Overseas Province of Mozambique was the last territory to start the war of liberation. Its nationalist movement was led by the Marxist-Leninist Liberation Front of Mozambique (FRELIMO), which carried out the first attack against Portuguese targets on 25 September 1964, in Chai, Cabo Delgado Province. The fighting later spread to Niassa, Tete in central Mozambique. A report from Battalion No. 558 of the Portuguese army makes references to violent actions, also in Cabo Delgado, on 21 August 1964.

On 16 November of the same year, the Portuguese troops suffered their first losses fighting in the north of the territory, in the region of Xilama. By this time, the size of the guerrilla movement had substantially increased; this, along with the low numbers of Portuguese troops and colonists, allowed a steady increase in FRELIMO's strength. It quickly started moving south in the direction of Meponda and Mandimba, linking to Tete with the aid of Malawi.

Until 1967, the FRELIMO showed less interest in Tete region, putting its efforts on the two northernmost districts of Mozambique where the use of landmines became very common. In the region of Niassa, FRELIMO's intention was to create a free corridor to Zambezia Province. Until April 1970, the military activity of FRELIMO increased steadily, mainly due to the strategic work of Samora Machel in the region of Cabo Delgado.

Rhodesia was involved in the war in Mozambique, supporting the Portuguese troops in operations and conducting operations independently. By 1973, the territory was mostly under Portuguese control. The Operation "Nó Górdio" (Gordian Knot Operation)—conducted in 1970 and commanded by Portuguese Brigadier General Kaúlza de Arriaga—a conventional-style operation to destroy the guerrilla bases in the north of Mozambique, was the major military operation of the Portuguese Colonial War. A hotly disputed issue, the Gordian Knot Operation was considered by several historians and military strategists as a failure that worsened the situation for the Portuguese. Others did not share this view, including its main architect, troops, and officials who had participated on both sides of the operation, including high ranked elements from the FRELIMO guerrillas. It was also described as a tremendous success of the Portuguese Armed Forces. Arriaga, however, was removed from his powerful military post in Mozambique by Marcelo Caetano shortly before the events in Lisbon that triggered the end of the war and the independence of the Portuguese territories in Africa. The reason for Arriaga's abrupt fate was an alleged incident with indigenous civilian populations, and the Portuguese government's suspicion that Arriaga was planning a military coup against Marcelo's administration in order to avoid the rise of leftist influences in Portugal and the loss of the African overseas provinces.

The construction of the Cahora Bassa Dam tied up nearly 50 percent of the Portuguese troops in Mozambique, and brought the FRELIMO to the Tete Province, closer to some cities and more populated areas in the south. The FRELIMO failed, however, to halt the construction of the dam. In 1974, the FRELIMO launched mortar attacks against Vila Pery (now Chimoio), an important city and the first (and only) heavy populated area to be hit by the FRELIMO.

In Mozambique special units were also used by the Portuguese Armed Forces:

- Grupos Especiais (Special Groups): locally raised counter-insurgency troops similar to those used in Angola
- Grupos Especiais Pára-Quedistas (Paratrooper Special Groups): units of volunteer black soldiers that were given airborne training
- Grupos Especiais de Pisteiros de Combate (Combat Tracking Special Groups): special units trained in tracking and locating guerrillas forces
- Flechas (Arrows), a special forces unit of the Portuguese secret police, formation of indigenous scouts and trackers, similar to the one employed in Angola

=== Major counter-insurgency operations ===
- 1970 Mozambique – Gordian Knot Operation (Operação Nó Górdio)
- 1970 Guinea-Bissau – Operation Green Sea (Operação Mar Verde)
- 1971 Angola – Frente Leste (Portuguese for "Eastern Front")

=== Role of the Organisation of African Unity ===
The Organization of African Unity (OAU) was founded May 1963. Its basic principles were co-operation between African nations and solidarity between African peoples. Another important objective of the OAU was an end to all forms of colonialism in Africa. This became the major objective of the organization in its first years and soon OAU pressure led to the situation in the Portuguese colonies being brought up at the UN Security Council.

The OAU established a committee based in Dar es Salaam, with representatives from Ethiopia, Algeria, Uganda, Egypt, Tanzania, Zaire, Guinea, Senegal, Nigeria, to support African liberation movements. The support provided by the committee included military training and weapon supplies.

The OAU also took action in order to promote the international acknowledgment of the legitimacy of the Revolutionary Government of Angola in Exile (GRAE), composed by the FNLA. This support was transferred to the MPLA and to its leader, Agostinho Neto in 1967. In November 1972, both movements were recognized by the OAU in order to promote their merger. After 1964, the OAU recognized PAIGC as the legitimate representatives of Guinea-Bissau and Cape Verde and in 1965 recognised FRELIMO for Mozambique.

== Armament and tactics ==
=== Portugal ===
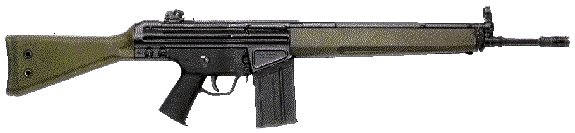
A Portuguese version of Heckler & Koch G3A3 was used as the standard infantry weapon for most of Portugal's forces. It was produced in large quantities in the Fábrica do Braço de Prata small arms plant.

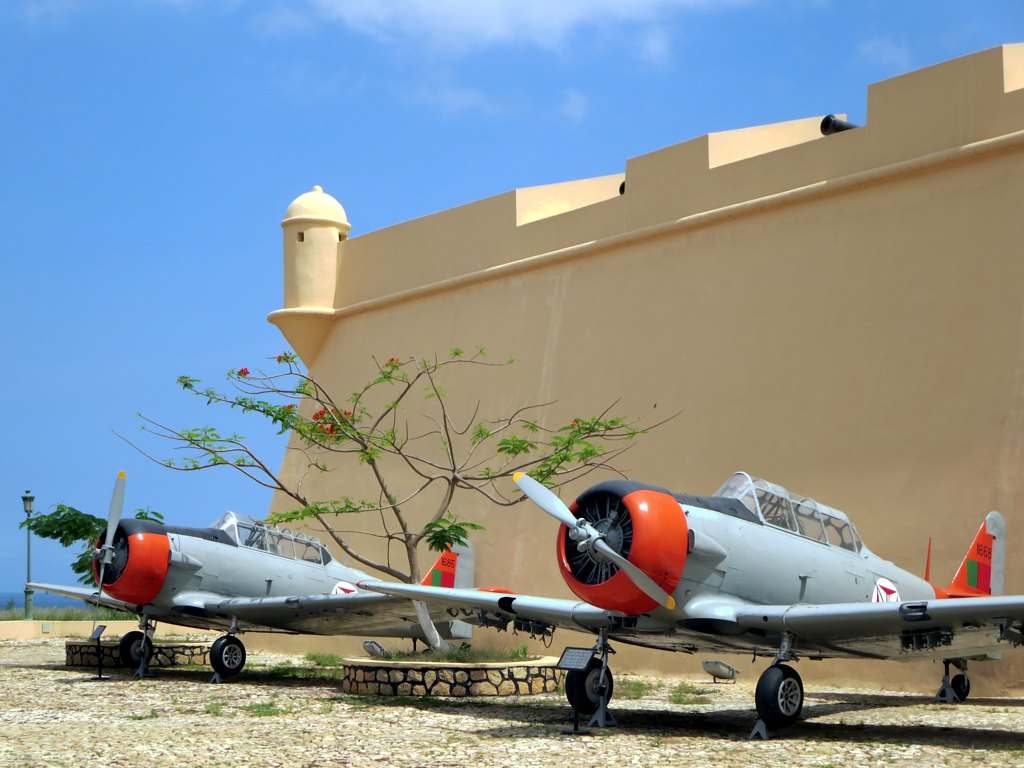
Portuguese-era fighters now on display on the National Museum of Military History in Luanda

In 1961, the Portuguese had 79,000 in arms: 58,000 in the Army, 8,500 in the Navy and 12,500 in the Air Force (Cann, 1997). These grew quickly, and by the end of the conflict in 1974, due to the Carnation Revolution (a military coup in Lisbon), the total in the Portuguese Armed Forces had risen to 217,000.

Prior to their own Colonial War the Portuguese military had studied conflicts such as the First Indochina War, the Algerian War and the Malayan Emergency. Based on their analysis of operations in those theatres and considering their own situation in Africa, the Portuguese military took the unusual decision to restructure its entire armed forces, from top to bottom, for counterinsurgency. This transformation did, however, take seven years to complete and only took its final form in 1968. By 1974, the counterinsurgency efforts were successful in the Portuguese territories of Angola and Mozambique, but in Portuguese Guinea the local guerrillas were making progress. As the conflict escalated, the Portuguese authorities developed progressively tougher responses, these included the Gordian Knot Operation and the Operation Green Sea.

When conflict erupted in 1961, Portuguese forces were badly equipped to cope with the demands of a counter-insurgency conflict. It was standard procedure, up to that point, to send the oldest and most obsolete material to the colonies. Thus, initial military operations were conducted using World War II radios, the old m/937 7.92mm Mauser rifle, the Portuguese m/948 9mm FBP submachine gun, and the equally elderly German m/938 7.92mm (MG 13) Dreyse and Italian 8×59mm RB m/938 (Breda M37) machine guns. Much of Portugal's older small arms came from Germany in various deliveries made mostly before World War II, including the Austrian Steyr/Erma MP 34 submachine gun (m/942). Later, Portugal purchased arms and military equipment from France, West Germany, South Africa, and to a lesser extent, from Belgium, Israel and the US.

Some 9×19mm submachine guns, including the m/942, the Portuguese m/948, the Italian Franchi LF-57 and the West-German manufactured version of the Israeli Uzi (known in Portuguese service as the Pistola-Metralhadora m/61) were also used, mainly by officers, NCOs, horse-mounted cavalry, reserve and paramilitary units, and security forces. Within a short time, the Portuguese Army saw the need for a modern selective-fire combat rifle, and in 1961 adopted the 7.62×51mm NATO caliber Espingarda m/961 (Heckler & Koch G3) as the standard infantry weapon for most of its forces, that was produced in large quantities in the Fábrica do Braço de Prata, a Portuguese small arms producer. However, quantities of the 7.62×51mm FN and Belgian G1 FAL battle rifle, known as the m/962, were also issued; the FAL was a favored weapon of members serving in elite commando units such as the Caçadores Especiais. At the beginning of the war, the elite airborne units (Caçadores Pára-quedistas) rarely used the m/961, having adopted the modern 7.62 mm NATO ArmaLite AR-10 (produced by the Netherlands-based arms manufacturer Artillerie Inrichtingen) in 1960. In the days before attached grenade launchers became standard, Portuguese paratroopers frequently resorted to the use of ENERGA anti-tank rifle grenades fired from their AR-10 rifles. Some Portuguese-model AR-10s were fitted with A.I.-modified upper receivers in order to mount 3× or 3.6× telescopic sights. These rifles were used by marksmen accompanying small patrols to eliminate individual enemy at extended ranges in open country. After the Netherlands embargoed further sales of the AR-10, the paratroop battalions were issued a collapsible-stock version of the regular m/961 (G3) rifle, also in 7.62×51mm NATO caliber.

The powerful recoil and heavy weight of the 7.62mm NATO cartridge used in Portuguese rifle-caliber arms such as the m/961 limited the amount of ammunition that could be carried as well as accuracy in automatic fire, generally precluding the use of the latter except in emergencies. Instead, most infantryman used their rifles to fire individual shots. While the heavy m/961 and its relatively lengthy barrel were well-suited to patrol operations in open savannah, it tended to put Portuguese infantry at a disadvantage when clearing the low-ceilinged interiors of native buildings or huts, or when moving through thick bush, where ambush by a concealed insurgent with an automatic weapon was always a possibility. In these situations the submachine gun, hand grenade or rifle-launched grenade often became a more useful weapon than the rifle. Spanish rifle grenades were sourced from Instalaza, but in due course, the Dilagrama m/65 was more commonly used, using a derivative of the M26 grenade made under licence by INDEP, the M312.

For the general purpose machine gun role, the German MG42 in 8mm and later 7.62mm NATO caliber was used until 1968, when the 7.62mm m/968 Metralhadora Ligeira became available.

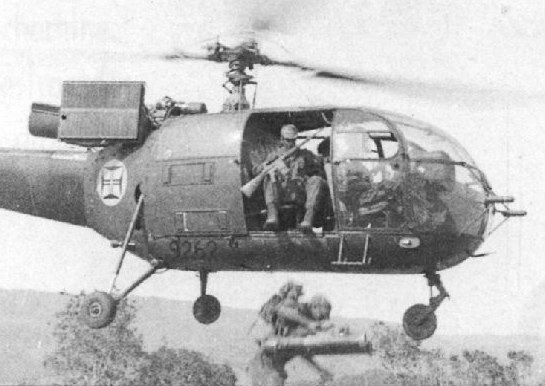
A Portuguese Air Force Alouette III helicopter deploying paratroopers armed with 7.62mm ArmaLite AR-10 rifles during an assault operation in Angola.

To destroy enemy emplacements, other weapons were employed, including the 37 mm (1.46 in), 60 mm (2.5 in), and 89 mm (3.5 in.) Lança-granadas-foguete (Bazooka), along with several types of recoilless rifles. Because of the mobile nature of counterinsurgency operations, heavy support weapons were less frequently used. However, the m/951 12.7mm (.50 caliber) U.S. M2 Browning heavy machine gun was used in ground and vehicle mounts, as were 60mm, 81mm, and later, 120mm mortars. Artillery and mobile howitzers were used in a few operations.

Mobile ground operations consisted of patrol sweeps by armored car and reconnaissance vehicles. Supply convoys used both armored and unarmored vehicles. Typically, armored vehicles were placed at the front, centre, and tail of a motorized convoy. Several armoured cars were used, including the Panhard AML, Panhard EBR, Fox and (in the 1970s) the Chaimite.

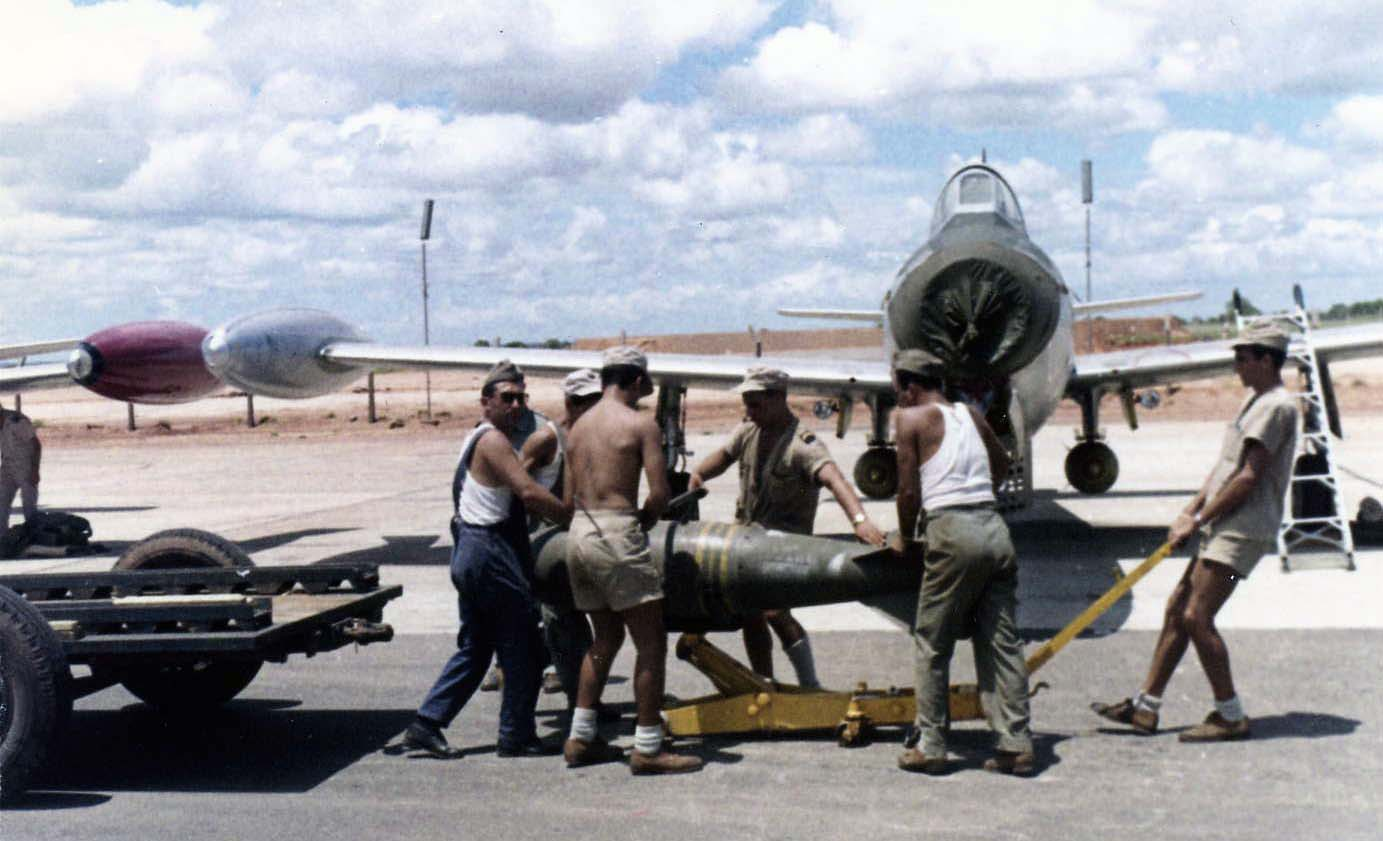
A Portuguese F-84 Thunderjet being loaded with ordnance in the 1960s, at Luanda Air Base.

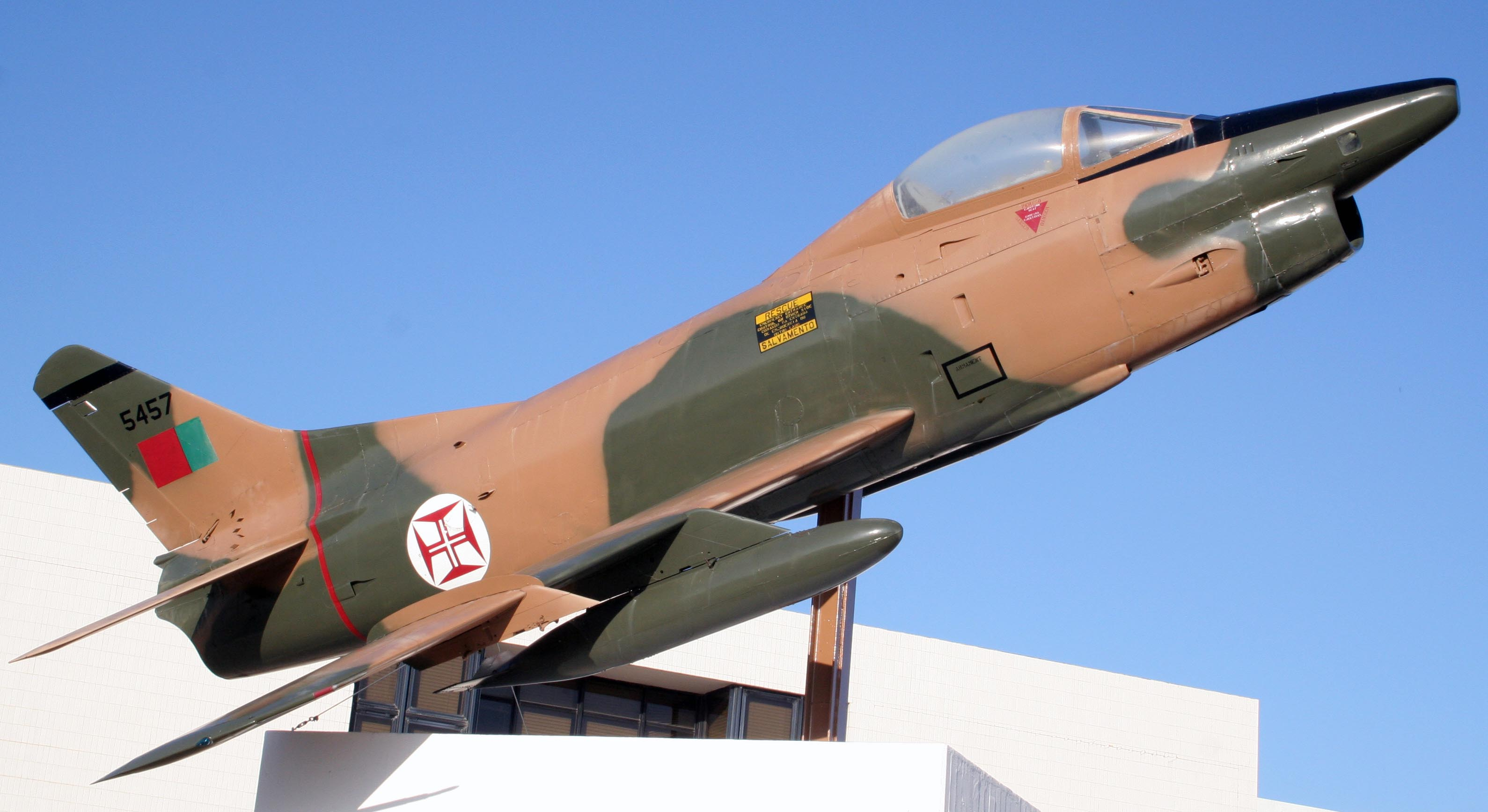
The Portuguese Air Force employed Fiat G.91 aircraft like this in the Portuguese Colonial War.

Unlike the Vietnam War, Portugal's limited national resources did not allow for widespread use of the helicopter. Only those troops involved in coups de main attacks (called golpe de mão in Portuguese)—mainly Commandos and Paratroopers—deployed by helicopter. Most deployments were either on foot or in vehicles (Berliet and Unimog trucks). The helicopters were reserved for support (in a gunship role) or medical evacuation (MEDEVAC). The Alouette III was the most widely used helicopter, although the Puma was also used with great success. Other aircraft were employed: for air support the T-6 Texan, the F-86 Sabre and the Fiat G.91 were used, along with a quantity of B-26 Invaders covertly acquired in 1965; for reconnaissance the Dornier Do 27 was employed. In the transport role, the Portuguese Air Force originally used the Junkers Ju 52, followed by the Nord Noratlas, the C-54 Skymaster, and the C-47 Skytrain (all of these aircraft were also used for Paratroop drop operations). From 1965, Portugal began to purchase the Fiat G.91 to deploy to its African overseas territories of Mozambique, Guinea and Angola in the close-support role. The first 40 G.91 were purchased second-hand from the Luftwaffe, aircraft that had been produced for Greece and which differed from the rest of the Luftwaffe G.91s enough to create maintenance problems. The aircraft replaced the Portuguese F-86 Sabre.

The Portuguese Navy (particularly the Marines, known as Fuzileiros) made extensive use of patrol boats, landing craft, and Zodiac inflatable boats. They were employed especially in Guinea, but also in the Congo River (and other smaller rivers) in Angola and in the Zambezi (and other rivers) in Mozambique. Equipped with standard or collapsible-stock m/961 rifles, grenades, and other gear, they used small boats or patrol craft to infiltrate guerrilla positions. In an effort to intercept infiltrators, the Fuzileiros even manned small patrol craft on Lake Malawi. The Navy also used Portuguese civilian cruisers as troop transports, and drafted Portuguese Merchant Navy personnel to man ships carrying troops and material and into the Marines.

There were also many Portuguese irregular forces in the Overseas War such as the Flechas and others, as mentioned above.

Native black warriors were employed in Africa by the Portuguese colonial rulers since the 16th century. Portugal had employed regular native troops (companhias indigenas) in its colonial army since the early 19th century. After 1961, with the beginning of the colonial wars in its overseas territories, Portugal began to incorporate black Portuguese Africans into integrated units as part of the war effort in Angola, Portuguese Guinea, and Mozambique, based on concepts of multi-racialism and preservation of the empire. African participation on the Portuguese side of the conflict varied from marginal roles as laborers and informers to participation in highly trained operational combat units like the Flechas. As the war progressed, use of African counterinsurgency troops increased; on the eve of the military coup of 25 April 1974, black ethnic Africans accounted for more than 50 percent of Portuguese forces fighting the war.

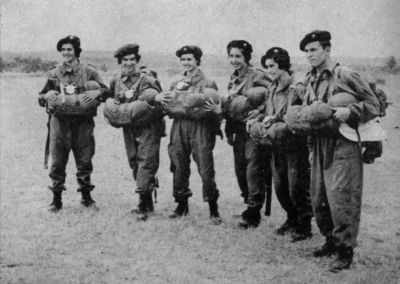
Portuguese paratrooper-nurses undergoing training.

From 1961 to the end of the Colonial War, the paratrooper nurses nicknamed Marias, were women who served the Portuguese armed forces being deployed in Portuguese Africa's dangerous guerrilla-infiltrated combat zones to perform rescue operations.

Throughout the war period Portugal had to deal with increasing dissent, arms embargoes and other punitive sanctions imposed by most of the international community. Although, at least in the early stages of the conflict, Portugal was sold arms by France and West Germany with the knowledge that they were being used to suppress Portugal's colonial uprisings. Apart from these limited exceptions, Portugal was faced with UN-sponsored sanctions, Non-Aligned Movement-led defamation, and myriad boycotts and protests performed by both foreign and domestic political organizations, like the clandestine Portuguese Communist Party (PCP). Near the end of the conflict, a report by the British priest Adrian Hastings, alleging atrocities and war crimes on the part of the Portuguese military, was printed a week before the Portuguese prime minister Marcelo Caetano was due to visit Britain to celebrate the 600th anniversary of the Anglo-Portuguese alliance in 1973. Portugal's growing isolation following Hastings's claims has often been cited as a factor that helped to bring about the "carnation revolution" coup in Lisbon which deposed the Caetano regime in 1974, ending the Portuguese African counter-insurgency campaigns and triggering the rapid collapse of the Portuguese Empire.

=== Guerrilla movements ===
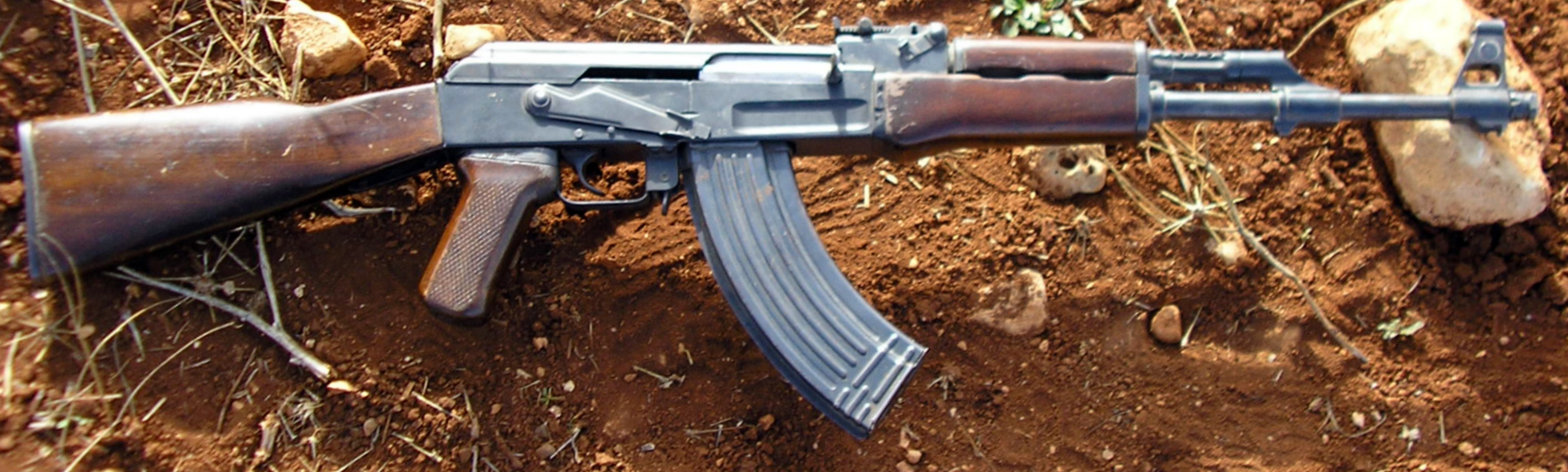
AKM assault rifles were widely used by the African guerrilla movements.

The armament of the nationalist groups came mainly from the Soviet Union, China, Cuba, Eastern Europe. However, they also used small arms of U.S. manufacture (such as the .45 M1 Thompson submachine gun), along with British, French, and German weapons came from neighboring countries sympathetic to the rebellion. Later in the war, most guerrillas would use roughly the same infantry rifles of Soviet origin: the Mosin–Nagant bolt-action rifle, the SKS carbine, and most importantly the AKM series of 7.62×39mm assault rifle, or Kalashnikov. Rebel forces also made extensive use of machine guns for ambush and positional defense.

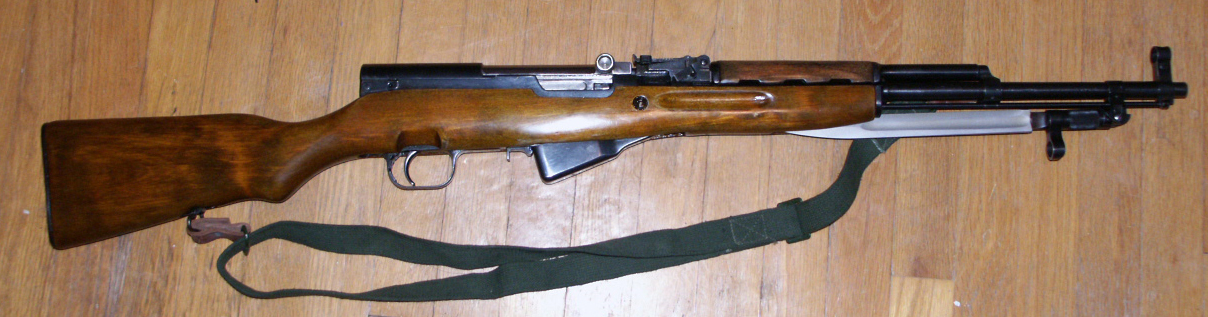
SKS semi-automatic rifles were also used by guerrillas.

Rapid-fire arms in use with the insurgents included the 7.62×54mmR DP-28, the 7.62×39mm RPD machine gun (the most widely used of all), the 8×57mm Mauser MG 34 general-purpose machine gun, together with the 12.7×108mm DShK and the 7.62×54mm SG-43 Goryunov heavy machine guns, 7.62×25mm PPSh-41 and PPS-43, 9×19mm Sa vz. 23, Sterling, MP 40, MAT-49 submachine gun operation. Support weapons included mortars, recoilless rifles, and in particular, Soviet-made rocket launchers, the RPG-2 and RPG-7. Anti-aircraft (AA) weapons were also employed, especially by the PAIGC and the FRELIMO. The 14.5×114mm ZPU AA cannon was the most widely used, but by far the most effective was the Strela 2 missile, first introduced to guerrilla forces in Guinea in 1973 and in Mozambique the following year by Soviet technicians.

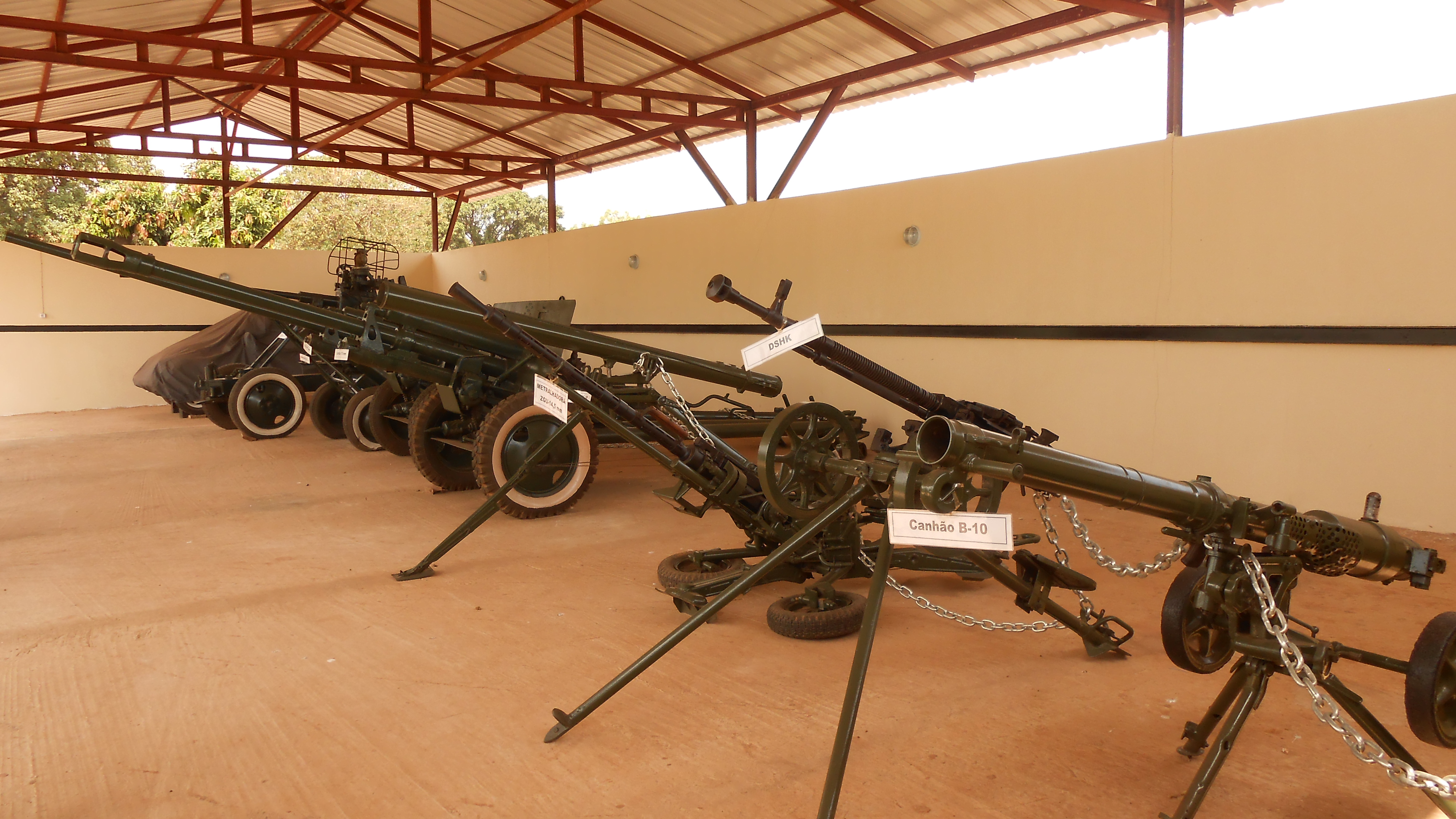
Heavy equipment used by the PAIGC now on display at Bissau

The guerrillas' AKM rifles and such variants were highly thought of by many Portuguese soldiers, as they were more mobile than the m/961 (G3), while permitting the user to deliver a heavy volume of automatic fire at the closer ranges typically encountered in bush warfare. The AKM's ammunition load was also lighter. The average Angolan or Mozambican rebel could easily transport 150 7.62×39mm cartridges (five 30-round magazines) on his person during bush operations, compared to 100 7.62×51mm rounds (five 20-round magazines) typically carried by a Portuguese infantryman on patrol. Though a common misconception holds that Portuguese soldiers used captured AKM type weapons, this was only true of a few elite units for special missions. Like U.S. forces in Vietnam, ammunition resupply difficulties and the obvious danger of being mistaken for a guerrilla when firing an enemy weapon generally precluded their use.

Mines and other booby traps were one of the principal weapons used by the insurgents against Portuguese mechanized forces to great effect, who typically patrolled the mostly unpaved roads of their territories using motor vehicles and armored scout cars. To counter the mine threat, Portuguese engineers commenced the herculean task of tarring the rural road network. Mine detection was accomplished not only by electronic mine detectors, but also by employing trained soldiers (picadors) walking abreast with long probes to detect nonmetallic road mines.

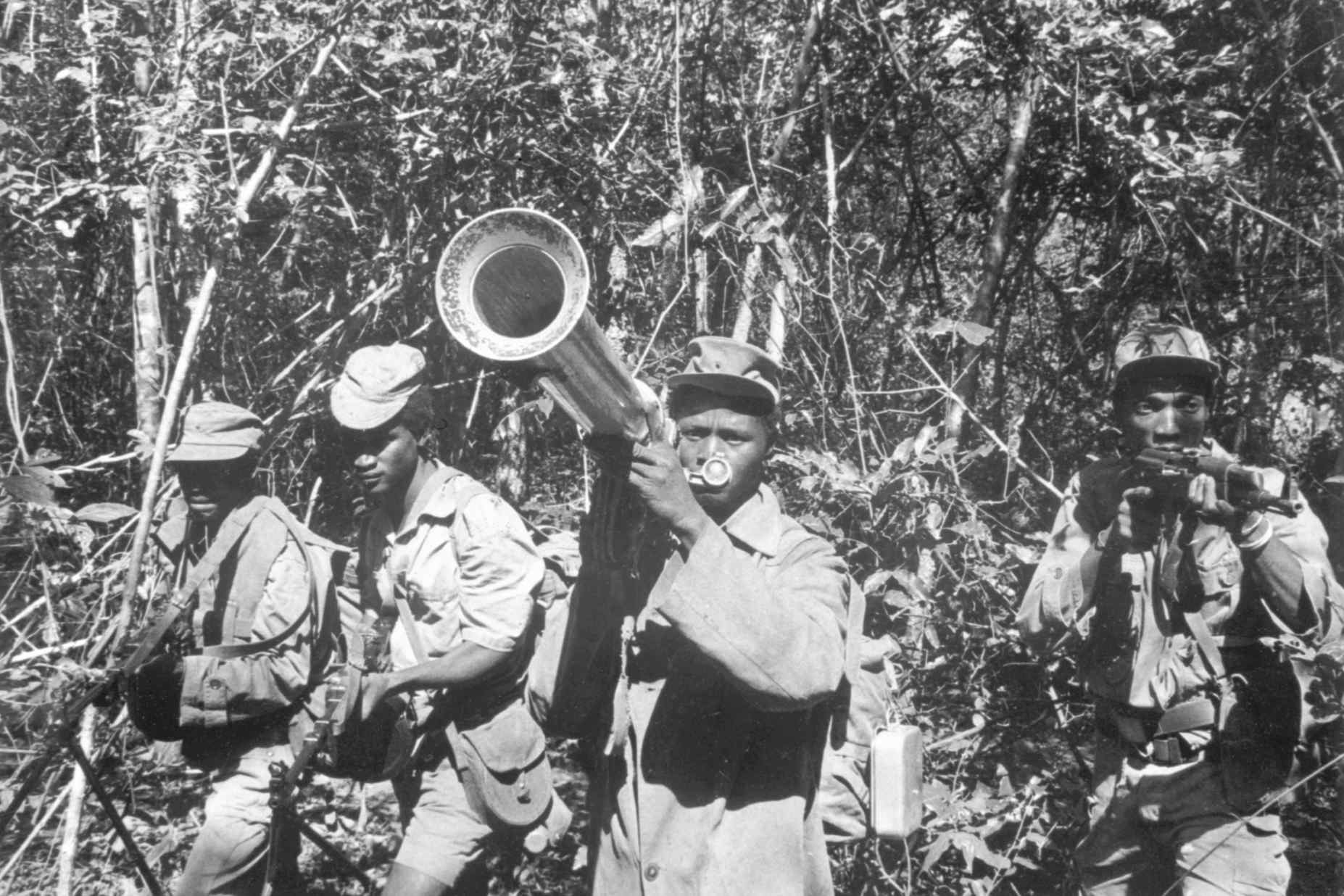
PAIGC guerrillas with rocket launchers and submachineguns.

Guerrillas in all the various revolutionary movements used a variety of mines, often combining anti-tank with anti-personnel mines to ambush Portuguese formations with devastating results. A common tactic was to plant large anti-vehicle mines in a roadway bordered by obvious cover, such as an irrigation ditch, then seed the ditch with anti-personnel mines. Detonation of the vehicle mine would cause Portuguese troops to deploy and seek cover in the ditch, where the anti-personnel mines would cause further casualties.

If the insurgents planned to confront the Portuguese openly, one or two heavy machine guns would be sited to sweep the ditch and other likely areas of cover. Other mines used included the PMN (Black Widow), TM-46, and POMZ. Even amphibious mines were used such as the PDM, along with numerous home-made antipersonnel wood box mines and other nonmetallic explosive devices. The impact of mining operations, in addition to causing casualties, undermined the mobility of Portuguese forces, while diverting troops and equipment from security and offensive operations to convoy protection and mine clearance missions.

In general, the PAIGC in Guinea was the best armed, trained and led of all the guerrilla movements. By 1970, it even had candidates training in the Soviet Union, learning to fly Mikoyan-Gurevich MiG-15 jets and to operate Soviet-supplied amphibious assault craft and APCs.

== Opposition in Portugal ==
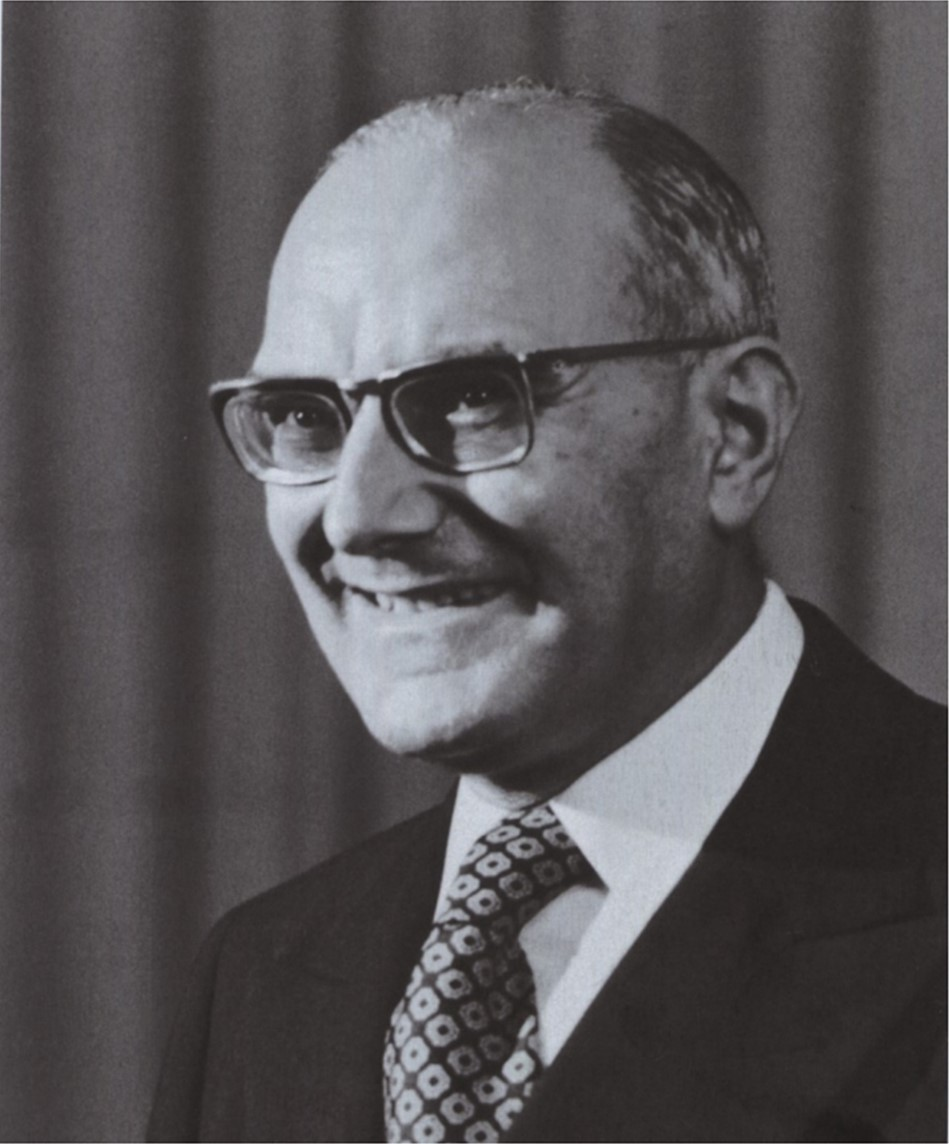
Marcello Caetano, who succeeded Salazar in the premiership of Portugal in 1968.

The government presented as a general consensus that the colonies were a part of the national unity, closer to overseas provinces than to true colonies. The communists were the first party to oppose the official view, since they saw the Portuguese presence in the colonies as an act against the colonies' right to self determination. During its 5th Congress, in 1957, the illegal Portuguese Communist Party (Partido Comunista Português – PCP) was the first political organization to demand the immediate and total independence of the colonies.

However, being the only truly organized opposition movement, the PCP had to play two roles. One role was that of a communist party with an anti-colonialist position; the other role was to be a cohesive force drawing together a broad spectrum of opposing parties. Therefore, it had to accede to views that did not reflect its true anticolonial position.

Several opposition figures outside the PCP also had anticolonial opinions, such as the candidates to the fraudulent presidential elections, like Norton de Matos (in 1949), Quintão Meireles (in 1951), and Humberto Delgado (in 1958). The communist candidates had the same positions. Among them were Rui Luís Gomes and Arlindo Vicente; the former was not allowed to participate in the election, and the latter supported Delgado in 1958.

After the electoral fraud of 1958, Humberto Delgado formed the Independent National Movement (Movimento Nacional Independente – MNI) that, in October 1960, agreed that there was a need to prepare the people in the colonies, before giving them the right of self-determination. Despite this, no detailed policies for achieving this goal were set out.

In 1961, the nº8 of the Military Tribune had as its title "Let's end the war of Angola". The authors were linked to the Patriotic Action Councils (Juntas de Acção Patriótica – JAP), supporters of Humberto Delgado, and responsible for the attack on the barracks of Beja. The Portuguese National Liberation Front (Frente Portuguesa de Libertação Nacional – FPLN), founded in December 1962, attacked the conciliatory positions. The official feeling of the Portuguese state, despite all this, was the same: Portugal had inalienable and legitimate rights over the colonies and this was what was transmitted through the media and through the state propaganda.

In April 1964, the Directory of Democratic-Social Action (Acção Democrato-Social – ADS) presented a political solution rather than a military one. In agreement with this initiative in 1966, Mário Soares suggested there should be a referendum on the overseas policy Portugal should follow, and that the referendum should be preceded by a national discussion to take place in the six months prior to the referendum.

The end of Salazar's rule in 1968, due to illness, did not prompt any change in the political panorama. The radicalization of the opposition movements started with the younger people who also felt victimized by the continuation of the war.

=== Radicalization (early 1970s) ===
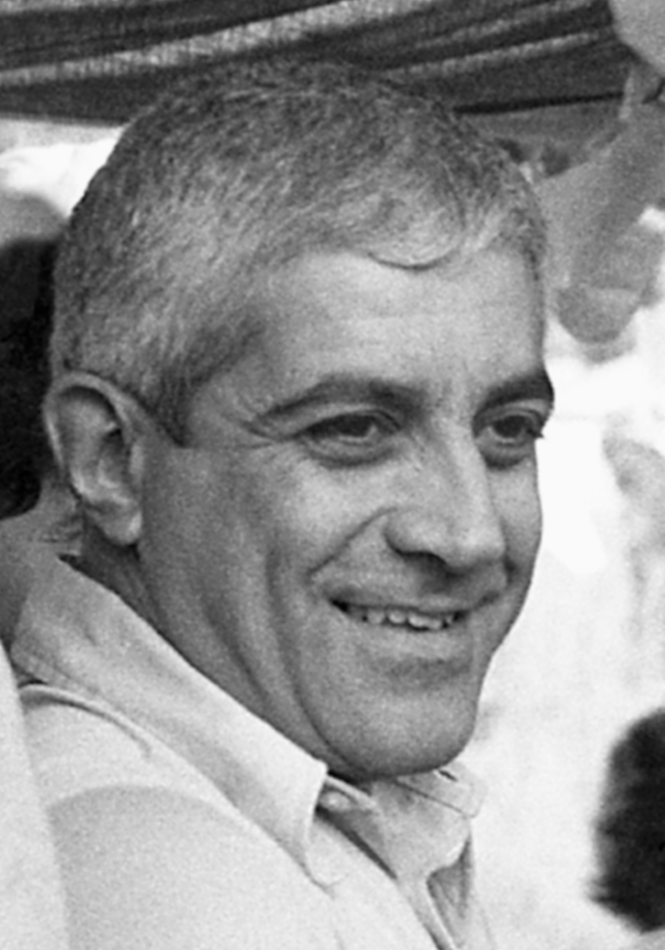
Captain Otelo Saraiva de Carvalho, chief organizer of the 1974 coup.

The universities played a key role in the spread of this position. Several magazines and newspapers were created, such as Cadernos Circunstância, Cadernos Necessários, Tempo e Modo, and Polémica that supported this view. The students that participated in this underground opposition faced serious consequences if caught by the PIDE—from immediate arrest to automatic conscription into a combat branch (infantry, marines, etc.) situated in the "hot" warzone (Guinea, Tete Province in Mozambique or eastern Angola). It was in this environment that the Armed Revolutionary Action (Acção Revolucionária Armada – ARA), the armed branch of the Portuguese Communist Party created in the late 1960s, and the Revolutionary Brigades (Brigadas Revolucionárias – BR), a left-wing organization, became a force of resistance against the war, carrying out multiple acts of sabotage and bombing against military targets.

The ARA began its military actions in October 1970, keeping them up until August 1972. The major actions were the attack on the Tancos air base that destroyed several helicopters on 8 March 1971, and the attack on the NATO headquarters at Oeiras in October of the same year. The BR, on its side, began armed actions on 7 November 1971, with the sabotage of the NATO base at Pinhal de Armeiro, the last action being carried out 9 April 1974, against the Niassa ship which was preparing to leave Lisboa with troops to be deployed in Portuguese Guinea. The BR acted even in the colonies, placing a bomb in the Military Command of Bissau on 22 February 1974.

By the early 1970s, the Portuguese Colonial War raged on, consuming fully 40 percent of Portugal's annual budget. The Portuguese military was overstretched despite mobilizing 7% of the country's total population and there was no political solution or end in sight. While the human losses were relatively small, the war as whole had already entered its second decade. The Portuguese ruling regime of Estado Novo faced criticism from the international community and was becoming increasingly isolated. It had a profound impact on Portugal—thousands of young men avoided conscription by emigrating illegally, mainly to France and the US.

The war in the Portuguese overseas territories of Africa was increasingly unpopular in Portugal itself as the people got weary of war and balked at its ever-rising expense. Many ethnic Portuguese of the African overseas territories were also increasingly willing to accept independence if their economic status could be preserved. In addition, younger Portuguese military academy graduates resented a program introduced by Marcello Caetano whereby militia officers who completed a brief training program and had served in the overseas territories' defensive campaigns, could be commissioned at the same rank as military academy graduates.

Caetano's government had begun the program (which included several other reforms) in order to increase the number of officials employed against the African insurgencies, and at the same time cut down military costs to alleviate an already overburdened government budget. Thus, the group of revolutionary military insurgents started as a military professional class protest of Portuguese Armed Forces captains against a decree law: the Dec. Lei nº 353/73 of 1973, organizing themselves in a loosely allied group known as the Movimento das Forças Armadas (MFA).

=== Carnation Revolution (1974) ===
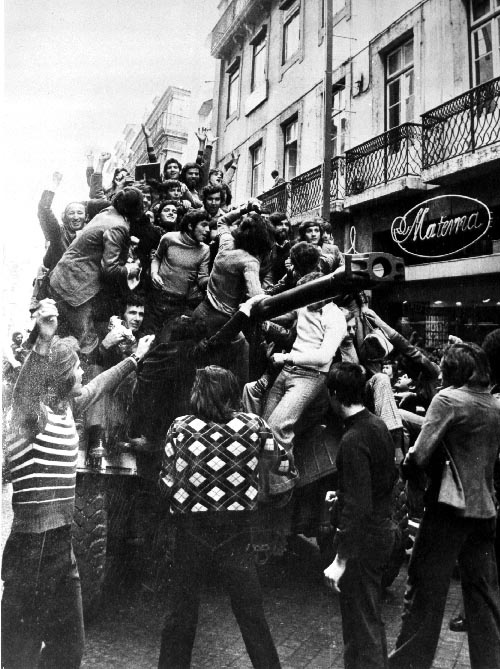
Celebrations following the coup in Portugal.

Faced with government inflexibility over proposed reforms, some Portuguese junior military officers, many from underprivileged backgrounds and increasingly attracted to the Marxist philosophy of their African insurgent opponents, began to move the MFA to the political left. On 25 April 1974, Portuguese military officers of the MFA staged a bloodless military coup that toppled António de Oliveira Salazar's successor Marcelo Caetano, and successfully overthrew the Estado Novo regime.

The revolt later became known as the Carnation Revolution. General Spínola was invited to assume the office of President, but resigned a few months later after it became clear that his desire to set up a system of federalized home rule for the African territories was not shared by the rest of the MFA, who wanted an immediate end to the war (achievable only by granting independence to the provinces of Portuguese Africa). The 25 April coup led to a series of temporary governments, marked by a nationalization of many important areas of the economy.

== Aftermath ==
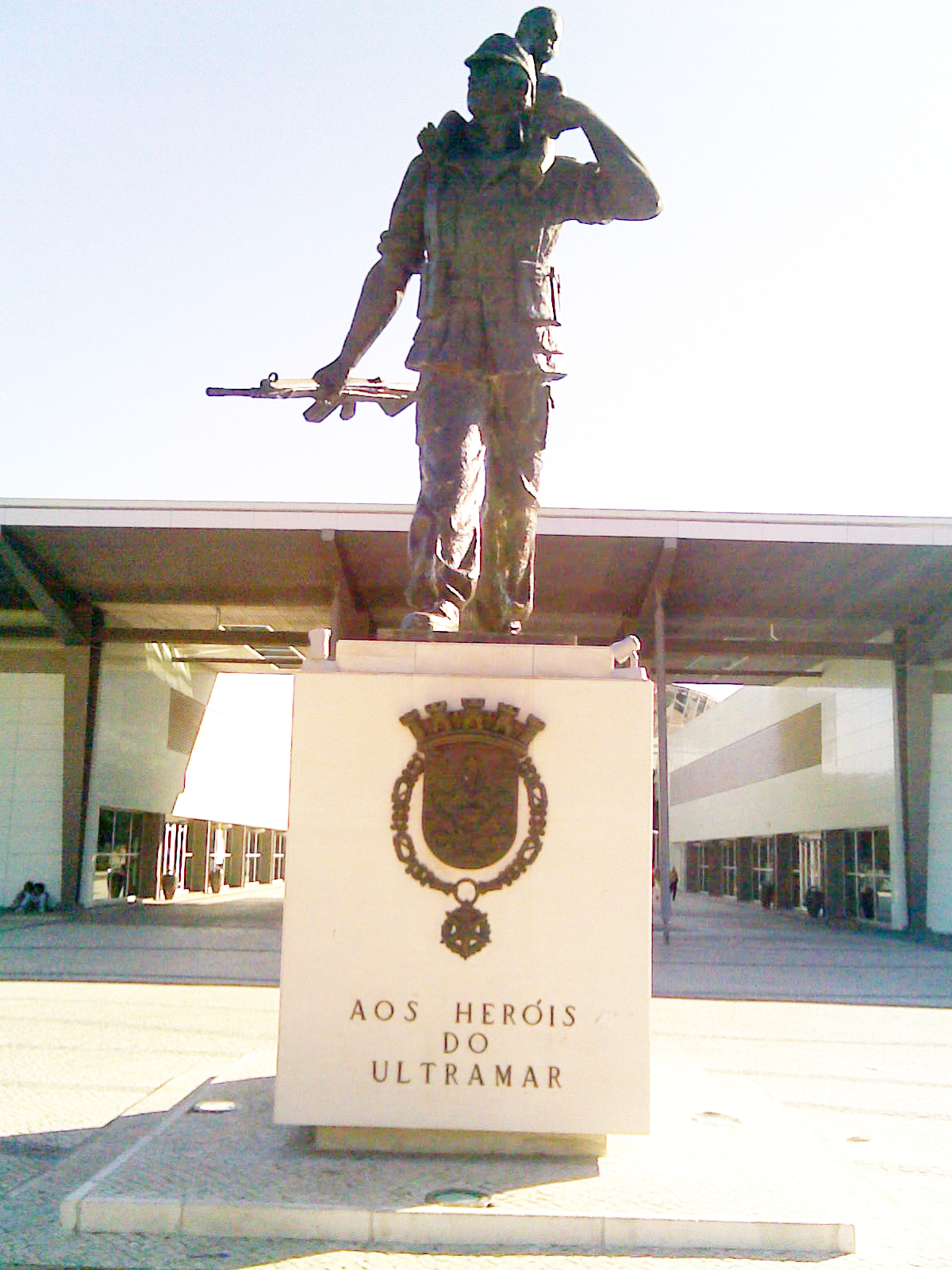
Portuguese soldier with black Afro-Portuguese child, a monument to the Portuguese Overseas Territories' Heroes (Heróis do Ultramar), in Coimbra, Portugal.

After the coup on 25 April 1974, while the power struggle for control of Portugal's government was occurring in Lisbon, many Portuguese Army units serving in Africa simply ceased field operations, in some cases ignoring orders to continue fighting and withdrawing into barracks, in others negotiating local ceasefire agreements with insurgents.

On 26 August 1974, after a series of diplomatic meetings, Portugal and the PAIGC signed an accord in Algiers, Algeria in which Portugal agreed to remove all troops by the end of October and to recognize the Republic of Guinea-Bissau government controlled by the PAIGC.

In June 1975, after a period of eight months under which Mozambique had been administered by a provisional government, representatives of the Portuguese government and FRELIMO signed an agreement to grant independence to Mozambique, with the president of FRELIMO to assume the presidency of the newly independent nation. This was followed the next month by the announcement of the independence of Cape Verde, and the establishment of a new nation, the Republic of Cape Verde.

In Angola, the Alvor Agreement was signed on 15 January 1975, granting Angola independence from Portugal on 11 November 1975. The Alvor Agreement formally ended the war for independence. The agreement, while signed by the MPLA, the FNLA, UNITA, and the Portuguese government, was never signed by the Front for the Liberation of the Enclave of Cabinda or the Eastern Revolt as the other parties had excluded them from the peace negotiations. The coalition government established by the Alvor Agreement soon fell apart as the various nationalist parties each attempted to seize power. Unable to broker a new compromise, in November 1975 Portugal's last African High Commissioner Rosa Coutinho hauled down his nation's flag and departed Angola.

According to Guilherme Alpoim Calvão, for a brief time after the 25 April Coup (May 1974 – November 1975), Portugal was on the brink of Civil war between left-wing hardliners (Vasco Gonçalves, Otelo Saraiva de Carvalho and others) and the moderate forces (Francisco da Costa Gomes, António Ramalho Eanes and others). On 25 November 1975 the far left forces in Portugal attempted to execute a military coup d'état against the post-Carnation Revolution governing bodies of Portugal. The Portuguese government eventually won, preventing Portugal from becoming a communist state.

By 1975, Portugal had converted to a democratic government. The effects of having to integrate hundreds of thousands of returning Portuguese from the former African provinces (collectively known as retornados), and political and economic turmoil resulting from the military coup and successive governments would cripple the Portuguese economy for decades to come.

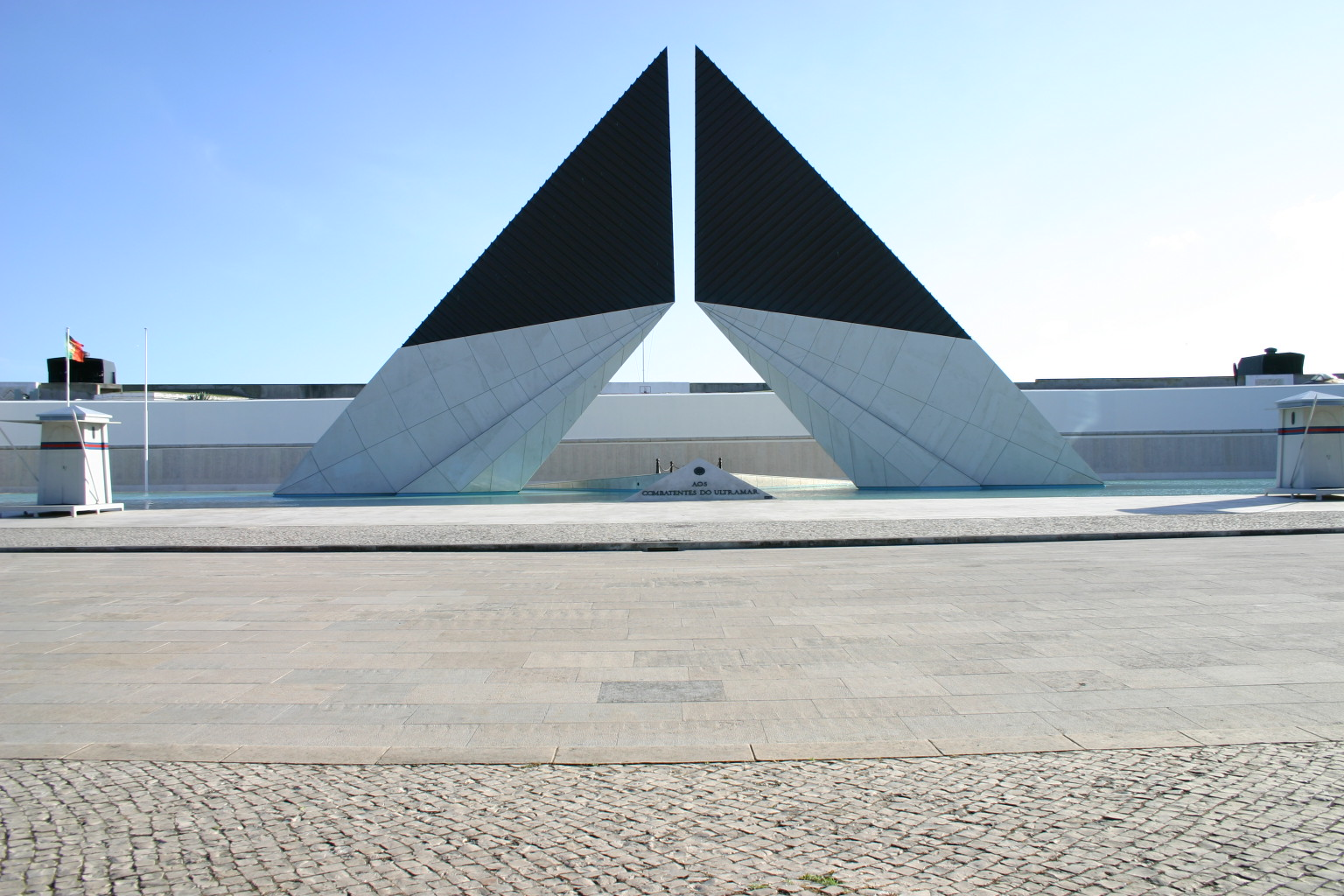
Monument in Lisbon to Portuguese soldiers who died in the Overseas War (1961–1976).

=== Impact in Africa ===
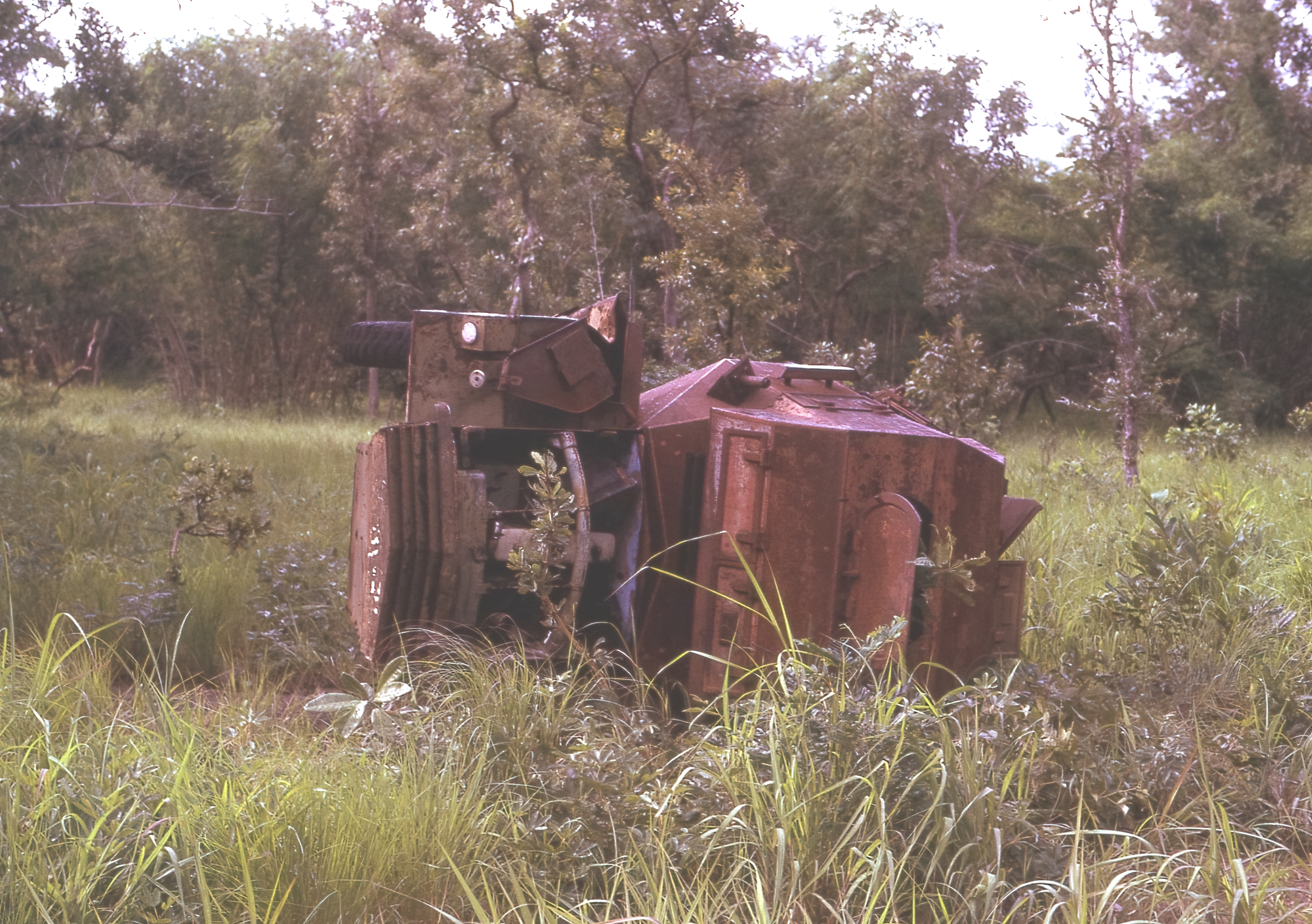
Remains of an armoured car in Medina do Boé, Guinea-Bissau

Portugal had been the first European power to establish a colony in Africa since Antiquity when it captured Ceuta in 1415 and now it was one of the last to leave. The departure of the Portuguese from Angola and Mozambique increased the isolation of Rhodesia, where white minority rule ended in 1980 when the territory gained international recognition as the Republic of Zimbabwe with Robert Mugabe as the head of government. The former Portuguese territories in Africa became sovereign states with Agostinho Neto (followed in 1979 by José Eduardo dos Santos) in Angola, Samora Machel (followed in 1986 by Joaquim Chissano) in Mozambique and Luís Cabral (followed in 1980 by Nino Vieira) in Guinea-Bissau, as heads of state.

In contrast to some other European colonial possessions, many of the Portuguese living in Portuguese Africa had strong ties to their adopted land, as their ancestors had lived in Africa for generations. For these individuals, the prospect of Portugal's imminent departure from its African territories was nearly impossible to comprehend. Nevertheless, most accepted the inevitable, and while an abortive right-wing settler revolt broke out in Mozambique, it quickly died out as Portuguese coup leaders made it clear that the decision to grant independence was irrevocable.

Fear of reprisals and impending changes in political and economic status by the Marxist governments of the new African states resulted in the peaceful exodus of over one million Portuguese citizens of European, African and mixed ethnicity from the newly independent African territories to Portugal, Brazil, South Africa, and other countries.

=== New governments of Angola and Mozambique ===
The new governments of Angola and Mozambique, faced a severe set of challenges as devastating civil wars broke out in both countries. Lasting several decades, these ongoing conflicts would eventually claim over two million lives and an even greater number of refugees, while destroying much of the infrastructure in both nations. Resentments over economic difficulties caused by failed government policies, the general disenfranchisement of political opponents, and widespread corruption at the highest levels of government eroded the initial optimism present at independence. These problems were exacerbated by a tendency to consolidate power by directing public anger against ethnic Portuguese, mixed-race Africans, and those who had supported the former colonial regime.

Many of the local black soldiers that served in the Portuguese Army and who had fought against the insurgents were demobilized by Portuguese authorities and left behind in Africa. The most infamous reprisal occurred in Guinea-Bissau. Demobilized by the Portuguese authorities and abandoned to their fate, a total of 7,447 black African soldiers who had served in Portuguese native commando forces and militia were summarily executed by the PAIGC after Portuguese forces ceased hostilities. In a statement in the party newspaper Nô Pintcha (In the Vanguard), a spokesman for the PAIGC revealed that many of the ex-Portuguese indigenous African soldiers that were executed after cessation of hostilities were buried in unmarked collective graves in the woods of Cumerá, Portogole, and Mansabá.

Because the political regimes involved in wars or counterinsurgency tend to minimize unfavorable news stories about their military actions, many Portuguese remained unaware of the atrocities committed by the colonial regimes and the army. In 2007, a Radiotelevisao Portuguesa (RTP) documentary by Joaquim Furtado, made public both these government-supported atrocities and the organized massacres and terror campaign policies of some pro-independence guerrilla movements or their supporters; it was watched by over a million people, a tenth of the population at the time.

With the fall of the Estado Novo regime, most Portuguese citizens, tired of the long war and their isolation from the world community under the Caetano regime, supported the decision to recognize the independence of Portuguese Africa immediately, while accepting the inevitable loss of their former overseas territories. However, controversies over the MFA coup of 25 April 1974 and the decisions made by coup leaders remain to this day.

=== Economic consequences of the war ===
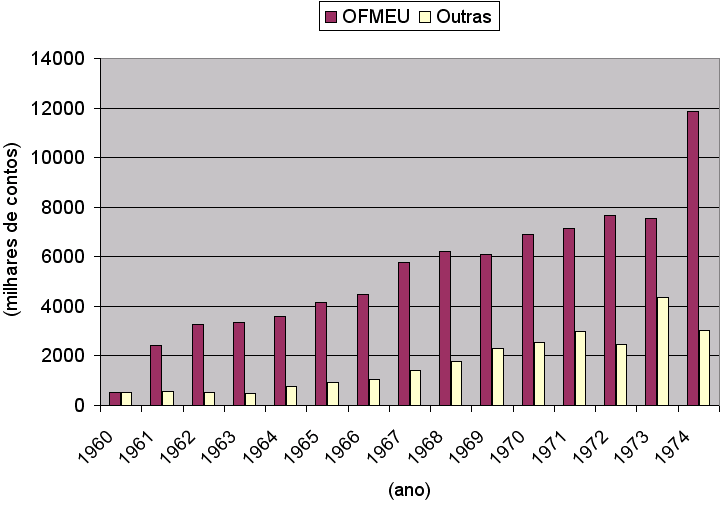
Evolution of the expenditure of the Portuguese state with the military during the war.

In Portugal, government budgets increased significantly during the war years. The country's expenditure on the armed forces ballooned since the beginning of the war in 1961. The expenses were divided into ordinary and extraordinary ones; the latter were the main factor in the huge increase in the military budget. The succession of Marcelo Caetano, after Salazar's incapacitation, resulted in steady increases in military spending on the African wars through 1972. Over the period 1961–1974, 22% of total state expenditure (approximately 3.1% of GDP) was spent on the war.

On 13 November 1972, a sovereign wealth fund was enacted through the Decree Law Decreto-Lei n.º 448/ /72 and the Ministry of Defense ordinance Portaria 696/72, in order to finance the counterinsurgency effort in the Portuguese overseas territories. While the counterinsurgency war was won in Angola, it was less than satisfactorily contained in Mozambique and dangerously stalemated in Portuguese Guinea from the Portuguese point of view, so the Portuguese Government decided to create sustainability policies in order to allow continuous sources of financing for the war effort in the long run. In addition, new Decree Laws (Decree Law: Decretos-Leis n.os 353, de 13 de Julho de 1973, e 409, de 20 de Agosto) were enforced in order to cut down military expenses and increase the number of officers by incorporating militia and military academy officers in the Army branches as equals.

In mainland Portugal, the growth rate of the economy during the war years ranged from 6–11%, and in post war years 2–3%. This is substantially higher than the vast majority of other European nations. Other indicators like GDP as percentage of Western Europe would indicate that Portugal was rapidly catching up to its European neighbors. In 1960, at the initiation of Salazar's more outward-looking economic policy influenced by a new generation of technocrats, Portugal's per capita GDP was only 38 percent of the EC-12 average; by the end of the Salazar period, in 1968, it had risen to 48 percent.

In 1973, on the eve of the revolution, Portugal's per capita GDP had reached 56 percent of the EC-12 average. In 1975, the year of maximum revolutionary turmoil, Portugal's per capita GDP declined to 52 percent of the EC-12 average. Convergence of real GDP growth toward the EC average occurred as a result of Portugal's economic resurgence since 1985. In 1991 Portugal's GDP per capita climbed to 55 percent of the EC average, exceeding by a fraction the level attained just during the worst revolutionary period.

For many decades to come after independence, the economies of the three former Portuguese African territories involved in the war continued to remain problematic due to continuing internecine political conflicts and power struggles as well as inadequate agricultural production caused by disruptive government policies resulting in high birth mortality rates, widespread malnutrition, and disease. By the 21st century, the Human Development Index of Angola, Mozambique and Guinea-Bissau, were among the lowest in the world, while corruption and social inequality soared.

After 1974, the deterioration in central planning effectiveness, economic development and growth, security, education and health system efficiency, was rampant. None of the newly independent ex-Portuguese African states made any significant economic progress in the following decades, and political progress in terms of democratic processes and protection of individual human rights was either minimal or nonexistent. With few exceptions, the new regimes ranked at the bottom of human development and GDP per capita world tables. By 2002, however, the end of the Angolan Civil War, combined with exploitation of the country's highly valuable natural resources, resulted in that country becoming economically successful for the first time in decades.

== Films about the war ==
- Os Demonios de Alcacer-Quibir (Portugal 1975, director: Jose Fonseca da Costa).
- La Vita è Bella (Portugal/Italy/USSR 1979, director: Grigory Naumovich Chukhray).
- Sorte que tal Morte (Portugal 1981, director: Joao Matos Silva).
- Acto dos Feitos da Guine (Portugal 1980, director: Fernando Matos Silva).
- Gestos & Fragmentos – Ensaio sobre os Militares e o Poder (Portugal 1982, director: Alberto Seixas Santos).
- Um Adeus Português (Portugal 1985, director: Joao Botelho).
- Era Uma Vez Um Alferes (Portugal 1987, director: Luis Filipe Rocha).
- Matar Saudades (Portugal 1987, director: Fernando Lopes Vasconcelos)
- A Idade Maior (Portugal 1990, director: Teresa Villaverde Cabral).
- "Non", ou A Vã Glória de Mandar (Portugal/France/Spain 1990, director: Manoel de Oliveira).
- Ao Sul (Portugal 1993, director: Fernando Matos Silva).
- Capitães de Abril (Captains of April, Portugal 2000, director: Maria de Medeiros).
- Assalto ao Santa Maria (Assault on the Santa Maria, Portugal 2009, director: Francisco Manso).

== Documentaries ==
- A Guerra – Colonial – do Ultramar – da Libertação, 1st Season (Portugal 2007, director: Joaquim Furtado, RTP)
- A Guerra – Colonial – do Ultramar – da Libertação, 2nd Season (Portugal 2009, director: Joaquim Furtado, RTP)

== See also ==
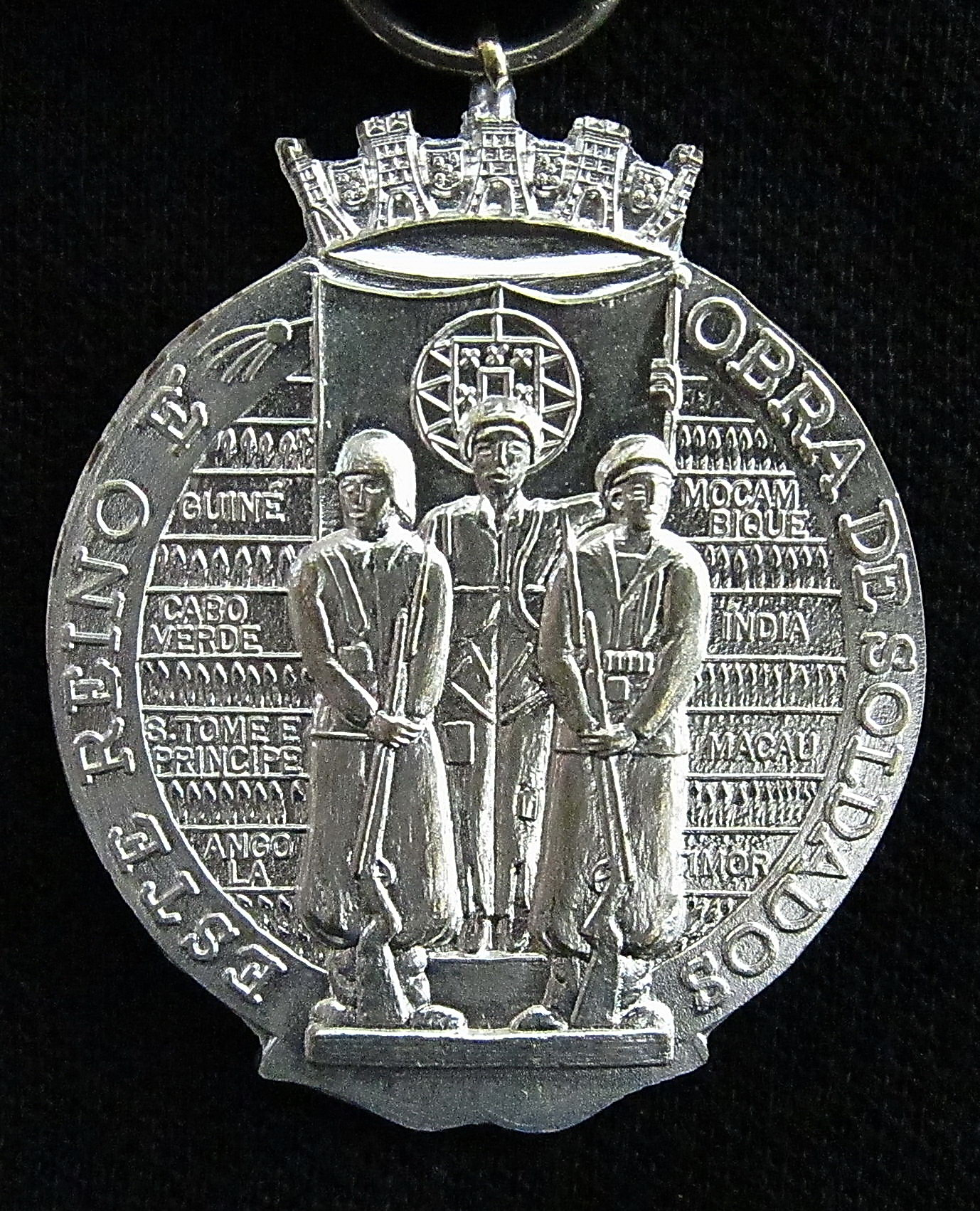
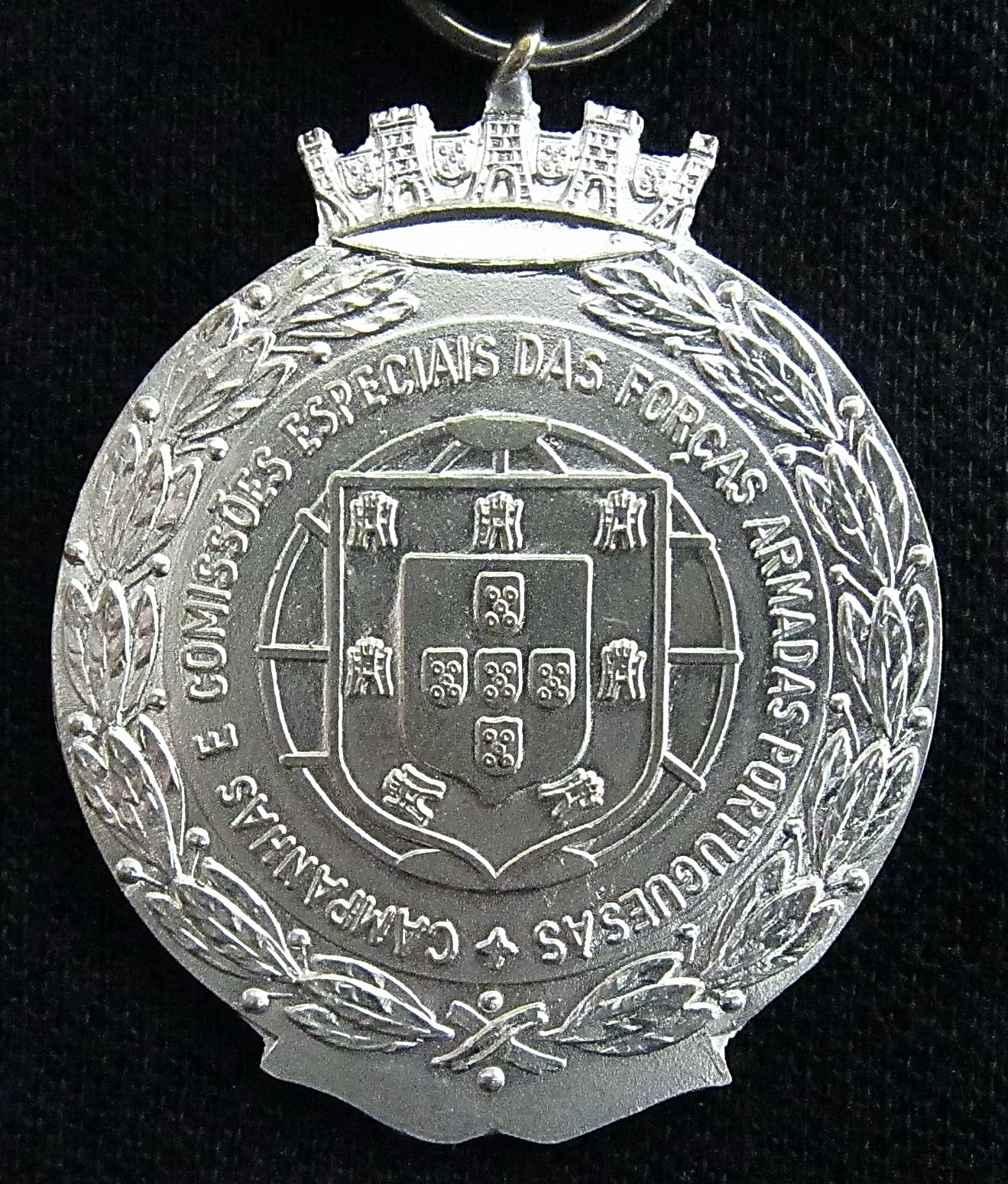
Portuguese commemorative campaign medals.
- Alcora Exercise
- Angolan War of Independence
- Annexation of Goa (Portuguese India)
- Carnation Revolution
- Guinea-Bissau War of Independence
- Lusophobia
- Mozambican War of Independence
- Operation Gordian Knot
- Operation Green Sea

Portuguese military:

- Commandos (Portugal)
- List of weapons of the Portuguese Colonial War
- Paratroopers' Regiment
- Portuguese Armed Forces
- Portuguese Marine Corps
- Portuguese irregular forces in the Overseas War
- Special Operations Troops Centre
- Portuguese Paratroop Nurses

Contemporaneous wars:

- Rhodesian Bush War
- South African Border War

Post-independence wars:

- Angolan Civil War
- Mozambican Civil War

== Bibliography ==
- Afonso, Aniceto and Gomes, Carlos de Matos, Guerra Colonial (2000) ISBN 972-46-1192-2
- Afonso, “A guerra e o fim do regime ditatorial” in J. Medina (1994), História de Portugal, Amadora, Ediclube
- Kaúlza de Arriaga – Published works of the General Kaúlza de Arriaga
- Becket, Ian et al., A Guerra no Mundo, Guerras e Guerrilhas desde 1945, Lisboa, Verbo, 1983
- Cann, John P, Counterinsurgency in Africa: The Portuguese Way of War, 1961–1974, Hailer Publishing, 2005
- Cann, John P, Flight Plan Africa: Portuguese Airpower in Counterinsurgency, 1961–1974, Helion & Company Limited, 2015. ISBN 978-1909982062
- Dávila, Jerry. "Hotel Tropico: Brazil and the challenge of African Decolonization, 1950–1980." Duke University Press, 2010. ISBN 978-0822348559
- Marques, A. H. de Oliveira, História de Portugal, 6ª ed., Lisboa, Palas Editora, Vol. III, 1981
- Jornal do Exército, Lisboa, Estado-Maior do Exército
- Mattoso, José, História Contemporânea de Portugal, Lisboa, Amigos do Livro, 1985, «Estado Novo», Vol. II e «25 de Abril», vol. único
- Mattoso, José, História de Portugal, Lisboa, Ediclube, 1993, vols. XIII e XIV
- Oliveira, Pedro Aires. 2017. "Decolonization in Portuguese Africa." in The Oxford Research Encyclopedia of African History.
- Pakenham, Thomas, The Scramble for Africa, Abacus, 1991 ISBN 0-349-10449-2
- Reis, António, Portugal Contemporâneo, Lisboa, Alfa, Vol. V, 1989;
- Rosas, Fernando e Brito, J. M. Brandão, Dicionário de História do Estado Novo, Venda Nova, Bertrand Editora, 2 vols. 1996
- Telepneva, Natalia. 2022. Cold War Liberation: The Soviet Union and the Collapse of the Portuguese Empire in Africa, 1961–1975. University of North Carolina Press.
- Vários autores, Guerra Colonial, edição do Diário de Notícias
