= List of weapons of the Portuguese Colonial War =

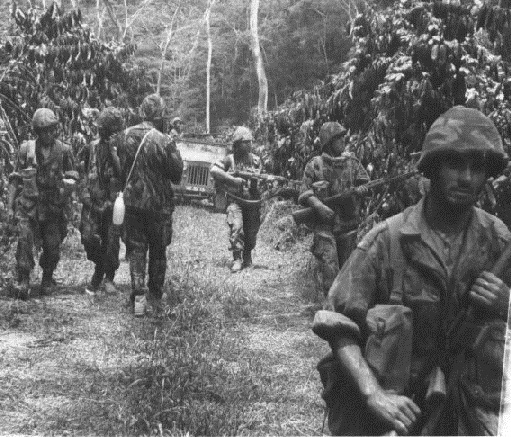
Portuguese Army soldiers in the beginning of the War in Angola. The camouflage uniforms and the FN FAL assault rifles identify them as Caçadores Especiais. At this time, the remaining Army forces still wore yellow khaki field uniforms and were mostly armed with bolt-action rifles.

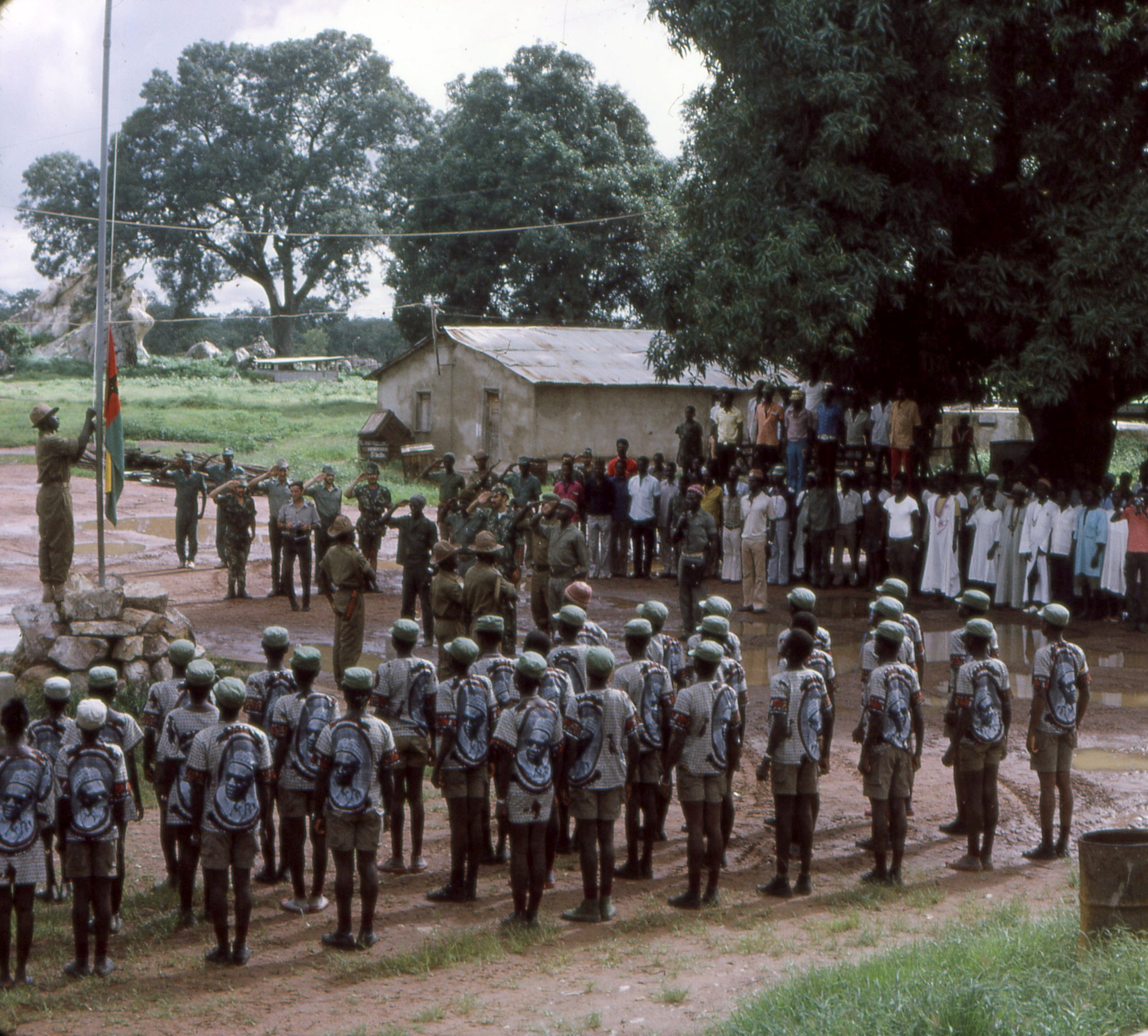
Soldiers of the PAIGC raise the flag of Guinea-Bissau in 1974.

The Portuguese Colonial War (Portuguese: Guerra Colonial), also referred to as the Portuguese Overseas War or Overseas War (Portuguese: Guerra do Ultramar) for short, was a military conflict staged during the Decolonisation of Africa that pitted the guerrilla forces of the African nationalist Liberation movements of the Guinea-Bissau, Angola and Mozambique overseas provinces, which were part of the Portuguese Empire, against the colonial armed and security forces loyal to the authoritarian Estado Novo regime of Portugal, between 1961 and 1975. Main combatants comprised:

- The Portuguese Armed Forces (Portuguese: Forças Armadas), which were backed by the United States, United Kingdom, West Germany, France, Francoist Spain, Belgium, Rhodesia and South Africa, were the official military of Portugal. Subordinated to the Ministry of National Defence and placed under the command of the Secretariat-General of National Defence (Portuguese: Secretariado-Geral da Defesa Nacional – SGDN), of the Portuguese government at the capital Lisbon, the branches were organized as follows:
  - The Portuguese Army (Portuguese: Exército Português)
  - The Portuguese Air Force (Portuguese: Força Aérea Portuguesa), or FAP in the Portuguese acronym but internationally is often referred to by the acronym PRTAF.
  - The Portuguese Navy (Portuguese: Marinha Portuguesa), also known as Marinha de Guerra Portuguesa or as Armada Portuguesa.
- The Portuguese Security Forces, subordinated to the Overseas Ministry (Portuguese: Ministério do Ultramar) in Lisbon:
  - The Public Security Police (Portuguese: Polícia de Segurança Pública – PSP), the uniformed Preventive police (actually, a Colonial police force) of the Portuguese overseas territories, which was modelled after the European Portuguese PSP, the national civil police force of Portugal.
  - The irregular Auxiliary Forces (Portuguese: Forças Auxiliares).
- The African nationalist Liberation movements:
  - The African Party for the Independence of Guinea and Cape Verde (Portuguese: Partido Africano para a Independência da Guiné e Cabo Verde – PAIGC) party (1956–present), and its military wing the Revolutionary Armed Forces of the People (Portuguese: Forças Armadas Revolucionárias do Povo – FARP), which received support from the Soviet Union, East Germany, Poland, Czechoslovakia, the Socialist Republic of Romania, SFR Yugoslavia, the People's Republic of Bulgaria, Sweden, North Korea, the People's Republic of China, Cuba, Libya, Ghana, Senegal, and Guinea-Conacry.
  - The People's Movement for the Liberation of Angola (Portuguese: Movimento Popular de Libertação de Angola – MPLA) party (1956–present), and its military wing the People's Army for the Liberation of Angola (Portuguese: Exército Popular de Libertação de Angola – EPLA), which received support from the Soviet Union, East Germany, Cuba, Morocco, Algeria, Republic of the Congo, Ghana, Guinea-Conacry, Tanzania, and Zambia.
  - The National Front for the Liberation of Angola (Portuguese: Frente Nacional de Libertação de Angola – FNLA) party (1961–present), and its military wing the National Army for the Liberation of Angola (Portuguese: Exército de Libertação Nacional de Angola – ELNA), which received support from the United States, the People's Republic of China, West Germany, Israel, France, the Socialist Republic of Romania, Morocco, Algeria, Tunisia, Ghana, Zaire, and Liberia.
  - The National Union for the Total Independence of Angola (Portuguese: União Nacional para a Independência Total de Angola – UNITA) party (1966–present), and its military wing the Armed Forces of the Liberation of Angola (Portuguese: Forças Armadas de Libertação de Angola – FALA), which received support from the People's Republic of Bulgaria, the People's Republic of China, Egypt, and Zambia.
  - The Front for the Liberation of the Enclave of Cabinda (Portuguese: Frente para a Libertação do Enclave de Cabinda – FLEC) party (1963–present), which received support from the United States, France, Zaire, and South Africa.
  - The Liberation Front of Mozambique (Portuguese: Frente de Libertação de Moçambique – FRELIMO) party (1962–present), and its military wing the Popular Forces for the Liberation of Mozambique (Portuguese: Forças Populares de Libertação de Moçambique – FPLM), which received support from the Soviet Union, East Germany, the People's Republic of Bulgaria, Czechoslovakia, Poland, SFR Yugoslavia, Sweden, Norway, Denmark, the Netherlands, Cuba, the People's Republic of China, Algeria, Libya, Egypt, Republic of the Congo, Tanzania, and Zambia.

An eclectic variety of weapons was used by all sides in the Portuguese Colonial War. The Portuguese Military and Security Forces serving in the African territories were equipped with Western-made weapon systems from both World War I and World War II, mainly Portuguese, Austro-Hungarian, Danish, German, Italian, French, Canadian and British in origin, but also included more modern Portuguese, Spanish, French, British, Belgian, Dutch, West German, American and South African military hardware. During the early phase of the war, the African Liberation Movements likewise were largely equipped with WWII-vintage Western arms and munitions, though as the war went on, Soviet, Eastern Bloc and Chinese weaponry began to play a major role, particularly after 1970.

== Portuguese Military and Security Forces equipment ==
=== Revolvers ===
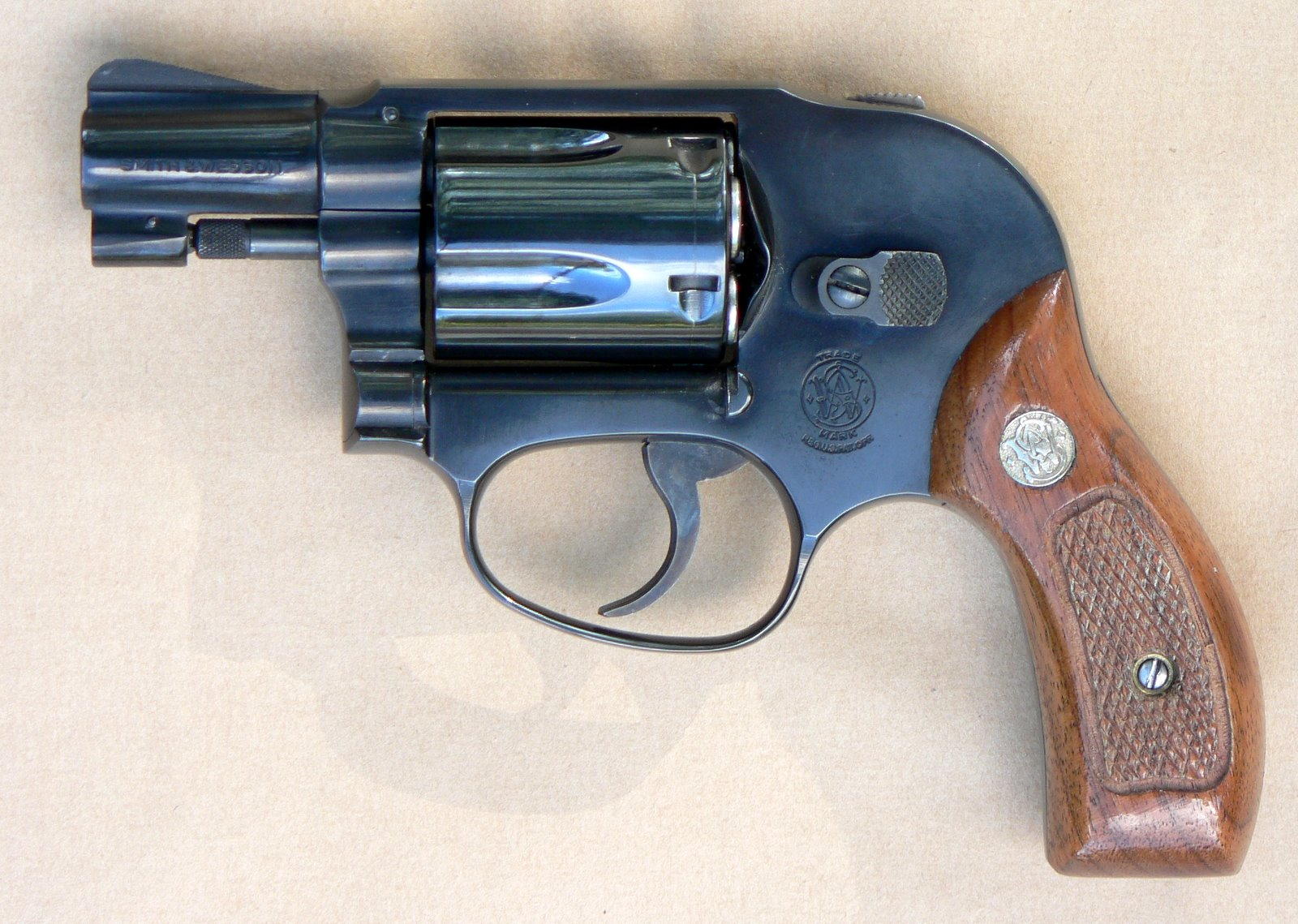
Smith & Wesson Model 49 Bodyguard .38 Special.

Received from the Portuguese Army or privately purchased, used by colonial public servants and officials as personal side-arms for self-defence.

- Revólver m/878 and m/886 Abadie
- Smith & Wesson Model 10
- Smith & Wesson Bodyguard

=== Pistols ===
- Pistola 9 mm m/943 Luger: used early in the War in Angola.
- Pistola 9 mm m/961 Walther: standard service pistol of the Portuguese Army.

=== Submachine guns ===
Pistola-metralhadora FBP m/948.

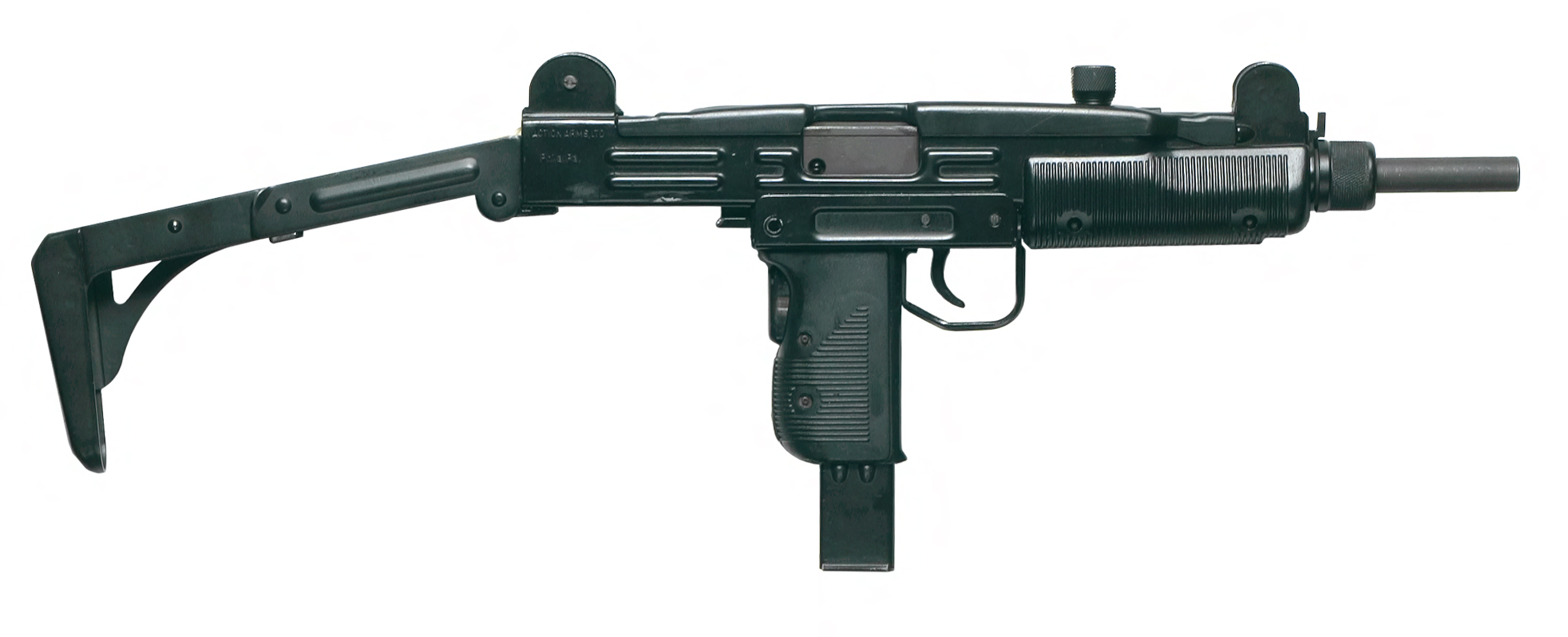
Pistola-metralhadora 9 mm m/961 UZI.

- Pistola-metralhadora 9 mm m/942 Steyer: limited use early in the War.
- Pistola-metralhadora 9 mm m/943 Sten: limited use early in the War.
- Pistola-metralhadora 9 mm m/948 FBP: used early in the War.
- Pistola-metralhadora 9 mm m/961 Vigneron
- Franchi LF-57: used mainly in Angola and Mozambique.
- Star Model Z-45: limited use in the War in Angola.
- Pistola-metralhadora 9 mm m/961 Sterling: used by settler militias early in the War in Angola.
- Pistola-metralhadora 9 mm m/961 UZI: used by the PSP and militia personnel.
- Walther MPK: used by the Portuguese Navy and the Portuguese Marine Corps.

=== Bolt-action rifles ===
- Espingarda de Infantaria 8 mm m/1886/89 Kropatschek Colonial Infantry Rifle: limited use early in the War by militia personnel.
- Mauser–Vergueiro: limited use early in the War by militia personnel.
- Espingarda 7,92 mm m/937 Mauser infantry rifle: standard-issue rifle before the full introduction of the FN FAL and G3 assault rifles; also used by the PSP and militia personnel.
- Espingarda 7,7 mm m/1917, m/1917-A, m/931, m/942, and m/946 Lee–Enfield (SMLE Mk III): used by settler militias early in the War in Angola.
- Pattern 1914 Enfield: used by settler militias early in the War in Angola.
- M1917 Enfield (US modified and produced variant of the Pattern 1914 Enfield rifle): limited use early in the War.

=== Semi-automatic rifles ===
- SKS: Captured from PAIGC guerrillas and re-issued to colonial troops in Guinea-Bissau.

=== Assault rifles ===
- AK-47 and AKS: Captured.
- AKM and AKMS: Captured.

=== Battle rifles ===
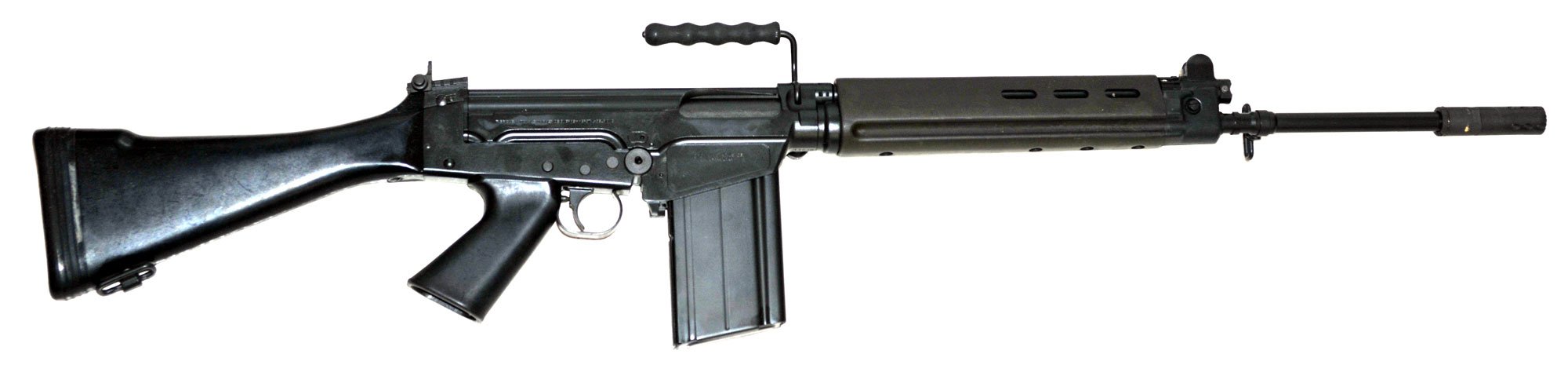
FN FAL assault rifle (50.00 model).

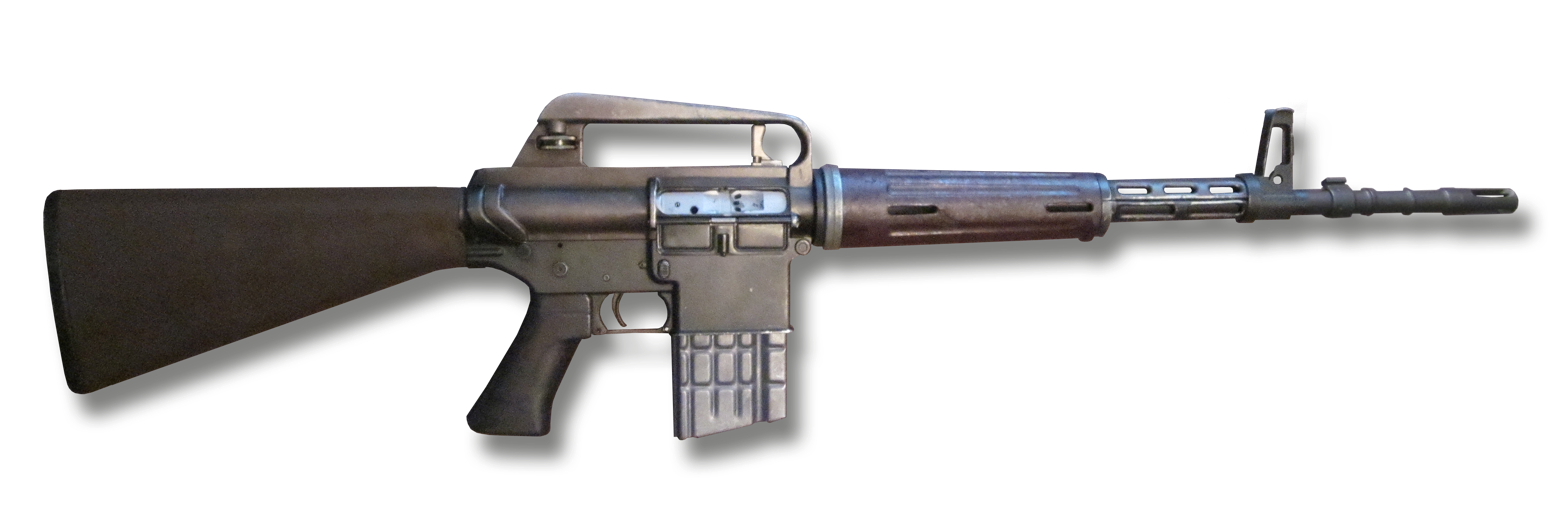
ArmaLite AR-10 assault rifle (Portuguese model).

Espingarda de assalto 7,62 mm m/963 G3.

- Espingarda de assalto 7,62 mm m/961 AR-10
- Espingarda de assalto 7,62 mm m/962 FN FAL: variants employed comprised the Belgium-built standard FAL (50.00 model), the West German G1 and the South African Vektor R1, all used mainly in Guinea-Bissau and Angola.
- Espingarda de assalto 7,62 mm m/961 and m/963 G3: Heckler & Koch G3A3 and G3A4 variants.

=== Sniper rifles ===
- Espingarda de assalto 7,62 mm m/961 AR-10: fitted with A.I.-modified upper receivers to mount 3× or 3.6× telescopic sights, employed as a designated marksman rifle.

=== Light machine guns ===
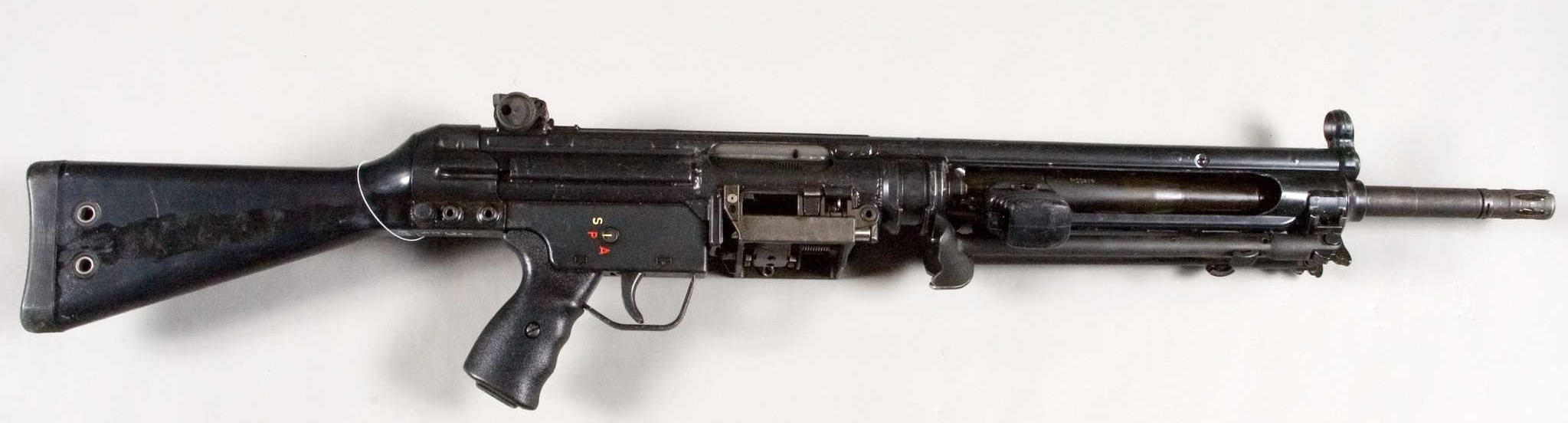
Metralhadora ligeira 7,62 mm m/963 HK21

- Metralhadora ligeira 7,7 mm m/930, 7,9 mm m/940, and 7,9 mm m/930-41 Madsen: used early in the War by armoured cavalry units.
- Metralhadora ligeira 7,92 mm m/938 Dreyse: used early in the War by armoured cavalry units.
- Metralhadora ligeira 7,7 mm m/943 Bren: used early in the War.
- Metralhadora ligeira 7,62 mm m/963 and m/968 HK21 (HK21E variant)
- RPK: Captured.
- RPD: Captured.

=== General-purpose machine guns ===
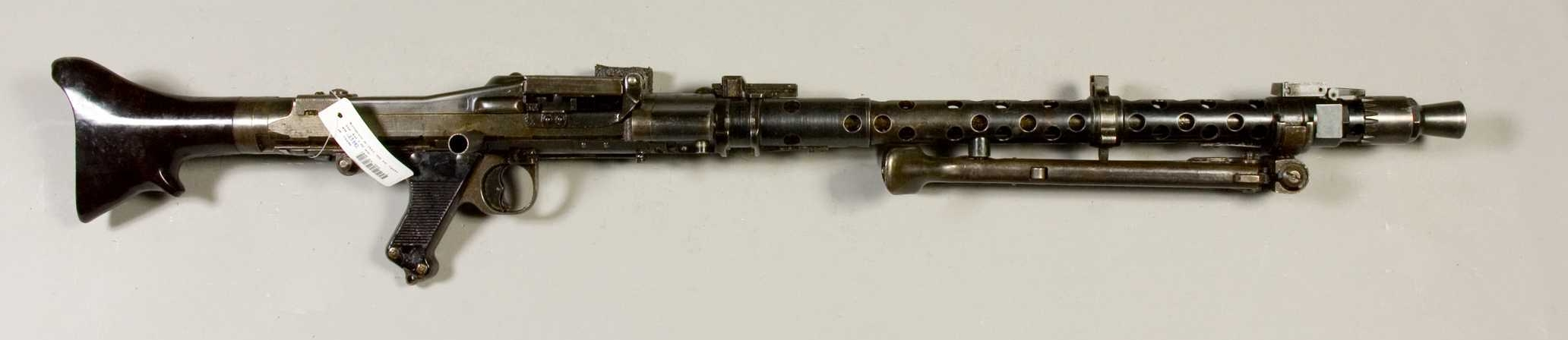
Metralhadora 7,92 mm m/944 MG34 Borsig

- Metralhadora 7,92 mm m/944 MG34 Borsig: used early in the War.
- Metralhadora 7,92 mm m/944 MG42: used early in the War.
- Metralhadora 7,62 mm m/962 MG42 (MG 42/59 variant)
- FN MAG: limited use very late in the War.

=== Medium and Heavy machine guns ===
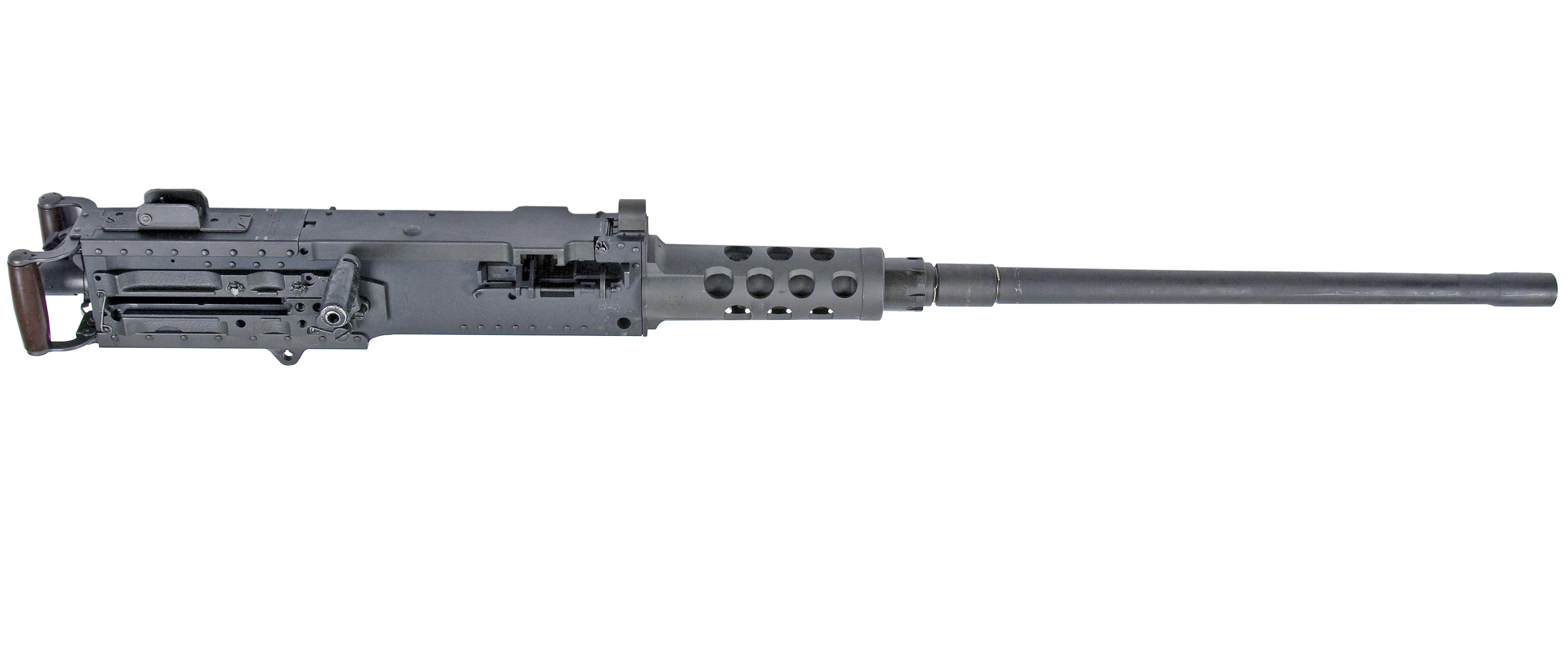
Metralhadora pesada 12,7 mm m/955 Browning M2

- Metralhadora pesada 7,92 mm m/938 Breda: used early in the War.
- Metralhadora 7,62 mm m/952 Browning M1919A4: fitted on Stuart M5A1 light tanks in Angola.
- Metralhadora pesada 12,7 mm m/955 Browning M2: assigned mainly to Anti-aircraft defense.
- SG-43/SGM Goryunov medium machine gun: Captured.
- DShKM 12.7mm Heavy machine gun: Captured.

=== Grenade systems ===
- Granada de mão defensiva M312 m/963 (licence-produced variant of the US M26A1 hand grenade)
- Granada de carga oca Instalaza Tipo I (T-I) and Tipo II (T-II) rifle grenade
- T-2 M-63B bivalent model of the Instalaza rifle grenade
- Granada anti-tanque super Energa mod.2 m/953

=== Land mine systems ===
- M14 anti-personnel mine
- MAPS anti-personnel mine
- M/966 bounding anti-personnel mine (licence-produced copy of the Belgian PRB M966 bounding AP mine)
- M/969 anti-personnel mine (licence-produced copy of the Belgian NR 409 plastic cased AP blast mine)

=== Bombs and explosives ===
- Napalm bomb (designated as "Bomba NAP"): employed by the Portuguese Air Force.
- Trotile demolition charge
- Improvised explosive devices

=== Rocket systems ===
- SNEB 68mm rocket projectile: employed by the Portuguese Air Force.
- Modified SNEB 37mm HE rocket: employed by the Portuguese Air Force and the Portuguese Army.

=== Anti-tank rockets and Grenade launchers ===
- Dispositivo de lançamento de granadas de mão – modelo de 1965 (Dilagrama m/65) detachable grenade launcher
- Lança-granadas-foguete de 60 mm m/955 (US M9A1 Bazooka)
- Lança-granadas-foguete M-20 8,9 mm m/952 (US M20 "Super Bazooka" 3.5-inch)
- Instalaza Modelo-53 88.9 mm (Spanish improved variant of the US M20 "Super Bazooka" 3.5-inch)
- Lança-granadas-foguete de 37 mm "roquetim": Portuguese-produced, man-ported light rocket launcher designed for firing modified SNEB rocket projectiles; not very reliable.
- RPG-2 rocket-propelled grenade launcher: Captured.
- RPG-7 rocket-propelled grenade launcher: Captured.

=== Recoilless rifles ===
- Canhão sem recuo M-18 5,7 cm m/952
- Canhão sem recuo M-20 7,5 cm m/952
- Canhão sem recuo M-40 10,6 cm m/954
- B-10 82mm: Captured.

=== Mortars ===
- FBP m/68 60mm "morteirete": Portuguese-designed ultra-light mortar.
- Morteiro ligeiro de 60 mm m/952
- ECIA L65/60 60mm light mortar
- Morteiro US M2 de 60 mm m/952
- Morteiro de 81 mm m/937
- Morteiro Pesado M30 106.6mm M/951

=== Howitzers ===
- Obus de Montanha 7,5 cm/18 m/940 Mountain gun: employed early in the War in Angola.
- Obus 8,8 cm m/946 Field gun/Howitzer
- Obus médio 11,4 cm m/946 Medium field gun
- Obus médio 14 cm m/943 Medium gun
- Obus K 10,5 cm/28 m/941 Light howitzer
- Obus R 10,5 cm/28 m/943 Light howitzer
- Obus K 15 cm/30 m/941 Heavy field howitzer

=== Anti-aircraft guns and Autocannons ===
- Metralhadora Quádrupla AA 12,7 mm m/953: fitted on Berliet-Tramagal "mine-crusher" trucks, employed in the direct fire support role.
- Matra MG 151/20 20mm autocannon: fitted to Alouette III helicopter gunships.
- Metralhadora Pesada AA 20mm m/943 (2 cm Flak 30/38) Anti-aircraft gun
- Peça AA 4 cm m/942 and m/42-60 Anti-aircraft gun
- Peça AA 9,4 cm m/940 Anti-aircraft gun: limited use late in the War in Guinea-Bissau.

=== Armoured vehicles ===
- Carro de Combate Stuart M5A1 15 ton. 3,7 cm m/1956 light tank: limited use in Angola.
- Blindado Recon. 3 ton. Daimler Mk. IIIA D/ Mk. IIIB D 4×4 m/1963 armoured car: Daimler Dingo Scout Car modified with the addition of a turret-like structure, employed in the road convoy escort role.
- Blindado Recon. 7–8 ton. Humber Mk. IV D 4×4 3,7 cm m/1943 armoured car: used early in the War.
- Blindado Recon. 7–8 ton. GM Fox Mk. I D 4×4 m/1957 armoured car: used early in the War.
- Blindado Recon. Panhard AML-HE60-7 4,8 ton. 6 cm 4×4 m/1965 armoured car: employed in both Angola and Mozambique.
- Blindado Recon. 4,8 ton. Eland Mk. 4 6 cm D 4×4 m/1972 armoured car: South African Eland-60 version of the Panhard AML-HE60-7.
- Blindado Recon. Panhard EBR75 15 ton. 8×8 7,5 cm m/1959 armoured car
- Blindado Transp. Pessoal Panhard ETT 13 ton. 8×8 m/1959 armoured personnel carrier: limited use in Mozambique.
- Panhard M3 VTT armoured personnel carrier: limited use very late in the War in Angola.
- Blindado Transp. Pessoal 5 ton. White M3A1 D 4×4 m/1946 Scout car: employed mainly in Guinea-Bissau.
- GM 4×4 T. T. m/947 "Granadeiro" armoured truck: employed mainly in Guinea-Bissau and Mozambique.
- Blindado Transp. Pessoal 7 ton. Bravia Chaimite V200 D 4×4 m/1967 Armoured personnel carrier: limited use very late in the War in Guinea-Bissau, Angola and Mozambique.

=== Escort, transport and recovery vehicles ===
- Transporte Geral ¼ ton. "Willis" MB 4×4 m/1944
- Transporte Geral Ford GPW ¼ ton. 4×4 m/1944
- Transporte Geral ¼ ton. Willys CJ2 D 4×4 m/1948
- Transporte Geral ¼ ton. Willys CJ3A D 4×4 m/1949
- Transporte Geral Willys-Overland ¾ ton. 4×4 m/1954
- Transporte Geral ¼ ton. Willys CJ3B D 4×4 m/1955
- Transporte Geral ¼ ton. M606 (Kaiser Jeep CJ3B) 4×4 m/1955
- Transporte Geral ¼ ton. M38A1 (Willys MD) D 4×4 m/1955
- Transporte Geral Willys CJ5 ¼ ton. 4×4 m/1957
- Transporte Geral Willys-Overland ¾ ton. 4×4 m/1962
- Transporte Geral ¼ ton. Willys CJ6 D 4×4 m/1969
- Transporte Geral Mitsubichi J54A ¼ ton. 4×4 m/1969
- Transporte Geral ¼ ton. Land-Rover D 4×4 Series I m/1949
- Transporte Geral ¼ ton. Land-Rover D 4×4 Series I m/1954
- Transporte Geral ¼ ton. Land-Rover D 4×4 Series I Mk.2 m/1957
- Transporte Geral ¼ ton. Land-Rover D 4×4 Series II m/1958
- Transporte Geral ¾ ton. Land-Rover D 4×4 Series II m/1958
- Transporte Geral ¾ ton. Land-Rover D 4×4 Series II TP10 m/1959
- Transporte Geral ¼ ton. Austin D 4×4 G4M10 "Gipsy" Series IV m/1965
- Transporte Geral ¾ ton. Austin D 4×4 G4M15 "Gypsy" m/1965
- Transporte Geral ¾ ton. Dodge T214 – WC51 D 4×4 m/1948-50 cx. aberta s/guincho Light truck
- Transporte Geral ¾ ton. Dodge T214 – WC52 D 4×4 m/1948 cx. aberta c/guincho Light truck
- Transporte Geral Nissan 4W73 ¾ ton. 4×4 m/1962
- Viatura de Transporte A 3 ton. Ford Canada F60S 4×4 m/1953
- Transporte Geral Unimog 401/411.115 m/1955 (nicknamed the "Bush Donkey" by the Portuguese)
- Transporte Geral 1 ton. Unimog D 4×4 U34/411 m/1955
- Transporte Geral 1 ½ ton. Unimog D 4×4 S404 m/1966
- Transporte Geral 1 ½ ton. Unimog D 4×4 S404.114 m/1969
- Transporte Geral 2 ½ ton. GMC CCKW-353 D 6×6 m/1952
- Transporte Geral 4 ton. Berliet TBC 8 KT D 4×4 m/1964
- Transporte Geral 4 ton. Berliet/Tramagal GBC 8 KT D 4×4 m/1964
- Transporte Geral 4 ton. Berliet/Tramagal GBC 8 KT D 6×6 m/1966
- Transporte Geral 2,5 ton. Berliet/Tramagal GBA MT D 6×6 m/1968
- Ambulância ¾ ton. Dodge T214 – WC54 D 4×4 m/1944 Ambulance
- Ambulância ¾ ton. Dodge Power Wagon D 4×4 m/1954 Ambulance
- Auto Basculante 4,5 ton, Berliet/Tramagal GBC-8-BT BENNE 4×4 m/1965 Dump truck

=== Helicopters ===
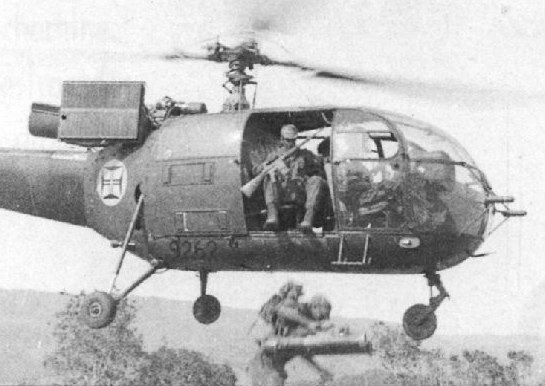
A Portuguese Air Force Aérospatiale Alouette III helicopter deploying paratroopers armed with 7.62mm ArmaLite AR-10 rifles during an assault operation in Angola.

- Aérospatiale SE-3130 Alouette II light helicopter
- Aérospatiale SE-3160 Alouette III light helicopter: employed in the utility and gunship roles.
- Aérospatiale SA 330C Puma medium transport/utility helicopter: employed very late in the War in Angola.

=== Aircraft ===
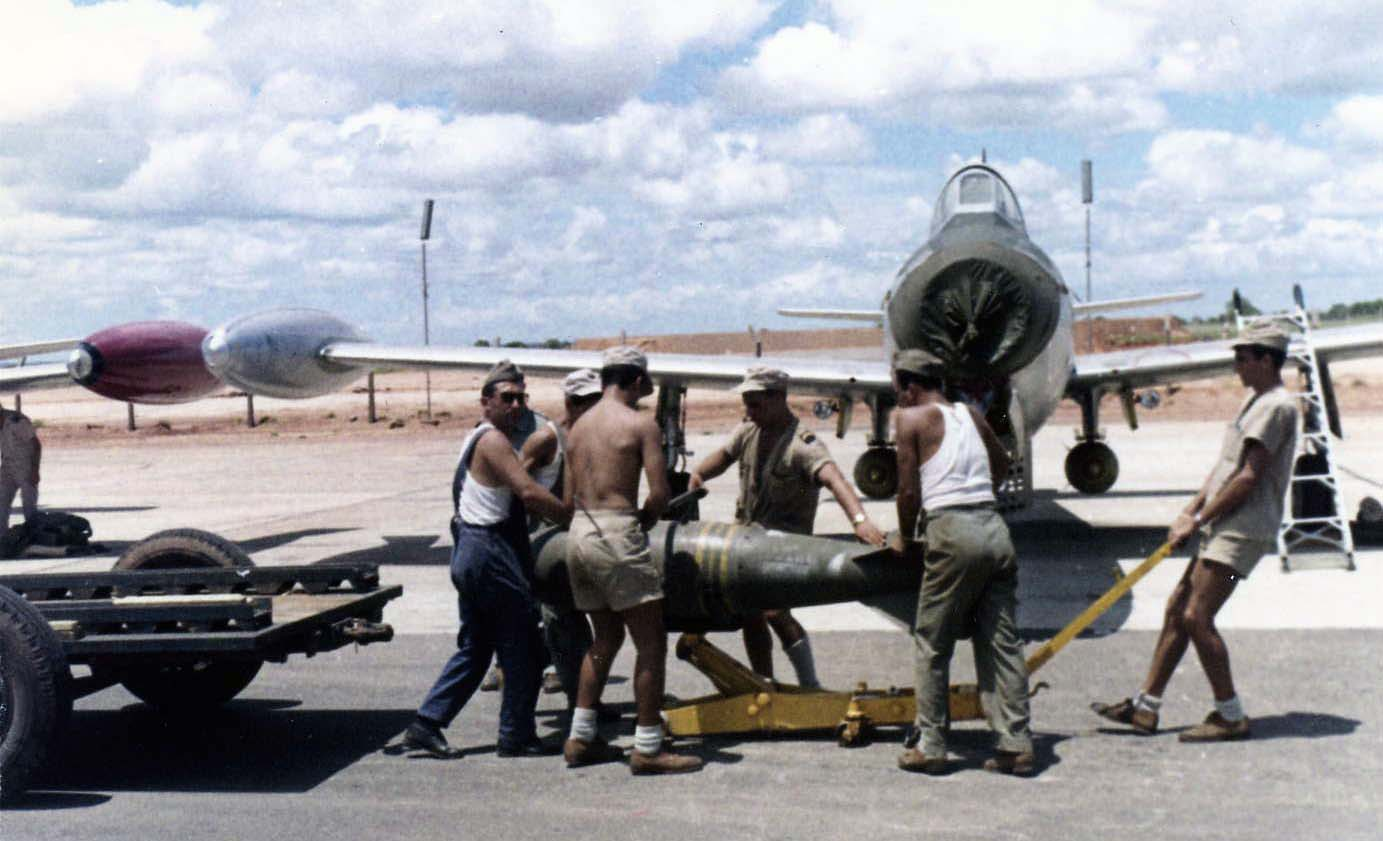
A Portuguese Air Force F-84G Thunderjet being loaded with ordnance at Luanda Air Base, 1960s.

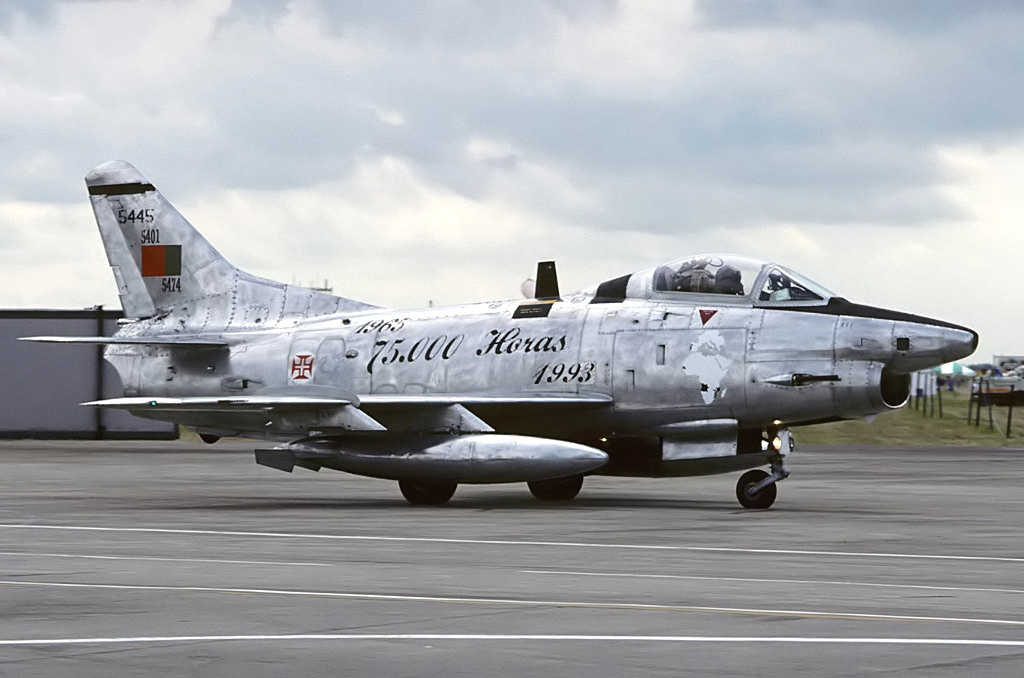
Portuguese Fiat G.91 fighter-bomber, deployed by the Portuguese Air Force in the theatres of Guinea-Bissau and Mozambique.

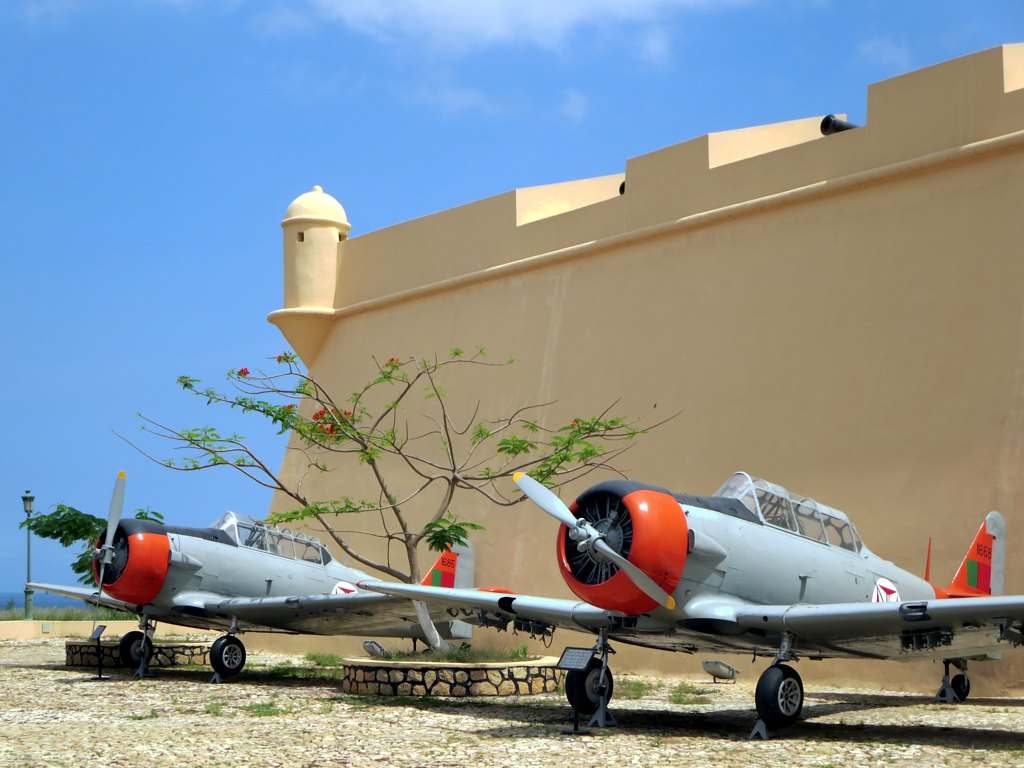
Two former Portuguese North American T-6G Texan trainers now on display at the National Museum of Military History in Luanda, Angola, 2015.

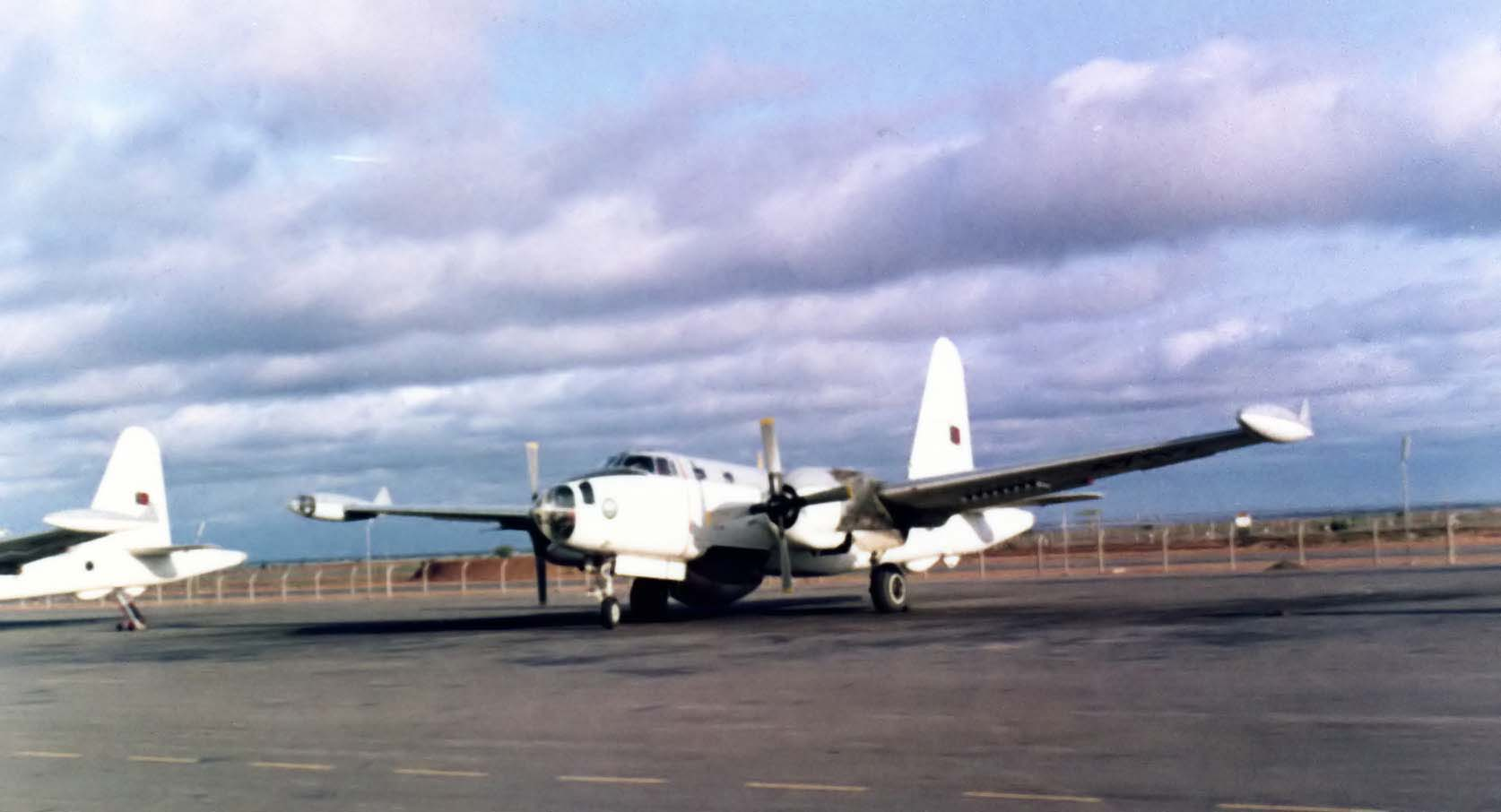
Two Lockheed PV-2C Harpoons of the Portuguese Air Force, 1970s.

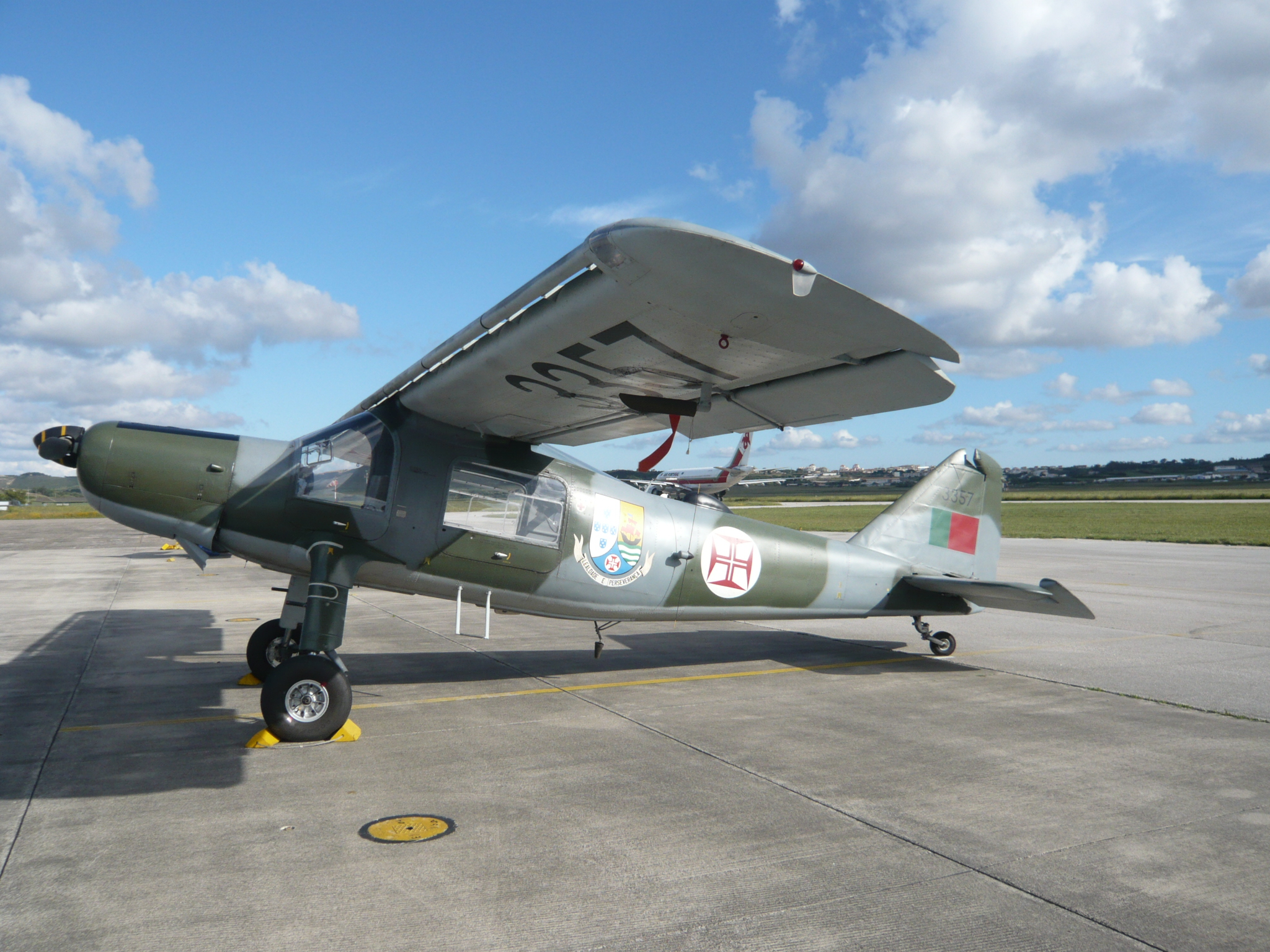
Portuguese Air Force Dornier Do 27.

- Republic F-84G Thunderjet Fighter-bomber: employed early in the War on ground-attack and close air support operations.
- North American F-86G/F-86F Sabre Fighter aircraft: employed early in the War on ground attack and close air support operations.
- Fiat G.91 R/4 Fighter-bomber: employed in reconnaissance, ground attack and close air support operations.
- Lockheed PV-2C Harpoon Patrol bomber: employed mainly as a light bomber and ground attack aircraft, with occasional reconnaissance, transport and maritime patrol sorties in Angola and Mozambique.
- Lockheed P2V-5 Neptune maritime patrol and anti-submarine warfare (ASW) aircraft: employed in Guinea-Bissau, Angola and Mozambique.
- Douglas B-26B/B-26C Invader light bomber: employed in ground attack and close air support operations.
- North American T-6G Texan trainer aircraft/Fighter-bomber: employed in ground attack and close air support operations.
- Dornier Do 27 K1/K2 STOL light utility aircraft: employed in reconnaissance, casualty evacuation, ground attack and close air support operations.
- Cessna 185A Skywagon light utility aircraft
- Max Holste MH.1521 Broussard utility monoplane: employed in reconnaissance operations.
- Auster AOP.9 military air observation aircraft: employed in reconnaissance operations.
- Junkers Ju 52 military transport aircraft
- Douglas C-47A Dakota military transport aircraft
- Nord Noratlas N-2502F/N-2501D military transport aircraft
- Douglas C-54A, C-54D and HC-54D Skymaster military transport aircraft
- Douglas DC-6 Airliner/transport aircraft
- Boeing 707-3 F5 Airliner

=== Naval and River craft ===
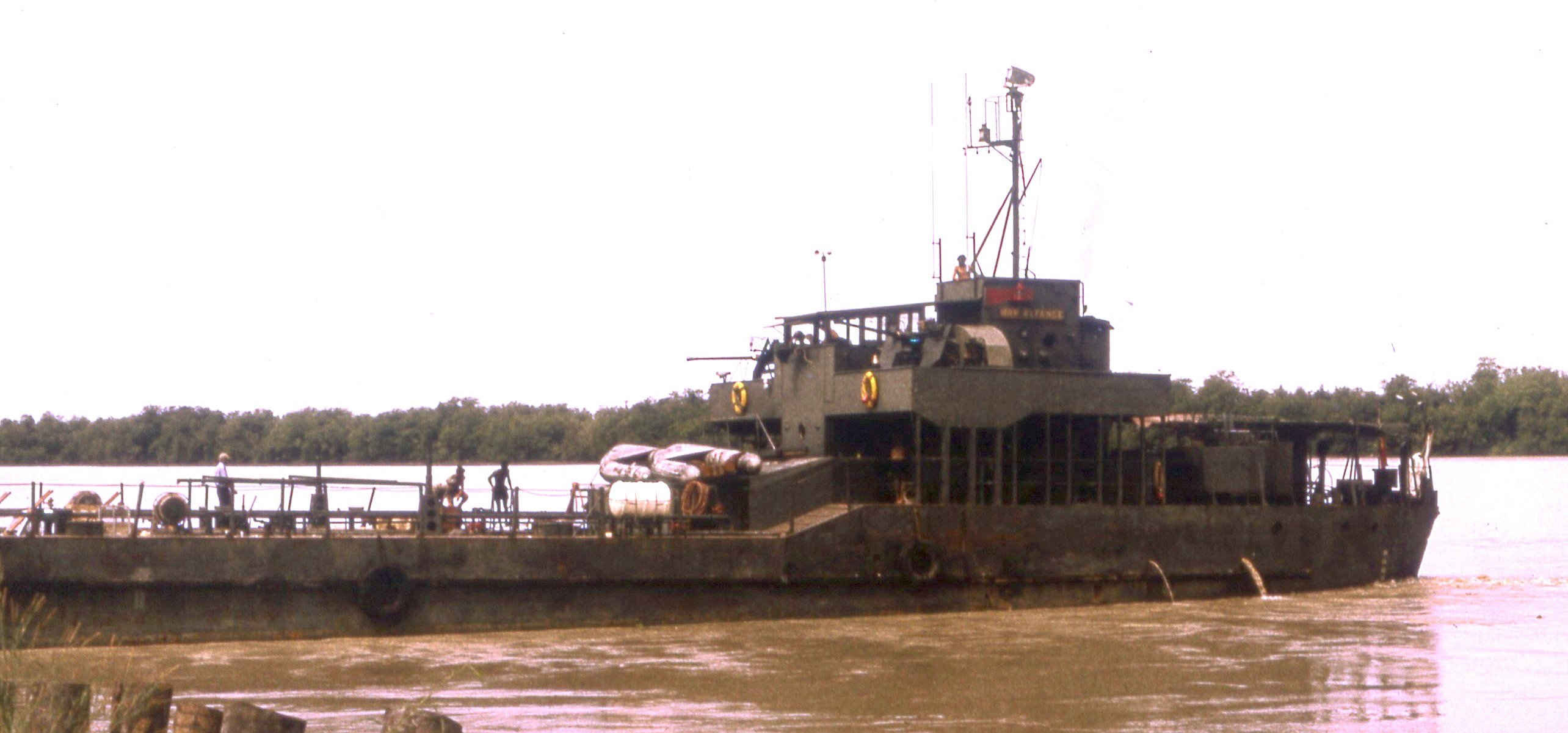
The large landing craft NRP Alfange supplying the garrison of Bambadinca, Portuguese Guinea, 1973.

- Cacine-class patrol boat
- João Coutinho-class corvette
- Admiral Pereira da Silva-class frigate
- João Belo-class frigate
- Douro-class destroyer
- Minesweeper
- Large surveillance launch (LFG)
- Landing craft
- Landing Craft Utility (LCU)
- Large landing craft (LDG)
- Landing craft tank (LST)
- Troop transport ship
- Berrio-class fleet tanker
- Zebro III rubber inflatable boat: used by the Portuguese Navy and the Portuguese Marine Corps.

== African Liberation Movements equipment ==
=== Pistols ===
- Tokarev TT-33
- Type 54 pistol (Chinese copy of the Soviet Tokarev TT-33)
- Makarov PM
- Stechkin automatic pistol: used mainly in Angola.

=== Submachine guns ===
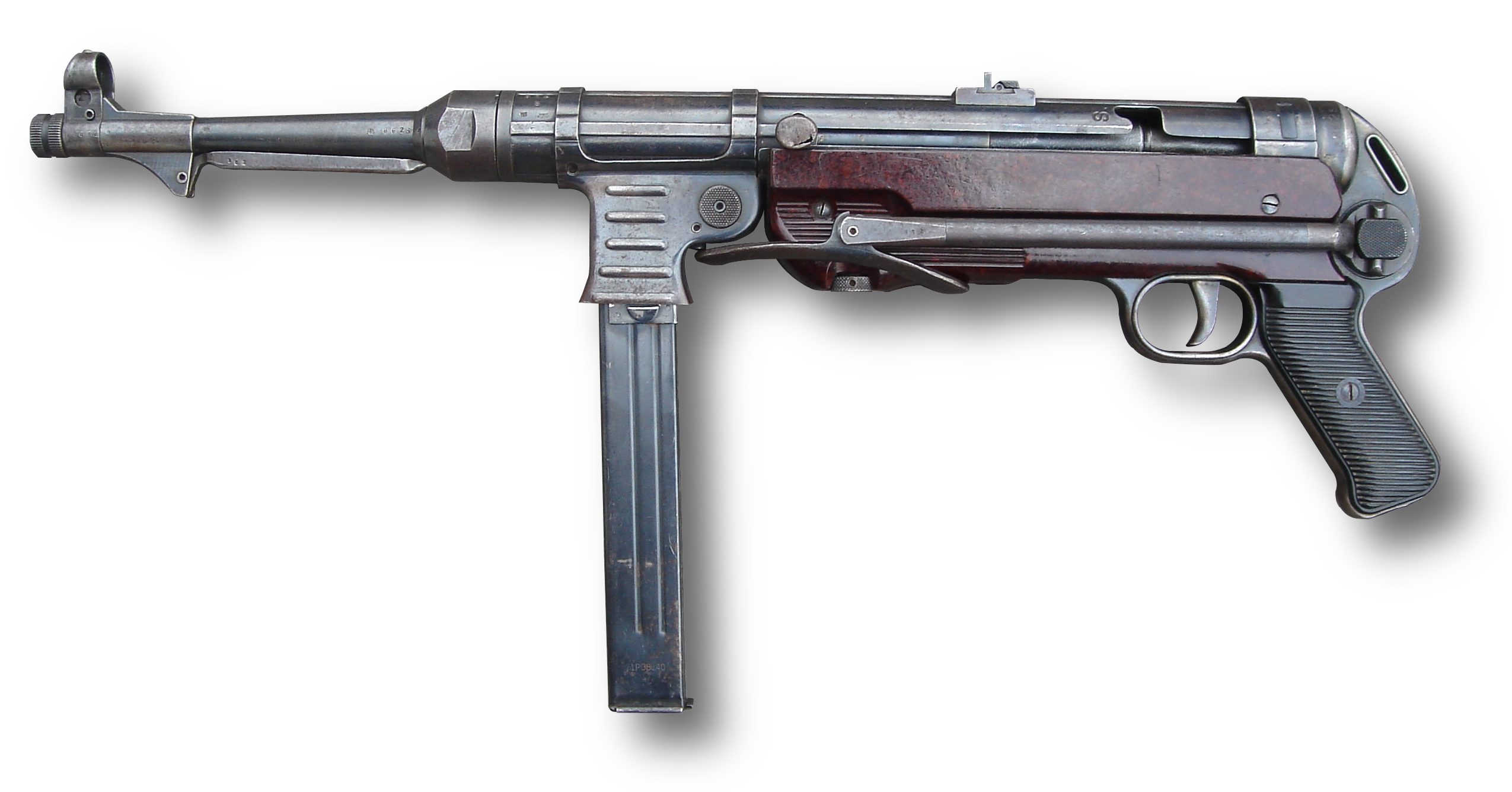
MP 40 Submachine gun

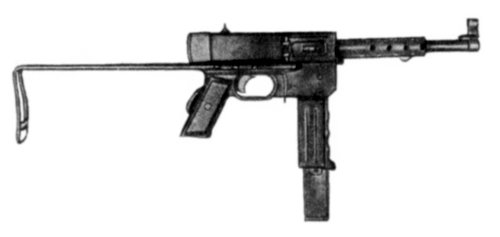
MAT-49 Submachine gun

- Steyr-Solothurn S1-100 (MP 34)
- Bergmann MP39 (Swedish version of the German Bergmann MP35)
- MP 40
- Beretta M38/44
- M1928A1 Thompson
- MAT-49
- Sten Mark II
- Vigneron submachine gun
- Franchi LF-57: Captured.
- Star Model Z-45: Captured.
- Sterling submachine gun
- PPSh-41
- PPS-43
- Sa 25

=== Bolt-action rifles ===
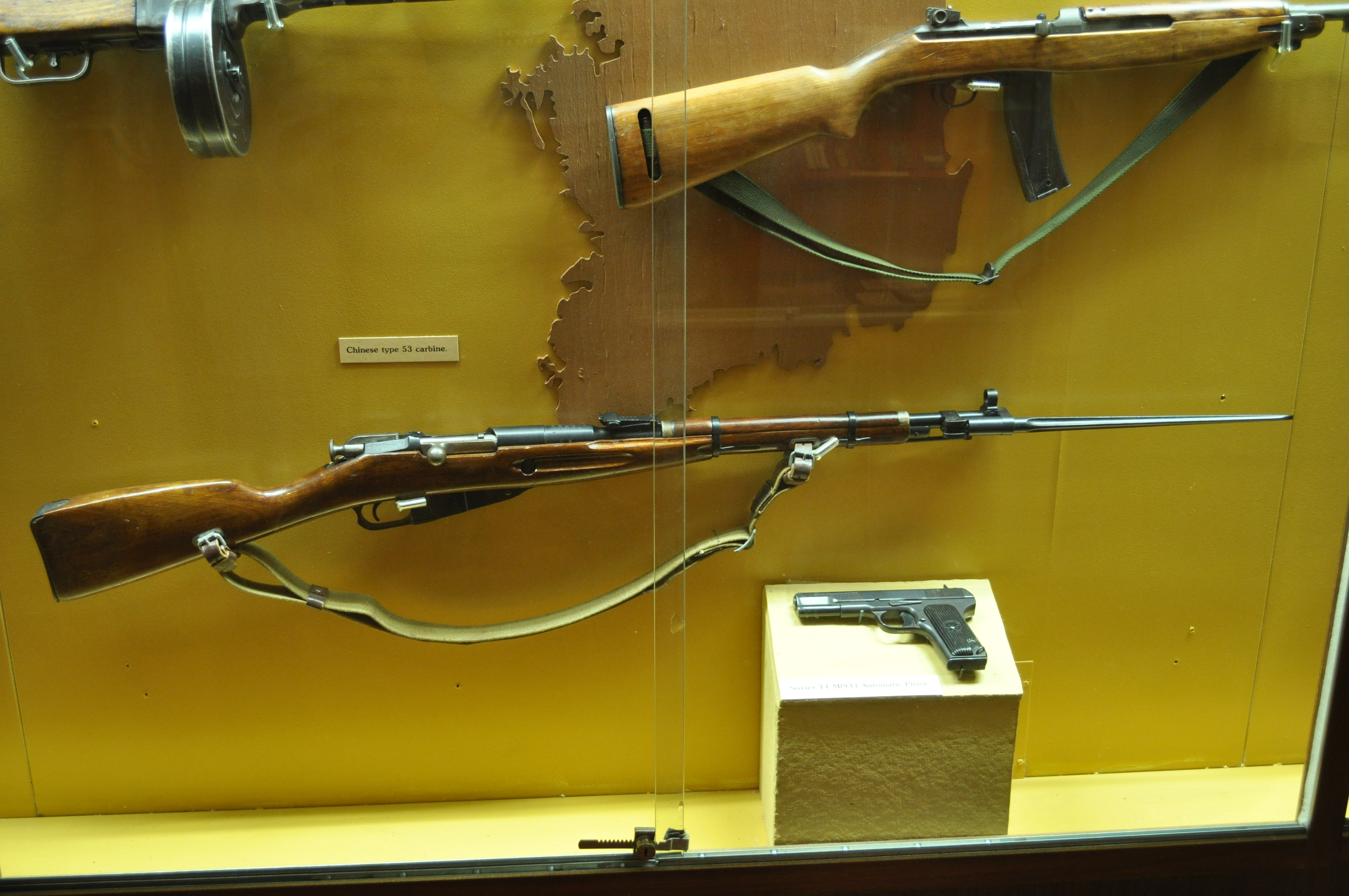
Chinese Type 53 carbine.

- Mauser–Vergueiro: Captured.
- Espingarda 7,92 mm m/937 Mauser infantry rifle: Captured.
- Mauser Karabiner 98k
- Fusil Gras: limited use early in the War in Angola, likely acquired from Belgian Congo.
- FN Mle 24/30 (a.k.a. Mle 50) .30-06 cal. Mauser carbine: used early in the War in Angola, acquired from Belgian Congo.
- Steyr Model 1912 Mauser
- Lee–Enfield SMLE Mk III
- Pattern 1914 Enfield
- MAS-36 rifle: used early in the War in both Guinea-Bissau and Mozambique.
- Type 53 carbine (Chinese copy of the Soviet Mosin–Nagant M1944 carbine)

=== Semi-automatic rifles ===
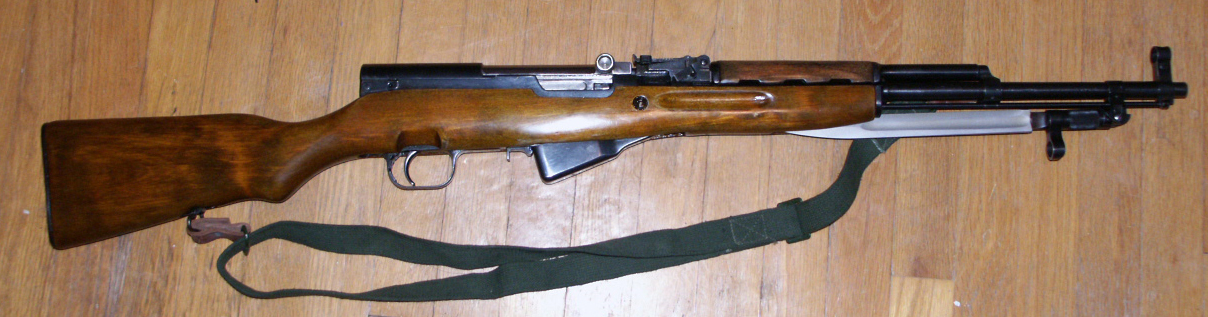
SKS semi-automatic rifles were used by the guerrillas before the full introduction of AK-47 and AKM assault rifles.

- SKS
- Type 56 semi-automatic carbine (Chinese copy of the Soviet SKS)
- vz. 52 rifle: used late in the War in Guinea-Bissau and Angola.

=== Assault rifles ===
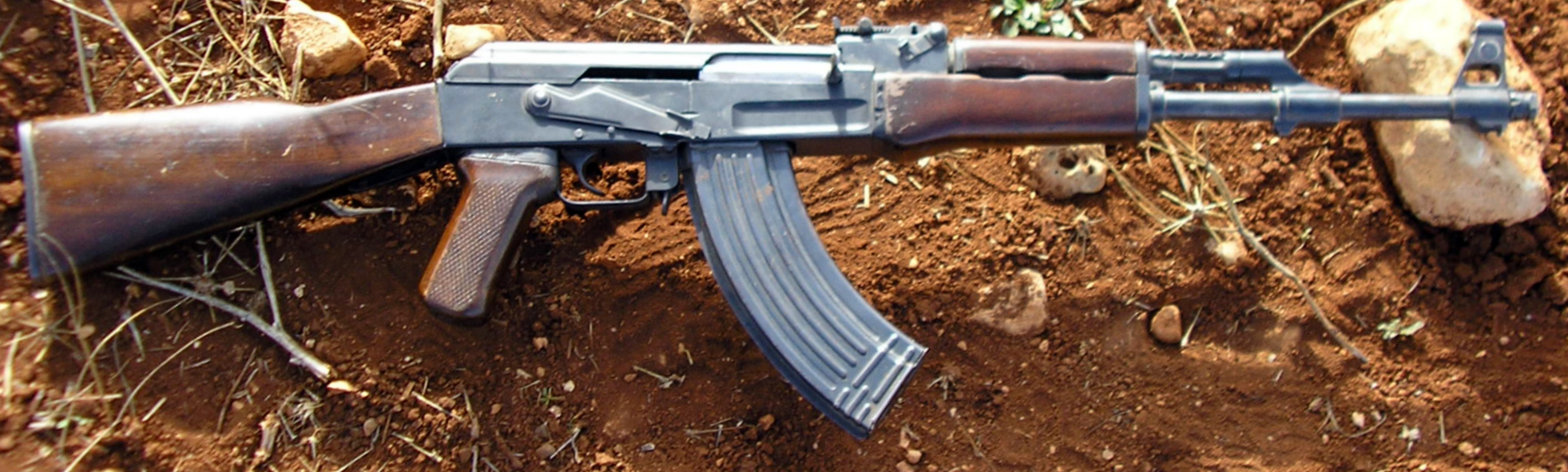
AK-47 assault rifle, widely used by the African guerrilla movements.

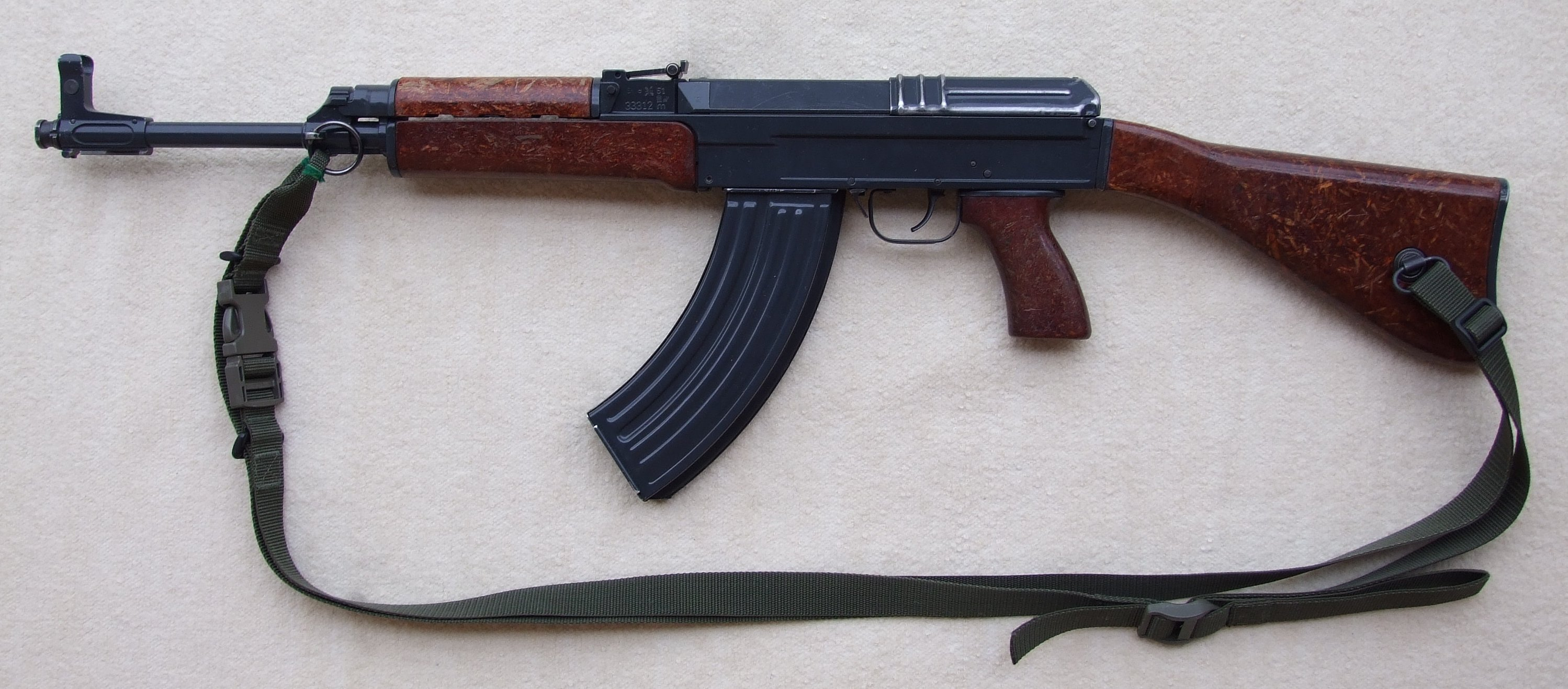
Sa vz. 58 assault rifle.

- AK-47 assault rifle (other variants included the AKS, the AKM and AKMS, the Chinese Type 56 and Type 56-1, the Romanian Pistol Mitralieră model 1963/1965, and former East German MPi-KM and MPi-KMS-72 assault rifles)
- Sa vz. 58

=== Battle rifles ===
- FN FAL: Captured.
- Heckler & Koch G3: Captured.

=== Sniper rifles ===
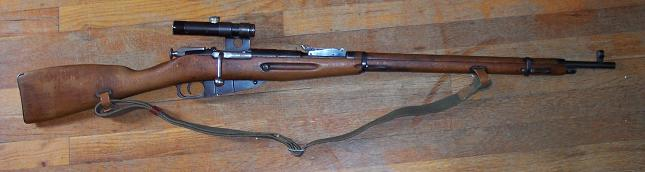
Hungarian M/52 rifle with PU 3.5× optics

- M/52 (Hungarian copy of the Soviet Mosin–Nagant Model 1891/30 sniper rifle)

=== Shotguns ===
- Canhangulo (home-made shotgun): employed early in the War in both Angola and Mozambique.

=== Light machine guns ===
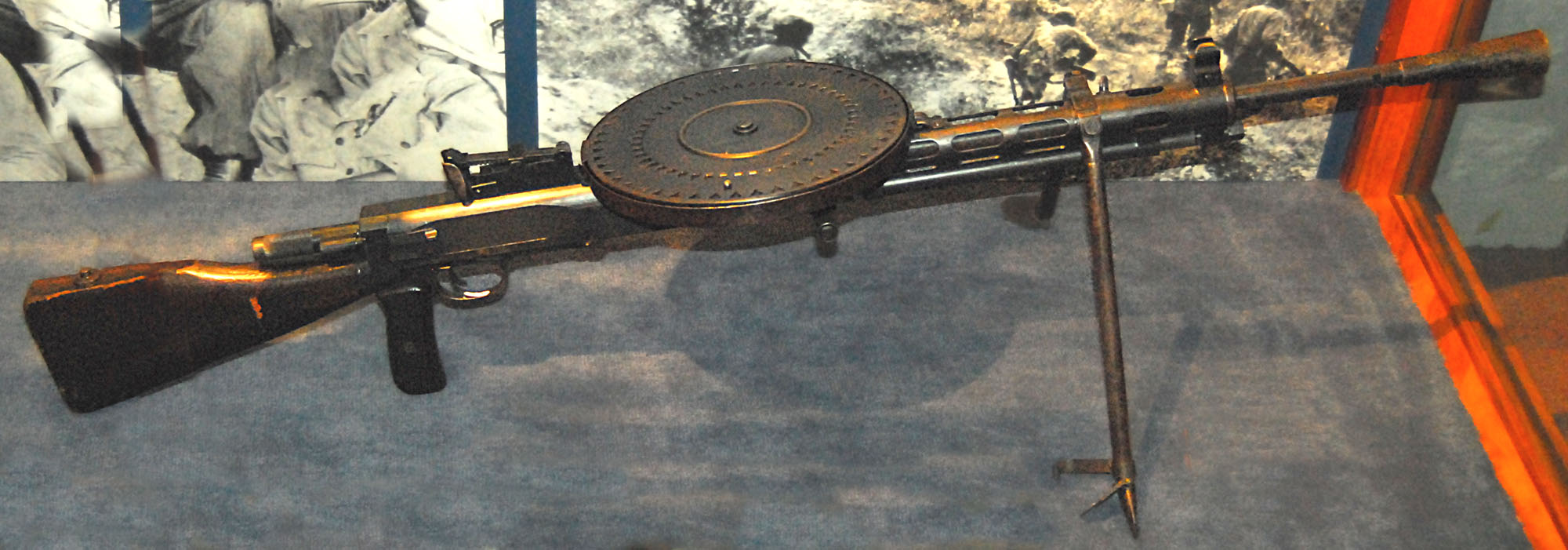
Chinese Type 53 light machine gun

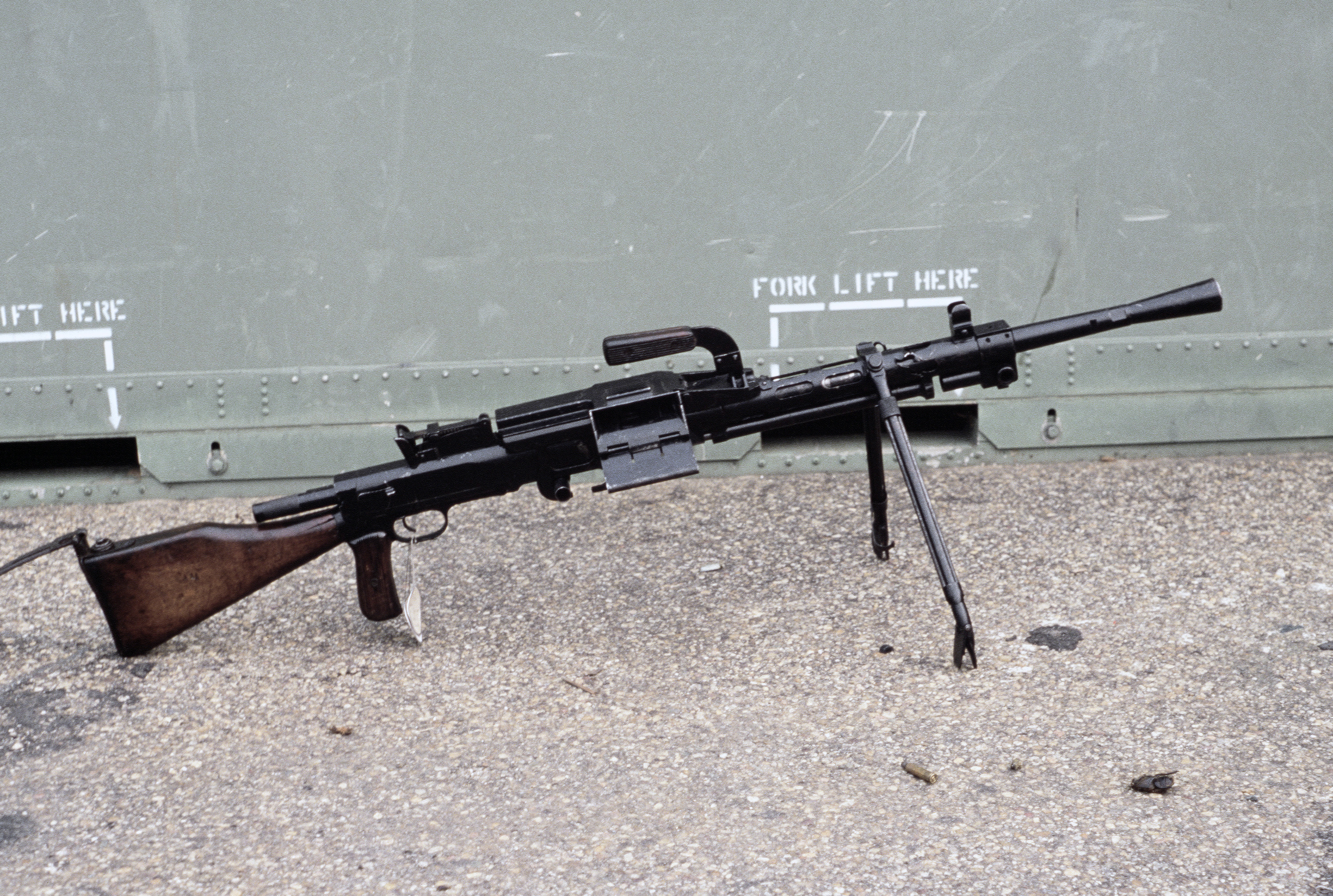
RP-46 light machine gun

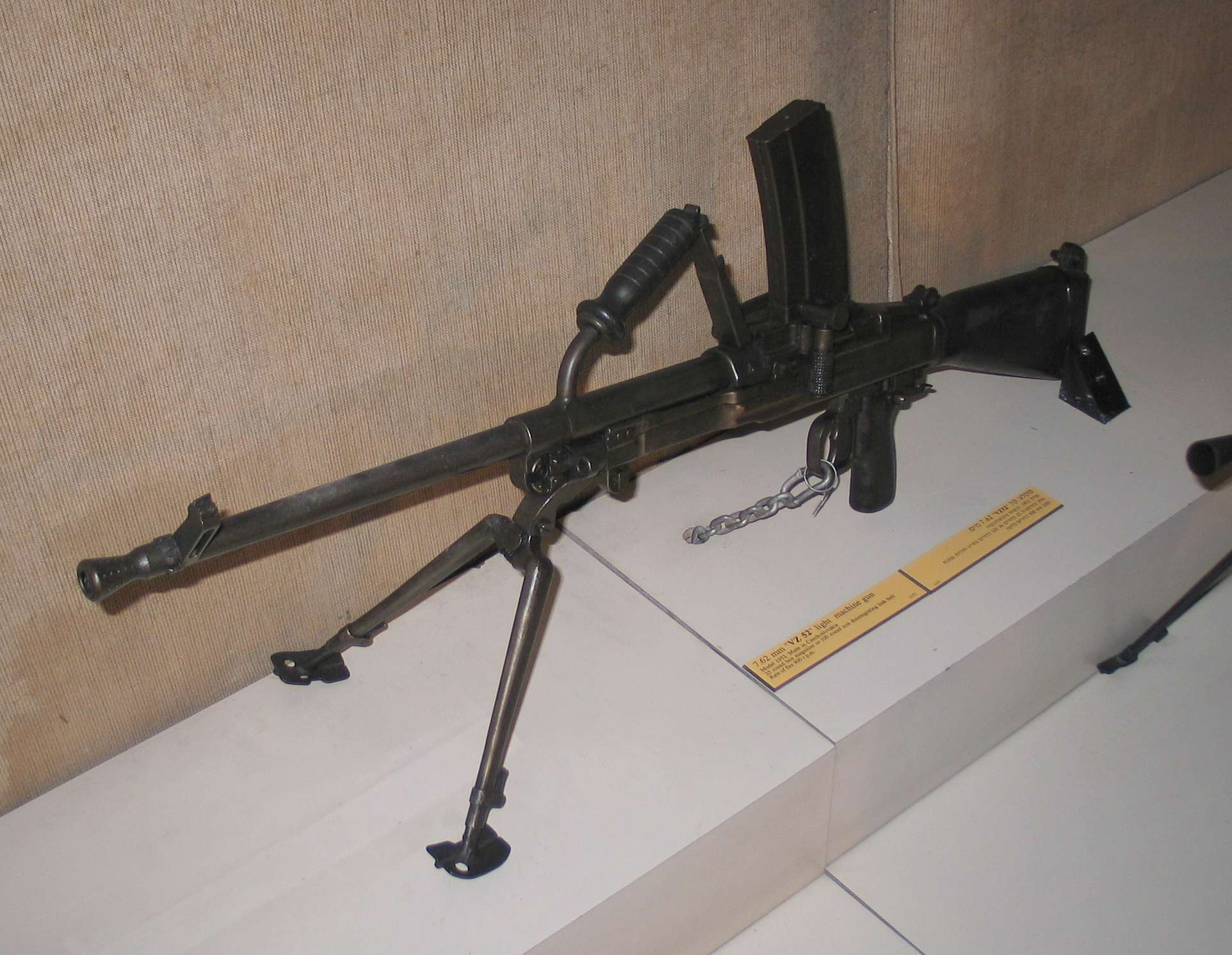
Vz. 52 machine gun

- Madsen machine gun
- FM 24/29 light machine gun: used mainly in Guinea-Bissau.
- Bren Mk. I .303 (7.7mm)
- Breda 30
- Degtyaryov DP/DPM
- Type 53 light machine gun (Chinese copy of the Degtyaryov DP/DPM)
- RP-46: variant of the Degtyaryov DP/DPM used mainly in Angola.
- RPD machine gun
- Type 56 light machine gun (Chinese copy of the RPD)
- RPK
- Vz. 52 machine gun

=== General-purpose machine guns ===
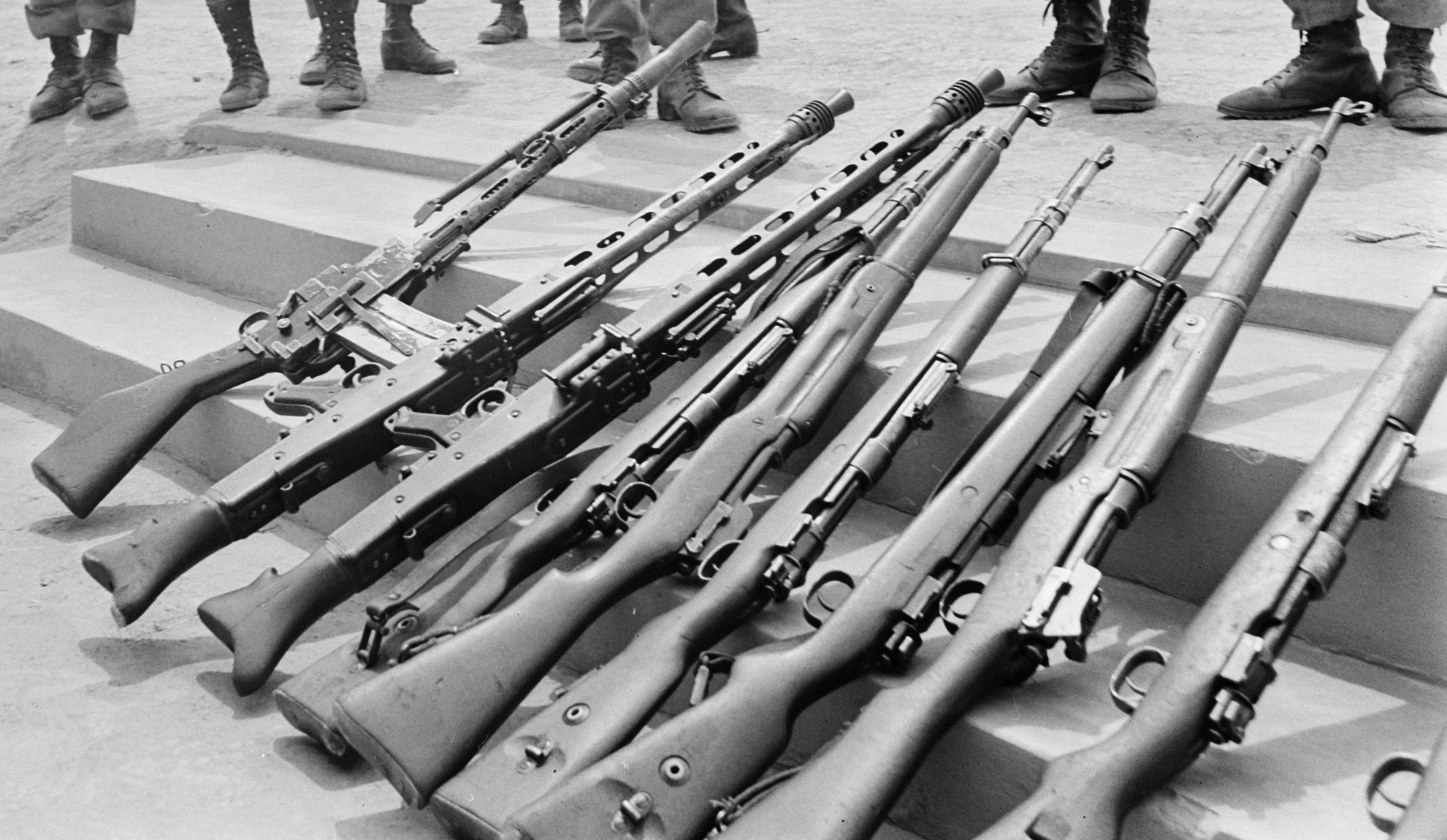
MG 42s (second and third from left) in a training camp of the FNLA, in Zaire, 1973, along with a Madsen machine gun and several Karabiner 98ks and Pattern 1914 Enfields.

- MG 34
- MG 42
- Metralhadora 7,62 mm m/962 MG42 (MG 42/59 variant): Captured.
- UK vz. 59
- PK machine gun: used late in the War.

=== Medium and Heavy machine guns ===
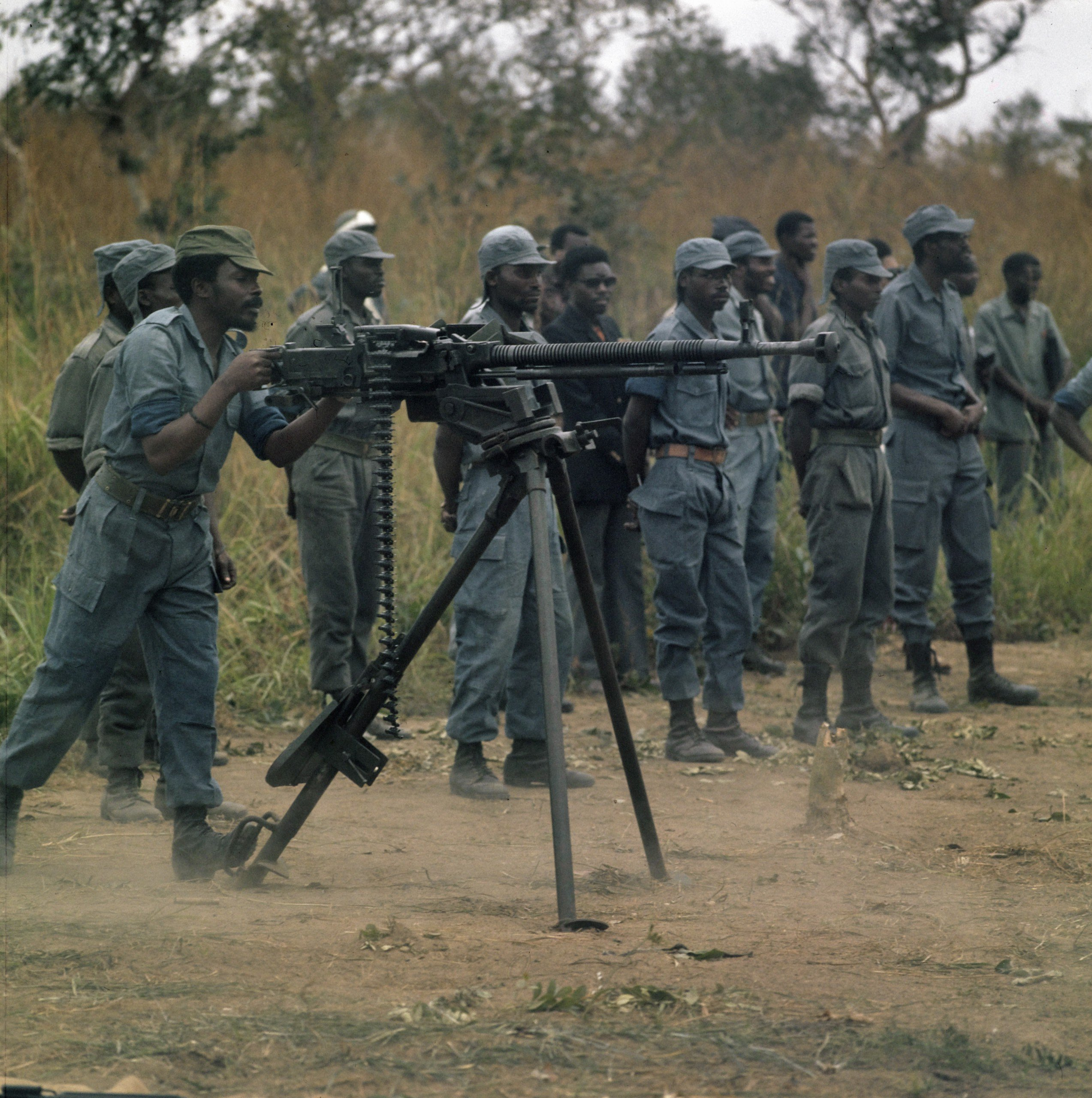
FNLA soldiers undergoing training with a DShKM 12.7mm Heavy machine gun at a base camp in Zaire, 22 August 1973.

- ZB-53 medium machine gun: employed in both air defense and direct fire supporting roles, mainly in Guinea-Bissau.
- SG-43/SGM Goryunov medium machine gun: employed in both air defense and direct fire supporting roles.
- Type 53/57 medium machine gun (Chinese copies of the SG-43 and SGM): employed in both air defense and direct fire supporting roles.
- DShKM 12.7mm Heavy machine gun: employed in both air defense and direct fire supporting roles.
- Type 54 Heavy machine gun (Chinese copy of the DShKM): employed in both air defense and direct fire supporting roles.

=== Grenade systems ===
- F-1 hand grenade
- Type 1 hand Grenade (Chinese copy of the Soviet F1 grenade)
- RG-42 fragmentation-type hand grenade
- RGD-5 hand grenade
- Type 59 hand grenade (Chinese copy of the Soviet RGD-5 grenade)
- RG-4 anti-personnel grenade

=== Land mine systems ===
- PMN-2/2M anti-personnel mine (nicknamed the "Black Widow" by the Portuguese)
- POMZ-2 anti-personnel mine
- PMD-6/6M anti-personnel wood box mine
- TMD-44 wood box blast anti-tank mine
- TMD-B wood box blast anti-tank mine
- TMA-1 blast anti-tank mine
- TM-46 blast anti-tank mine
- TM-57 blast anti-tank mine
- PRB M3 blast anti-tank mine (a.k.a. the "Encrier")
- PDM amphibious mine: used mainly in Guinea-Bissau.

=== Bombs and explosives ===
- Improvised explosive devices (nicknamed "fornilhos" by the Portuguese): IEDs made of hand grenades or unexploded ordnance bounded together, triggered by an electric detonator or a pyrotechnic delay fuse.
- TNT explosive charge

=== Rocket and missile systems ===
- DKB Grad-P 122mm Light portable rocket system
- SA-7 Grail surface-to-air missile: used late in the War in Guinea-Bissau and Mozambique.

=== Anti-tank rockets and Grenade launchers ===
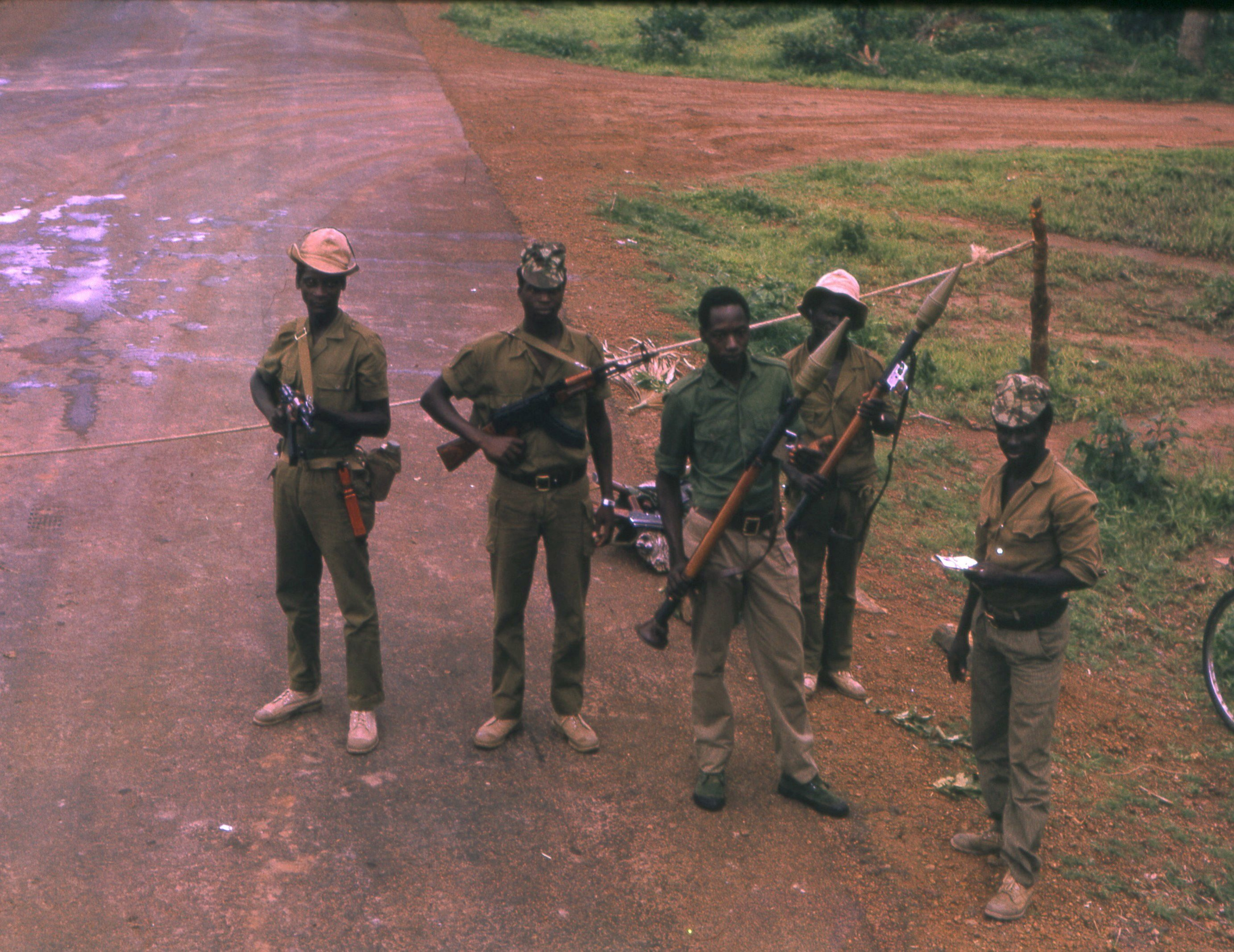
PAIGC guerrillas armed with AKMs and Type 69 RPGs manning a checkpoint in Guinea-Bissau, 1974.

- RPG-2 rocket-propelled grenade launcher
- Type 56 rocket-propelled grenade launcher (Chinese copy of the Soviet RPG-2)
- P-27 Pancéřovka (Czechoslovak-produced rocket-propelled grenade launcher similar to the Soviet RPG-2)
- RPG-7 rocket-propelled grenade launcher
- Type 69 RPG (Chinese version of the Soviet RPG-7)
- Lança-granadas-foguete M-20 8,9 mm m/952 (US M20 "Super Bazooka" 3.5-inch): Captured.

=== Recoilless rifles ===
- Type 56 75mm (Chinese copy of the US M20 recoilless rifle)
- B-10 82mm
- SPG-82 82mm
- T-21 Trasnice 82mm (Czechoslovak-produced recoilless rifle)
- M-40 105mm: limited use very late in the War by FNLA guerrillas in Angola.

=== Mortars ===
- Type 31 and Type 63 60mm mortars (Chinese versions of the US M2 60mm infantry mortar)
- Type 53 82mm mortar (Chinese copy of the Soviet 82-PM-37 82 mm mortar)
- 82-PM-41 82mm mortar
- 120-PM-43 (M-1943) 120mm heavy mortar

=== Howitzers ===
- M1938 (M-30) 122 mm field howitzer: limited use late in the War mainly in Guinea-Bissau.
- M1954 (M-46) 130 mm towed field gun: limited use late in the War mainly in Guinea-Bissau.

=== Anti-tank guns ===
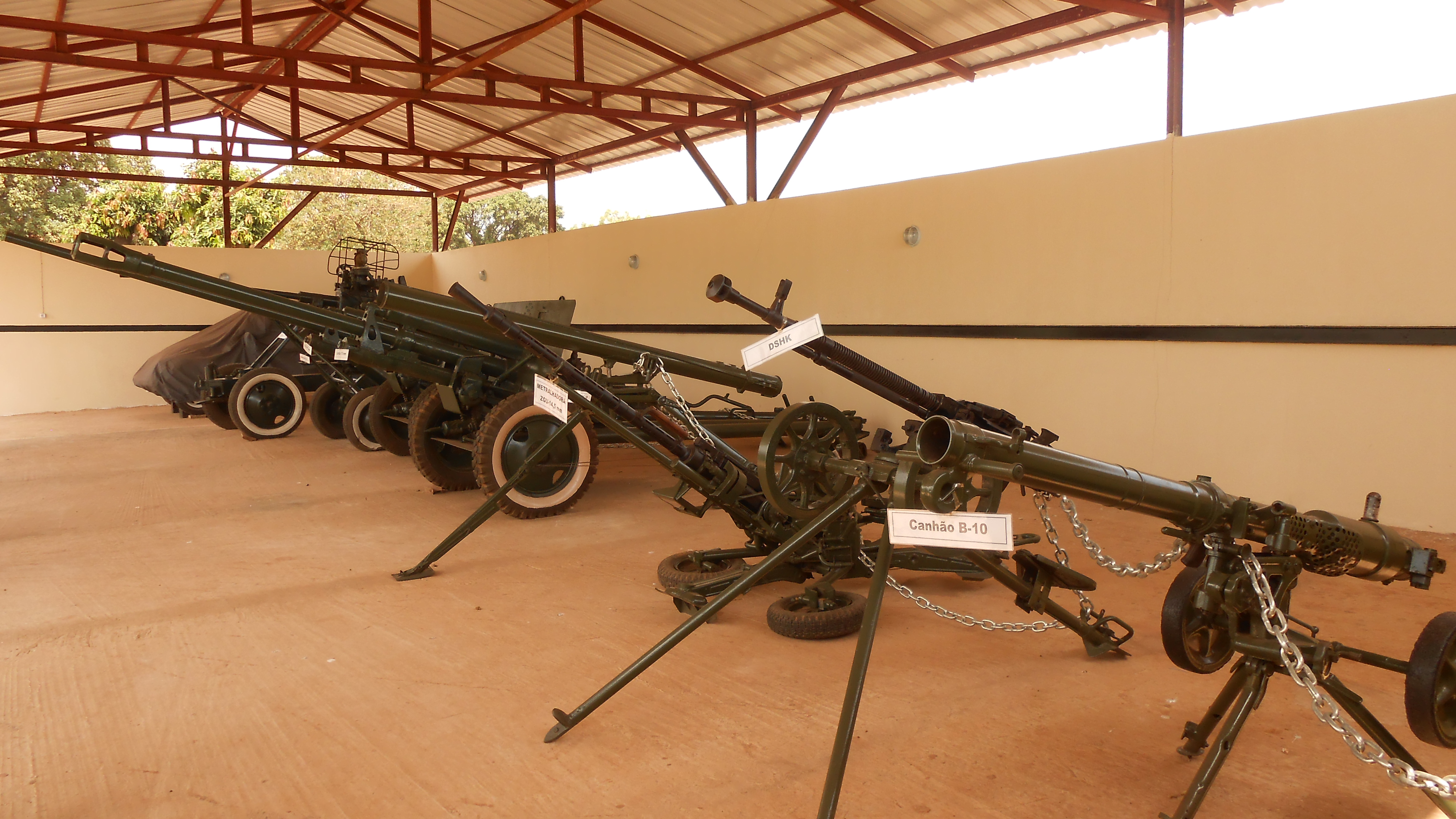
Heavy equipment used by the PAIGC, including two ZiS-2 and ZiS-3 anti-tank guns, a DShKM Heavy machine gun and a B-10 recoilless rifle, now on display at Bissau.

- ZiS-2 57mm anti-tank gun: used mainly in Guinea-Bissau.
- ZiS-3 76.2mm anti-tank gun: used mainly in Guinea-Bissau.
- D-44 85mm anti-tank gun: limited use mainly in Guinea-Bissau.

=== Anti-aircraft guns and Autocannons ===
- ZPU-1 14.5mm AA autocannon: employed in both air defense and direct fire supporting roles.
- ZPU-2 14.5mm AA autocannon: employed in both air defense and direct fire supporting roles.
- ZPU-4 14.5mm Quadruple AA autocannon: used mainly in Guinea-Bissau.
- M1939 (61-K) 37mm anti-aircraft gun: used mainly in Guinea-Bissau.

=== Armoured vehicles ===
- BRDM-1 amphibious armoured scout car: limited use mainly in Guinea-Bissau.
- BRDM-2 amphibious armoured scout car: limited use mainly in Guinea-Bissau.
- PT-76 amphibious light tank: limited use mainly in Guinea-Bissau.
- T-34/85 medium tank: limited use mainly in Guinea-Bissau.
- BTR-40 Armoured Personnel Carrier: limited use mainly in Guinea-Bissau.
- BTR-152 Armoured Personnel Carrier: limited use mainly in Guinea-Bissau.
- BTR-60 Armoured Personnel Carrier: limited use mainly in Guinea-Bissau.
- Panhard AML-60 armoured car: two vehicles employed very late in the War by the FLEC in Cabinda, likely acquired from Zaire.
- Panhard M3 VTT armoured personnel carrier: one captured vehicle employed very late in the War by the FNLA in Angola.

=== Transport vehicles ===
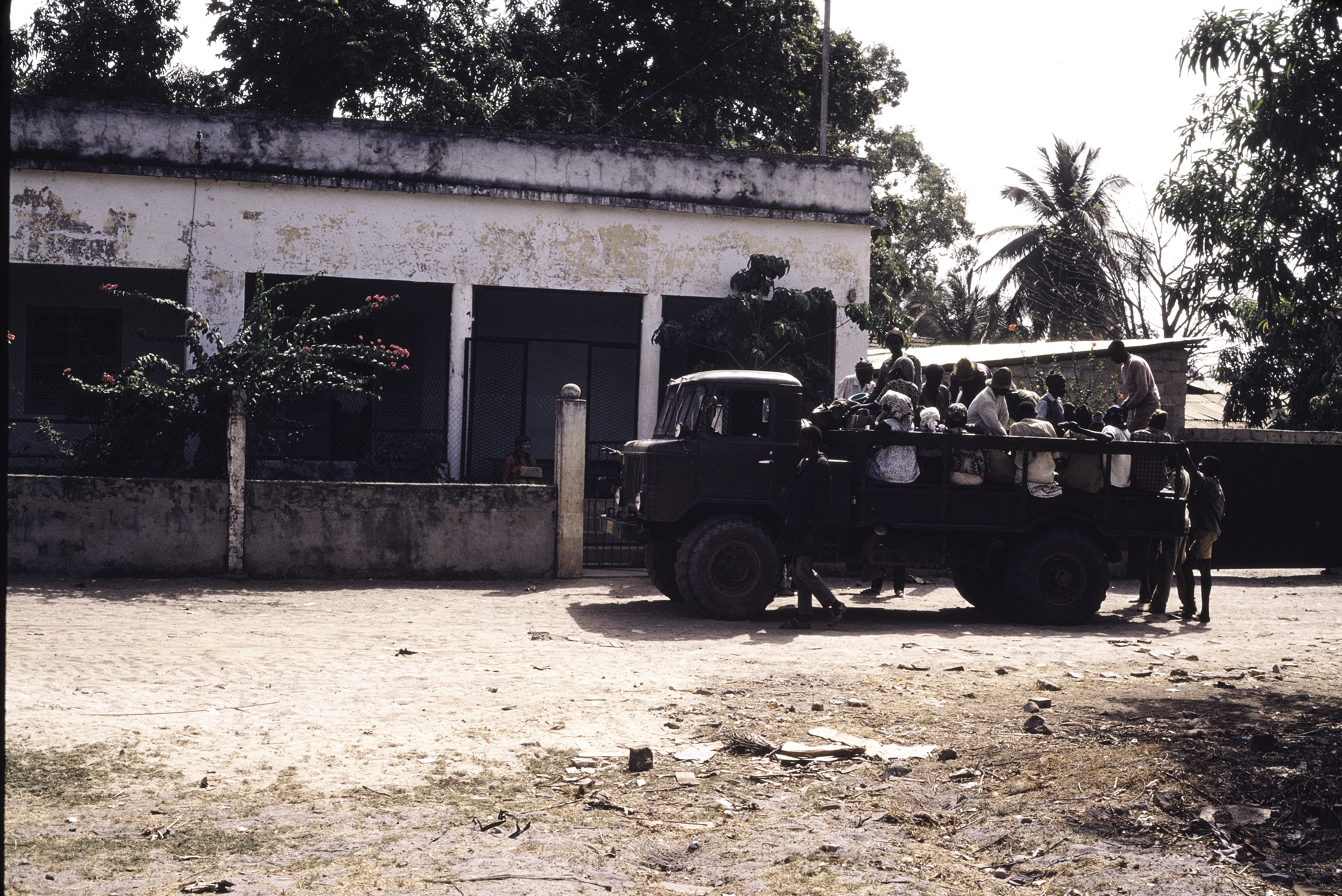
GAZ-66 light truck in military service with the PAIGC liberation movement in Guinea-Bissau, 1973.

- GAZ-69A (4×4) field car
- GAZ-66 light truck

=== Aircraft ===
- Mikoyan-Gurevich MiG-15 Jet Fighter aircraft: limited use as a fighter-bomber very late in the War in Guinea-Bissau.
- Mikoyan-Gurevich MiG-17 Jet Fighter aircraft: limited use as a fighter-bomber very late in the War in Guinea-Bissau.
- Ilyushin Il-14 Airliner/transport aircraft: limited use as a light bomber in Guinea-Bissau.

=== Naval and River craft ===
- P 6-class torpedo boat: limited use late in the War in Guinea-Bissau.
- Dugout canoe

== See also ==
- Angolan Civil War
- Angolan War of Independence
- Decolonisation of Africa
- Guinea-Bissau War of Independence
- List of weapons of the Rhodesian Bush War
- Military history of Africa
- Mozambican Civil War
- Mozambican War of Independence
- Portuguese Colonial War
- Rhodesian Bush War
- Rhodesian Security Forces
- South African Border War
- Sud Aviation Alouette III in Portuguese service
