= TMA-1 =

TMA-1 may refer to:

- TMA-1 mine, a circular, plastic-cased Yugoslavian minimum metal anti-tank blast mine
- Soyuz TMA-1, a Russian space exploration mission
- TMA-1 (Tycho Magnetic Anomaly - 1), the fictional Monolith (Space Odyssey) found in the moon's Tycho Crater in the novel and film 2001: A Space Odyssey
- 3,4,5-Trimethoxyamphetamine (TMA or TMA-1), a psychedelic drug
