= Poudreries Réunies de Belgique =

Belgium's former, large manufacturer of munitions

Poudreries Réunies de Belgique SA
- Industry: Mines, Chemicals, Explosives
- Founded: 1896
- Defunct: 1990
- Fate: Bankrupt
- Headquarters: Belgium

Poudreries Réunies de Belgique SA (or PRB) was one of Belgium's oldest and largest manufacturers of munitions, once the second-largest Belgian armaments manufacturer. The company indirectly started in 1778 in Wetteren as a gunpowder factory. By its 200th anniversary in 1979 it had 73 factories throughout the world, with the headquarters in Brussels.

PRB finally became bankrupt in 1993 after being demilitarised in 1990 with parts sold to the Luchaire Defense SA, part of Giat Industries (now known as AFAIR Société Nouvelle PRB SA)

== History ==
The history of PRB revolves around its production sites in Belgium. Production was located in 6 sites, Matagne, Clermont, Vivegnis (Wallonia), Mechelen, Kaulille and Balen, with mine related production at Matagne (components), Kaulille (explosives) and Balen (filling).

- 1778, Jan-Frans Cooppal established a gunpowder factory at Wetteren.
- 1796, Wetteren factory closed by French.
- 1815, Wetteren factory restarted after Battle of Waterloo.
- 1850, Clermont site founded by Hilgers and Cie Company
- 1872, Clermont site owned by Muller Company
- 1880, Explosion at Wetteren
- 1881, Balen site started by La Forcite N.V.
- 1881-83, new plant to be built at Kaulille.
- 1896, Poudrerie Réunies de Casteau formed
- 1898, Ether production started at Wetteren
- 1919, Poudrerie Réunies de Casteau change name to Poudreries Réunies de Belgique
- 1919, Clermont site bought by Poudreries Réunies de Belgique
- 1920, Balen site bought by Poudreries Réunies de Belgique
- 1952, polyurethane foam produced at Wetteren
- 1966, Joint venture between Cooppal and PRB called Eurofoam
- 1969, Poudreries Réunies de Belgique renamed to PRB
- 1985, Gechem formed by majority shareholder of PRB - SGB
- 1988, Gechem Group decided to sell PRB
- 1989, PRB sold to Astra Holdings
- 1989, PRB put into bankruptcy by Astra
- 1990, Clermont renamed to PB-Clermont and sold to SNPE Group
- 1992, Astra Holdings goes into bankruptcy
- 1993, PRB bankruptcy complete.

=== Wetteren and Kaulille ===
In 1778 Jan-Frans Cooppal established a gunpowder factory at Wetteren (Belgium) called Koninklijke Buskruitfabriek Cooppal. This was closed by the French on July 31, 1796 but after the Battle of Waterloo production was restarted in 1815.

Following a catastrophic explosion in 1880, it was decided to build a new plant at Kaulille (Belgium). In 1881 the company changed its name to NV Cooppal en Co.

On 19 June 1896 at Casteau (Belgium), the Poudrerie Réunies de Casteau was established, for the production of gunpowder and explosives.

Ether production is started in 1898 at Cooppal in Wetteren and in 1919 the Poudrerie Réunies de Casteau change their name to Poudreries Réunies de Belgique (PRB).

Between the two world wars the sites started production of synthetic and natural resins as used in paint and varnish. In 1952 the Wetteren site, under license from Bayer produces polyurethane foam (PU), and so reducing reliance on the production of gunpowder and ether.

In 1966 PRB and Cooppal create a 50:50 joint venture Eurofoam, focusing on polyurethane and throughout the 1970s PRB develops its chemical industry interests.

Recticel, a small Dutch company in the PU business and part of the PRB group takes over all the polyurethane related activities of PRB.

In 1985, Société Générale de Belgique (SGB), then the majority shareholder of PRB, grouped its activities in the chemical sector in a new company, Gechem of which Recticel is one of them but by 1992 Recticel remained the only activity of the Gechem group.

(Recticel was finally acquired by a holding company, with Cie du Bois Sauvage from Société Générale de Belgique in 1998).

In 1985-1986 Société Générale de Belgique (SGB) pooled the activities of PRB into a new company, GECHEM Group and in 1988 SGB injected new capital, increasing its ownership from 80% to 90% in the group.

In 1988 GECHEM Group decided to sell PRB and in 1989 sold it to Astra Holdings with the Forges de Zeebrugge subsidiary being sold to Thomson Brandt (now Thales Group).

=== Clermont ===
The Clermont site was initially started by Hilgers and Cie Company in 1850, then Muller Company in 1872, before Poudreries Réunies de Belgique acquired the site in 1919 (known as PRB from 1969). The site was changed to PB-Clermont, part of the SNPE Group in 1990 now part of the European Energetics Corporation (Eurenco).

=== Balen ===
In 1881 La Forcite N.V. was established near Balen and this was later acquired in 1920 by PRB. The site was used for the production of dynamite but after the second world war, other products, mainly agricultural, were produced. The site is now run by Ajinomoto OmniChem.

=== Bankruptcy ===
Astra discovered problems with PRB finances and argued with SGB (Société Générale de Belgique). Astra refused to invest more capital in PRB and the company declared PRB bankrupt in 1989. The different branches were put into liquidation and the bankruptcy was completed on 27 December 1993 (by which time in February 1992 Astra Holdings had itself gone into receivership).

The Matagne site was sold in 1990 to Mecar SA (then part of Allied Research Corporation USA, later part of the Chemring Group PLC and now part of the Nexter Group) and was demilitarized immediately in 1990 with the explosive materials being recovered by SNPE. The site was returned to civilian use.

The Clermont site was sold to SNPE. The Kaulille site was sold to Kaulindus and demilitarized. The Balen site was demilitarized and is now part of OmniChem.

== Involvement in Project Babylon ==
In the 1980s PRB collaborated with Gerald Bull's Space Research Corporation on artillery projectile production, founding a joint company in Belgium. In December 1989 the British Secret Intelligence Service obtained evidence that PRB had supplied propellant charges for the Iraqi Project Babylon supergun. This was shipped using falsified Jordanian end-user licenses.

== Products ==
=== Mines ===
- PRB BAC H28, anti-personal blast mine (precursor to NR 409),
- NR 408 3.3kilo charge replaced the M3. Height: 98mm, diameter: 215mm.
- NR 409 also known as PRB M409, Anti Personnel blast mine Diameter : 82mm. Weight : 183gram, including 80gram Trialene
- NR 413, fragmentation AP mine triggered by trip wires 95 grams composition B Height: 213mm, diameter: 46mm. Weight: 640gram Removable fragmentation coil.
- NR 442, bounding fragmentation antipersonnel mine functions exactly like the WW2 German S-Mine44. 560gram TNT.
- PRB M35 mine, anti-personnel blast mine 65 mm diameter 100gram TNT/Potassium nitrate Also known as Nr 257
- PRB 408 and PRB M3409 variant, anti-tank mine 82 mm diameter
- PRB M3 mine and PRB M3A1 (and PRB M1 and PRB M2), minimal metal anti-tank blast mine
- PRB-111 mine, minimum metal anti-tank blast mine (same fuze as PRB M35) Height: 104mm, diameter: 229mm. Filling: 10kilo TNT.
- PRB IV Antitank mine uses PRB-BAC antipersonnel mine as a fuse Height: 99mm, diameter: 228mm. Filling: 9kilo RDX/TNT.
- NR 141 and NR 201, antitank blast mines 201 has secondary fuse at base to act as a booby trap.
- PRB M966 mine, bounding fragmentation mine (copy of United States M2 mine).
- SUMMADE system System Universal Modular Mine and Demolition Explosive consisting of PRB 416 demolition charge, PRB 407 initiator, trip wire initiator PRB 410 and antitank mine PRB 408 adaptable for use in demolition, anti-tank and anti-personnel applications
- PRB-BAC Antipersonnel mine used on its own or mine is secured to the top of the PRB IV, as a fuze, and when initiated, both mines will be set off. 51gram Torpex
- HPD E2 Minimal metal Antitank mine

=== Pyrotechnics ===
- NR 403, Trip flare 60,000 candela burns for 60 seconds Also known as M70/ PRB107
- NR 169 Trip flare 40,000 candela burns for 60 seconds
- Mk1 Trip flare (PRB copy of British Mk1 trip flare) 40,000 candela burns for 40 seconds made during the 1950s
- Mk2/1B Trip flare (PRB copy of British Mk2 trip flare) 40,000 candela burns for 40 seconds made during the 1950s and 60s
- NR 170 Surface aircraft beacon 100,000 candela burn time 3.5 – 5 minutes for illuminating landing grounds

=== Artillery and rockets ===
- NR 269 155mm artillery projectile
- PRB 415, dual purpose anti-tank and anti-personnel 3.5 inch rocket

=== Grenades ===
- PRB M3Bg WP smoke grenade
- PRB 7, hand grenade (same as PRB 8 but without fragmentation sleeve)
- PRB 8, hand grenade with fragmentation sleeve
- NR 16 Smoke WP bursting, supplied to Netherlands mid 1950s fitted fuze No 27
- PRB 103 Polyvalent Grenade hand thrown or rifle launched with or without a fragmentation sleeve with impact fuze PRB-8 or timed fuze PRB-3
- PRB 104 Polyvalent rifle grenade similarto Nr 103 but with booster charge in tail.
- NR 179 Disposable Incendiary grenade launcher Red Phosphorus same specification as German HAFLA-35 Flammpatrone, hand
- NR 208 52 mm fragmentation grenade for NR 8111 grenade launcher
- NR 209 52 mm illuminating grenade for NR 8111 grenade launcher
- NR 210 52 mm Smoke grenade for NR 8111 grenade launcher
- NR 282 / M73 Aluminium bodied practice grenade for training in the use of the PRB 423 / M72 13 mm through hole allows fitting sound & smoke fuse
- M73 drill grenade M73 Aluminium bodied practice grenade for training in the M72 9 mm through hole only allows only inert drill fuze to be fitted
- PRB 404, anti-personnel rifle-grenade (fired from PRB 424 mortar) Either Offensive or defensive with removable fragmentation sleeve
- PRB 405, smoke grenade bursting type White Phosphorus
- PRB 406, rifle grenade illuminating
- PRB 412, rifle grenade Smoke
- PRB HC, smoke Grenade Hexachloroethene type non explosive choice of igniters
- PRB 422, high blast effect grenade launched from PRB 425 hand mortar
- PRB 423, dual purpose controlled fragmentation offensive / defensive grenade currently manufactured as the Mecar M72
- PRB M48 offensive grenade 35% TNT/ 65% Potassium Nitrate with PRB Fuze M48
- PRB M50 Later version of M48 offensive grenade 35% TNT/ 65% Potassium Nitrate but with M50 Fuze 1950's
- M67 Sweep Offensive Adaption of AX.MK3 CHARGE MK2 Sweep grenade converted to 1/2 Oz charge Offensive grenade with Fuze adaptor to take a standard fuze.
- M67A1 Sweep Offensive Adaption of AX.MK3 CHARGE MK2 Sweep grenade converted to 1 Oz or 2 Oz CE charge Offensive grenade with Fuze adaptor as above.
- M67 Sweep Defensive Adaption of AX.MK3 CHARGE MK2 Sweep grenade converted to 2 Oz charge Defensive grenade with Fuze adaptor to take a PRB fuze.
- M67Mk3 Sweep Defensive Adaption of AX.MK3 CHARGE MK2 Sweep grenade converted to 4 Oz charge Defensive grenade with Fuze adaptor to take a PRB fuze.
- PRB 434, anti-personnel rifle-grenade (fired from standard 22mm NATO rifle adapters) or with Jetshot cartridge from a variety of spigot launchers.
- NR 438 fragmentation grenade for NR 8464 multiple grenade launcher
- NR 440 Illuminating grenade for NR 8464 multiple grenade launcher
- PRB 446, anti-personnel offensive grenade based on 423 but without fragmentation coil or ball bearings

=== Grenade launcher ===
- NR 8111 simple high angle hand held FLY-K grenade launcher Grenade launcher closely resembles 52 mm PRB light morter NR 8113 but because of size, weight and accuracy achieved Jane's classify it as a grenade launcher.
- NR 8464 multiple grenade launcher (modification of the FLY-K system) 12 spigots on a rotating base plate for vehicle, light aircraft or any firm base

=== Mortar ammunition ===
- PRB NR161, 60 mm calibre WP smoke bomb
- PRB NR162, 60 mm calibre parachute illuminating mortar bomb
- PRB NR163, 81 mm calibre WP smoke bomb
- PRB NR164, 81 mm calibre parachute illuminating mortar bomb
- NR 233 Smoke round for FLY-K mortar
- NR 234 Practice round for FLY-K mortar
- NR 235 Fragmentation grenade for FLY-K mortar
- NR 236 Illuminating round for FLY-K Mortar
- NR 237 Smoke round for FLY-K Mortar
- NR 254 Low pressure bomb fired with four charges in US M1 and M29 mortars
- PRB NR414, 81 mm calibre high explosive mortar bomb
- PRB NR431, 60 mm calibre high explosive mortar bomb
- NR 436 High pressure bomb 81 mm fired with seven charges in NR 8475A1 mortar
- NR 520 medium pressure bomb 81 mm fired with five charges in Brandt types 61C and 61L mortars

=== Mortars ===
- PRB 424, 52 mm single shot disposable mortar
- PRB 425, hand mortar (also classified as disposable Spigot grenade launcher)
- PRB NR 475 A1, 81 mm calibre medium mortar
- PRB NR 493, 60 mm calibre smooth-bore muzzle-loading mortar
- NR 8113A1 FLY-K mortar (previously known as "Jet-Shot" system) 52 mm calibre
- NR 8120 Grapnel launcher short mortar for launching Grapnel
- NR 8475A1 81 mm Mortar

=== Demolition charges ===
- PRB 407 initiator for demolition charge PRB 416
- PRB 416 demolition charge 400 70 x 70 x 50 mm (SUMMADE sub component)

== See also ==
- Space Research Corporation
- Gerald Bull
