= PRB 408 =

Anti-tank mine

- Place of origin: Belgium

Production history
- Variants: PRB M3409

Specifications
- Mass: 4130g
- Length: 215mm
- Maximum firing range: 100m
- Filling weight: 3330g
- Detonation mechanism: Pressure pad

The PRB 408 is a Belgian square shaped anti-tank mine.

The mine consists of a polyethylene case with a handle in one side and a cylinder in the top of the box. It contains a high explosive charge, a pressure-initiated fuse, a pressure plate and seven fuse wells but no power source. The mine is detonated when the pressure plate collapses by the action of a vehicle.

There is a variant, the PRB M3409, which has waterproof capabilities can be placed in shallow waters, it is probably the predecessor to the PRB M3 antitank mine.

== See also ==
ORDATA
