= Revolutionary Armed Forces of the People =

- Flag of the African Party for the Independence of Guinea and Cape Verde
- Active: 1964–1973
- Country: Cape Verde and Guinea-Bissau
- Branch: Army
- Garrison/HQ: Bissau
- Nickname: FARP
- Colors: Red, Green, Yellow
- Engagements: Guinea-Bissau War of Independence

The Revolutionary Armed Forces of the People (Portuguese: Forças Armadas Revolucionárias do Povo; FARP) were originally the armed wing of the African Party for the Independence of Guinea and Cape Verde during the struggle against Portuguese rule in Guinea-Bissau and Cape Verde. Since 1973, they constitute the national armed forces of Guinea-Bissau. A separate Cape Verdean branch of the FARP constituted the national armed forces of this country from 1975 until the early 1990s, when these were renamed "Cape Verdean Armed Forces".

== History ==
In the process of the preparation of the armed struggle against the Portuguese rule over the then Portuguese Guinea, in 1962, the PAIGC established a Military Action and Organization Plan which defined the general scheme of a military structure. This plan foresaw two types of armed guerrilla groups: area or territorial groups and mobile or intervention groups. In the end of that year, these groups were already armed with hand grenades and PPSh-41 submachine-guns.

The armed struggle finally started on 23 January 1963, with a guerrilla attack against the Portuguese garrison in Tite.

In the I Congress of the PAIGC of 1963, a decision was taken to create the People's Army (Exército Popular) and the People's Militia (responsible for the guarding of the liberated areas), as well as to restructure the Guerrilla.

In fulfillment of the decision taken in the I Congress, the Revolutionary Armed Forces of the People (FARP) were created in February 1964, being constituted by the then also created People's Army and by the already existent Guerrilla. The People's Militia was also created at that time, but was not part of the FARP, being instead dependent from the civil political and administrative bodies of the PAIGC.

The main tactical unit of the FARP became the infantry bi-group (bigrupo), each being constituted by two or more infantry groups, headed by a commander and a political commissar and supported by heavy weapons. Each infantry group included around 18 elements armed with automatic weapons, three machine-guns and two rocket-propelled grenades. The structure of the bi-group was so well adapted to this type of warfare that some of the Portuguese units copied its organization, with General Spínola defending the general reorganization of all the Portuguese caçadores (light infantry) companies accordingly with its model. Besides the bi-groups, the FARP also included independent specialized groups of sharpshooters, heavy mortars, rockets, rocket-propelled grenades, sappers, anti-tank guns and antiaircraft artillery, as well as artillery batteries.

In 1971, the PAIGC proceeded to a deep restructuring of the FARP. These came to be constituted by the Nationalist Armed Forces (Forças Armadas Nacionalistas) or FAN and by the Local Armed Forces (Forças Armadas Locais) or FAL. The FAN included the already existing National People's Army (former People's Army) and the newly created National People's Navy. The bi-groups, independent groups and artillery batteries of the National People's Army were grouped in army corps and these were grouped in armies. The National People's Navy included both naval units as well as Marines (fuzileiros) units. The FAL were the former People's Militia, now being also integrated in the FARP.

PAIGC unilaterally declared the independence of Guinea-Bissau on 24 September 1973, which was recognized by a number of countries. The FARP came so to be considered the national armed forces of the new state. The armed struggle continued however, as Portugal obviously did not recognize this independence, with its forces remaining in which it still considered as its province of Guinea. Finally, following the change of political regime caused by the Carnation Revolution, Portugal recognized the independence of Guinea-Bissau on 10 September 1974, withdrawing its military forces from the new country.

When Cape Verde become independent in 1975, its newly created armed forces became also known as FARP, being constituted originally with some Cape Verdean elements that participated in the struggle in Guinea-Bissau. At this time, there were still plans to unite Guinea-Bissau and Cape Verde, with the two countries being ruled by PAIGC. This plan of unification was however abandoned, with the military of Cape Verde being renamed "Cape Verdean Armed Forces" in the early 1990s.

Presently, the FARP continue to be the official Armed Forces of Guinea-Bissau.

== Organization ==
=== 1964 general organization ===
- Revolutionary Armed Forces of the People (Forças Armadas Revolucionárias do Povo) - FARP
  - Guerrilla (Guerrilha)
  - People's Army (Exército Popular) - EP
- People's Militia (Milícia Popular) - MP

=== 1971 general organization ===
- Revolutionary Armed Forces of the People (Forças Armadas Revolucionárias do Povo) - FARP
  - Nationalist Armed Forces (Forças Armadas Nacionalistas) - FAN
    - National People's Army (Exército Nacional Popular) - EP
    - National People's Navy (Marinha Nacional Popular) - MP
    - National People's Air Wing (Ala Aérea Popular Naciona)
  - Local Armed Forces (Forças Armadas Locais) - FAL

=== Bigroup organization ===
- Commander
- Political commissar
- 2 x Infantry groups (Reinforced bigroups had three or more groups)
  - Chief
  - 3 x Machine-gunners
  - 2 x RPG gunners
  - 5 x Riflemen
  - 6 x Assaulters
- Heavy weapons

== See also ==
- Guinea-Bissau War of Independence
- Military of Guinea-Bissau
- Portuguese Colonial War
- List of weapons of the Portuguese Colonial War
