= PRB M3 mine =

Anti-tank mine

The PRB M3 and PRB M3A1 are plastic cased minimum metal anti-tank blast mine produced by the Belgian company Poudreries Réunies de Belgique in the 1970s and 1980s. The mine is square with an olive drab body constructed from polythene with a webbing carrying handle on the side and an ammonia-free bakelite seating for the pressure plate to be screwed into. The fuze well is in the centre of the seating, with the pressure plate screwed into it after the fuze has been inserted. The cylindrical pressure plate consists of two plastic plates, one of which moves under the weight of a vehicle driving over the mine to transmit the force to the fuze, shearing pins which hold it in place.

The PRB M3A1 variant has two secondary fuze wells, and is often deployed with a M30 anti-lift device. The M30 fuze detonates the mine if it is lifted more than 3 cm. It is also a minimum metal mine, with the only metal components being two spring steel wire strikers and two aluminium percussion caps.

Both versions of the mine are waterproof when new, and can be laid in shallow water, but the mine casing often splits and warps in hot climates, although small splits do not affect the mine's performance. The mines are prone to sympathetic detonation if laid closer together than 2 m. The mine is found in Angola, Chad, Eritrea, Ethiopia, Iraq, Lebanon, Libya, Mali, Rwanda, Somalia, Sudan, the Western Sahara, and Zambia.

In April 2011 it was reported that the rebel forces in the 2011 Libyan civil war were deploying these mines, in contravention of earlier promises not to use land mines. The Libyan National Transitional Council subsequently issued a communique promising to stop using anti-personnel and anti-vehicle landmines, and that their forces will be requested to destroy all stocks of landmines.

== Specifications ==
- Weight: 6.8 kg
- Explosive content: 6 kg of (70% TNT, 15% RDX, 15% Aluminium) (a mix known as Trialene), with Hexolite booster
- Length: 230 mm
- Height: 130 mm
- Width: 230 mm
- Operating pressure: 250 kg
