= Instalaza rifle grenade =

Two Spanish 22mm rifle grenades of the 1960s

Type I Model 61
- Type: Rifle grenade
- Place of origin: Spain

Service history
- Used by: Spain, Portugal
- Wars: Portuguese Colonial War; Sahrawi insurgency (1973–1976); Western Sahara conflict

Production history
- Manufacturer: Instalaza

Specifications
- Mass: 700 g (25 oz)
- Length: 395 mm (15.6 in)
- Diameter: 64 mm (2.5 in)
- Filling weight: 342 g (12.1 oz)

Type II Model 63
- Type: rifle grenade
- Place of origin: Spain

Service history
- Used by: Spain, Portugal

Production history
- Manufacturer: Instalaza

Specifications
- Mass: 510 g (18 oz)
- Length: 333 mm (13.1 in)
- Diameter: 40 mm (1.6 in)
- Maximum firing range: 425 m (1,394 ft)
- Filling weight: 88 g (3.1 oz)

The Spanish munitions company Instalaza made two models of rifle grenade during the 1960s. As well as being used by the Spanish Army, the Portuguese Army also used them in the colonial wars that took place in its colonies in Africa.

The Type I could penetrate 250 mm (9.8 in) of armour, whereas the lighter Type II could penetrate 150 mm (5.9 in) of armour.

Each was propelled by being mounted atop a rifle's 22 mm grenade launching adapter, and being launched by a ballistite (blank) cartridge.

The Type II was enhanced further, with a bullet trap to accept 5.56×45mm NATO.

A further development led to the Type V and is known as the FTV.

== Users ==
- Spain: Spanish Army
- Portugal: Portuguese Army

== Gallery ==
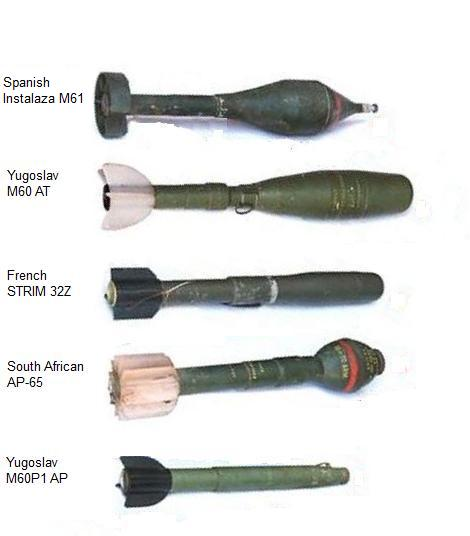
Instalaza grenade and other rifle grenades as encountered during the South African border war in Angola and Namibia

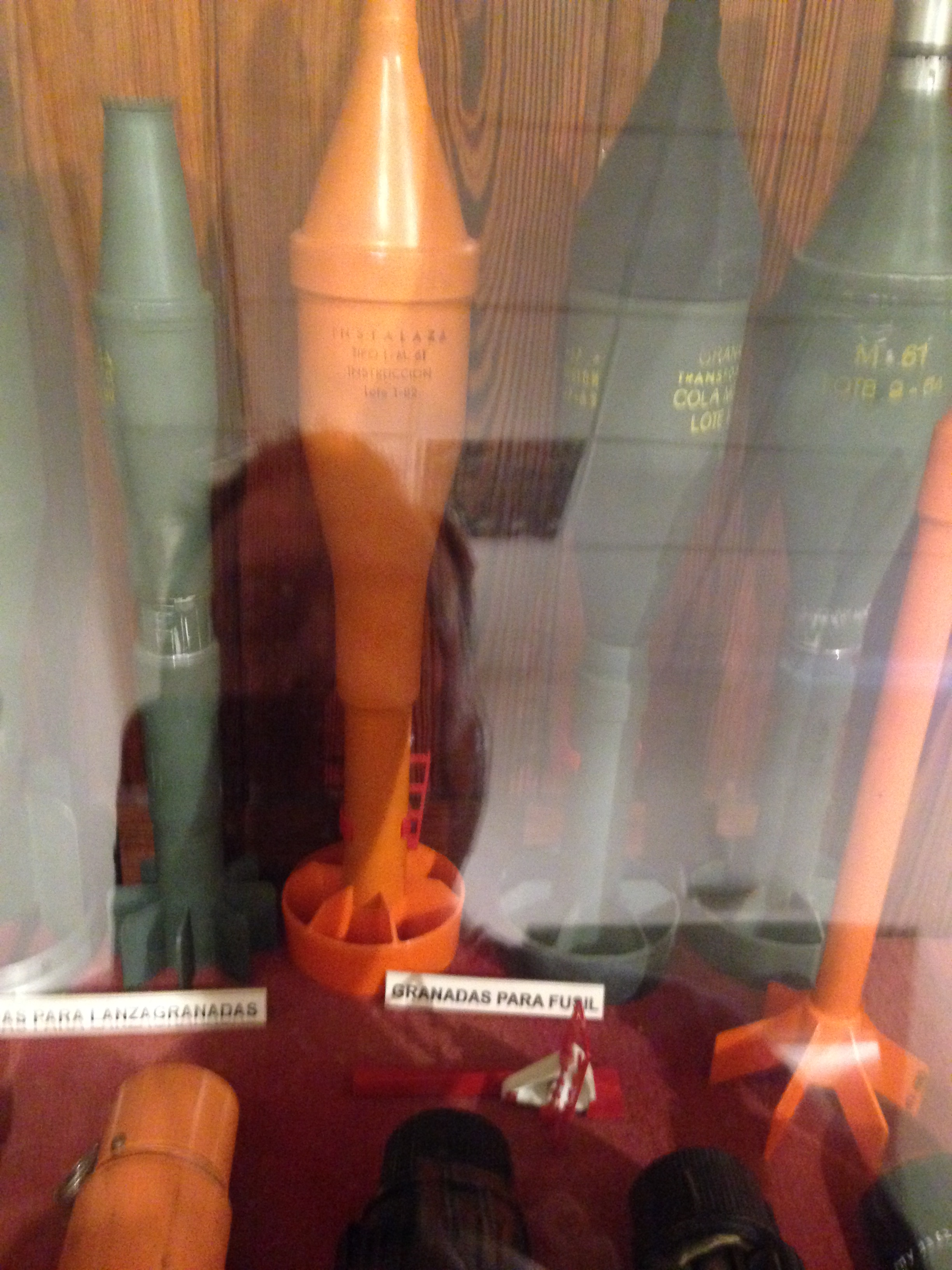
Instalaza rifle grenades on display at the military museum, Valencia
