= ORDATA =

US government database of unexploded ordnance

ORDATA is a United States government database of landmines and other unexploded ordnance, developed to assist humanitarian demining work. The original version of ORDATA released in 1997 was CD-ROM based, and incorporated material from the earlier Minefacts program. ORDATA 2.0 was distributed on a CD-ROM and on the Internet. The database is hosted on the Center for International Stabilization and Recovery website, a part of James Madison University. In 2014-15 the interface underwent a revision and the data partially updated. The new site is known as the Collaborative ORDnance Data Repository (CORD) and is available online. An offline version is in development.
