= TMA-1 mine =

Yugoslavian anti-tank blast mine

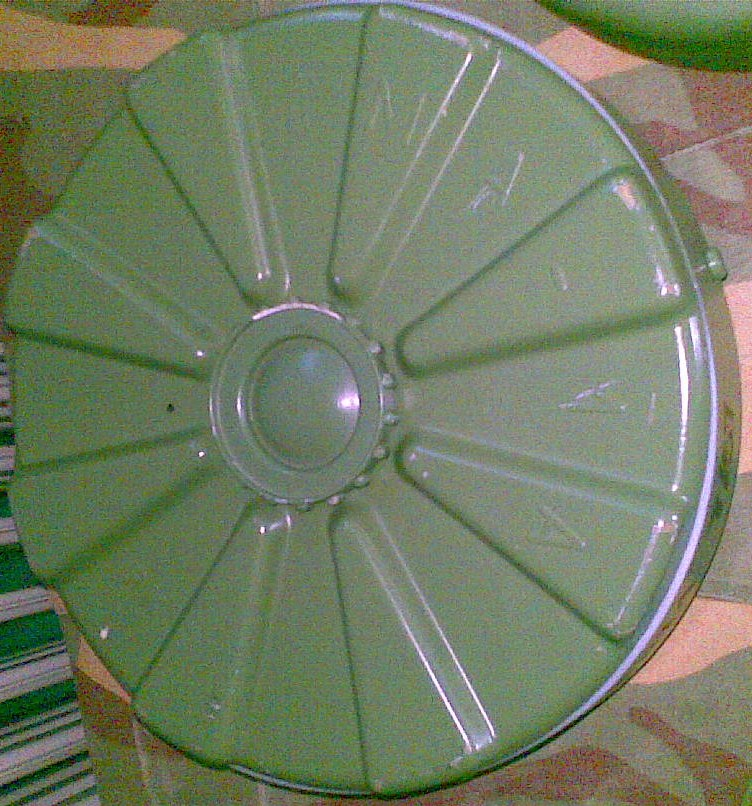
A TMA-1

The TMA-1 and TMA-1A are circular, plastic cased Yugoslavian minimum metal anti-tank blast mine. The mine consists of an upper plastic pressure plate, and the lower body containing the main charge. The pressure plate has eight triangular raised sectors, and a central fuze cap. The pressure plate is held in place by four plastic pins, which when sufficient pressure is applied, shear allowing the pressure plate to collapse onto the mine body, triggering the UANU-1 fuze. A secondary fuze well is provided in the base of the mine, allowing the use of anti-handling devices. The mine is found in Bosnia, Croatia and Kosovo.

== Specifications ==
- Diameter: 315 mm
- Height: 100 mm
- Weight: 10 kg
- Explosive content: 5.4 kg of TNT
- Operating pressure: 100 kg
