= Fábrica de Braço de Prata =

Defunct Portuguese weapons manufacturer

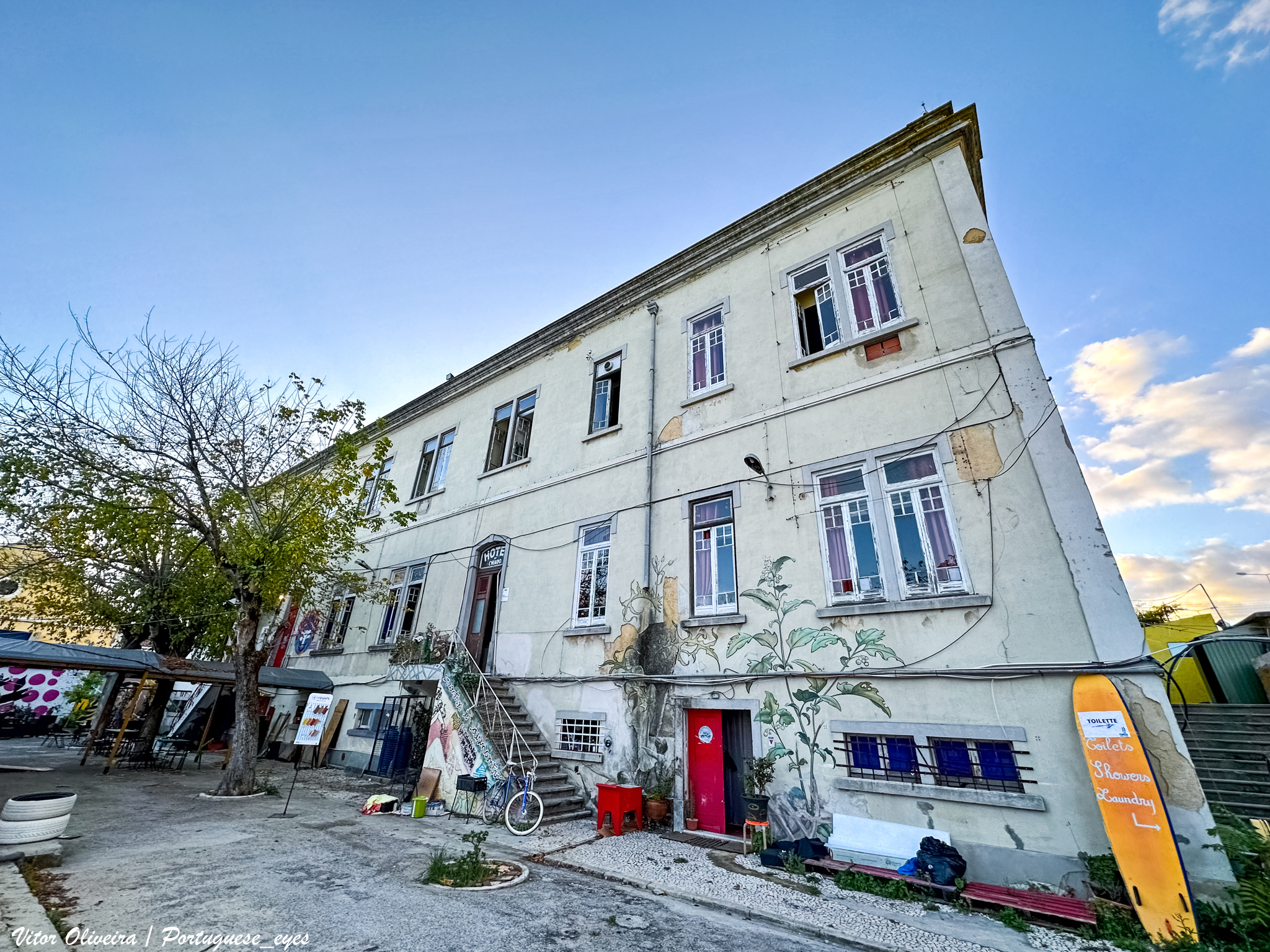
The Fábrica de Braço de Prata building was part of a military factory that now is a cultural centre.

Fábrica de Braço de Prata (Portuguese for "Silver Arm Factory"), (Braço de Prata Factory), originally Fábrica de Material de Guerra de Braço de Prata (Braço de Prata War Material Factory) was a small arms, light artillery, ammunition and ordnance factory owned by the Portuguese Government. It also designed and developed its own armament and ammunition in addition to the licensed production of foreign weapons, including a Portuguese version of the Heckler & Koch G3 (Espingarda m/961) widely used during the Portuguese Colonial War.

== History ==
The military industry of Braço de Prata has its origins in a number of ammunition depots, pyrotechny workshops and armament repair facilities established between 1850 and 1887 and belonging to the Portuguese Army's arsenal (Portuguese: Arsenal do Exército). The Fábrica de Braço de Prata itself dates back to a royal decree of 1902, which mentioned the creation of a new factory at the region with the same name, in Marvila, Lisbon, to replace the Fundição de Canhões and Fábrica de Armas in the production of artillery and small arms. Construction began in 1904 and it was inaugurated with the name Fábrica de Projécteis de Artilharia (Artillery Shell Factory) on 12 October 1907, beginning production of 75mm ammunition for Schneider‑Canet guns on July 15, 1908.

In 1911, with a new reorganization of the military industry, the factory changed its name to Fábrica de Material de Guerra (War Material Factory) and the next year received small arms manufacturing and repairing machinery from Fábrica de Armas, of Santa Clara, Lisbon. During this time, the factory also started producing 81 mm mortars and Bergmann submachine guns. In 1929, the factory began manufacturing Vickers machine guns in small quantities for the Armed Forces and the production of the MP 28 submachine gun to equip the Army and the Polícia de Segurança Pública.

With another reorganization in 1927, the name of the factory changed to Fábrica de Munições de Artilharia, Armamento e Viaturas (Artillery Ammunition, Armament and Vehicle Factory) and the Arsenal do Exército was extinguished and all armament factories taken over by the War Ministry. Braço de Prata's facilities then received major overhauls and was modernized.

In July 1937, a contract was signed with Mauser Werke for the acquisition of the Mauser 98k (M98K) for the Portuguese Army, which were supplied as kits from factories in Germany to be assembled at Braço de Prata. Later in 1941, more 50,000 Mausers 98k were purchased and also assembled at the factory. In 1939, the factory also exported 40,000 7.92×57 mm Mauser-Vergueiro rifles (m/1904/39).

After World War II, another major reorganization of the military industry went underway and the Braço de Prata's factory was renamed to Fábrica Militar de Braço de Prata (FMBP). In 1947, Portugal received aid from the Marshall Plan, being 2.730 million dollars invested in FMBP to expand the factory's Ammunition Section to two production lines, one for artillery and another for mortars.

In 1948, FMBP started the production of the FBP submachine gun, which was found to be simple and cheap to manufacture, and the following year the production of 105 mm artillery shells started with the signing of contract to supply 350,000 shells to the United States Army. Later in 1959, West Germany placed orders for 105 mm and 9×19mm Parabellum ammunition and hand grenades. Those orders contributed to the further expansion of the factory.

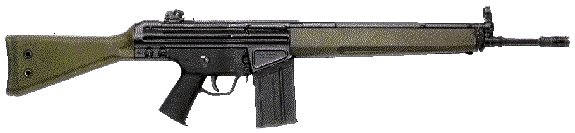
A Portuguese version of the German Heckler & Koch G3A3 was used as the standard infantry weapon for most of Portugal's forces during the Portuguese Colonial War. It would be produced in large quantities in the Fábrica do Braço de Prata small arms plant.

At the beginning of the 1960s, and at the start of the Ultramar conflict, Portugal acquired a relatively small number of assault rifles comprising 2,825 Heckler & Koch G3 and 4,795 FN FAL. After operational field trials in Angola, the HK G3 was selected to equip the Portuguese Armed Forces as the new service rifle. FMBP started then in 1962 to manufacture under licence the G3 (model 63), including the manufacture of its components and parts and its final assembly. Later, West Germany placed an order for 50,000 G3 for its own armed forces.

In 1970, FMBP proposed the merger with its sister Fábrica Nacional de Munições de Armas Ligeiras (National Ammunition and Small Arms Factory, FNMAL); however, it never was followed through.

After the war, there were financial problems due to late payments by the Portuguese Armed Forces in relation to the armament supplied during the war; however exports, specially ammunition exportation by FNMAL, helped both factories remain open. During this time, weapon design and development continued and in 1976 a new version of the FBP submachine gun was developed but never entered production nor was exported.

Following national economical problems, the public defense industry underwent a new reorganization and a new company, INDEP, was created to incorporate the assets of both FNMAL and FMBP, which were to be extinguished in their current forms. However, the factories were never merged and completely absorbed by INDEP and instead continued to exist under its management and under new names. FMBP was then renamed Fábrica de Braço de Prata (Braço de Prata Factory, FBP) and a large part of its facilities were moved to the industrial park of FNMAL, now named Fábrica Nacional de Munições (National Ammunitions Factory, FNM) at Moscavide.

After 1982, a new artillery ammunition company, SPEL, was created as a private company and was owned by both FNM and FBP. In 1986, FBP developed two new projects, led by Capitão Engenheiro Rogério Prina, for the manufacturing of a submachine gun. The first was a license-built Heckler & Koch MP5 but its small serial production was abandoned after INDEP selected the manufacturing of the Lusa submachine gun design developed in the early 1980s. The Lusa was then distributed for evaluation to the Portuguese Armed Forces and some law enforcement agencies, however these decided to purchase the MP5 directly from Heckler & Koch. In 2003, 105 Lusa guns were sold to the British company York Guns and the following year INDEP sold all of Lusa's tooling, machinery and manufacturing rights.

Following the reduction of domestic armament orders and the closing of numerous national armament factories and further major reorganizations of the government-owned defense industry, FBP was closed in 1998 and its machinery, tools and manufacturing rights were sold to companies in the United States and the Spanish Santa Bárbara Sistemas companies, including the 5.56×45mm NATO ammunition manufacturing line.

== Manufacturing ==
Famous products produced include:

- Portuguese M1940 helmet (Capacete m/940)
- FBP submachine gun series
- Lusa series submachine guns
- Morteirete light mortar
- Heckler & Koch G3 (Espingarda m/961)
- Heckler & Koch HK21 (Metralhadora m/968)

== See also ==
- Portuguese Armed Forces
- Portuguese Colonial War
- Field Firing Range of Alcochete
- INDEP
- OGMA
- EMPORDEF
- PTR rifle
