= Lusa =

Lusa, or its diminutive in Portuguese language Lusinha, may refer to:

- Lusa (village), India
- Lusa language
- Lusa News Agency, the official news agency of Portugal
- Lusa submachine gun, a compact 9×19mm Parabellum submachine gun developed by INDEP of Portugal in 1983
- Lusa, a black bear in the series Seekers by Erin Hunter
- Associação Atlética Portuguesa (RJ), Brazilian sports club
- Associação Atlética Portuguesa (Santos), Brazilian sports club
- Associação Portuguesa de Desportos, Brazilian sports club
- Associação Portuguesa Londrinense, Brazilian sports club
