= Corpo de Fuzileiros Navais =

Corpo de Fuzileiros Navais can refer to:

- Brazilian Marine Corps
- Portuguese Marine Corps
