= INDEP =

Portuguese defence company

INDEP - Indústrias Nacionais de Defesa, EP (Defense National Industries, Public Corporation) was a defense industry company owned by the Portuguese Government and created to replace the Fábrica Nacional de Munições de Armas Ligeiras (National Light Armament Ammunition Factory, FNMAL) and the Fábrica Militar do Braço de Prata (FMBP) under the control of the National Defense Ministry. However, these two companies never completely closed. They merged and continued to exist under the management of INDEP with the new names Fábrica Nacional de Munições (FNM) and Fábrica de Braço de Prata (FBP), respectively. The National Defense Ministry also never took complete control of INDEP and required authorization of the Finance Ministry.

On its creation, many of the products FNM and FBP made were branded and marketed under INDEP.

In December 1996, a new reorganization of the Portuguese government-owned defense industries started and a new holding company, EMPORDEF, was created in March 1997. The reduction of the national military manufacturing industry lead to the closing of all factories. INDEP was deactivated in December 2003 and closed for good in 2007.

== Companies ==
- Fábrica Nacional de Munições
  - Fábrica de Pólvora e Explosivos de Barcarena
- Fábrica do Braço de Prata
- SPEL, private company owned by both FNM and FBP and managed by INDEP

== See also ==
- OGMA
- EMPORDEF
