= Fuzileiros Navais =

The Fuzileiros Navais (Portuguese for 'Naval Fusiliers') are the marines of Portugal and Brazil:

- Portuguese Marine Corps
- Brazilian Marine Corps
