= Portuguese Marine Corps =

- Corpo de Fuzileiros
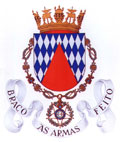
- Coat of arms of the Portuguese Marine Corps
- Active: 1618–1851; 1924–1934; 1961–present
- Country: Portugal
- Branch: Portuguese Navy
- Type: Marines, Special Operations
- Size: 950 (2023)
- Garrison/HQ: Lisbon Naval Base
- Nickname: Fuzos
- Patron: St. George
- Mottos: Braço às armas feito ("An arm to Arms addrest", from Os Lusíadas, Canto X, 155, v. 1)
- Engagements: Dutch–Portuguese War; Napoleonic Wars; World War I Portuguese Colonial War; Bosnia and Herzegovina 1996-2004; East Timor: International Force East Timor; United Nations Transitional Administration in East Timor; United Nations Mission of Support to East Timor; East Timor 2006-Present; Guinea-Bissau 2006-Present; Mozambique: United Nations Operation in Mozambique 1993-1994; Mozambique 2006-Present; Afghanistan 2013; Lithuania 2019-present

Commanders
- Current commander: Captain of sea and war Rogério Paulo Figueira Martins de Brito

The Portuguese Marine Corps (Portuguese: Corpo de Fuzileiros, lit. 'Corps of Fusiliers') is the naval infantry of the Portuguese Navy, responsible for conducting amphibious warfare and performing special operations. It has roles similar to those of the British Royal Marines and the United States Marine Corps Reconnaissance Battalions. The Portuguese Marine Corps specialises in maritime interdiction, providing security at naval bases or shore stations, amphibious warfare, coastal reconnaissance and raiding, commando-style raids, reconnaissance for gathering military intelligence, support special operations, air assault, anti-tank warfare, counterinsurgency, mountain warfare, desert warfare, urban warfare, jungle warfare, maneuver warfare, irregular warfare, indirect fire support raiding, ISTAR, tracking targets, and VBSS operations. Operating as a rapid reaction force, today's Corpo de Fuzileiros is an elite marine commando-style raid force. The Fuzileiros remains an all-volunteer force with an intensive screening and selection process followed by combat-focused training. Fuzileiros are resourced to maintain exceptional proficiency, experience and readiness.

== History ==
=== 16th–18th century ===
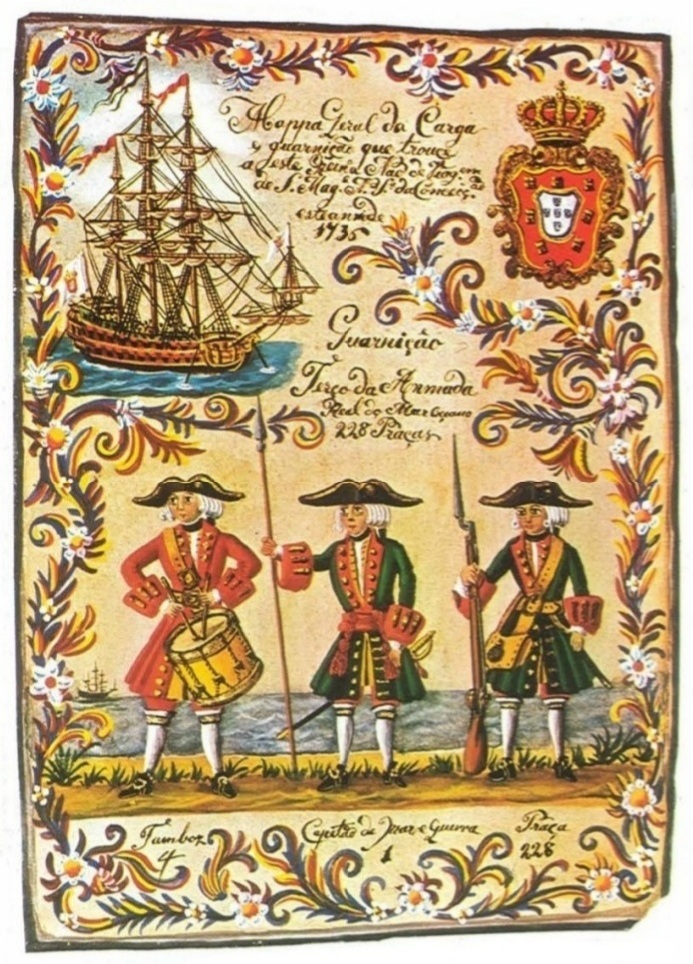
1736 manuscript showing the Portuguese Navy warship Nossa Senhora da Conceição and its garrison of marines from the Terço da Armada. In the 17th and 18th centuries, Portuguese marines were recognisable by their bottle green uniforms

The Portuguese Marines (Portuguese: Fuzileiros Navais) have their origin in the oldest permanent military unit of Portugal and second-oldest marine corps in the world, the Terço of the Navy of the Crown of Portugal (Terço da Armada da Coroa de Portugal), created in 1618. However, since 1585, specialized troops had existed to provide artillery and riflemen aboard Portuguese warships.

From its conception in the 17th century, the Navy's Terço was considered an elite unit. As the King of Portugal possessed only the ceremonial Royal Guard of the Archers, the marines of the Terço da Armada were not only responsible for operating and defending Portugal's warships but also for fulfilling the role of bodyguard of the Monarchs.

In the 18th century, the Terço da Armada was divided into two regiments of naval infantry. At the end of the century, in 1791, a third regiment of naval artillery was added to the force, and in 1797, during the reign of Queen Maria I, all the regiments of the Navy were merged into a new corps known as the Royal Marine Brigade (Brigada Real da Marinha), which included three divisions: Fusiliers (fuzileiros), Artillerymen (artilheiros) and Artificers (artifices e lastradores).

=== 19th century ===
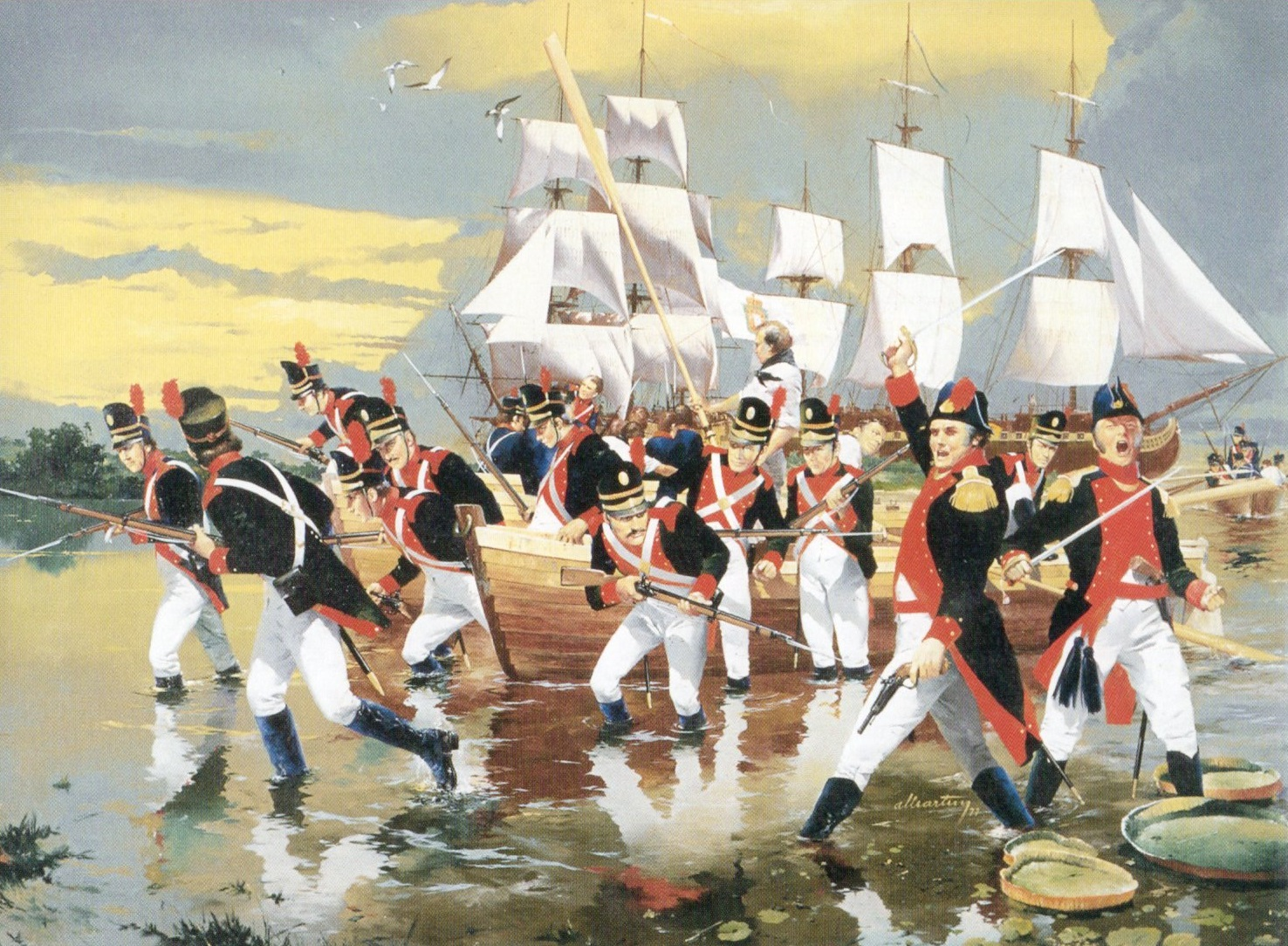
Portuguese marines landing in Cayenne during the 1809 invasion of French Guiana

In 1807, the brigade was reorganized into three battalions, all of them of artillerymen. In 1808, the Army of Napoleon invaded and occupied Portugal. In order to avoid capture and maintain Portuguese sovereignty, the Royal Family and most of the Court relocated to the Portuguese colony of Brazil, aboard the Portuguese fleet and accompanied by the majority of the Royal Marine Brigade. This contingent of the brigade remained in Brazil even after its independence in 1822, giving origin to what is now the Brazilian Marine Corps. In 1809, a force of the brigade in Brazil participated in the Portuguese conquest of French Guiana.

With most of the original force of the brigade remaining in Brazil, in 1822 it started to be reconstituted in Portugal. In 1823, it was organized into two battalions. During the Portuguese Civil War (1828–1834), the Royal Marine Brigade fought on the side of the Miguelite forces. On the opposite side, however, the Liberals created a Marine Battalion (Batalhão de Marinha). In 1832, the Liberal Marine Battalion was augmented and transformed into the 4-battalion Navy Regiment (Regimento da Armada). In 1836, already after the end of the Civil War, the Royal Marine Brigade was disbanded and replaced by the new Naval Battalion (Batalhão Naval) created in 1837.

In each of the ships' crews of the Portuguese Navy, only the officers and the members of the embarked detachments of the Naval Battalion (and previously of the former Royal Marine Brigade) were military personnel, with the sailors being civilians. The different status of the several parts of the crews always created issues.

==== 1851–1924: Corps of Military Seamen ====
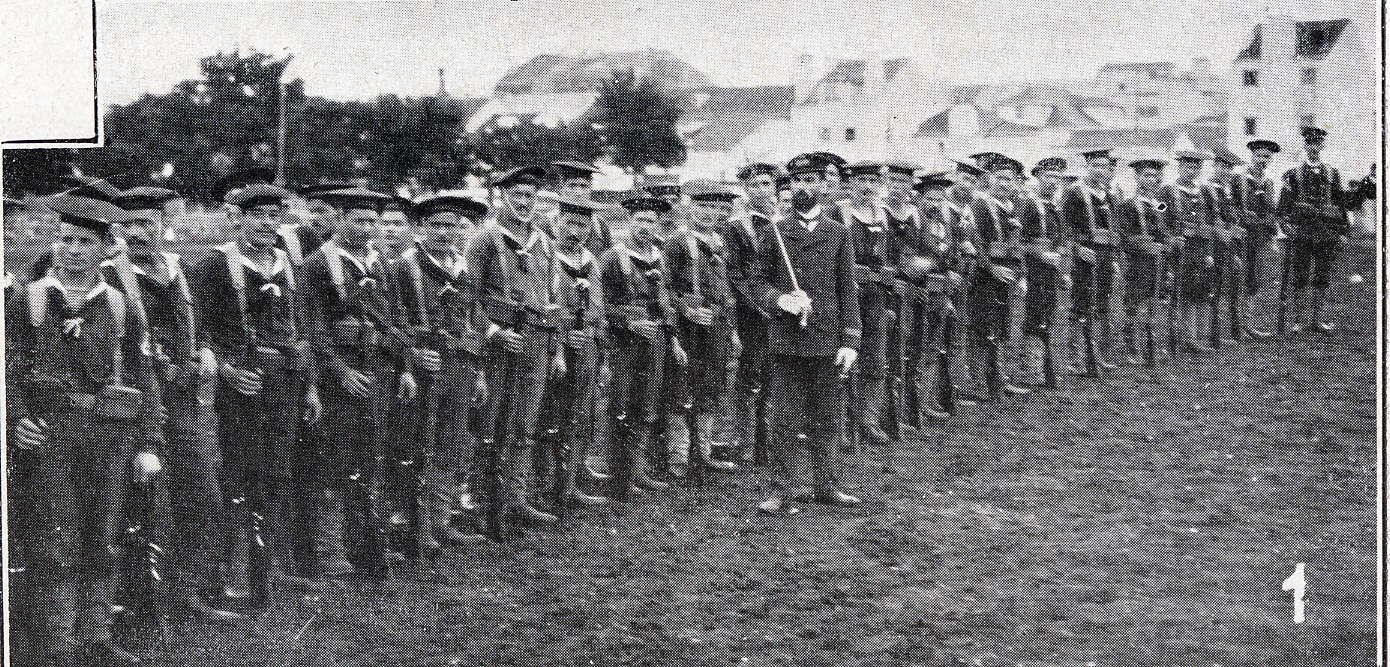
Portuguese marines about to embark for Angola in 1907

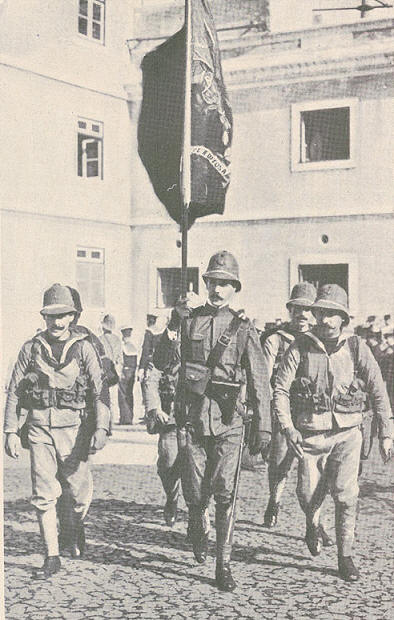
Portuguese marines in Angola during World War I

In 1851, the decision was taken to militarize the sailors, with the creation of the Corps of Military Seamen (Corpo de Marinheiros Militares). This Corps started to be responsible for the providing of the ships' crews. It was organized in 22 crew companies, each one subdivided in two half-companies, plus a depot company. Each of these companies and half companies was intended to constitute the crew of a ship, in rotation. All seamen of the Corps received a general training that included seamanship, artillery, infantry, bladed weapon combat, boarding and amphibious landing. In each company, a number of seamen received an advanced training in naval artillery, constituting its squad or artillerymen. This military training meant that the seamen were able to assume the responsibility to perform also the role of naval infantry when needed, what made unnecessary the existence of the Naval Battalion, which was then dissolved.

From this date, whenever there was a need to perform an amphibious operation, landing detachments were constituted with seamen taken from the ships' crews. For the colonial campaigns of the late 19th and early 20th centuries and for the World War I, larger naval infantry forces and naval battalions were organized in the Corps of Seamen itself.

=== 20th century ===
==== 1924–1934 ====
In 1924, a permanent unit of naval infantry was again created, this being the new Naval Guard Brigade (Brigada da Guarda Naval). However, it ceased to exist in 1934, with the role of naval infantry being again entirely assumed by the regular seamen when needed.

==== 1960–present ====
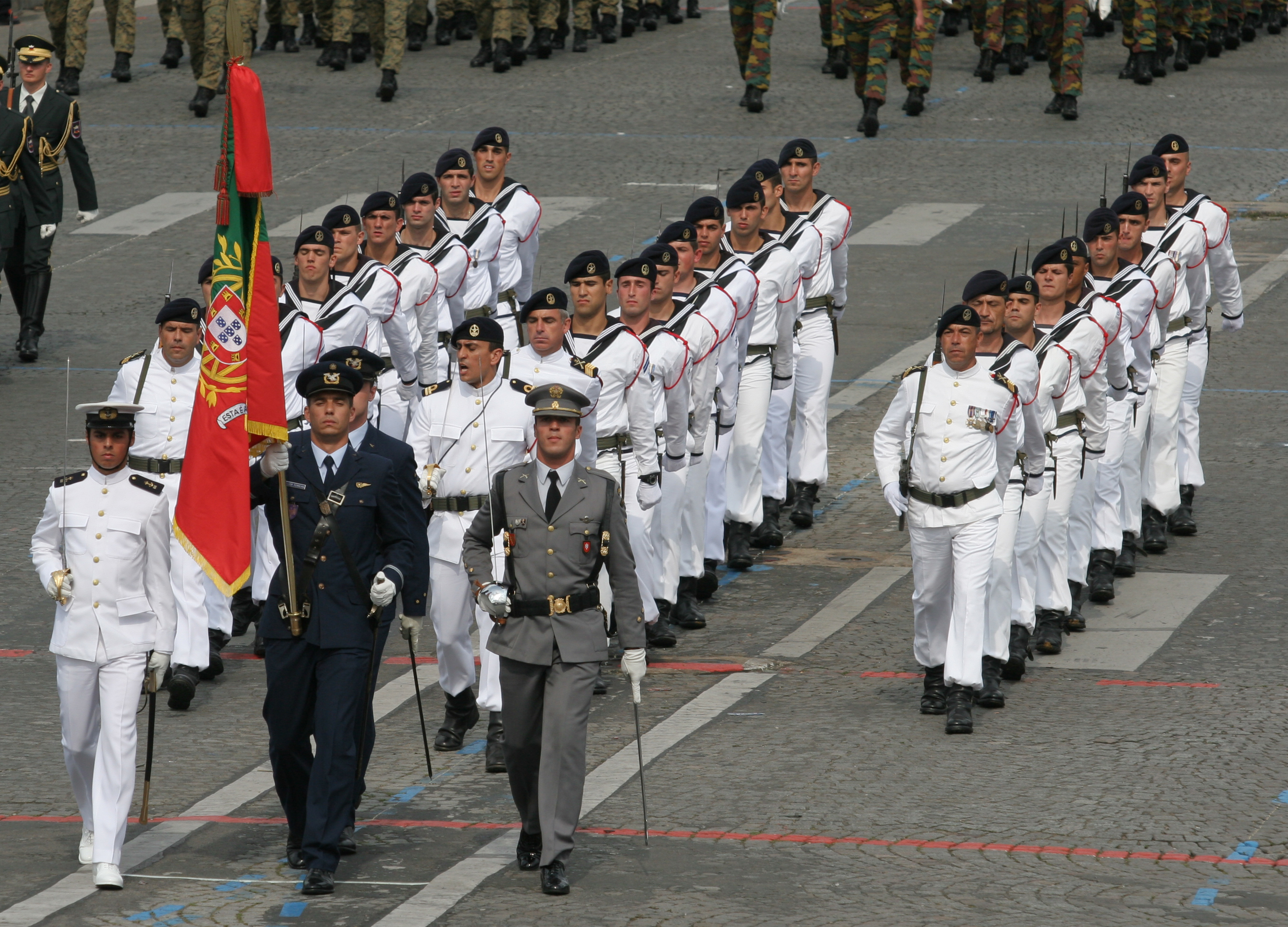
Portuguese marines parading in the 2007 Bastille Day Military Parade

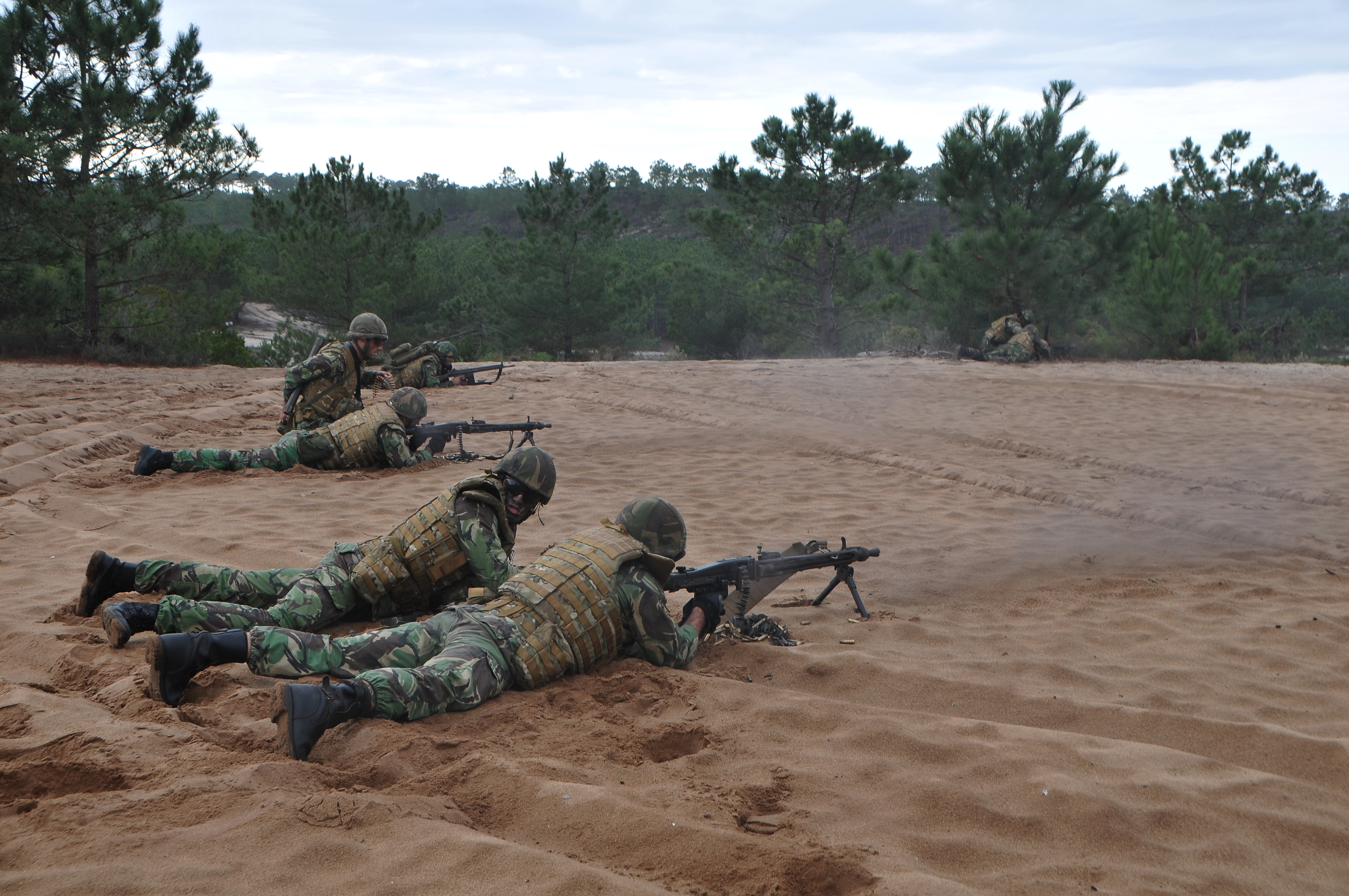
Portuguese marines at a NATO exercise in 2015

The Elite Navy Commandos only reappeared as permanent force in 1961. In 1960, four members of the Portuguese Navy (one officer and three enlisted sailors) were selected to attend the Commando Course at the Commando Training Centre Royal Marines in Lympstone, England, completing it successfully and leading, in 1961, to the establishment of the Navy’s Commando force—the Fuzileiros. Upon their return in early 1961, the Portuguese Navy formally established the Fuzileiros as an elite counter-guerrilla commando force to meet the demands of the Overseas War that began that year.

Following Royal Marines Commandos tradition, those first cadres adopted the green beret—worn pulled to the right with the bronze-shield (Globe and Laurel) badge above the left eye—to signify commando qualification. However, Portugal's airborne forces (Paratroopers' Regiment), who were the first Portuguese to wear any beret (a dark-forest green) starting in 1956, already used green headgear. To avoid confusion, the Fuzileiros chose a distinct dark navy-blue beret.

The starting the formation of the Elite Navy Commando Force Fuzileiros. The Fuzileiros were created in 1961 as counter-guerrilla navy special forces, corresponding to the Portuguese Navy's need to have units specially adapted to this type of warfare, which it had to face within the scope of the Overseas War, which began in 1961. With the beginning of the Portuguese Colonial War. Besides the Marines School (Escola de Fuzileiros), two types of operational marine units were created at that time, these being the detachments of special marines (DFE, destacamentos de fuzileiros especiais) and the companies of marines (CF, companhias de fuzileiros). While the DFE were designed to operate as Marine Raiders units, the CF were focused in the naval patrolling and in the defense of naval ships and facilities. During this war, and up to 1975, more than 14,000 marines fought in Portuguese Guinea, Angola and Mozambique.

Until 1975, a unified Marine Corps Command did not exist, with the diverse DFE and CF being separate units, depending from the several naval and maritime defense commands of the areas where they operated. In this year, the Marine Corps (Corpo de Fuzileiros) was created, unifying all marine units under a single command and become Elite Raid Force. Since 2021, the Portuguese Marine Corps have been undergoing restructuring, with the implementation of the new 'light and fast' concept. This approach enables the application of guerrilla tactics from sea to land, emphasizing mobility, maneuverability, surprise, and superior training as key elements. The goal is to create an elite Marine Commando force, capable of moving, infiltrating, and withdrawing with complete surprise.

== Organization ==
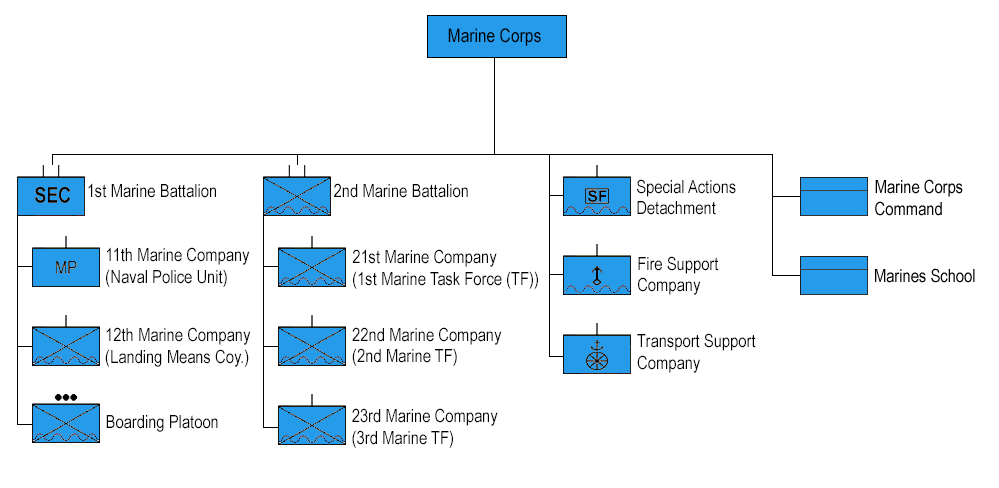
Portuguese Marines Corps Structure

Since 2015, the Portuguese Marine Corps is organized into:

- Marines Corps Command (Comando do Corpo de Fuzileiros);
- Marines Corps support departments (Administrative and Financial, Operations, Resources Management and General Support);
- Marines School (Escola de Fuzileiros) - Training Unit
1. Landing Means Unit (Unidade de Meios de Desembarque (UMD)) - landing craft unit
2. Boarding Platoon-VBSS (PelBoard) - naval boarding unit
- Force Projection Unit

Includes three permanent Marine forces:

1. 1st Marine Task Unit (FFZ1) - landing task unit
  1. Combat Group Alfa (GC.A)
  2. Combat Group Bravo (GC.B)
  3. Combat Group Charlie (GC.C)
2. 2nd Marine Task Unit (FFZ2) - landing task unit
3. 3rd Marine Task Unit (FFZ3) - landing task unit
- Special Actions Detachment (Destacamento de Acções Especiais (DAE)) - SOF unit.

Constitutes a special operations maritime task unit (SOMTU).

The permanent task units of the Force Projection Unit are designed to conduct Commando Raids.

The Marine Corps elements are based at the Vale do Zebro facilities (Marines School) and the Alfeite facilities Marines Base.

== Training ==
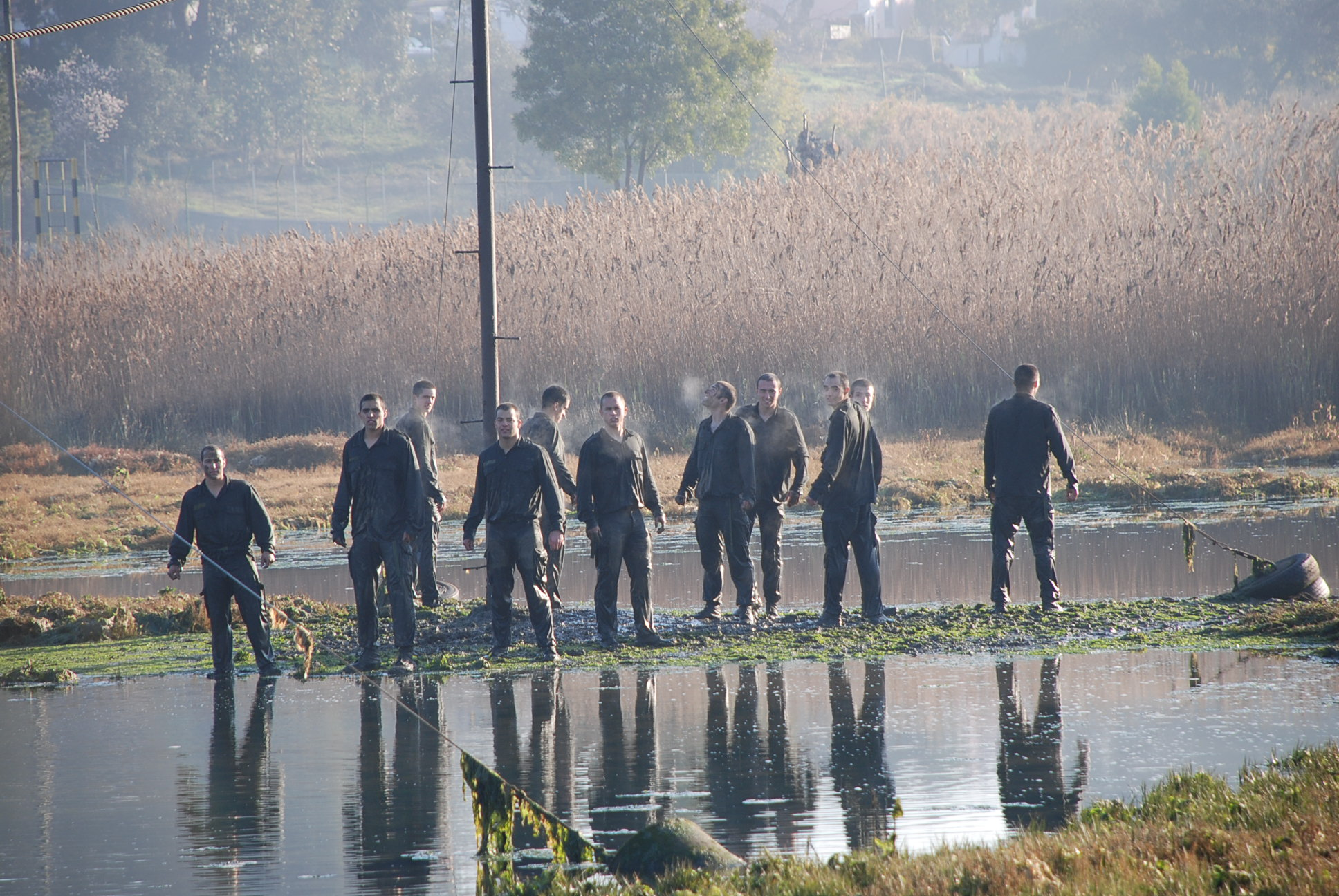
Recruits under training in the Marines School at Vale do Zebro.

Initial training to become an enlisted Fuzileiro (marine) lasts about 42 weeks. The training is conducted at the Marines School (Escola de Fuzileiros) in Vale de Zebro. It is physically and mentally rigorous and demanding, with only 15% to 35% of the initial trainees passing and becoming Fuzileiros.

Since the founding of the Fuzileiros School, training has remained unparalleled: every exercise is timed and scored, and any failure is immediately “punished” with additional physical tasks. Recruits undertake 20–30 km marches with full equipment in all weather conditions; traverse mud and land obstacle courses; conduct night-navigation drills; and participate in intensive weapons instruction, reconnaissance patrols, Commando style raid tactics, ambushes, CQB/urban operations, NBC Warfare, Tactical Emergency Medical, live-fire assault tactics, rappelling, climbing, small-craft handling, basic demolitions, communications exercises, and hand-to-hand combat . The final phase of the course consists of field exercises simulating real-world operations in both terrestrial and amphibious scenarios—reconnaissance patrols, commando-style raids, ambushes, urban combat (CQB), and SERE (Survival, Evasion, Resistance, and Escape).

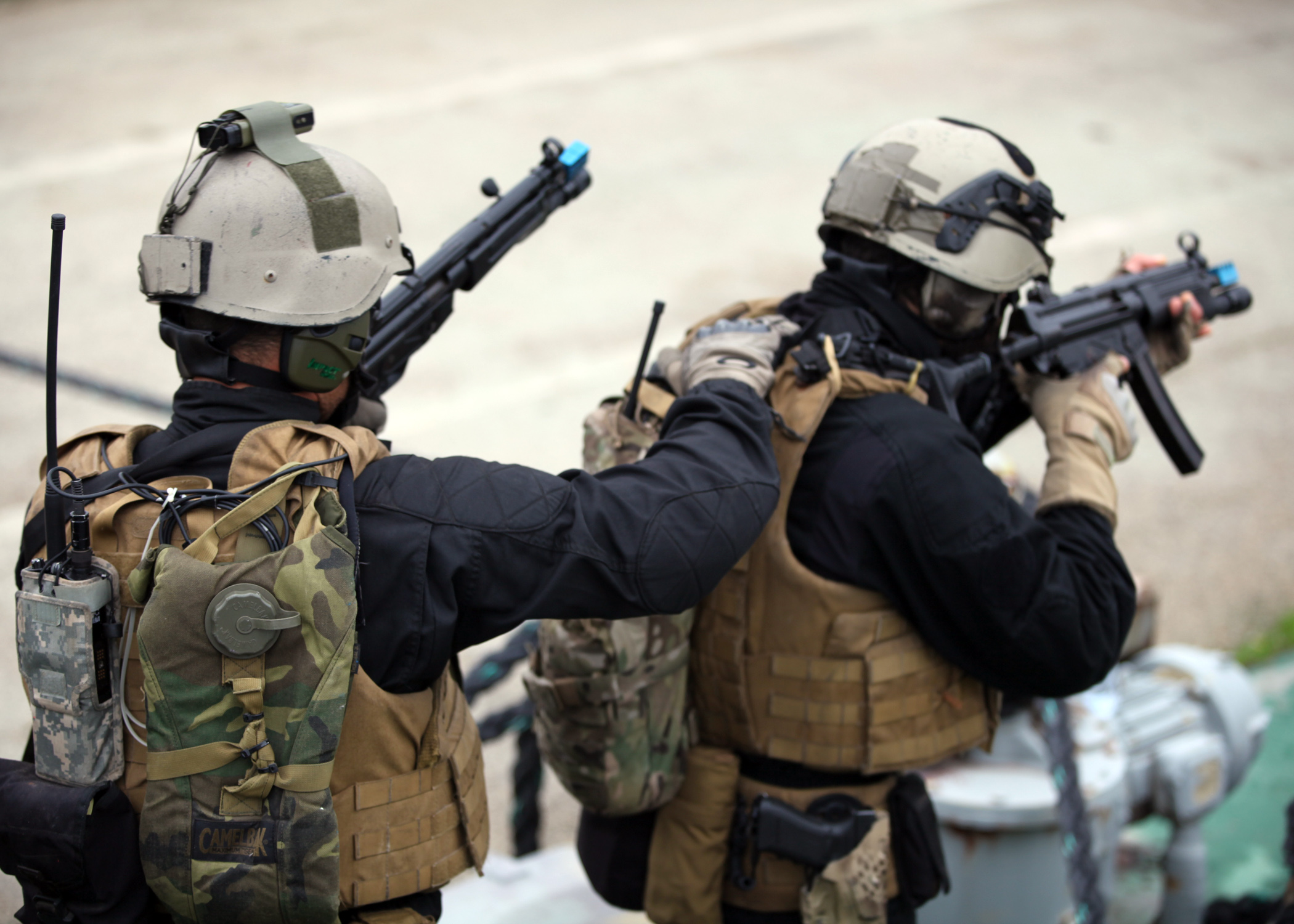
Special Actions Detachment operators

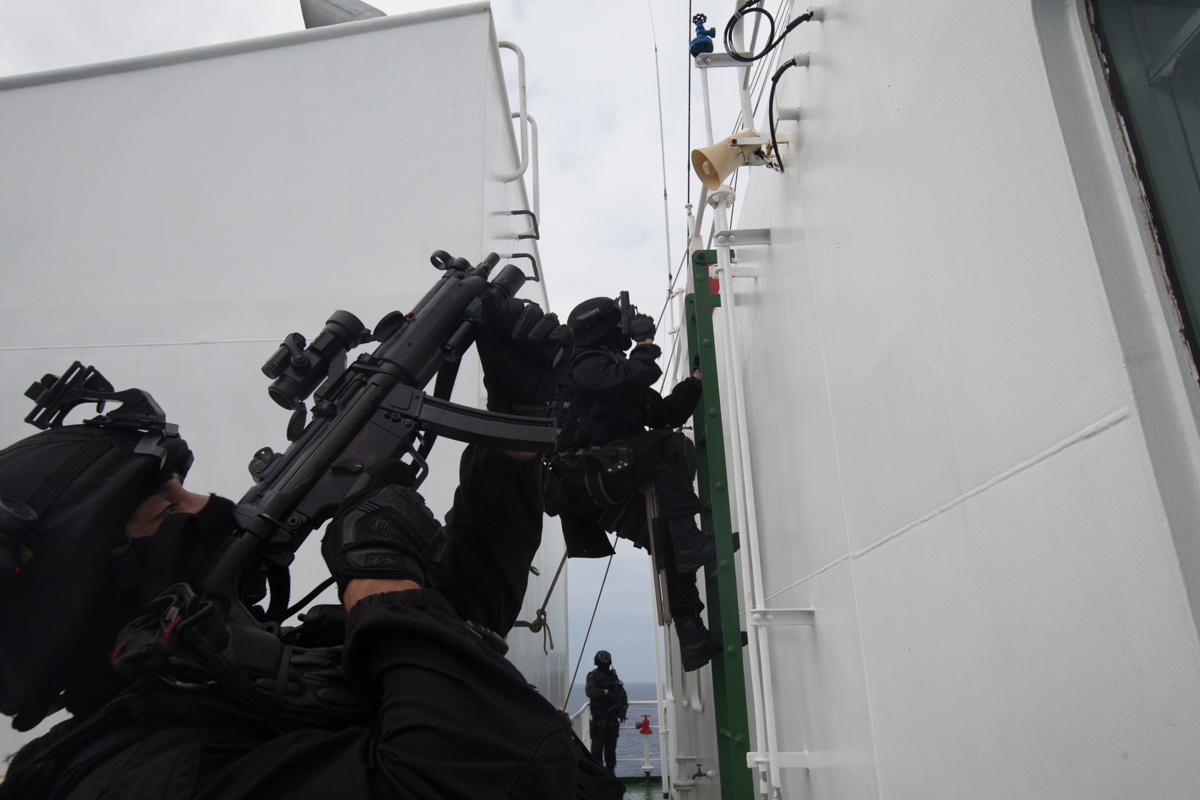
Boarding Platoon members in a ship boarding exercise

Culminating in a 50 km group march to be completed within a set time .

After completing their training with success, the Fuzileiros receive the dark blue beret and the course badge on an official ceremony before being assigned to operational units.

During and after the Fuzileiros Course, Fuzileiros military personnel receive training in areas as varied as:

- Commando style raid tactics
- Unconventional warfare
- Surveillance and counter-surveillance of the battlefield
- Survival, Evasion, Resistance, and Escape (SERE)
- Small unit Tactics
- Basic English
- Long-range reconnaissance patrols
- Escape and evasion techniques
- Inactivation of conventional explosive devices
- Advanced First Aid
- Demolitions, mines and traps
- Combat Shooting
- Driving tactical vehicles
- IED dearmament
- Sapper
- Communications
- NBC - Nuclear, Biological and Chemical
- Abandonment of aircraft in immersion
- Shooting
- Hand-to-hand combat
- Fast Rope/Helicast/Rappel
- VBSS
- CQB
- Others.

== Equipment ==
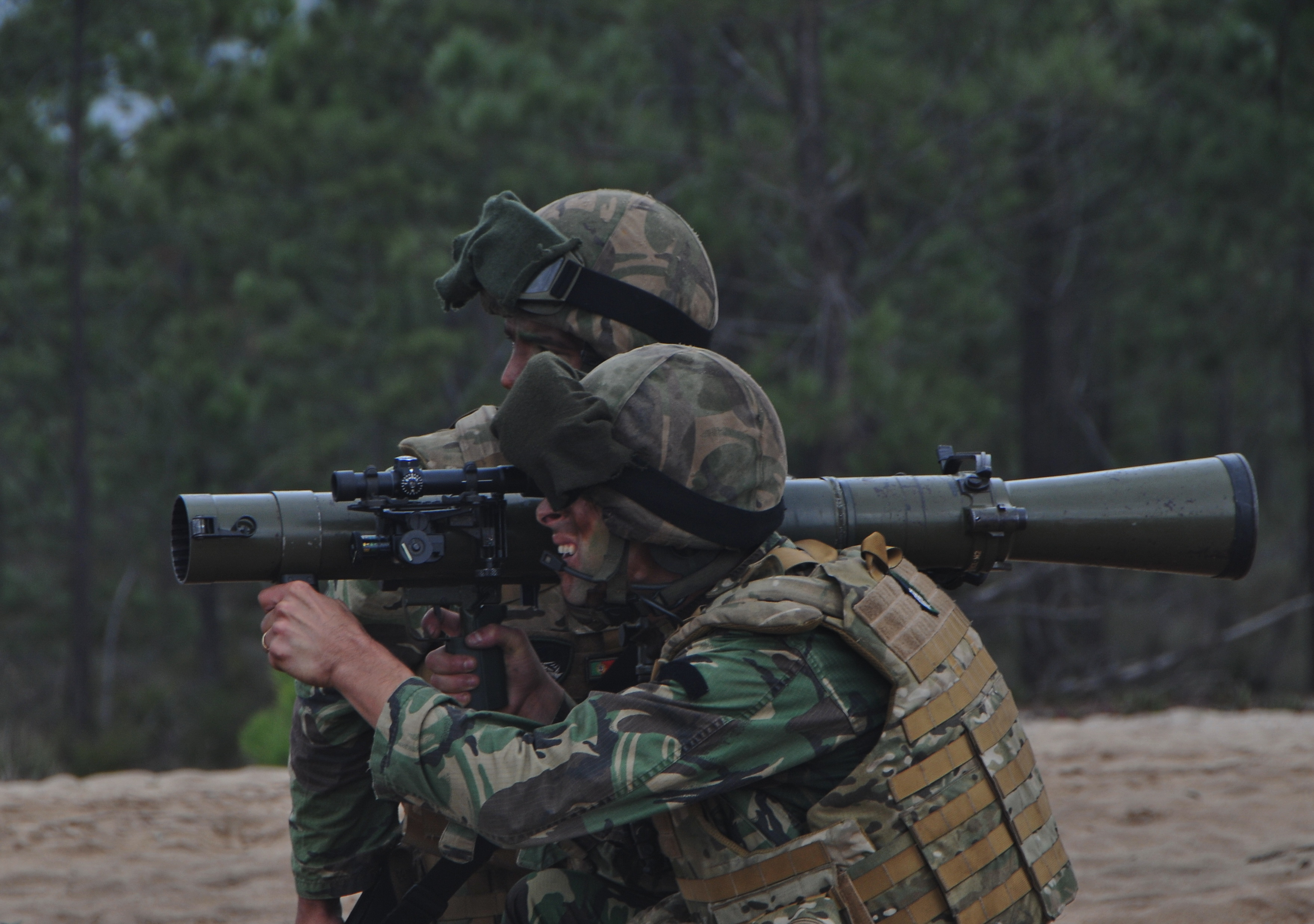
Anti-tank fire support team in a NATO Exercise in Lithuania, firing a Carl Gustav recoilless rifle.

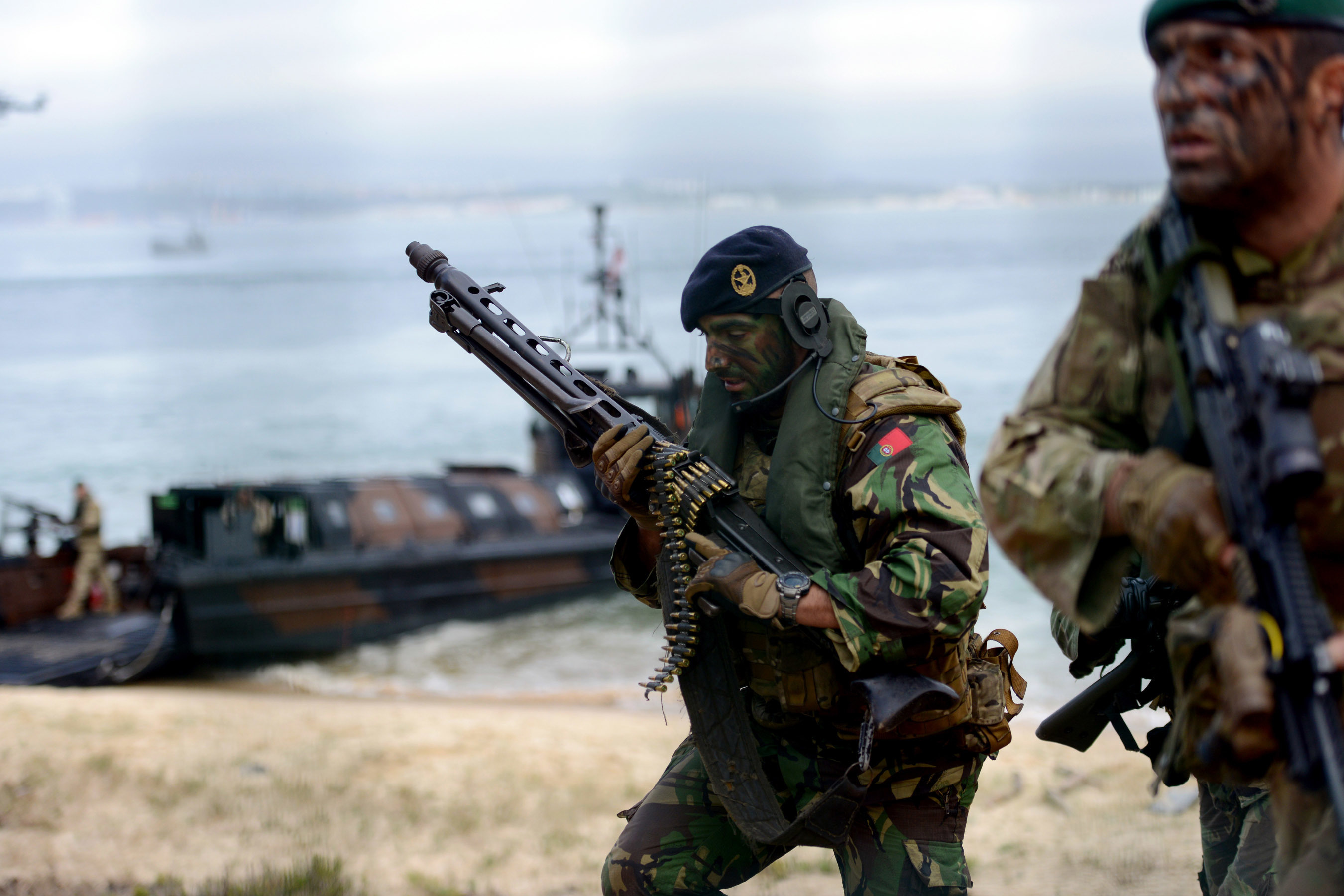
Portuguese Marine landing during NATO exercise Trident Juncture 15

=== Infantry weapons ===
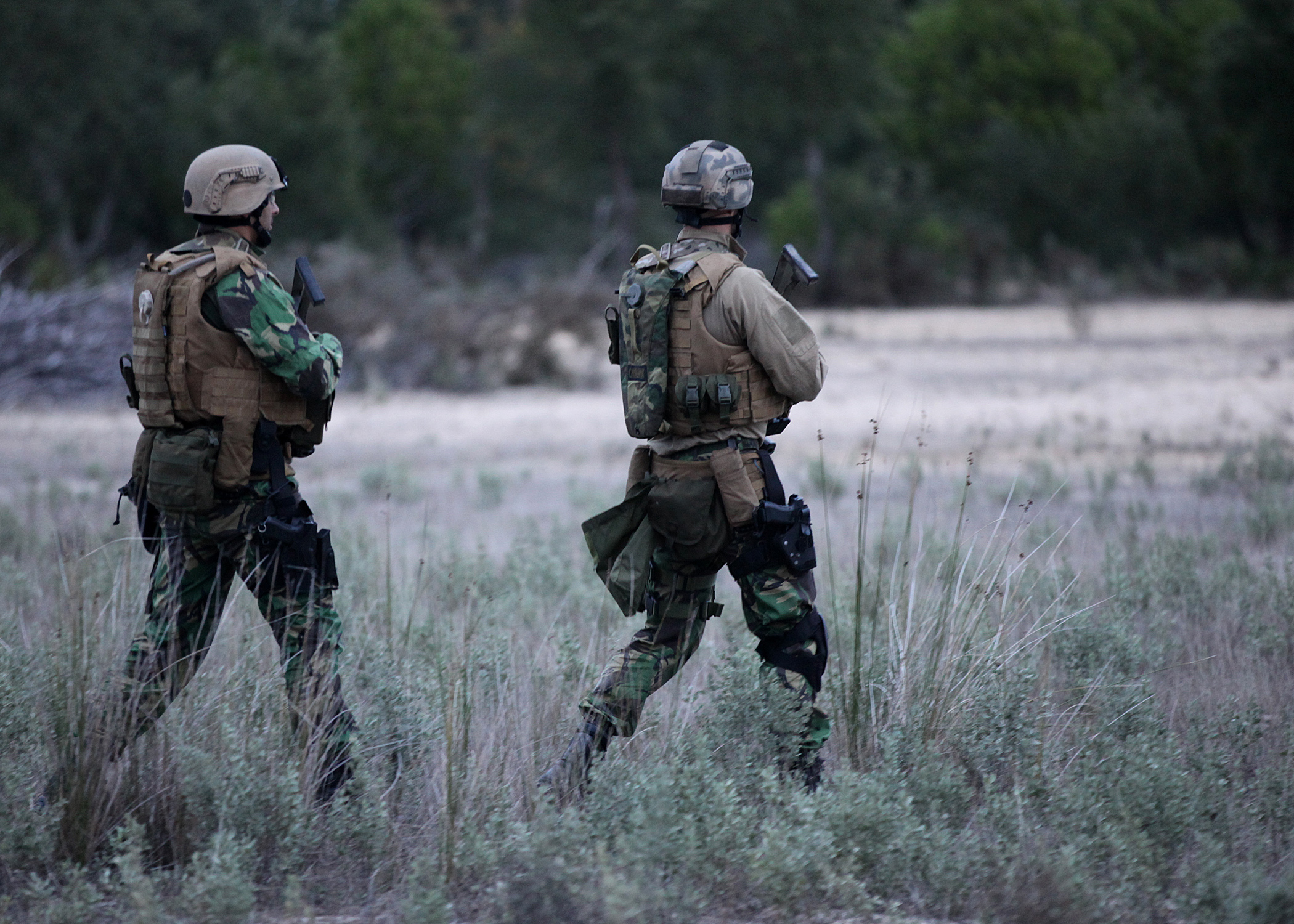
Special Actions Detachment during NATO exercise Trident Juncture 15

Weapon	Origin	Type	Caliber	Image	Notes
Pistols
Glock 17	Austria	Semi-automatic pistol	9mm		250 Glock Gen 5 additional units received in 2023
Submachine gus
Brügger & Thomet MP9	Switzerland	Submachine gun	9mm		Used by Special Actions Detachment
Heckler & Koch MP5A3/A5	Germany	Submachine Gun	9mm		Some modernized with Spuhr kit and Aimpoint CompM4 red dot sight's
Assault rifles
Heckler & Koch G36	Germany	Assault rifle	5.56x45mm		Used by Special Actions Detachment and Sappers Divers Group. Versions C and K are used.
Heckler & Koch HK416A5	Germany	Assault rifle	5.56×45mm		More than 250 rifles used by Special Actions Detachment, Force Projection Unit, Combat Support Detachment and Sappers Divers Group
Heckler & Koch HK417A2	Germany	Battle rifle	7.62x51mm		Used by Special Actions Detachment and Sappers Divers Group
Heckler & Koch G3A3/A4	Germany	Battle rifle	7.62x51mm		Modernized with Spuhr kit and Aimpoint CompM4 red dot sight's.
M16A2	United States	Assault rifle	5.56x45mm		Equipped with M203 40 mm grenade launcher. used by Special Actions Detachment
Sniper rifles
Heckler & Koch HK41A2	Germany	Sniper support rifle	7.62x51mm		Equipped with the Trijicon VCOG 1-6x24 scope, used by Special Actions Detachment.
Heckler & Koch MSG-90	Germany	Sniper support rifle	7.62x51mm		Used essentially by PELBOARD.
Mauser 86SR	United States	Sniper rifle	7.62x51mm		Used by Reconnaissance Units.
AI Arctic Warfare	United Kingdom	Sniper rifle	7.62x51mm		Used by Special Actions Detachment
Accuracy International AWM	United Kingdom	Sniper rifle	.338 Lapua Magnum		Used by Special Actions Detachment
Accuracy International AW50	United Kingdom	Sniper rifle	12.7mm		Used by Special Actions Detachment
Machine guns
FN Minimi Mk3	Belgium	Light machine gun	5.56x45mm		At least 36 units purchased in 2023
Rheinmetall MG3	Germany	General-purpose machine gun	7.62x51mm		Also mounted on vehicles
Browning M2HB	United States	Heavy machine gun	.50 BMG		Used on tripods and mounted on vehicles
Shotguns
Remington 870	United States	Pump-action shotgun	12-gauge		
Mossberg 590	United States	Pump-action shotgun	12-gauge		
Grenade launchers
Heckler & Koch GMG	Germany	Grenade launcher	40 mm grenade		Used on tripods and mounted on vehicles
Heckler & Koch AG36	Germany	Grenade launcher	40 mm grenade		Used on HK G36 rifles
M203	United States	Grenade launcher	40 mm grenade		Used on M16A2 rifles by Special Actions Detachment
Mortars
Tampella B	Finland	Mortar	120mm		12 units used by the Mortar Platoon (PELMORT)
ECIA L	Spain	Mortar	81mm		8 units used by the Mortar Platoon (PELMORT)
FBP Morteirete	Portugal	Mortar	60mm		Fast mortar
Anti-tank weapons
MILAN	France	Anti-tank guided missile	115mm		Some mounted on vehicles
Carl Gustav M3	Sweden	Shoulder launched recoilless rifle	84mm		

=== Others ===
- AN/PVS-14 Night-vision device;
- AN/PVS-23 Night-vision device;
- Schiebel AN-19/2 Mine detector;
- THALES SOPHIE Thermal Imager and Target Locator.

=== Vehicles ===
- Can-Am Traxter HD8;
- CFMoto UForce 1000XL;
- 75x URO VAMTAC ST5 (on order);
- Nissan Patrol;
- Land Rover Defender 90/110;
- Toyota Land Cruiser HZJ73 armed with MILAN ATGM, M2HB Browning or HK GMG;
- Toyota Hilux;
- Mitsubishi L200;
- Mercedes-Benz 240 GD;
- Mercedes-Benz Unimog U1300L;
- Mercedes-Benz Unimog U1550L;
- Mercedes-Benz Unimog U4000;
- Mercedes-Benz Atego 1823;
- Mercedes-Benz Actros 3340 EMPL Fahrzeugwerk EH/TC 30.000;
- Iveco Trakker 330 with communications shelter;

=== Unmanned Vehicles ===
- X-311: Used for reconnaissance and surveillance;
- X-312: Used for grenade launching;
- X-313: Used for reconnaissance and surveillance.

=== Amphibious ===
- 15x LARC-V
- 20x High-speed inflatable boats;
- 3x rigid inflatable boats armed with MG 3 machine guns;
- +47 Zebro III-class inflatable boats.

=== Helicopters ===
- 5x Super Lynx Mk95A armed with one FN M3M and 2x Mk46 torpedo

== Ranks ==
=== Officers ===
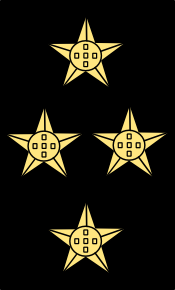
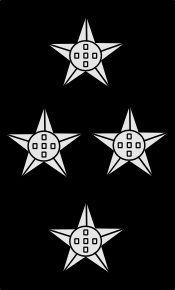
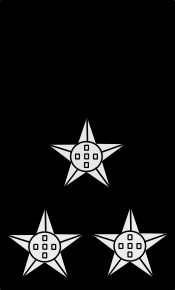
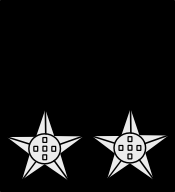
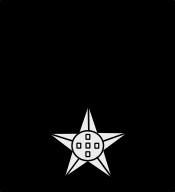
NATO code	OF-10	OF-9	OF-8	OF-7	OF-6	OF-5	OF-4	OF-3	OF-2	OF-1
Portuguese Navy
Portuguese Navy	Almirante da Armada	Almirante	Vice-almirante	Contra-almirante	Comodoro	Capitão de mar e guerra	Capitão de fragata	Capitão-tenente	Primeiro-tenente	Segundo-tenente	Guarda-marinha/ Subtenente

=== Ratings ===
NATO code	OR-9		OR-8	OR-7	OR-6	OR-5	OR-4		OR-3	OR-2		OR-1
Portuguese Navy											No insignia	No insignia
Portuguese Navy	Sargento-mor	Sargento-chefe	Sargento-ajudante	Primeiro-sargento	Segundo-sargento	Subsargento	Cabo-mor	Cabo	Primeiro-marinheiro	Segundo-marinheiro	Primeiro-grumete	Segundo-grumete

== See also ==
- Portuguese Navy
- Special Actions Detachment
- Sappers Divers Group
- List of ships of the Portuguese Navy
- Portuguese Naval Aviation
- Portuguese Colonial War
