= Lusa submachine gun =

Lusa
- Type: Submachine gun
- Place of origin: Portugal

Production history
- Manufacturer: INDEP
- Produced: 1983-2011
- Variants: A1; A2; A3; 94; 94 AWM; SP89

Specifications
- Mass: 2.8 kg (6.17 lb)
- Length: 584 mm (23.0 in) stock extended / 451 mm (17.8 in) stock folded
- Barrel length: 159 mm (6.3 in)
- Cartridge: 9×19mm Parabellum
- Action: Blowback, closed bolt, hammer fired
- Rate of fire: 900 rounds/min
- Feed system: 10, 28, 30-round, double-stack staggered-feed box magazine
- Sights: Iron sights

The Lusa is a compact 9×19mm Parabellum submachine gun developed by INDEP of Portugal in 1983. Its name is derived from Lusitania, which was the Roman name for the Iberian region that covers present day central and southern Portugal and part of Spain. Although it was originally intended for military use, it was well-suited for law enforcement and ended up being marketed to bodyguards, VIP protection and special operations units.

== Development ==
INDEP was a defense industry company owned by the Portuguese Government. In the early 1980s, INDEP manufactured the HK G3 and HK 21 in Portugal under license from Heckler & Koch. This allowed for the importation of German weapons manufacturing machinery and technical know-how, which stimulated development of new firearms designs in Portugal.

The Lusa marries some concepts from the HK MP5 and Uzi submachine gun without being too similar to either. The complete trigger housing is nearly identical to that of the MP5, however the other internals are greatly simplified. The bolt and carrier are one welded unit, and the action is a simple blowback, unlike the roller-delay system of the MP5. The Lusa fires from the closed bolt position in both semi- and fully automatic modes. However, the Lusa's barrel can be quickly changed without tools, like the Uzi. The Lusa uses a non reciprocating ambidextrous charging handle with no provision to lock the bolt to the rear, nor does the bolt lock to the rear upon an empty magazine. The rear sight is a simple diopter with screw adjustment. The body is formed from a sheet of stamped and welded steel.

The weapon never enjoyed widespread production, and the project was halted in 1992, at a cost of 2.5 million dollars. The MP5 soon replaced this weapon's intended usage in the Portuguese police forces. In 2004, INDEP sold all the dies, tooling, fixtures and manufacturing rights to Stan Andrewski, owner of Stan's Gunsmithing in New Hampshire, Jerry Prasser, owner of Recon Ordnance in Wisconsin, and Ralph Dimicco, co-owner of Riley's Gun Shop. The company was named LUSA USA.

The LUSA was approved for sale as a semi-automatic by the BATFE (Bureau of Alcohol, Tobacco, Firearms, and Explosives) for the US civilian market. A select-fire model was available to law enforcement and government agencies, both foreign and domestic. Class III dealers could obtain one with the required LE demonstration letter.

As of 2006, LUSA USA planned to offer conversion kits in .22 Long Rifle, .40 S&W and .45 GAP but distribution of these never materialized. Choate side-folding stocks, sight rails and suppressors were available on a limited basis. Most models shipped with either a fixed stock or a collapsible stock.

== Models ==
There were several available configurations for the semi-auto (SA) civilian version.

- Lusa 94 - carbine, 16" barrel with faux suppressor (barrel shroud), collapsible stock. 30-round magazine.
- Lusa 94 AWM - carbine, 16" barrel with faux suppressor (barrel shroud), fixed stock. Available with 30- or 10-round magazine.
- Lusa SP89 - pistol, 6" unshrouded barrel, no stock. 30-round magazine.
- Lusa A3 SBR - short barreled rifle, 6" unshrouded barrel, collapsible stock. 30-round magazine.

== Magazines ==
A drawback of the Lusa is that it uses a proprietary magazine that is not widely available and is somewhat expensive. The magazines are all marked 30 rounds, but much of the company literature refers to them as having a 28-round capacity. This is probably because it is difficult to load a full 30 rounds and still insert the magazine against the closed bolt, since the Lusa has no provision to lock the bolt to the rear. The additional spring pressure makes it more difficult to fully seat the magazine. The 28-round recommendation is to ensure reliable magazine insertion. The magazines are of a double-stack staggered-feed type, feeding alternately from each side of the magazine.

== End of production ==
In 2011, LUSA USA ceased production of Lusa pistols and carbines citing production costs. Recon Ordnance is currently producing parts for the NiteScout 9mm pistol and carbine, a design which is produced in Waterbury, CT by NiteScout LLC. The NiteScout bears a significant resemblance to the Lusa with some changes. Chiefly, it uses common 32-round Uzi magazines, an HK Navy style composite trigger group, an AR-style front sight and an HK-style rear drum sight. Further it eschews the early Lusa symmetrical charging handle for a left side cocking handle which can lock the bolt to the rear and be "slapped" forward to release, similar to the MP5 and HK91.

== See also ==
- List of submachine guns
- FGC-9
