= Portuguese M1940 helmet =

Combat helmet used by the Armed Forces of Portugal

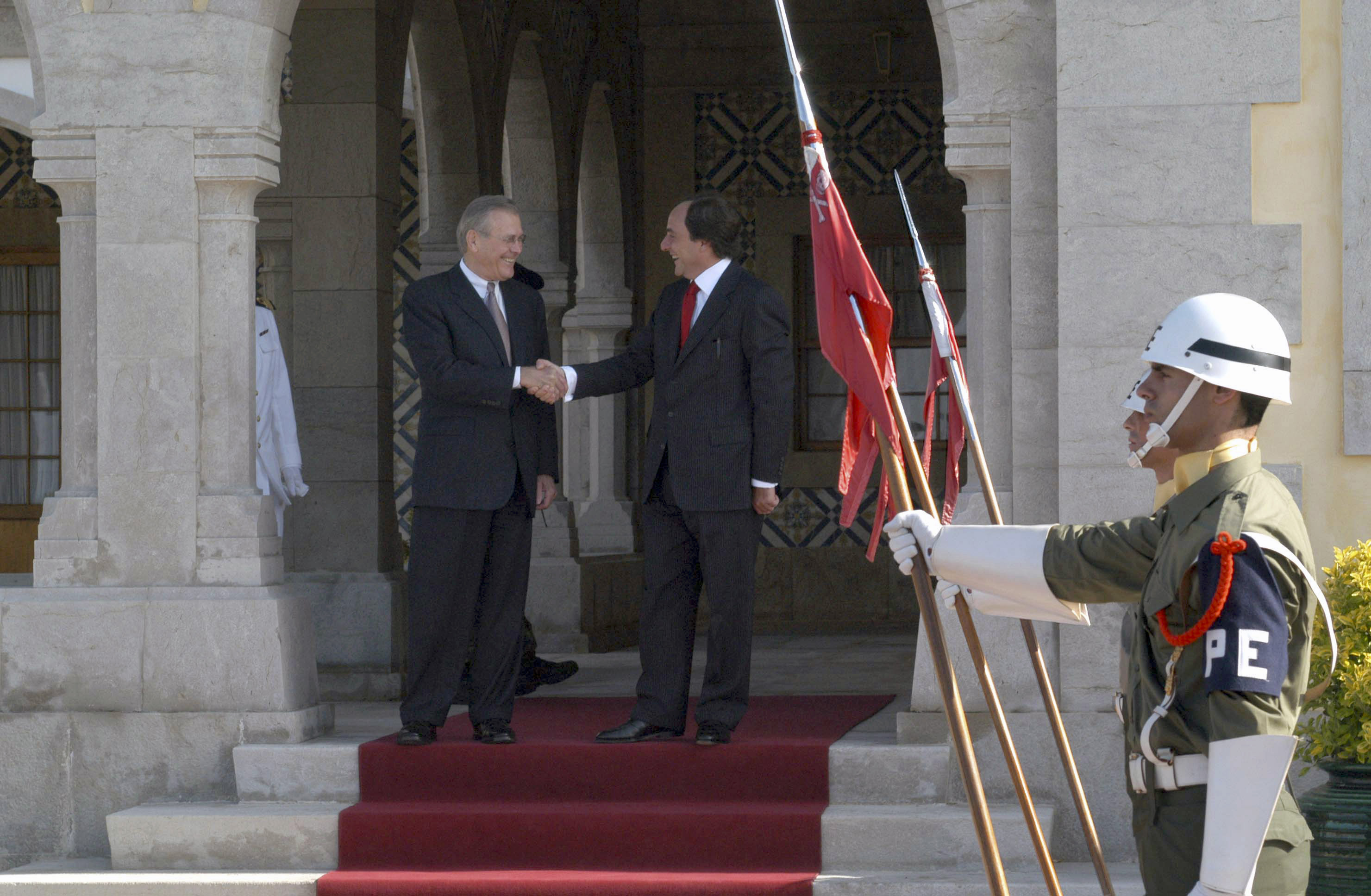
Soldiers of a 2nd Lancers Regiment honor guard wearing white M1940-63 helmets.

The M1940 helmet was the primary combat helmet used by the Armed Forces of Portugal, from the 1940s to the late 1960s. The M1940-63 and the M1940-63 Paratrooper are improved versions of the M1940 helmet that were introduced in the 1960s and are still in limited use. Besides being used by the Armed Forces, the M1940 and the M1940-63 helmets were also used by the Portuguese Security Forces, including the Public Security Police and the National Republican Guard (GNR). This helmet was largely replaced by the PASGT in the early 1990s.

== History ==
Until the early 1940s, the standard combat helmet of the Portuguese Army was the Brodie helmet, adopted during World War I, two versions of which were in use, referred in Portuguese service as the M1916 and the M1917.

In the late 1930s, it was decided to replace the M1916 and M1917 by a new modern helmet. Several foreign helmets were tested and finally a Portuguese design was adopted in 1940, being designated M1940. The M1940 was allegedly inspired in the design of helmets used by the Portuguese soldiers of the 15th century. It was made of steel and manufactured by the Fábrica de Braço de Prata (military factory of Braço de Prata) in Lisbon.

In the early 1960s, a modernized version of the M1940 was developed and adopted in 1963 as the M1940-63. The M1940-63 had a variant specifically designed for use by paratroopers.

From 1961 to 1974, the M1940 and the M1940-63 helmets were used in combat by the Portuguese Armed and Security Forces in the Portuguese Overseas War.

Although largely replaced in the late 1980s by modern kevlar combat helmets, the M1940-63 is still in limited use, namely as a ceremonial helmet used by the Portuguese Army's Military Police.
