= Special Actions Detachment =

Special operations maritime unit of the Portuguese Navy

- Destacamento de Ações Especiais
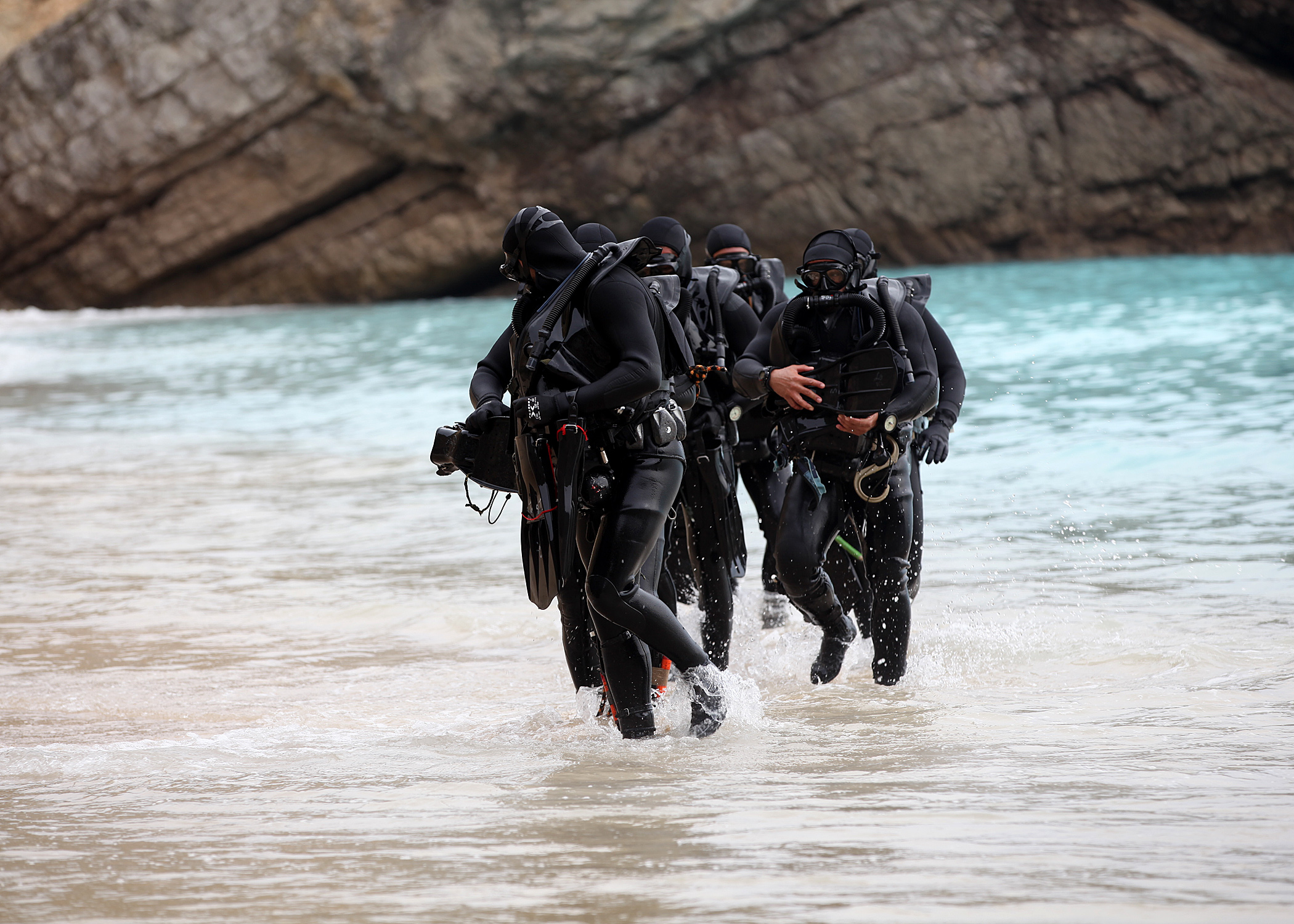
- Portuguese Special Actions Detachment during NATO exercise Trident Juncture 15
- Active: 1985–present
- Country: Portugal
- Allegiance: Portuguese Navy
- Type: Special forces
- Role: Special operations
- Size: 60
- Part of: Portuguese Marine Corps
- Garrison/HQ: Lisbon Naval Base
- Nickname: DAE
- Mottos: Braço Às Armas Feito ("An arm to Arms addrest", from The Lusiads, Canto X, 155, v. 1)
- Engagements: Operation Cruzeiro do Sul, Angola 1992; Operation Forrez, Zaire 1997; Operation Crocodilo, Guinea-Bissau 1998; Operation Forrec, D.R Congo 1998; Operation Tarrafo, Guinea-Bissau 1999; INTERFET, Timor-Leste 1999–2000; EUFOR, D.R. Congo 2006, Somalia 2008; Operation Atalanta 2008–present Afghanistan 2013; Mali; NATO Assurance Measures Lithuania 2019–present Operation Irini 2021–present Takuba Task Force 2021–2022

The Special Actions Detachment (Portuguese: Destacamento de Ações Especiais) or DAE is a special forces unit of the Portuguese Navy. It is part of the Portuguese Marine Corps. Raised in 1985, the DAE is one of the smallest special forces units within the Portuguese Armed Forces. It is responsible for conducting air-sea rescue, amphibious reconnaissance, amphibious warfare, black operation, bomb disposal, CBRN defense, coastal raiding, counterterrorism, direct action, executive protection, hostage rescue, irregular warfare, ISTAR, long-range penetration, JTAC, manhunt high-value target, maritime sabotage, mountain rescue, naval boarding, operation behind high risk enemy lines, special operations, special reconnaissance, tracking targets, underwater demolition, unconventional warfare, other missions in support of Portuguese and NATO armed forces. DAE's mission and training are similar to their American counterparts DEVGRU and the British SBS. DAE often trains with them alongside other counter-terror units.

== Organization ==
The unit is led by a commander, and is subdivided into a command cell and four combat teams. The command cell contains the unit commander, his deputy (a lieutenant commander) and a small staff of eight. The combat teams are composed of ten men: petty officers and seamen and a commanding petty officer.

The unit can operate, as a whole, organized as a Special Operation Maritime Task Unit (SOMTU). As a SOMTU, it can operate autonomously or, together with the Portuguese Army Special Operations Forces, as part of a joint Special Operation Task Group (SOTG). It can also operate, together with special forces of allied countries, as part of a combined SOTG.

== Selection and training ==
DAE operatives are drawn from the ranks of marines, all having high operational experience. Due to the nature of its actions, candidate acceptance is extremely restrictive and selective. Only 5–10% of the applicants manage to join the unit.

Upon completion of the basic selection phase prospective recruits then begin the first phase of their training. Phase 1 of their training is conducted at the Navy's combat diver school. Students receive instruction in: basic combat diving techniques, EOD and underwater demolitions. Candidates who successfully complete the first phase are assigned to the DAE on a probationary status, and begin their second phase of training. Phase 2 instruction includes courses on: escape and evasion techniques, advanced driving, mountaineering, offensive operations, parachuting training and basic English. Once a trainee is permanently assigned to the DAE he will continue to receive various courses of instruction throughout his career.

== Operations ==
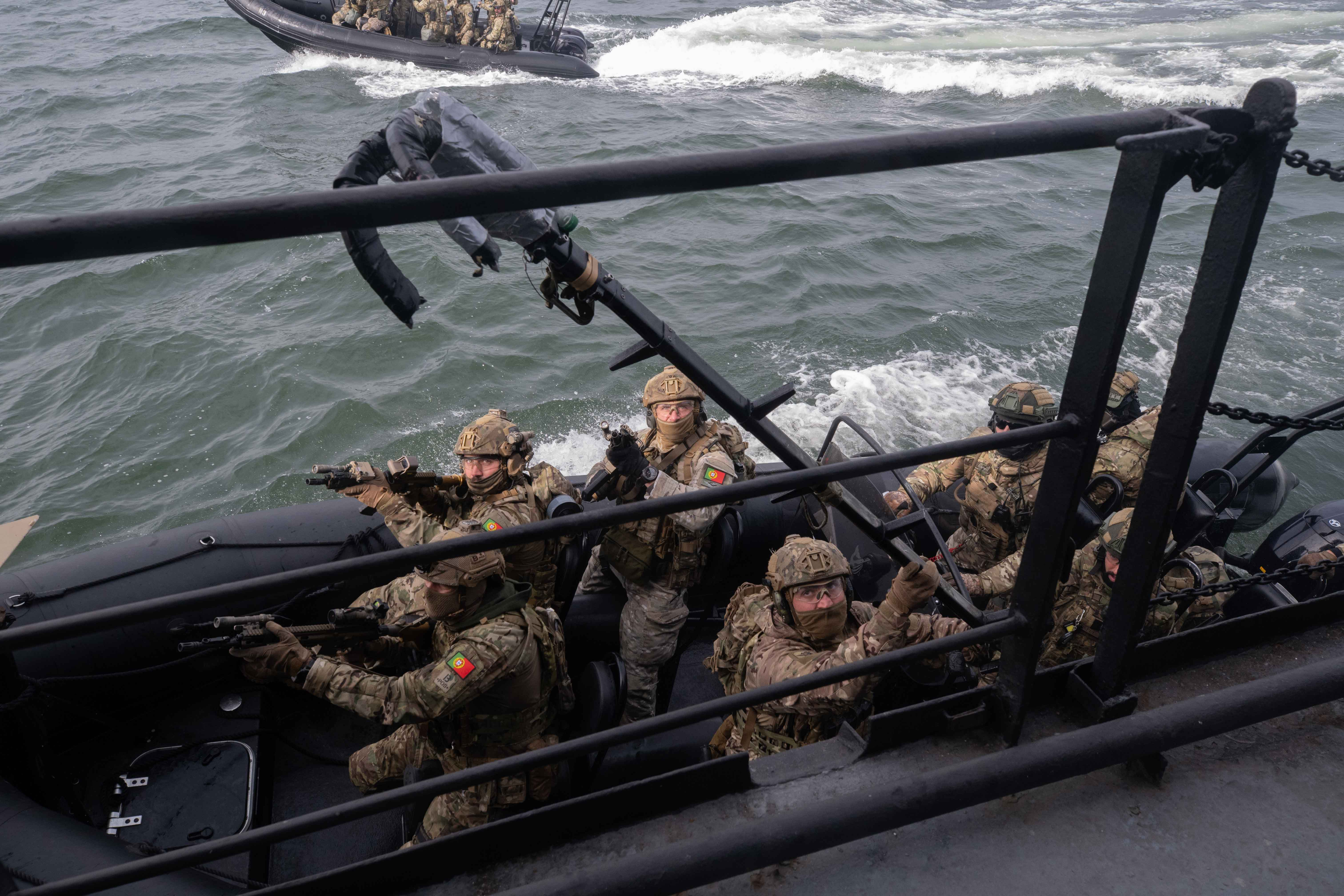
Special Actions Detachment during Trojan Footprint 2024 in Black Sea

DAE conducts regular training exercises with its NATO counterparts, including the United States Navy SEALs, Spanish Fuerza de Guerra Naval Especial, French Commandos Marine, Polish JW GROM, Lithuanian Special Operations Force as well as the respective naval counter-terrorist units.

They were deployed to:

- Angola in 1992;
- Zaire in 1997;
- Guinea-Bissau in 1998;
- East Timor in 2004;
- Democratic Republic of Congo in 2006 (as part of the EUFOR);
- Somalia in 2009;
- Afghanistan in 2013;
- Mali in 2019;
- Lithuania from (2018–2024) (as part of the NATO Assurance Measures)

== Equipment ==
=== Infantry weapons ===
==== Pistols ====
- Glock 17 Gen 5 9-mm pistol

==== Submachine guns ====
- Brügger & Thomet MP9
- Heckler & Koch MP5A3/A5 with Aimpoint CompM4 red dot sight's

==== Assault rifles ====
- Heckler & Koch G36C/K 5.56mm
- Heckler & Koch HK416 A5 5.56mm
- M4 carbine with M203 40 mm grenade launcher

==== Sniper rifles ====
- Heckler & Koch HK417 A2 7.62mm sniper variant
- AW 7.62mm sniper rifle
- AWSM .338 LM sniper rifle
- AW50 12.7mm sniper rifle

==== Grenade launchers ====
- Heckler & Koch AG36 used on H&K G36 rifles
- M203 used on M4 carbine

=== Vehicles ===
- Can-Am Traxter HD8
- Mercedes-Benz 24 GD
- Toyota Land Cruiser HZJ73
- Land Rover Defender 90
