= FBP submachine gun =

FBP
- FBP m/948
- Type: Submachine gun
- Place of origin: Portugal

Service history
- In service: 1948-1980s
- Used by: See Users
- Wars: Portuguese Colonial War East Timorese civil war Indonesian occupation of East Timor

Production history
- Designer: Major Francisco Gonçalves Cardoso
- Designed: 1948 (production model)
- Manufacturer: Fábrica de Braço de Prata (FBP)
- Produced: 1948-1955 (FBP m/948); 1961-1980 (later models)
- Variants: m/948, m/963 and m/976

Specifications
- Mass: 3.77 kg (8.31 lb)
- Length: 807 mm (31.8 in)
- Cartridge: 9×19mm Parabellum
- Action: Blowback
- Rate of fire: 500 rounds/min
- Muzzle velocity: 390 m/s (1,280 ft/s)
- Feed system: 21, 32-round box magazine
- Sights: Iron

FBP is a 9 mm submachine gun originally developed from a design first conceived in 1940 by Francisco Gonçalves Cardoso, an officer of artillery in the Portuguese Army. The onset of World War II halted development of the weapon, which was further modified and put into production in 1948.

== History ==
The submachine gun was produced by the Fábrica de Braço de Prata weapon factory at Lisbon, whose initials FBP gave the name to the weapon, adopted for service as the m/948 in 1948. It utilized the large bolt and telescoping operating spring of the German MP40 submachine gun, and the collapsible wire stock of the American M3 submachine gun. Unusual for submachine guns, the m/948 was fitted with a barrel sleeve with a mount to accept the standard Portuguese Mauser bayonet.

The original version of the submachine gun (the FBP m/948) only allowed for fully automatic fire. An upgraded version (designated FBP m/963) introduced in 1961 also allowed for semi-automatic fire.

The weapon was primarily issued to officers and NCOs in the Portuguese Armed Forces and security forces, along with quantities of ex-German MP 34 submachine guns. In Portuguese service it was used in combat in Angola, Portuguese Guinea, Mozambique, Portuguese India and Portuguese Timor. It was eventually replaced in service by the 9 mm Uzi and the collapsible-stock version of the standard m/961 G3 rifle.

In 1976 Fábrica Militar de Braço de Prata, led by Major Engenheiro Mário Tavares, developed a modernized version of the FBP with a barrel cooling sleeve, but it never entered production.

== Users ==
- Angola
- East Timor: Used by the FALINTIL, some were inherited by Timor-Leste Defence Force.
- Portugal

== See also ==
- Hafdasa C-4
- Halcon M-1943
- Sola Super
- List of weapons of the Portuguese Colonial War
- Portuguese Colonial Wars

== Bibliography ==
- Alejandro de Quesada, MP 38 and MP 40 Submachine Guns, Weapon series 31, Osprey Publishing Ltd, Oxford 2014. ISBN 978 1 78096 388 4
- António José Telo and Mário Álvares, Armamento do Exército Português Vol. I – Armamento ligeiro, Prefácio, Lisbon 2004. ISBN 972-8816-43-X (in Portuguese)
- Peter Abbott, Manuel Ribeiro Rodrigues and Ron Volstad, Modern African Wars (2): Angola and Mozambique 1961–74, Men-at-Arms series 202, Osprey Publishing Ltd, London 1988. ISBN 0-85045-843-9
