= Sappers Divers Group =

Portuguese Navy's diving unit

Divers Group
- Agrupamento de Mergulhadores
- Active: 1966 (sappers divers sections); 1973 (sappers divers detachments); 2004 (Divers Group)
- Country: Portugal
- Branch: Portuguese Navy
- Type: Clearance diver
- Part of: Subsurface Squadron
- Base: Lisbon Naval Base
- Nickname: AGRUMERG
- Motto: IN AQUA OPTIMI
- Engagements: Portuguese Overseas War (1961-1974); SNMCMG1; Hintze Ribeiro Bridge disaster (2001); NATO Assurance Measures - Lithuania

Commanders
- Current commander: Commander (Capitão de Fragata)

The Divers Group (AGRUMERG, Portuguese: Agrupamento de Mergulhadores) is the Portuguese Navy's sapper clearance diver unit. It was created in 2004 through the grouping of the several already existing diving subunits, to exercise administrative, logistical and operational control and management, maritime special operations capable, over all diver units and personnel. It groups under a single command, all previously existing Sappers Divers Units (EOD/Combat Divers, Salvage/SAR, MCM/MW) and Services (Training and Logistics).

== Organization ==
The Divers Group is a command, within the Portuguese Navy Subsurface Squadron, and is commanded by a senior naval officer. It includes:

- Commander
- Operations Cell
- Diving Service (Serviço de Mergulho) - Logistics
- Divers School (Escola de Mergulhadores) - Training
- Sappers Divers Detachment No. 1 (Destacamento de Mergulhadores Sapadores N.º1 - DMS1) - EOD / Combat Divers
- Sappers Divers Detachment No. 2 (Destacamento de Mergulhadores Sapadores N.º2 - DMS2) - Salvage / SAR
- Sappers Divers Detachment No. 3 (Destacamento de Mergulhadores Sapadores N.º3 - DMS3) - Mine countermeasures / Mine warfare

== History ==
The first notice of the employment of combat divers by Portugal occurred in 1580, during the War of the Portuguese Succession. In that occasion, Portuguese combat divers attacked the enemy Spanish ships that were in the Tagus, in order to damage their hulls.

In the scope of the Overseas war in Portuguese Guinea, the Portuguese Navy detected the use of naval mines by the enemy forces of the PAIGC. To deal with that threat, in 1966, the No. 1 Sappers Divers Section was created and deployed to Guinea. In 1968, the No. 2 Sappers Divers Section is also created.

In 1972, the two sappers divers sections are transformed in two larger sappers divers detachments (DMS, destacamentos de mergulhadores sapadores). The DMS continue to be assigned to the Navy's Guinea Maritime Defense Command due to the operational imperatives of its activities.

The DMS were disbanded in 1975, after the end of the Overseas War. Afterwards the operational activity of the divers was assigned to the Navy's Divers School.

The Sappers Divers Detachment No. 1 (DMS1) was reactivated on 1 June, 1988, because there was a need of an operational unit specially dedicated to the military diving area. Public interest activities, namely salvage diving and air-sea rescue were still assigned to the Divers School.

When, on 1 January, 1995, the DMS2 was reactivated (with twenty elements instead of thirteen), all operational activity was assigned to the detachments, with Divers School becoming only dedicated to the instruction activities.

In 2004, the Sappers Divers Group is created, grouping the DMS1, the DMS2 and the Divers School under a single Command.

A divers unit focused in mine warfare was created in 2008, this being the Sappers Divers Detachment No. 3 (DMS-MW).

The Sappers Divers Group is under the command of the Portuguese Navy Submarine Squadron.

== Missions ==
The missions assigned to the Sappers Divers Detachments, under the Divers Group command, are:

- Air-sea rescue.
- CBRNE consequence management.
- Co-operation in the control of activities linked to the seabed.
- Co-operation in the scientific study of the sea.
- Defusing and disposal of bombs, IED, land mines, naval mine, and unexploded ordnance.
- Maritime military operations.
- Maritime military logistics operations management.
- Military and civilian underwater search and recovery.
- Military engineering operations.
- Naval mine warfare operations.
- NBCR on operations in contaminated environments.
- Route clearance operations search and destroy IEDs.
- Salvage diving operations, namely survey, repair and recuperation of naval units.
- Support Special Actions Detachment (Destacamento de Ações Especiais : DAE) operations.
- Tactical coastal reconnaissance and obstacle clearing for the landing of amphibious forces.
- Underwater defensive and offensive operations, at sea, in the shoreline, in river access, and in port facilities, against enemy positions and naval assets.

High-profile operations conducted by the unit:

- Inspection of the Metro tunnel in Praça do Comércio.
- Salvage of the bodies of victims of the Hintze Ribeiro Bridge collapse in 2001.
- Exercises of amphibious operations in the CONTEX national exercises.
- The recent certification for deep diving up to 81 meters.
- SNMCMG1.
