= EMPORDEF =

Defunct Portuguese holding company

EMPORDEF, SGPS, SA (Portuguese: Empresa Portuguesa de Defesa, Portuguese Defense Company) was a holding company, created in March 1997, owned by the Portuguese government which managed other companies directly or indirectly connected to the defense sector, such as telecommunications, information technology, engineering, aeronautical construction and shipbuilding. In January, 2020, it was announced that the Portuguese government had completed the liquidation of the company. The remainder of its assets were transferred to idD - Plataforma das Indústrias de Defesa Nacionais.

== Participated companies ==
- OGMA (35% ownership) - Aeronautical industry.
- IDD (100%) - Demilitarization of defense materiel.
- EMPORDEF-TI (100%) - Simulation, training, test and maintenance support systems.
- EID (38.57%) - Communication systems.
- Edisoft (17.5%) - Weapon control, information integration, military logistics, collective security and space systems.
- DEFAERLOC (100%) - C-295 leasing company
- DEFLOC (81%) - EH-101 leasing company
- Naval Rocha (45%) - Shipbuilding industry.
- Arsenal do Alfeite (100%) - Shipbuilding industry.
- OGMA Imobiliária, S.A. (100%) - Real estate.
- EEN (100%) - Naval engineering.
- Ribeira d’Atalaia – Sociedade Imobiliária, S.A. (57%) - Real estate.
- ENVC (100%) - Shipbuilding industry.
- INDEP (100%) - Weapons and ammunition.

== See also ==
- Portuguese Armed Forces
- Portuguese Air Force
- European Defence Agency
- European Space Agency
- Leasing
- Offset agreement
- Foreign Military Sales
- Portuguese Pandur
- Critical Software
- Rohde & Schwarz
