= Heckler & Koch HK21 =

German general-purpose machine gun (1961)

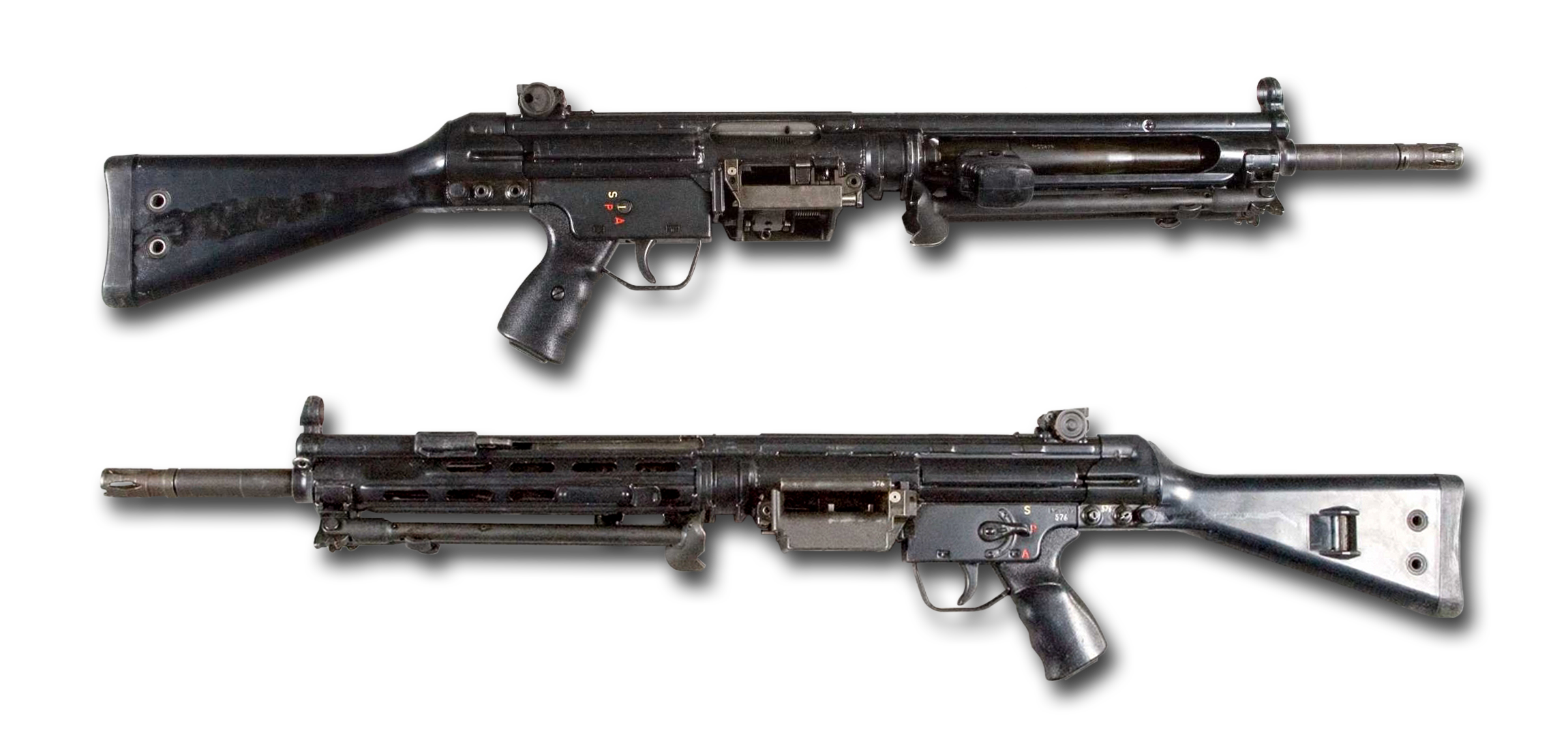
- HK21A1 general-purpose machine gun
- Type: General-purpose machine gun (HK21); Light machine gun (HK23); Heavy machine gun (HK25)
- Place of origin: West Germany

Service history
- In service: 1961–present
- Used by: See Users
- Wars: Vietnam War; Football War; Lebanese Civil War; Portuguese Colonial War; Shaba II; South African Border War; Kurdish–Turkish conflict; Salvadoran Civil War; Operation Eagle Claw; Sri Lankan Civil War; Armed conflict for control of the favelas; Boko Haram insurgency

Production history
- Designer: Heckler & Koch
- Designed: 1961
- Manufacturer: Heckler & Koch; Fábrica de Braço de Prata; SEDENA
- Produced: 1961–1990
- Variants: See Variants

Specifications
- Mass: HK21: 7.92 kg (17.46 lb); HK21A1: 8.30 kg (18.3 lb); HK11A1: 7.70 kg (17.0 lb); HK21E: 9.30 kg (20.5 lb); HK11E: 8.15 kg (18.0 lb); HK23E: 8.75 kg (19.3 lb); HK13E: 8 kg (18 lb); HK25: 16.30 kg (35.9 lb)
- Length: HK21: 1,021 mm (40.2 in); HK21A1, HK11A1, HK11E, HK23E, HK13E: 1,030 mm (40.6 in); HK21E: 1,140 mm (44.9 in); HK25: 1,400 mm (55.1 in)
- Barrel length: HK21, HK21A1, HK11A1, HK11E, HK23E, HK13E: 450 mm (17.7 in); HK21E: 560 mm (22.0 in); HK25: 900 mm (35.4 in)
- Cartridge: HK21, HK21A1, HK11A1, HK21E, HK11E: 7.62×51mm NATO; HK23E, HK13E: 5.56×45mm NATO; HK25: 12.7×99mm NATO
- Action: Roller-delayed blowback, closed bolt
- Rate of fire: HK21, HK21A1: 900 rounds/min HK11A1, HK21E, HK11E: 800 rounds/min HK23E, HK13E: 750 rounds/min HK25: 450 rounds/min
- Muzzle velocity: HK21, HK21A1, HK11A1, HK11E: 800 m/s (2,625 ft/s); HK21E: 840 m/s (2,756 ft/s); HK23E, HK13E: 910 m/s (2,986 ft/s) (using the SS109 cartridge); HK25: 915 m/s (3,002 ft/s)
- Effective firing range: 100–1,200 m (109–1,312 yd) sight adjustments
- Feed system: M13, DM6, DM1 ammunition belt, 20-round detachable box or 50-round drum magazine (from the G3). An 80-round drum magazine or even a 100-round drum magazine was also available (No longer manufactured)
- Sights: Rear rotary diopter drum; hooded front post

The Heckler & Koch HK21 is a German 7.62×51mm NATO general-purpose machine gun, developed in 1961 by small arms manufacturer Heckler & Koch and based on the HK G3 battle rifle. The machine gun is in use with the armed forces of several Asian, African and Latin American countries. It was also license-manufactured by Fábrica de Braço de Prata in Portugal as the m/968 and in Mexico by SEDENA as the MG21. In the German military (Bundeswehr) and the federal police (Bundespolizei) it is designated "G8".

== Design details ==
=== Operating mechanism ===
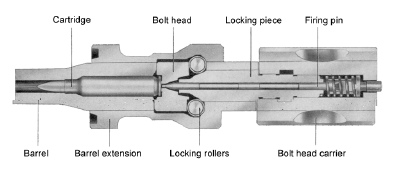
A schematic of the Heckler & Koch roller-delayed blowback mechanism

The HK21 is a selective fire roller-delayed blowback-operated firearm with a semi-rigid locking mechanism designed to retard the rearward movement of the bolt. This delay was achieved by artificially increasing the inertia of the bolt by using an angular, interposed transmission system, installed symmetrically to the bore axis, with two cylindrical rollers acting as transmission elements against a movable locking piece which drives the heavy bolt carrier. The two-piece bolt assembly consists of a bolt head, which contains the aforementioned rollers, and a supporting locking piece and bolt carrier. During the "unlocking" sequence, the bolt head receives the recoil impulse from the ignited cartridge and exerts rearward pressure against the rollers, seated in recesses in the barrel extension. The rollers are driven inward against angled ramps of the barrel extension and interact with the wedge-shaped locking piece, projecting it backwards. Thus a chambering dependent (4:1 for 7.62×51mm NATO) or (3:1 for 5.56×45mm NATO) transmission ratio is maintained (as long as the rollers move on the inclined surfaces of the barrel extension and locking piece) of the bolt carrier and locking piece relative to the bolt head; the bolt head carrier travels backwards significantly faster than the bolt head, ensuring a safe drop of pressure within the barrel prior to extraction. Since extraction is carried-out under relatively high pressure, the barrel's chamber received a series of flutes designed to help free the bloated cartridge casing from the chamber wall. Like the G3 and HK33 assault rifle bolts the HK21 bolt features an anti-bounce mechanism that prevents the bolt from bouncing off the barrel's breech surface. The "bolt head locking lever" is a spring-loaded claw mounted on the bolt carrier that grabs the bolt head as the bolt carrier group goes into battery. The lever essentially ratchets into place with friction, providing enough resistance to being re-opened that the bolt carrier does not rebound. The spring-powered claw extractor is also contained inside the bolt while the lever ejector is located inside the trigger housing (actuated by the recoiling bolt).

The reliable functioning of roller-delayed blowback mechanisms is limited by specific ammunition and arm parameters like bullet weight, propellant charge, barrel length and amount of wear. For obtaining a proper and safe functioning parameters bandwidth Heckler & Koch offer a variety of locking pieces with different mass and shoulder angles. The angles are critical and determine the unlock timing and pressure curve progression as the locking pieces act in unison with the bolt head carrier.

=== Features ===
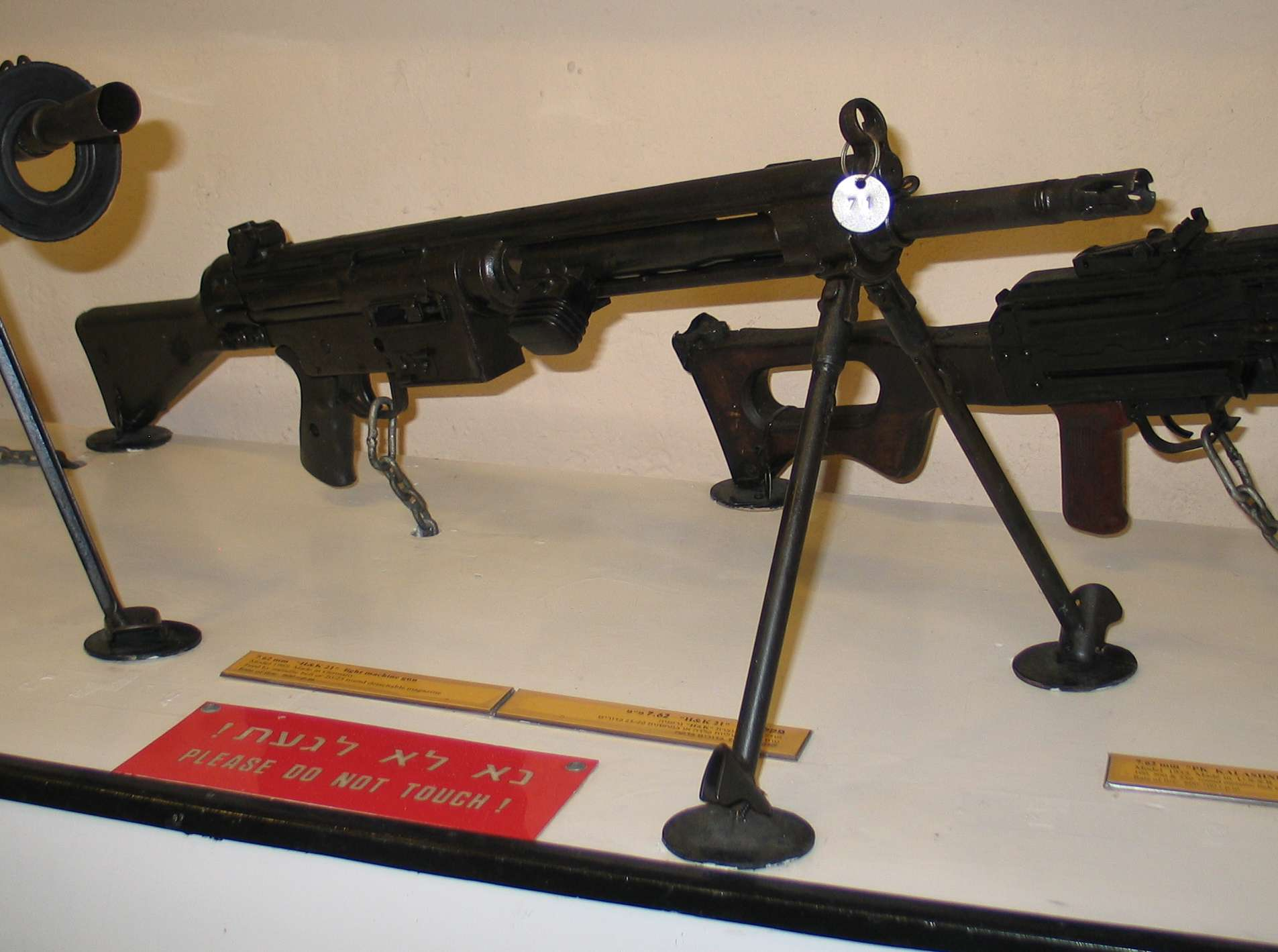
HK21 with a bipod positioned at the front for maximum stability

The HK21 uses a modified G3 receiver that has been extended to the front sight base. It can be equipped with a detachable bipod (mounted either in front of the feed mechanism or at the muzzle), a tripod, or configured for vehicle mounts. The HK21 has close to a 48% parts interchangeability with the G3. The bolt features a spring-powered extractor and an anti-bounce device that prevents the bolt head from glancing off the barrel extension upon forward return of the locking assembly. The lever-type ejector system is contained in the trigger group housing and is actuated with every shot by the recoiling bolt. The machine gun has a hammer striker and is fired from the closed bolt position, rare for general purpose machine guns. Firing from a closed bolt contributes to accurate fire, but is disadvantageous for heat dissipation. The trigger group, which is integrated with the pistol grip and hinged from the receiver, is equipped with a fire control selector switch (selector lever in the "E" or "1" position – semi-automatic fire, "F" or "20" – continuous fire mode) that doubles as a manual safety (rotating the lever into the "S" or "0" setting disables the trigger, machine gun is considered "safe").

The HK21 has a free-floating, heavy, quick-change barrel fitted with a slotted flash suppressor. The firearm is equipped with an iron sight line that consist of a rotary rear drum and hooded front post. The rear aperture sight is mechanically adjustable for both windage and elevation from 100 to 1,200 m (109 to 1,312 yd) in 100 m (109 yd) increments for 7.62×51mm NATO models or 100 to 1,000 m (109 to 1,094 yd) in 100 m (109 yd) increments for 5.56×45mm NATO models.

By simply swapping out several components such as the barrel, bolt and feed plate unit, the machine gun can be quickly converted to the intermediate 7.62×39mm and 5.56×45mm NATO chamberings.

=== Feeding ===
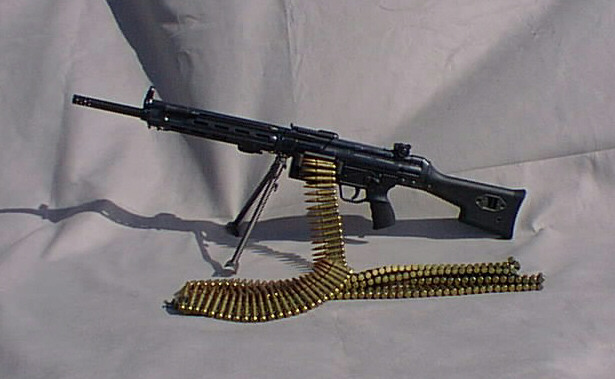
HK21 with ammunition belts and bipod mounted at the rear to align with its point of balance

The machine gun feeds from the left-hand side through a variety of disintegrating metallic link ammunition belt types: the American M13 linked belt, the German DM6 counterpart to the M13 or the German non-disintegrating metallic link DM1 belt. The ratcheting wheel feed unit was designed as an easily removable module that is inserted into the bottom portion of the feed block (installed in place of the standard magazine well), below the barrel axis. As a result of this configuration (the bolt passes over the belt), the ammunition belt is aligned upside down compared to most other belt-fed machine guns (that is, the links face downward). The feed mechanism is actuated by the reciprocating movement of the bolt; a curved cam slot on the bottom of the bolt engages an actuator in the feed mechanism, rotating the double sprockets and positioning a new round in the feed path. Simple conversion from belt to magazine feed is possible by installing an adapter in the feed block which enables the use of H&K's proprietary 20-round box magazine (from the G3 rifle) or a 50-round drum magazine.

== Variants ==
=== HK21A1 ===
In the early 1970s the HK21's design was simplified and the feed mechanism was modified. The machine gun's weight was increased, a carrying handle and a hooked buttstock with improved buffer mechanism were also added. The barrels were internally revised to polygonal rifling. Since then, the HK21 was offered in two main variants: the HK21A1 general-purpose machine gun (with a different belt feed mechanism) and the HK11A1 light machine gun. (optimized for magazine feed only). The HK11A1 proved more successful in export sales and was adopted by the Hellenic Army and several African and Asian armies. Both machine guns, as in the original HK21, can be converted to chamber the 5.56×45mm NATO round by replacing the appropriate components.

=== HK21E ===
During the 1980s both the HK21A1 and HK11A1 were modernized based on user and testing feedback, resulting in a new modular family of machine guns that share the same receiver, trigger group and interchangeable barrels and feed units, consisting of:

- HK11E light machine gun (magazine fed, chambered in 7.62×51mm NATO)
- HK13E light machine gun (magazine fed, chambered in 5.56×45mm NATO)
- HK21E general-purpose machine gun (belt-fed, 7.62×51mm NATO)

The "E" simply stands for "Export" model. They use STANAG rather than HK proprietary magazines and come with different optics than German military models.

The "E model" is a thoroughly revised variant aimed to improve the reliability, efficiency and service life of the HK21. For this the length of the receiver was increased by 25 mm (1.0 in) to provide additional recoil length for the bolt group. The recoil reduction improved accuracy of fire. Reinforcing bars were added to the receiver to provide additional strength and a guaranteed 60,000 rounds minimum service life. The bolt head, extractor and locking roller holder were completely redesigned as were the bolt carrier and recoil spring assembly, belt feed unit, buffer, barrel and trigger group. The redesigned belt feed mechanism transports the ammunition belt in two steps reducing stress on the feed and ammunition belt.

Compared to the older HK21A1 and HK11A1, the modernized "Export" machine guns also feature a longer barrel shroud, extended by 94 mm (3.7 in) towards the front, which also resulted in a longer sight radius; the barrel extension was modified (the HK21E also received a longer barrel); a burst fire mode was incorporated into the trigger group as the fourth selector setting (3-round burst); a polymer barrel handle was added; space for a cleaning kit was added in the grip; the rear sight was modified with an adjustable drum; a bipod with a 3-position height adjustment and 30-degree tilt mechanisms replaced the simple folding bipod; the feed mechanism was modified to provide continuous feeding (by moving the belt in two stages, during both forward and rear movement of the bolt), a forward assist for silent loading was provided and the machine guns were adapted to use NATO-standard optical sight mounts.

When employed in the light machine gun (infantry assault) role, the HK21E stores its ammunition belt in a 100-round sheet metal container, fastened to the bottom of the feed mechanism (as in the HK21A1). The ability to use Heckler & Koch G3 or STANAG (for HK23E) box or drum magazines is available with an optional feed module kit that consists of the bolt, recoil spring and belt feed module or magazine well. When employed in the belt-fed medium machine gun (fire support) role the HK21E provides a cook-off rate in excess of 1,000 rounds fired in quick succession. The shock-absorbing tripod weighs 10.5 kg (23.1 lb).

=== HK23 ===
The HK23 is a belt-fed light machine gun variant, chambered in 5.56×45mm NATO cartridge.

The HK23A1 is an improved variant, and Heckler & Koch's response to changing requirements in the U.S. Army's SAW program in the mid-1970s.

The HK23E is a further developed and modernised export variant.

=== G8 and G8A1 ===
The German Army, German Navy and the German Federal Police use a variant of the HK11 designated the Gewehr-8 (or G8). It is tapped for telescopic sights and has a quick-change barrel with a bipod that uses either a heavy match-grade bull-barrel or a heavy barrel for automatic fire. It was designed to use G3-type 10- or 20-round box magazines in the designated marksman role, but could also use a special 50-round drum magazine for sustained supporting or suppressing fire. The modified G8A1 adopted the improvements of the HK11A1 series and was only able to feed from magazines and drums.

=== GR-series ===
The GR-series were "sanitized" prototypes (i.e., having no serial numbers or identifying marks) used by special operations forces. The GR-6 and GR-9 differed from the stock machine guns by having an integrated optical sight, no provisions for iron sights, and came standard in Woodland (-C suffix) or Desert (-S suffix) camouflage.

- GR-6 Automatic Rifle (HK13).
- GR-9 Light Machinegun (HK23).

=== HK25 ===
A heavy machine gun prototype of the HK21 chambered in .50 BMG (12.7×99mm NATO) was proposed but never went into production.

=== HK51B ===
An aftermarket conversion of an HK21 general purpose machinegun into a belt-fed short carbine created by gunsmiths F. J. Vollmer & Company Inc. The barrel is 8.9 inches long, has an overall length of 21 inches, weighs about 11 lbs. unloaded, and has a rate of fire of 950 to 1,000 rounds per minute. Fixed barrel models have a "Tropical" MP5-style handguard with ventilation slots. Quick-change barrel models have a four-position Picatinny Rail handguard (usually used with a vertical foregrip). It feeds from a 100-round HK21 belt box and uses either the American M13 or German DM6 disintegrating link belt. Vollmer only made 30 guns, 2 of which had quick-change barrels.

== Gallery ==
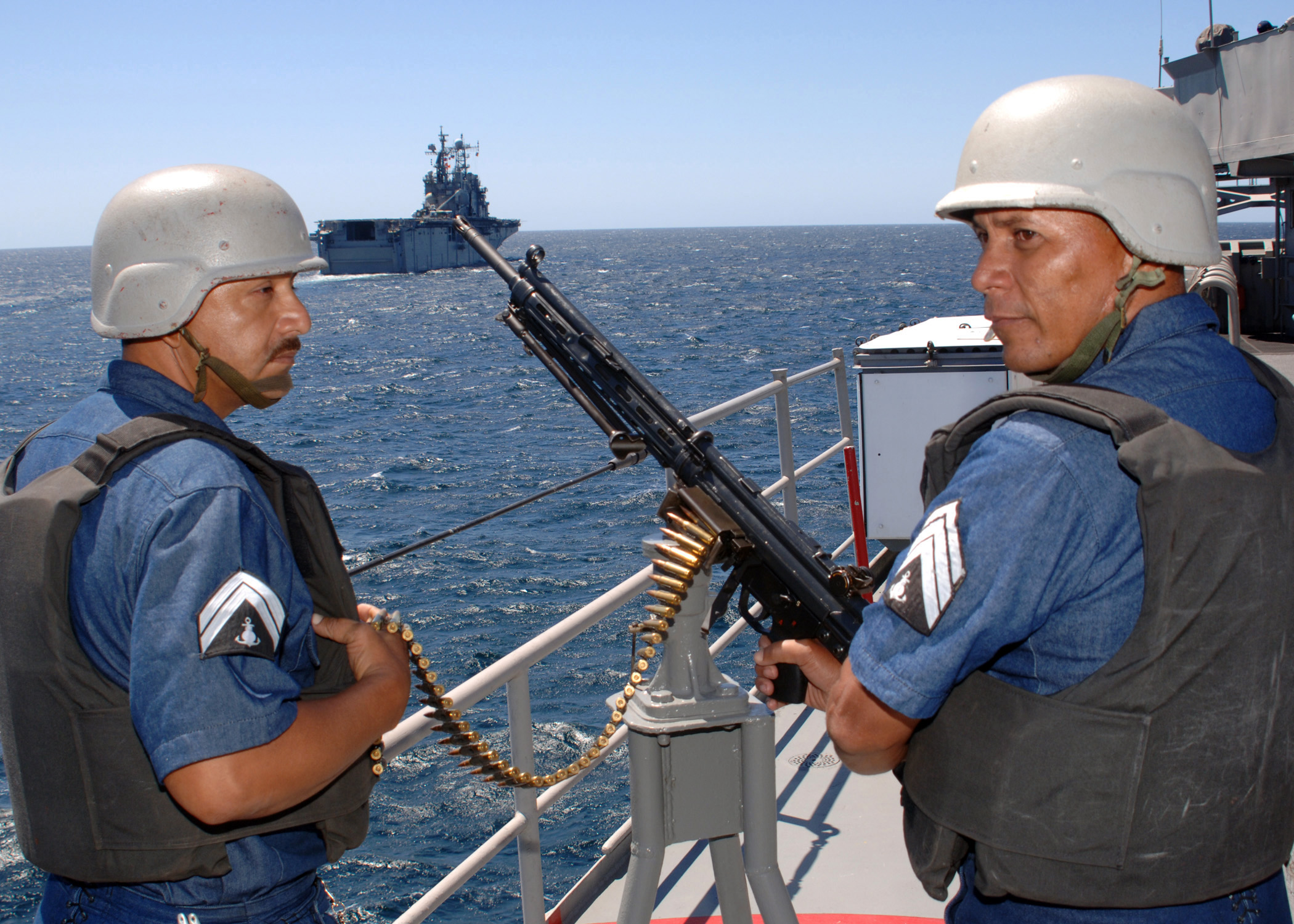
Mexican navy gunners prepare to fire an HK21

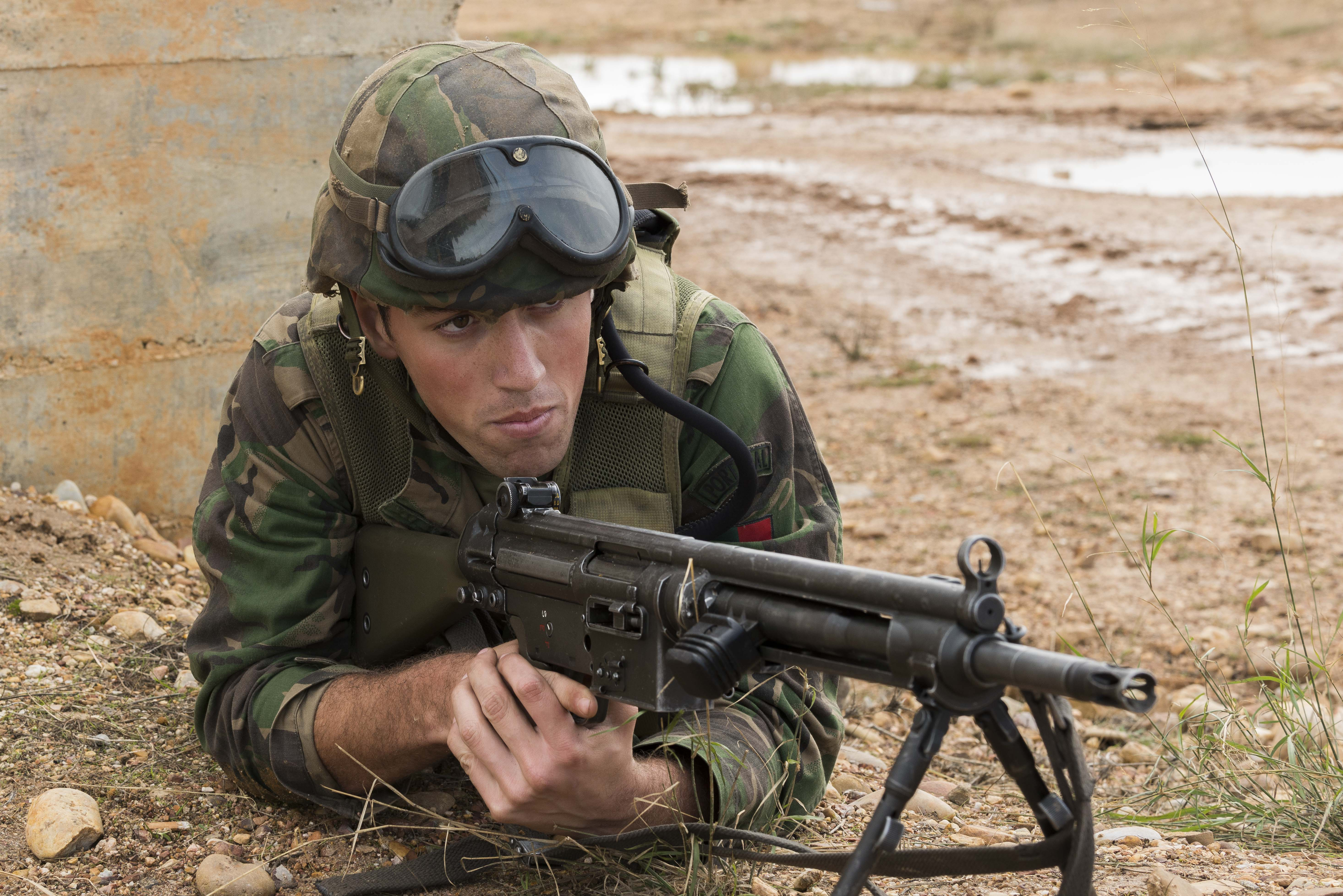
Portuguese soldier with an HK21

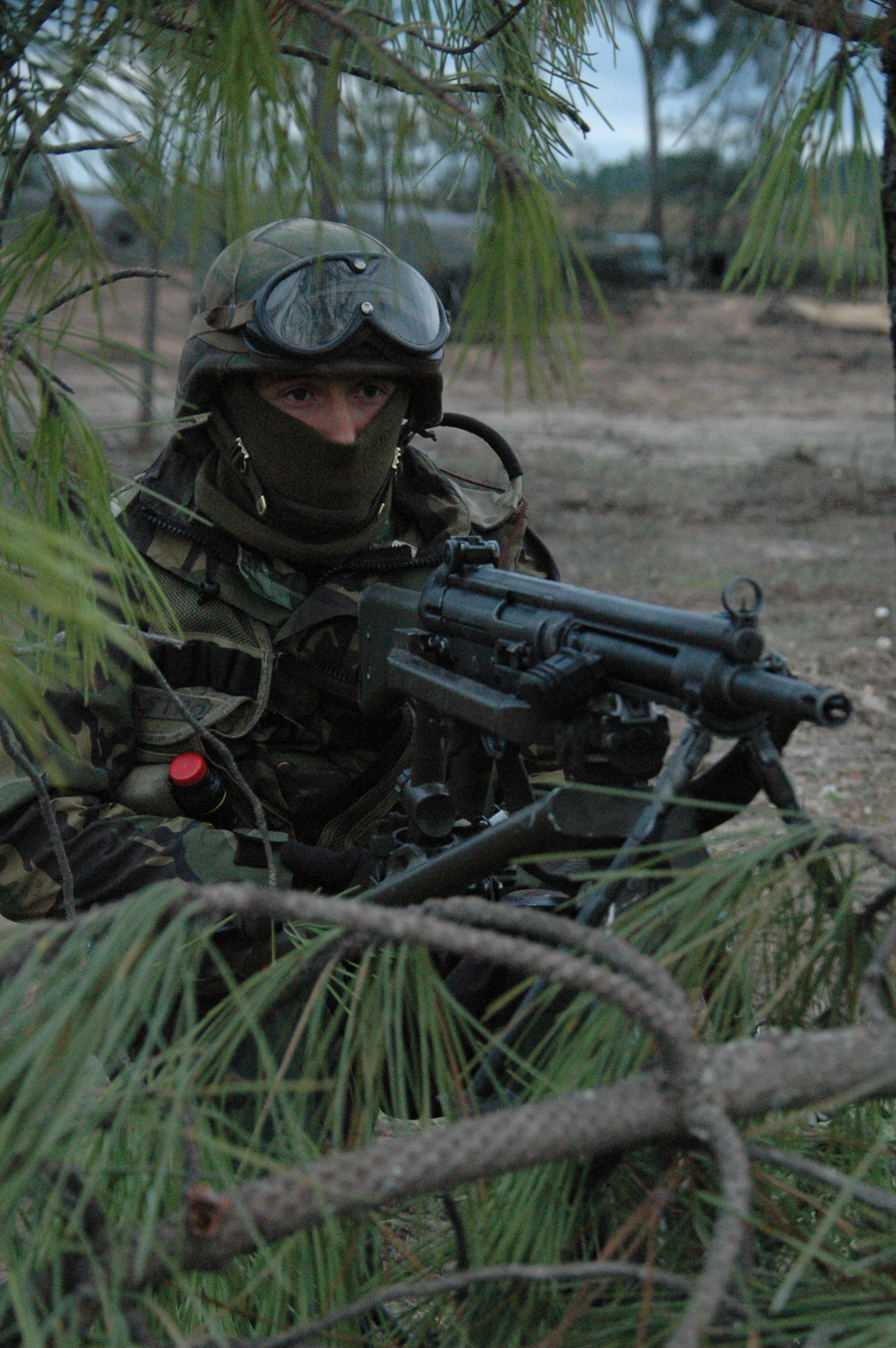
A Portuguese HK21 on a tripod

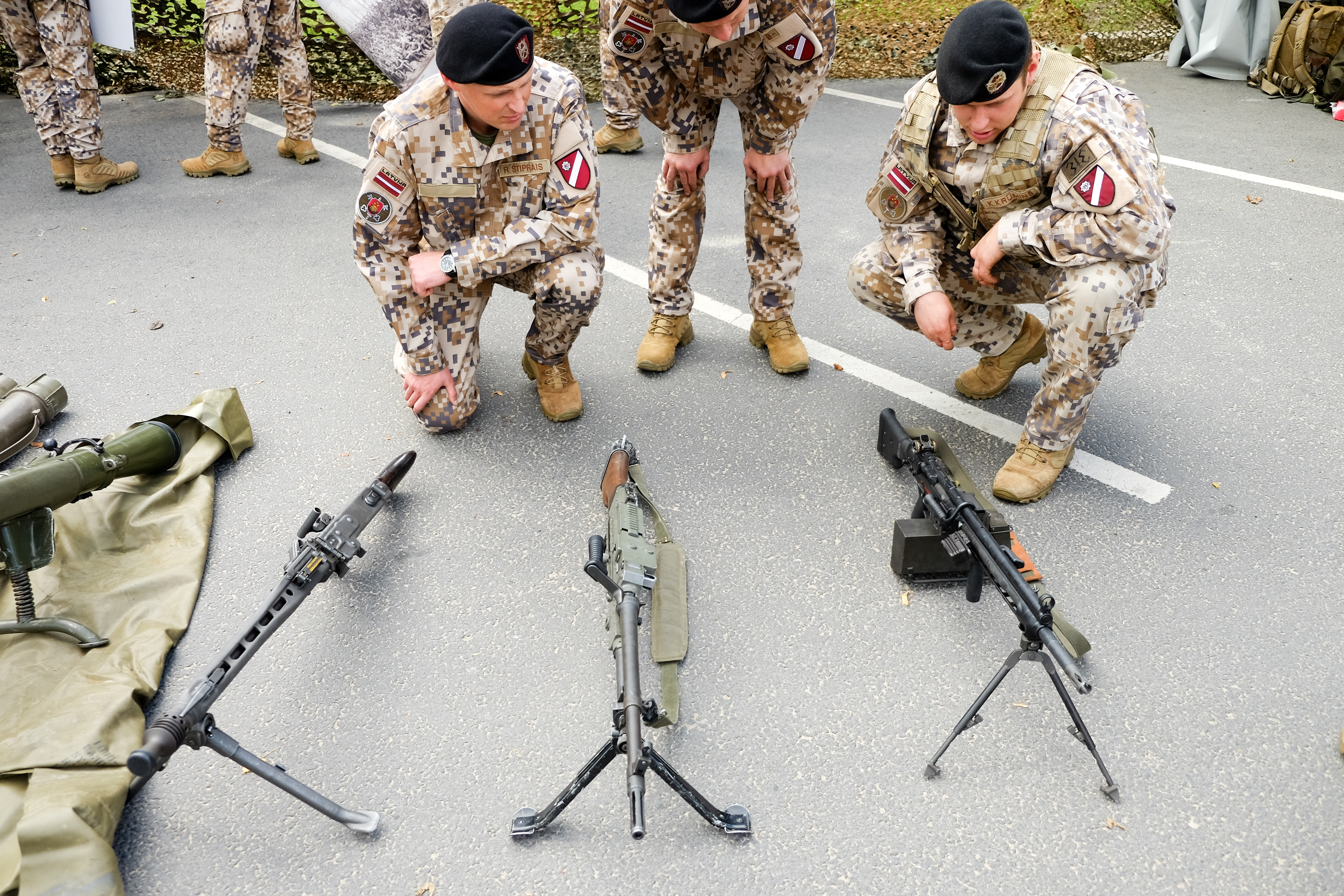
Latvian soldiers with (left to right) MG 3, FN MAG and HK21 general-purpose machine guns

== Users ==
- Argentina: HK23E variant used by Comandos Anfibios
- Bangladesh: HK11A1 and HK21A1 variants.
- Brazil: HK21E variant issued to special forces, HK21A1 variant in use by BOPE
- Bolivia
- Brunei: HK21A1 variant.
- Cameroon: HK21 variant.
- Croatia: HK21A1 variant
- Cyprus
- Ecuador
- El Salvador
- Germany
- Greece: HK11A1 variant. Made under license.
- Jordan: HK21E variant.
- Kenya: HK21A1 variant.
- Latvia: HK21E variant issued to Zemessardze National Guard units.
- Malaysia: HK11A1 and HK21E variants employed by the Royal Malaysia Police and Malaysian Army during Communist Insurgency War..
- Mauritius: HK21E1 variant.
- Mexico: HK21A1 and HK21E variant. Made under license.
- Niger: HK11 and HK21 variants.
- Nigeria: HK21 variant.
- Paraguay: HK21 variant.
- Peru
- Qatar: HK21 variant.
- Senegal: HK21 variant.
- Sri Lanka: HK11 and HK21 variants.
- South Africa: HK21 variant used by 32nd Battalion during South African Border War.
- Sudan: HK21 variant.
- Sweden Trials for Home Guard only.
- Thailand
- Turkey: HK23E variant is employed by the Turkish Gendarmerie.
- Uganda
- United Arab Emirates: HK23E variant.
- United States: HK21 was used by the Navy SEALs Post Vietnam war. While trialed in the early 1970s SAW trials it was not adopted by the US Navy until the formation of SEAL team 6 in the 1980s. It was also used by the Delta Force in Operation Eagle Claw.

=== Former users ===
- Portugal: HK21E variant, made under license Replaced in 2019 by 5.56×45mm FN Minimi Mk3 machine guns.
