= Lusa (village) =

Village in Mirzapur, Uttar Pradesh, India

Coordinates: 24°53′N 82°49′E

Lusa is a village in Mirzapur, Uttar Pradesh, India.
