= OGMA =

Portuguese aerospace company

OGMA - Indústria Aeronáutica de Portugal, S.A.
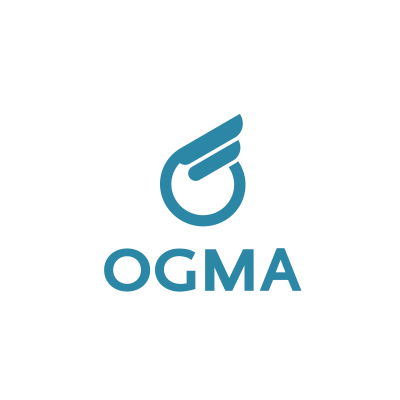
- Industry: Aerospace
- Founded: June 29, 1918; 107 years ago
- Headquarters: Alverca, Portugal
- Key people: Paulo Monginho (CEO)
- Products: Aircraft maintenance and manufacturing
- Parent: Embraer
- Website: www.ogma.pt/en/

OGMA – Indústria Aeronáutica de Portugal S.A. is a Portuguese aerospace company focused on aircraft maintenance and manufacturing. Embraer has a majority stake in the company with 65% of shares, while the remaining 35% is controlled by the government of Portugal. The company has serviced approximately 40 clients from 70 countries.

== History ==
OGMA was founded as part of the reorganisation of the Portuguese Army's Aeronautic Service on June 29, 1918, under the name Parque de Material Aeronáutico (Aeronautics Material Depot), and was responsible for storing, repairing, manufacturing, and providing aeronautical material. In addition, OGMA provided training to military aeronautics personnel. Ten years later it was renamed Oficinas Gerais de Material Aeronáutico (General Workshops of Aeronautical Material). In 1994, the company was renamed OGMA - Indústria Aeronáutica de Portugal S.A.

OGMA began manufacturing the Caudron G-3 aircraft in 1922. This was followed by the manufacture, under English licence, of the Vickers Valparaiso in 1933, the Avro 626 and de Havilland Tiger Moth aircraft in 1938, and the construction of 66 DHC-1 Chipmunks in 1952. Three years later, OGMA signed its first contract with the United States Navy. In 1959, it signed a contract with the US Air Force. In 1972, OGMA signed a manufacturing contract with Eurocopter Group. Throughout the 1970s, the company performed maintenance on C-130 Hercules, P-3 Orion and SA 300 Puma aircraft.

== Operations ==
In 1993, OGMA became a Rolls-Royce Authorised Maintenance Center for the T56, AE 2100 and AE 3007A engines and, five years later, became an Authorised Maintenance Center for Embraer ERJ 145 aircraft. Since 1994 OGMA has manufactured most of the Pilatus PC-12's major structural components, including fuselage, wings, cargo and passenger doors, flaps, ailerons, rudder and wiring harnesses.

In 2001, the company was contracted for repairs and modifications to 40 F-16 aircraft belonging to the Portuguese Air Force. In 2004, OGMA was privatised, and its ownership distributed between Embraer and EMPORDEF. On July 10, 2006, OGMA inaugurated the Executive Jets Center, created to improve the maintenance services of the Embraer Legacy 600 and future business jets developed by Embraer.

Since 2013, OGMA has been involved in the Embraer C-390 Millennium development program, being responsible for the fabrication of several parts for the aircraft, including the center fuselage, fairing, metallic alloys, composite materials, elevons, assembly of the sponsons, the landing gears, rear wing elevators, and parts of the rudders. It is also responsible for the assembly of various standard NATO equipment for the Portuguese Air Force C-390s. OGMA participated in the initial phase of the aircraft's development and assumed responsibility for supply chain development and management, primarily relying upon Portuguese companies.

In 2016, OGMA recorded a sales volume of 195.4 million Euros and a profit of 10.1 million Euros. In 2019, the company appointed Alexandre Solis as chief executive officer. In 2017, aircraft maintenance, repair and overhaul services accounted for about 70% of OGMA's total business volume.

== Facilities ==
OGMA is located in Alverca, in the Alverca Aeronautical Park, approximately 15 kilometres (9.3 mi) north east of Lisbon International Airport. Its facilities occupy 440,000 square metres (4,700,000 sq ft), of which 150,000 square metres (1,600,000 sq ft) are covered facilities. The location also includes a 3,000-metre (9,800 ft) runway and a control tower. Its facilities comprise 11 hangars for civil and military aircraft maintenance, manufacturing and testing.

== Air Astana incident ==
OGMA was criticised in 2020 by the Portuguese Office for the Prevention and Investigation of Accidents in Civil Aviation and Rail for faulty maintenance work that led to severe flight control problems with Air Astana Flight 1388 in 2018. The investigation found that insufficient quality assurance, oversight and management at OGMA contributed to the severe technical problems suffered by the aircraft in flight.
