= Fábrica Nacional de Munições de Armas Ligeiras =

Portuguese national small arms manufacturer

Fabrica Nacional de Municoes de Armas Ligeiras
- Industry: Weaponry
- Founded: 1947
- Headquarters: Lisbon, Portugal
- Products: Firearms, ammunition

Fábrica Nacional de Munições de Armas Ligeiras, (FNM), (English: National Light Weapons and Ammunition Factory), was the national manufacturer of small arms and ammunition in Portugal. It was established in 1947, and closed by the government of Portugal in 2001.

FNM-branded ammunition continued to be sold after the closure of the factory, however it was manufactured by prvi partizan.
