= Heckler & Koch G3 =

German battle rifle

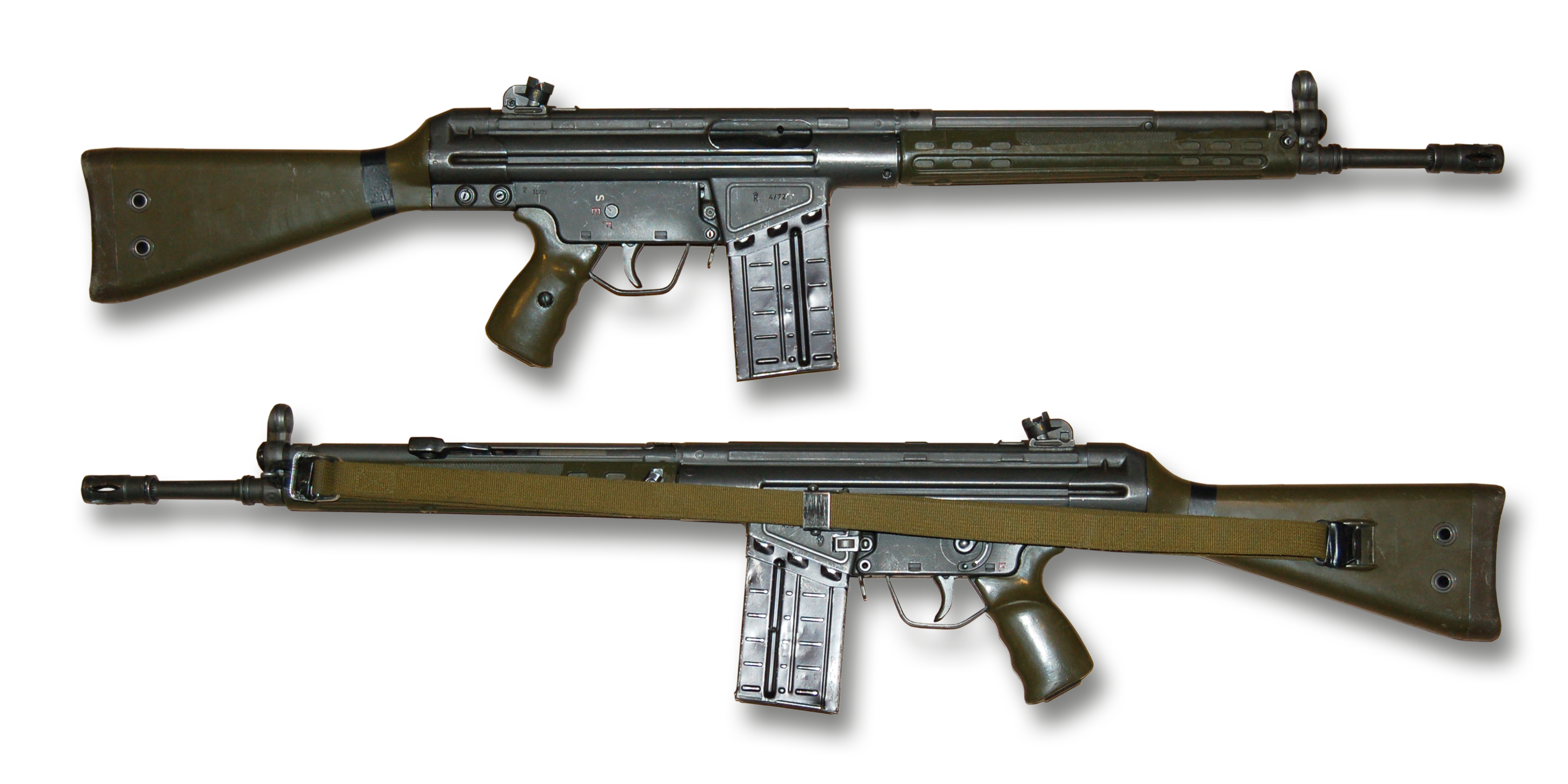
- A Norwegian-produced AG-3, the G3A5 variant of the G3, with the rifle sling attached
- Type: Battle rifle
- Place of origin: West Germany

Service history
- In service: 1959–present
- Used by: See Users
- Wars: See Conflicts

Production history
- Designer: CETME; Mauser; Heckler & Koch
- Designed: 1950s
- Manufacturer: Heckler & Koch (original); Rheinmetall; MIC; SEDENA; Kongsberg Gruppen Pakistan Ordnance Factories and others
- Produced: 1958–present
- No. built: 8,000,000
- Variants: See Variants

Specifications
- Mass: 4.38 kg (9.66 lb) (G3A3); 4.7 kg (10 lb) (G3A4)
- Length: 1,025 mm (40.4 in)
- Barrel length: 450 mm (17.7 in)
- Width: 45 mm (1.8 in)
- Height: 220 mm (8.7 in) with inserted magazine
- Cartridge: 7.62×51mm NATO
- Action: Roller-delayed blowback
- Rate of fire: 500–600 rounds/min
- Muzzle velocity: 800 m/s (2,625 ft/s)
- Maximum firing range: 1,000 metres (1,094 yd)
- Feed system: 5-, 10-, 20-, 30-, or 40-round detachable box, and 50-round and 100-round drum magazine
- Sights: Rear: rotary diopter; front: hooded post

The Heckler & Koch G3 (German: Gewehr 3) is a select-fire battle rifle chambered in 7.62×51mm NATO developed in the 1950s by the West German firearms manufacturer Heckler & Koch, in collaboration with the Spanish state-owned firearms manufacturer CETME. The G3 was the service rifle of the West German Bundeswehr until it was replaced by the Heckler & Koch G36 in the 1990s after German reunification, and was adopted into service with numerous other countries.

The G3 has been exported to over 70 countries and manufactured under license in at least 15 countries. Over 7.8 million G3s have been produced. Its modular design was used for several other HK firearm models, including the HK21, MP5, HK33, PSG1, and G41.

== History ==
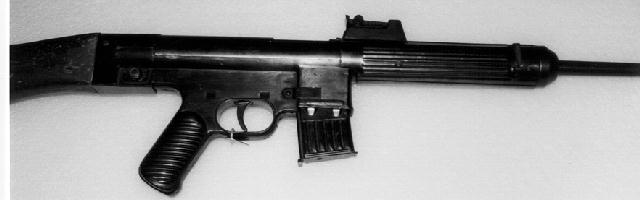

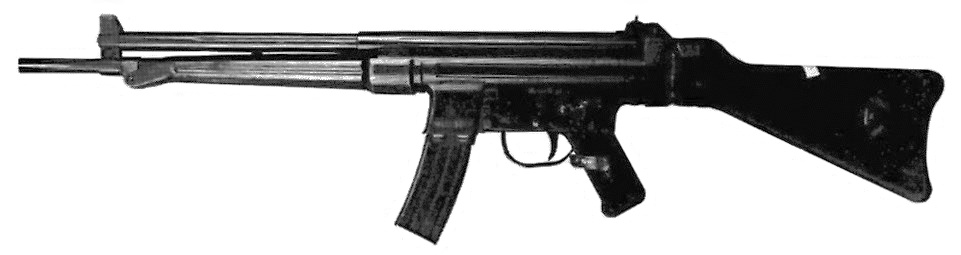
The early Mauser Gerät 06H prototype assault rifle and The CEAM Modèle 1950, a French effort to put the StG 45(M) concept into mass production. Chambered in .30 Carbine

The origin of the G3 can be traced back to the final years of World War II when Mauser engineers at the Light Weapon Development Group (Abteilung 37) at Oberndorf am Neckar designed the Maschinenkarabiner Gerät 06 (MKb Gerät 06, "machine carbine device 06") prototype assault rifle chambered for the intermediate 7.92×33mm Kurz cartridge, first with the Gerät 06 model using a roller-locked short recoil mechanism originally adapted from the MG 42 machine gun but with a fixed barrel and conventional gas-actuated piston rod. With careful attention to the mechanical ratios, the gas system could be omitted. The resultant weapon, Gerät 06H (the "H" suffix is an abbreviation for halbverriegelt - "half-locked") is known today as StG 45(M) (Sturmgewehr 45(M), assault rifle 45). However, there is no evidence that the term was ever officially used in the German Reich. The weapon was not produced in significant numbers and the war ended before the first production rifles were completed.

The German technicians involved in developing the StG 45(M) were taken to work in France at Centre d'Etudes et d'Armement de Mulhouse (CEAM). The StG 45(M) mechanism was modified by Ludwig Vorgrimler and Theodor Löffler at the Mulhouse facility between 1946 and 1949. Three versions were made, chambered in .30 Carbine, 7.92×33mm Kurz, and the experimental 7.65×35mm French short cartridge developed by Cartoucherie de Valence in 1948. A 7.5×38mm cartridge using a partial aluminium bullet was abandoned in 1947. Löffler's design, designated Carabine Mitrailleuse Modèle 1950, was retained for trials among 12 different prototypes designed by CEAM, MAC, and MAS. Engaged in the Indochina War and being the second NATO contributor, France canceled the adoption of these new weapons for financial reasons.

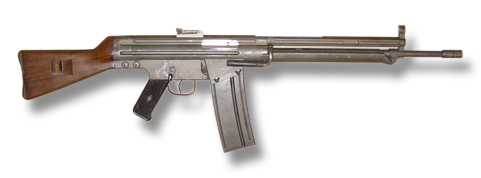
CETME A2b 7.92×40mm CETME M53 developmental prototype

In 1950, Vorgrimler moved to Spain where he created the LV-50 rifle chambered for the Kurz cartridge and later, the proprietary 7.92×40mm CETME M53 round. At this point, the rifle was renamed the Modelo 2. The Modelo 2 drew the attention of the West German Bundesgrenzschutz (Border Guards), who sought to re-equip the newly formed national defense forces. Not willing to accept a cartridge outside of the NATO specification, the West Germans asked CETME to develop a 7.62×51mm version of the rifle. The resulting CETME Model A was chambered for the 7.62×51mm CETME cartridge which was identical in chamber dimensions but had a reduced-power load compared to the 7.62×51mm NATO round. Further development of the rifle with input from H&K produced the CETME Model B which received several modifications, including the ability to fire from a closed bolt in both semi-automatic and automatic firing modes, a new perforated sheet metal handguard (the folding bipod had been the foregrip in previous models), improved ergonomics and a slightly longer barrel with a 22 mm rifle grenade launcher guide. In 1958, this rifle was accepted into service with the Spanish Army as the Modelo 58, using the 7.62×51mm CETME round.

In 1956, the Bundesgrenzschutz canceled their planned procurement of the CETME rifles, adopting the Belgian-made FN FAL as the Gewehr 1 (G1) instead. However, the newly formed West German military (Bundeswehr) now showed interest and soon purchased a number of CETME rifles (7.62×51mm NATO chambering) for further testing. The CETME, known as the Automatisches Gewehr G3 according to West German nomenclature, competed successfully against the Swiss SIG SG 510 (G2) and the American AR-10 (G4) to replace the previously favored G1 rifle. In 1956 the Bundeswehr started extended troop trials with 400 CETME rifles. Heckler & Koch made a number of changes to the CETME rifles. In January 1959, the Bundeswehr officially adopted the technically improved CETME proposal. The West German government wanted the G3 rifle to be produced under license in West Germany; purchase of the G1 had previously fallen through over FN's refusal to grant such a license. In the case of the G3, the Dutch firm Nederlandse Wapen en Munitiefabriek (NWM) held production and sales rights to the CETME design outside of Spain. To acquire production rights, the West German government offered NWM contracts to supply the West German air force (Luftwaffe) with 20mm ammunition. Production of the G3 was then assigned to Rheinmetall and Heckler & Koch. The latter company already had ties to CETME, and had worked to further optimize the CETME rifle for use with the full-power 7.62×51mm NATO cartridge (as opposed to the downgraded CETME variant). In 1969, Rheinmetall gave up production rights to the G3 in exchange for Heckler & Koch's promise not to bid on MG 3 machine gun production. Later in 1977, the West German government ceded ownership of G3 production and sales rights exclusively to Heckler & Koch. After obtaining these rights, Heckler & Koch initially had to pay the government 4 Deutsche Marks per rifle, despite having been awarded the contract by the West German government.

Initial production G3 rifles differed substantially from more recent models; early rifles featured closed-type mechanical flip-up sights (with two apertures), a lightweight folding bipod, a stamped sheet steel handguard, a wooden buttstock (in fixed stock models) or a telescopic metal stock. Before delivery to the Bundeswehr, each G3 went through functional checks, zeroing the sight line (Anschießen) and a shooting test at the factory. In the process, five shots were fired at a target at 100 metres (109 yd) with particularly accurate sighting-in ammunition. The 5-shot group could not exceed 120 mm (4.7 in) (1.2 mil/4.13 MOA) diameter. The weapon was modernized during its service life (among other minor modifications it received new sights, a different flash suppressor, and a synthetic handguard and shoulder stock), resulting in the most recent production models, the G3A3 (with a fixed polymer stock) and the G3A4 (telescoping metal stock). The rifle proved successful in the export market, being adopted by the armed forces of over 40 countries. Of that figure, 18 countries undertook domestic production of the G3 under license. Known manufacturers of the weapon included France (MAS), Greece (Hellenic Defence Systems), Iran (Defense Industries Organization), Luxembourg (Luxemburg Defense Technologie), Mexico, Myanmar, Norway (Kongsberg Våpenfabrikk), Pakistan (Pakistan Ordnance Factories), Portugal (FBP), Saudi Arabia (Military Industries Corporation (Saudi Arabia)), Sweden (Husqvarna Vapenfabrik AB and FFV Carl-Gustaf in Eskilstuna), Thailand, Turkey (MKEK) and the United Kingdom (Royal Ordnance).

The Bundeswehr was working on improving their G3 rifles in the 1990s with a brass deflector that deflects spent cartridge cases down and frontwards from the operator and a new polymer pistol-grip/fire-control assembly module that allows better ambidextrous operation of the safety lever when they had their G3 rifles replaced for the Heckler & Koch G36. Currently (2018) hundreds of thousands of G3A3A1, G3A4A1 and G3KA4A1 modernized variants rifles are maintained by Bundeswehr personnel and kept in reserve or are available in military base small arms storages. The Iranian version remains in production as of 2024.

== Design details ==
=== Operating mechanism ===
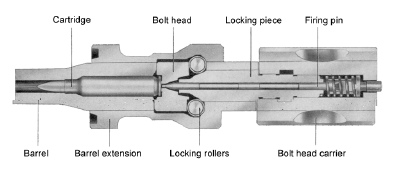
A schematic of the G3 roller-delayed blowback mechanism

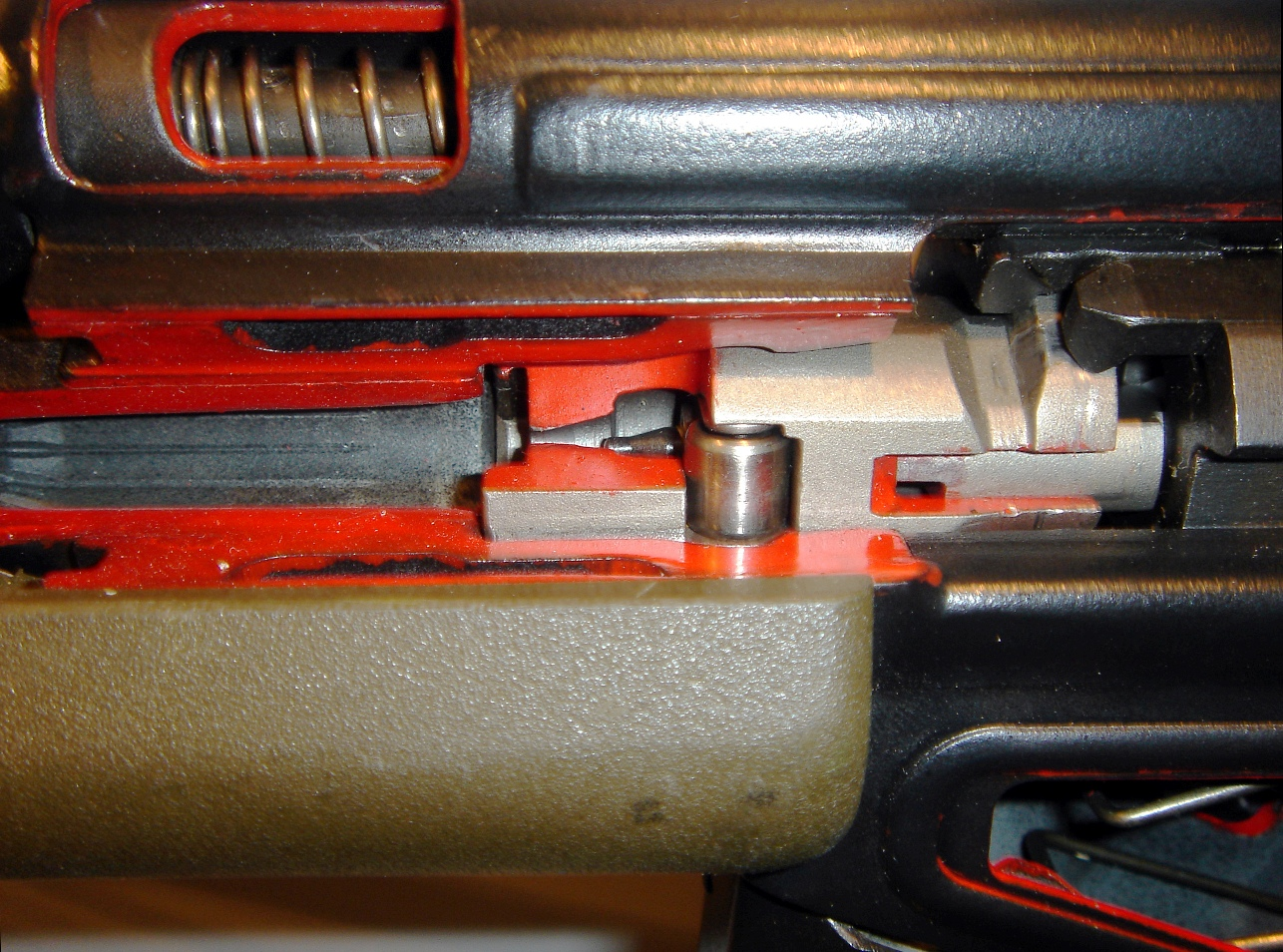
Cutaway model of the chamber with gas relief flutes (left) and roller-delayed action of the G3 battle rifle

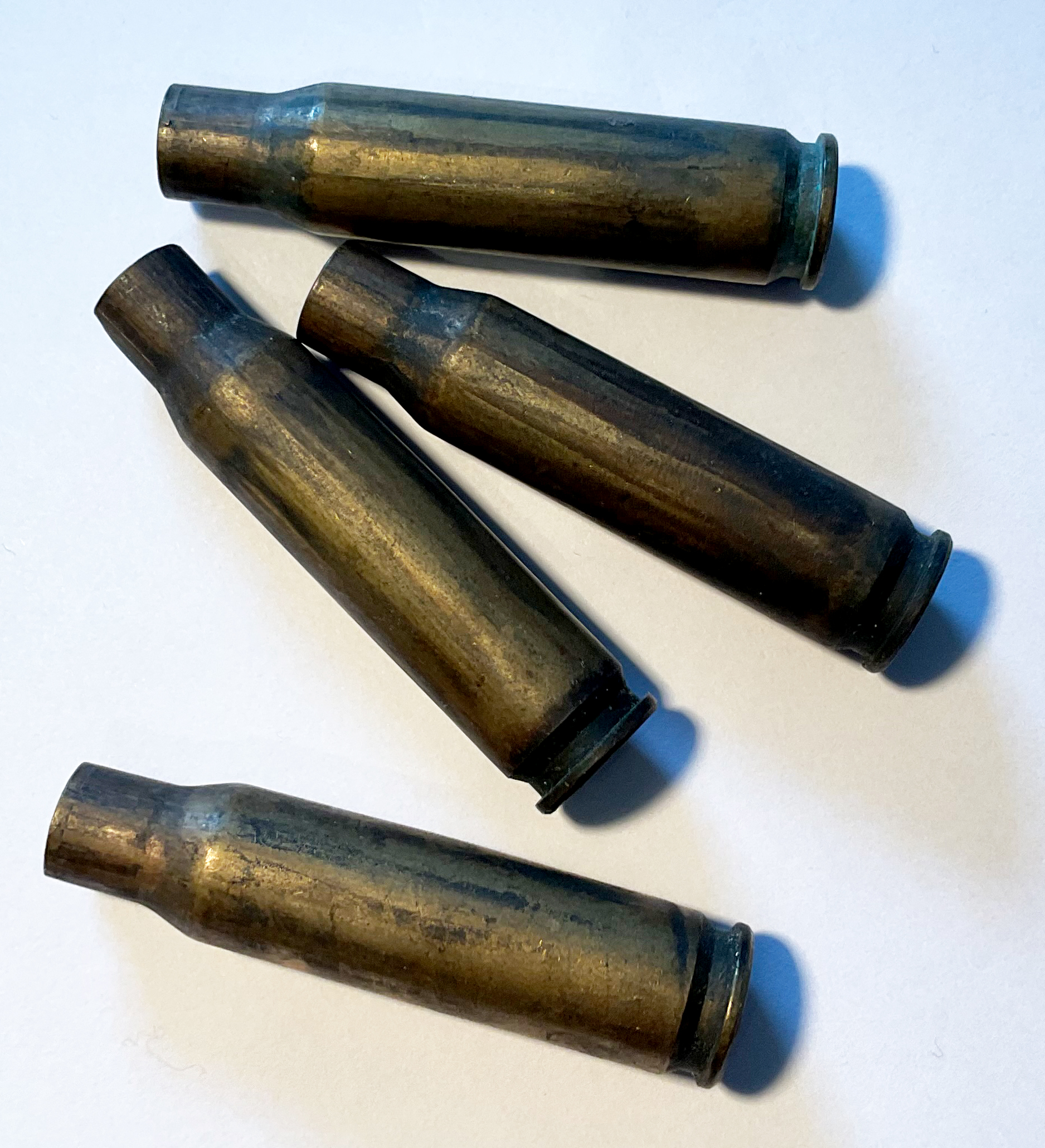
Fired cartridge cases with scorch marks at the front outer surface caused by intentional propellant gas ingress at the gas relief flutes

Schematic of a fluted chamber, as used in the H&K G3 rifle

The G3 is a selective-fire automatic weapon that employs a roller-delayed blowback operating system. The two-piece bolt assembly consists of a breech (bolt head) and bolt carrier. The bolt is held in battery by two sliding cylindrical rollers that engage locking recesses in the barrel extension. The breech is opened when both rollers are compressed inward against camming surfaces driven by the rearward pressure of the expanding gases upon the bolt head. As the rollers move inward, recoil energy is transferred to the locking piece and bolt carrier which begin to withdraw while the bolt head slowly moves rearward in relation to the bolt carrier. As the bolt carrier clears the rollers, pressure in the bore drops to a safe level, the bolt head is caught by the bolt carrier and moves to the rear as one unit, continuing the operating cycle.

Based on the geometric relationship arising from the angles of the roller contact surfaces of the locking piece and the barrel extension recesses, the recoil of the bolt head is delayed by a ratio of 4:1 for the 7.62×51mm NATO chambering. Thus during the same period of time, the bolt head carrier moves 4 times faster than the bolt head. This ratio is continued until the locking rollers have been withdrawn from the barrel extension recesses.

The bolt features an anti-bounce mechanism that prevents the bolt from bouncing off the barrel's breech surface. The "bolt head locking lever" is a spring-loaded claw mounted on the bolt carrier that grabs the bolt head as the bolt carrier group goes into battery. The lever essentially ratchets into place with friction, providing enough resistance to being re-opened that the bolt carrier does not rebound. The spring-powered claw extractor is also contained inside the bolt while the lever ejector is located inside the trigger housing (actuated by the recoiling bolt).

The chamber has longitudinal gas relief flutes cut in the chamber wall to ease the cartridge case's extraction upon firing. These flutes allow propellant gas to flow between the case and chamber wall, equalizing the pressure between the inner and outer surfaces of the front of the cartridge case. The intentional propellant gas ingress at the gas relief flutes significantly reduces case friction against the chamber wall, making extraction more reliable by preventing the cartridge case from sticking and tearing.

The reliable functioning of roller-delayed blowback mechanisms is limited by specific ammunition and arm parameters like bullet weight, propellant charge, barrel length and amount of wear. For obtaining a proper and safe functioning parameters bandwidth Heckler & Koch offer a variety of locking pieces with different mass and shoulder angles. The angles are critical and determine the unlock timing and pressure curve progression as the locking pieces act in unison with the bolt head carrier.

=== Features ===
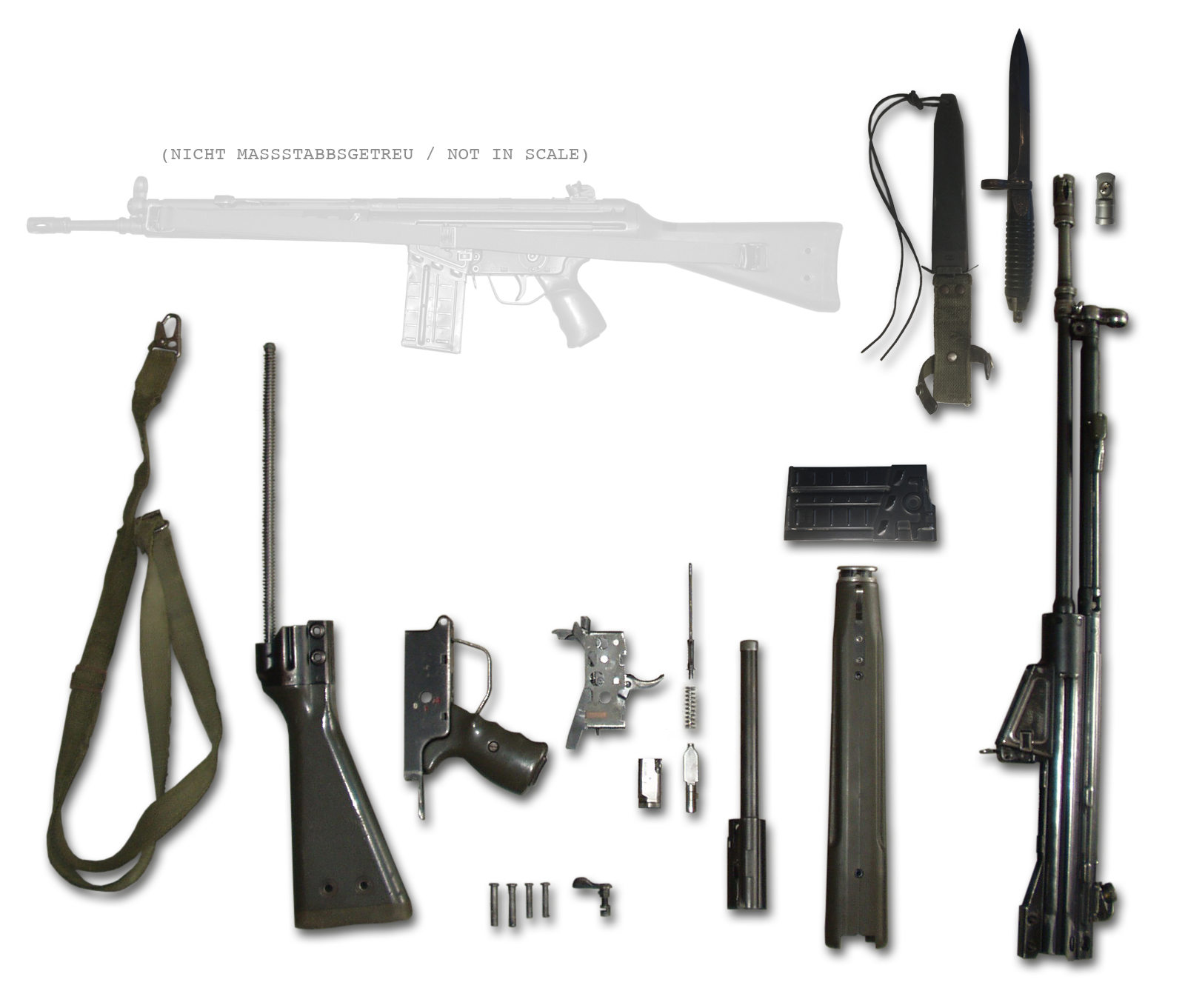
Field-stripped G3A3 rifle showing its modular design

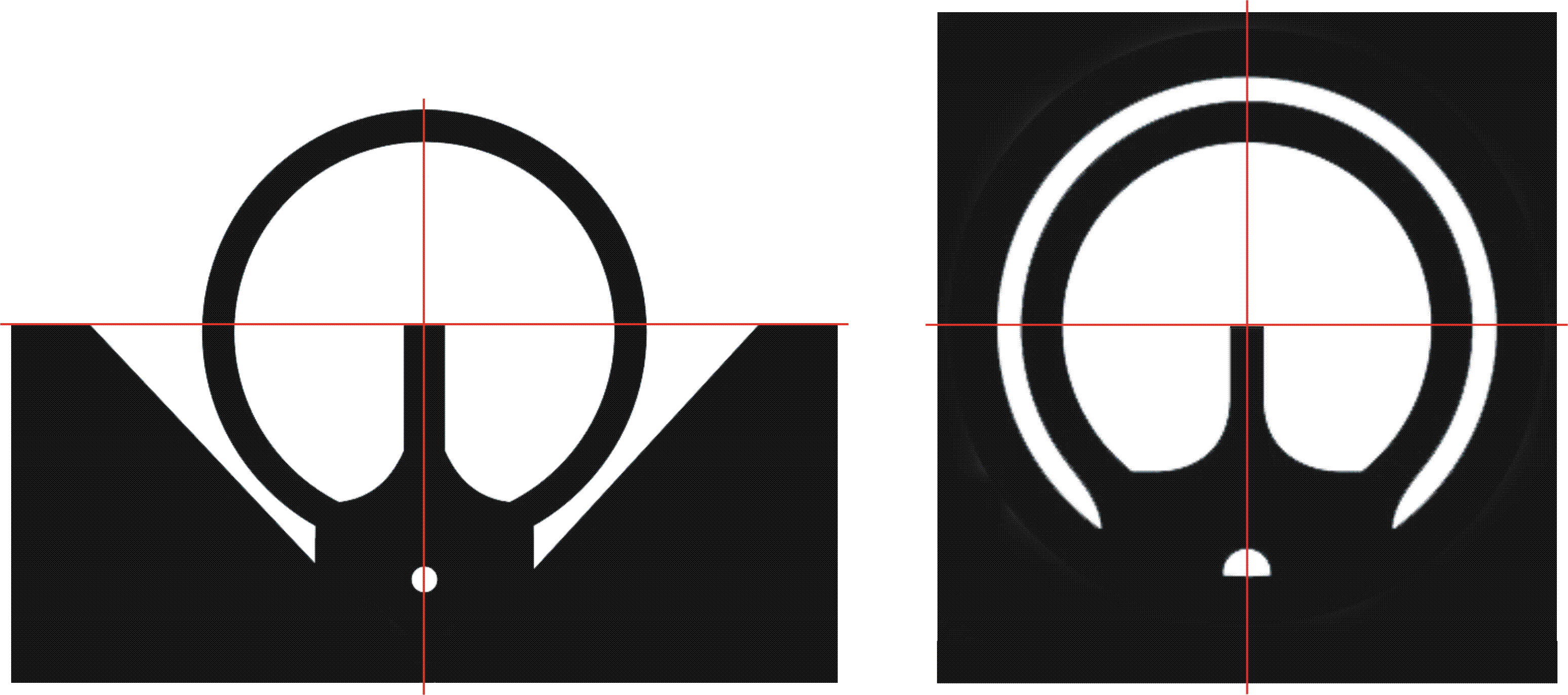
Drehvisier rotating drum sight pictures

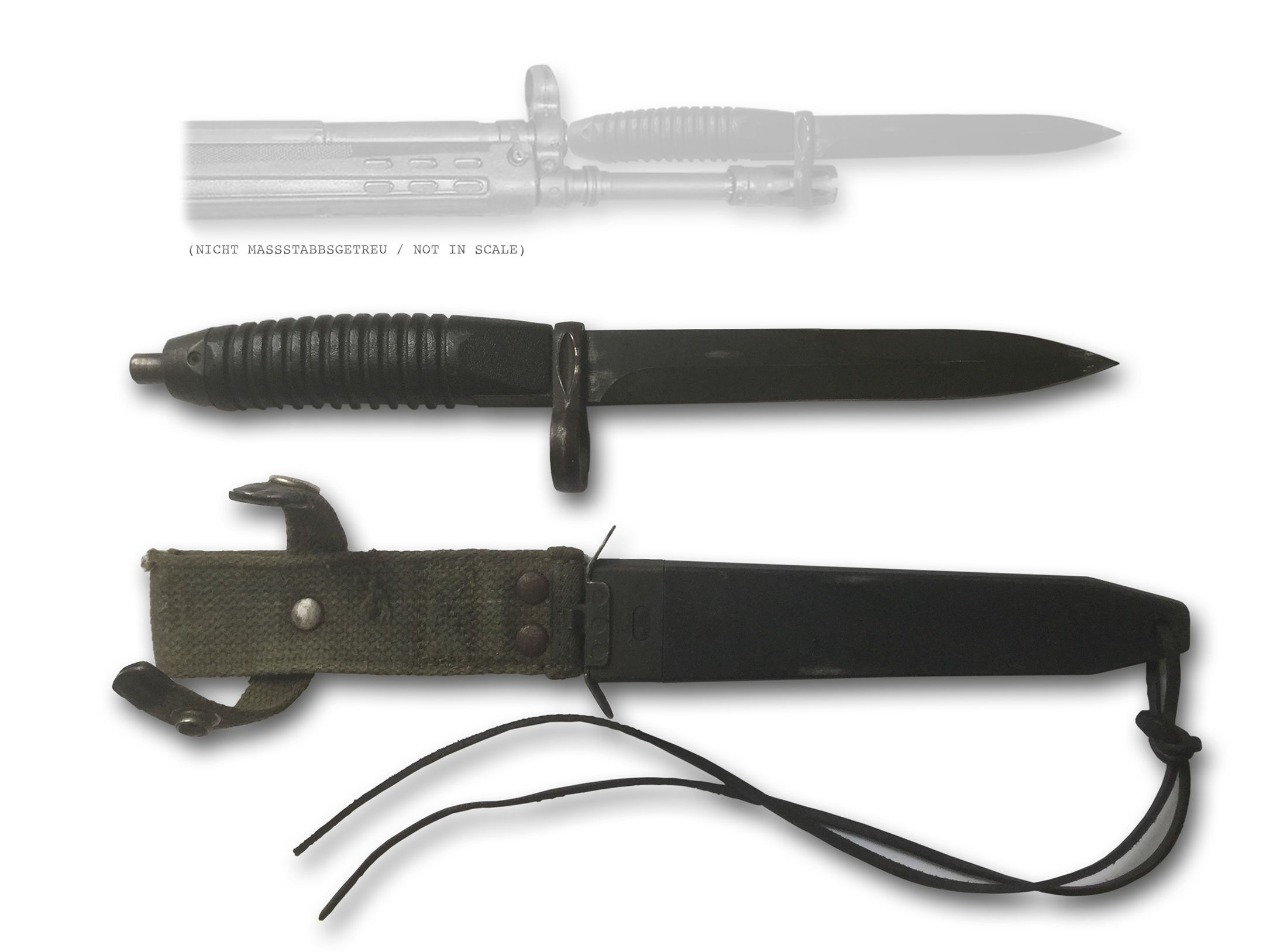
HK G3 Bayonet with scabbard

The G3 is a modular weapon system designed for a 6,000 round service life Bundeswehr requirement. Its butt-stock, fore-stock and pistol-grip/fire-control assembly may be changed at will in a variety of configurations (listed below). Simple push-pins hold the components in place and removing them will allow the user to remove and replace parts rapidly. The weapon made extensive use of cost-saving pressed and stamped steel components rather than machined parts and spot welding to connect parts. The stamped sheet metal cocking handle tube and receiver are large exposed parts that are prone to deformation from hard impact as they were designed to be relatively thin to save weight. If dented severely or deep enough during field service, reliability problems due to internal parts movement impairments can occur that put the rifle out of action and can not be field solved by the user. To determine and correct such situations armorers are trained to employ specially designed "GO" and symmetry gauges and straightening mandrels to repair such problems fairly quickly.

==== Trigger ====
The rifle is hammer fired and has a trigger mechanism with a 3-position fire selector switch that is also the manual safety toggle that secures the weapon from accidentally discharging (fire selector in the "E" or "1" position – single fire mode (Einzelfeuer), "F" or "20" – automatic fire (Feuerstoß), "S" or "0" – weapon is safe (Sicher), trigger disabled mechanically). The weapon can be fitted with an optional four-position safety/fire selector group illustrated with pictograms with an ambidextrous selector lever. The additional, fourth selector setting enables a three-round burst mode of fire. The rifle has a relatively high trigger pull of 50–55 N (11.2–12.4 lb_{f}) due to a drop safety requirement. An interchangeable set-trigger pack assembly featuring a trigger stop and less trigger pull is available for the G3SG/1 and other sniping orientated variants.

==== Sights ====
The original G3 and G3A1 rifle variants had a relatively low iron sight line that consisted of a Klappvisier, an "L-type" flip up rear sight and hooded front post. From the G3A2 variant the firearm is equipped with a relatively low iron sight line that consists of a Drehvisier a rotary rear drum and hooded front post. The rear sight is mechanically adjustable for both windage and elevation with the help of tools. This deliberately prevents non-armorers to (re)zero the iron sight line. The rotary drum features an open V-notch (numbered 1) for rapid target acquisition, close range, low light and impaired visibility use and three apertures (numbered 2, 3 and 4) used for: 200–400 metres (219–437 yd) in 100 metres (109 yd) increments for more precise aiming. The 1 V-notch and 2 or 200 metres (219 yd) aperture settings have an identical point of aim. The V-notch and apertures are calibrated for US M80 / German DM111 series or other equivalent 9.5 grams (147 gr) 7.62×51mm NATO ball ammunition. The receiver housing has recesses that work with STANAG claw mounts/HK clamp adapters used to mount day or night aiming optics.

==== Barrel ====
The rifled barrel – four right-hand grooves with a 305 mm (12.0 in) twist rate to adequately stabilize the military 7.62×51mm NATO ammunition of the era – terminates with a slotted flash suppressor which can also be used to attach a bayonet or serve as an adapter for launching rifle grenades. From the G3A3 the barrel was free floated from the stock and had polygonal rifling. The barrel chamber is fluted with twelve flutes, which assists in the initial extraction of a spent cartridge casing (since the breech is opened under very high barrel in internal cartridge case pressure).

==== Feeding ====
The G3A3 (A4) uses either steel (260 g) or aluminium (140 g) 20-round double-stacked straight box magazines, or a 50-round drum magazine. H&K developed a prototype plastic disposable magazine in the early 1960s, but it was not adopted as aluminum magazines were just as light and proved more durable, as well as easier to produce.

==== Accessories ====
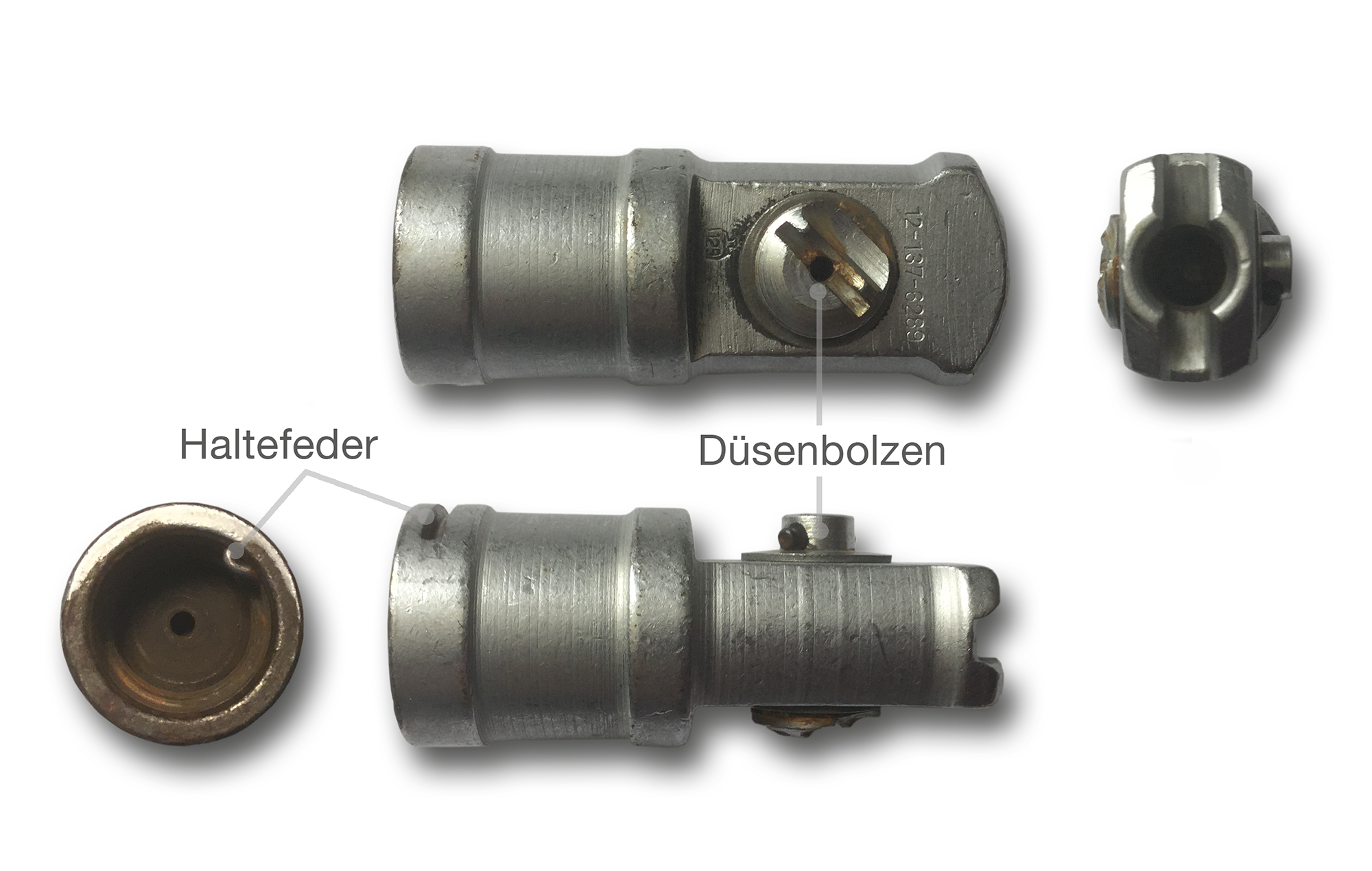
G3 blank firing adapter

Standard accessories supplied with the rifle include: a detachable bipod (not included with rifles that have a perforated plastic handguard), sling, cleaning kit and a speed-loading device. Several types of bayonet are available for the G3, but with few exceptions they require an adapter to be inserted into the end of the cocking tube. The most common type features a 6 3/4 inch spear-point blade nearly identical with the M7 bayonet, but with a different grip because of its mounting above the barrel. The weapon can also mount a 40 mm HK79 under-barrel grenade launcher, blank firing adapter, a straight blowback bolt (called a "PT" bolt, lacks rollers) used for firing 7.62×51mm ammunition with plastic bullets, a conversion kit used for training with .22 Long Rifle ammunition and a sound suppressor (that uses standard ammunition).

== Variants ==
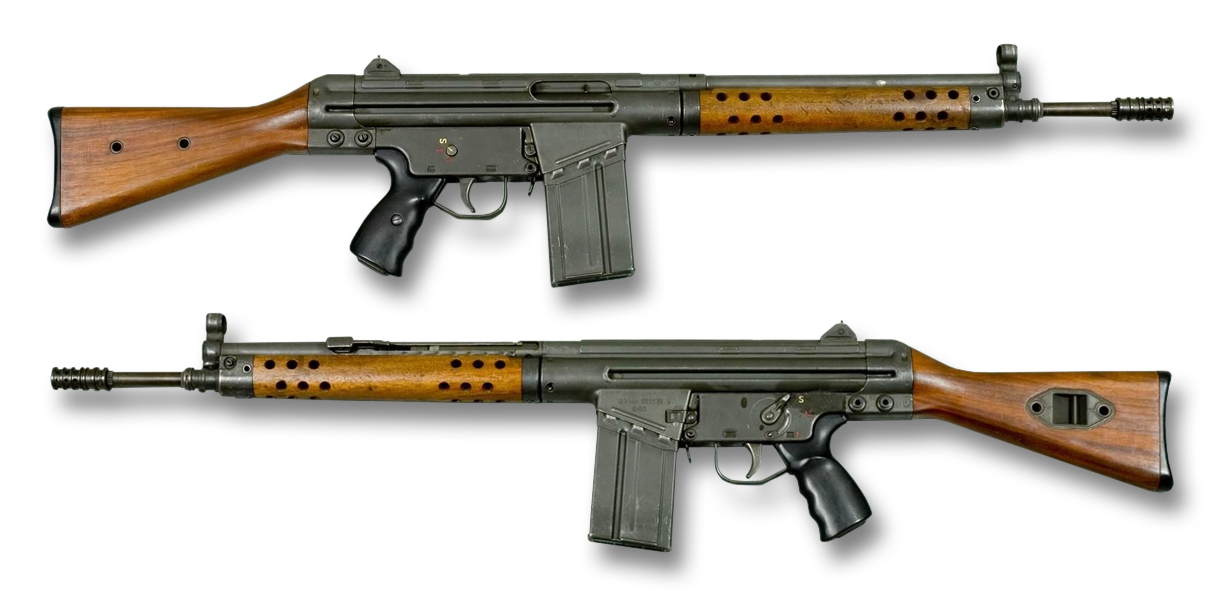
Original G3 variant with older style flip up sights and wooden furniture

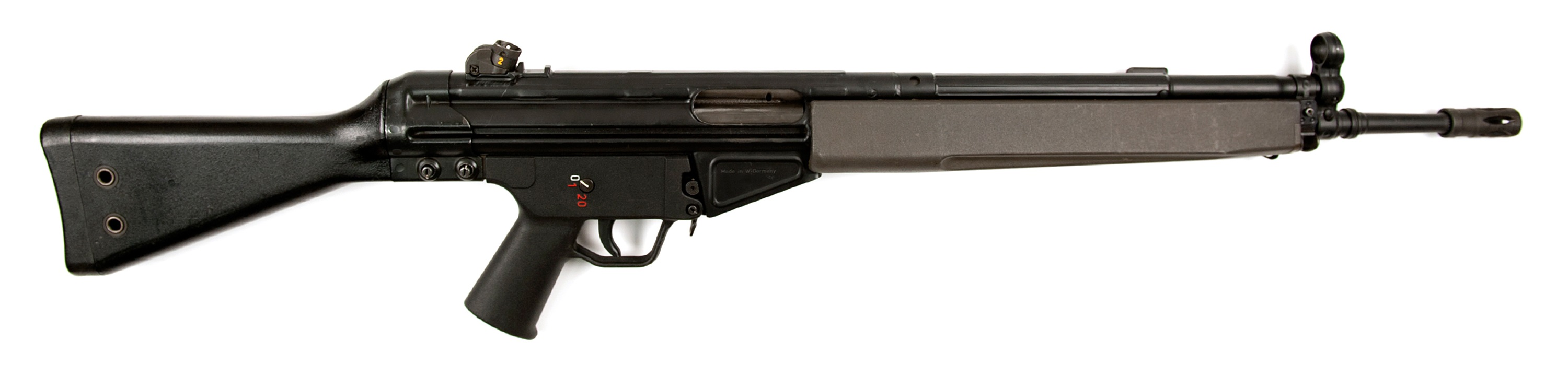
G3A2 Freischwinger (FS)

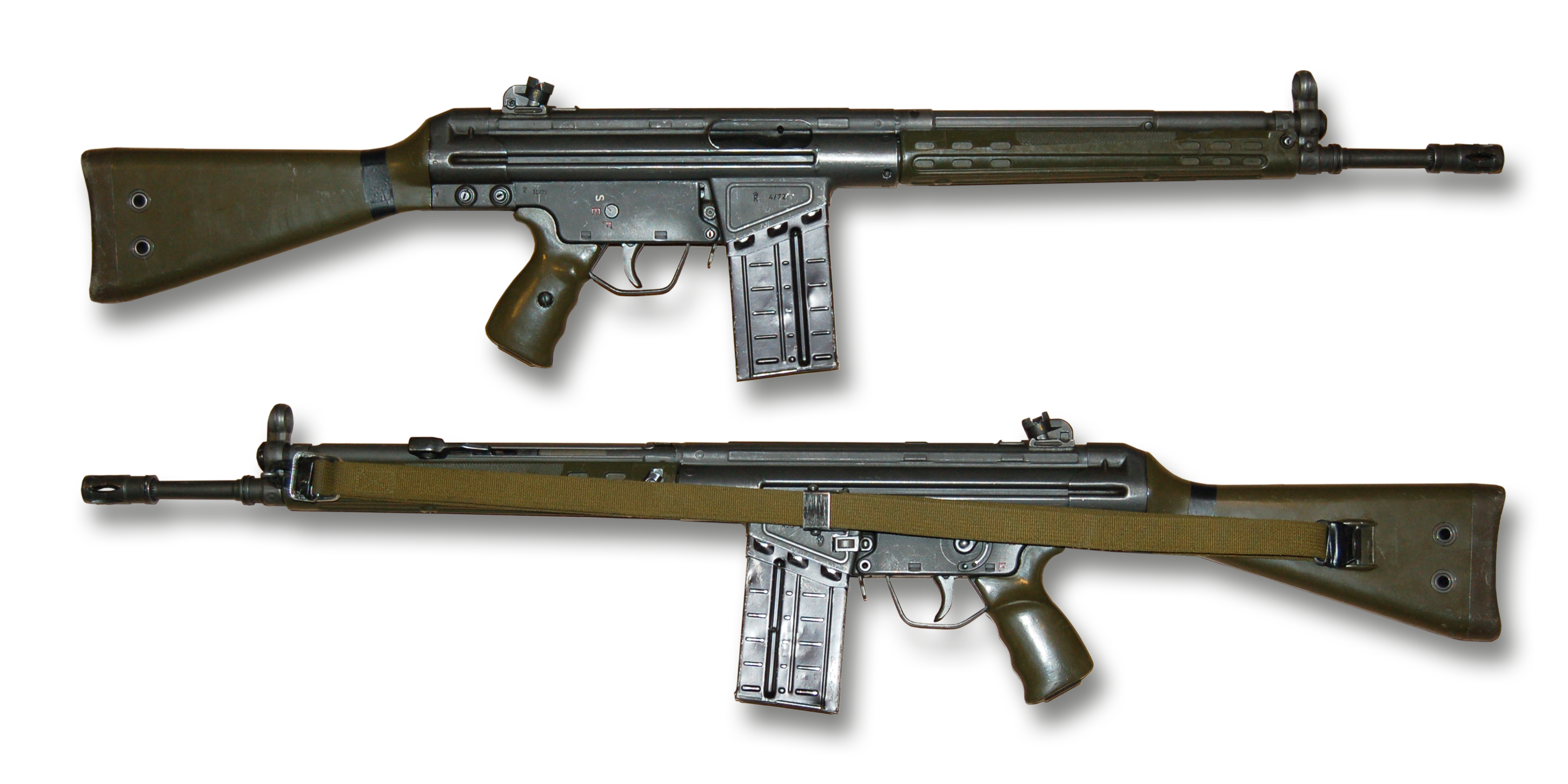
G3A3

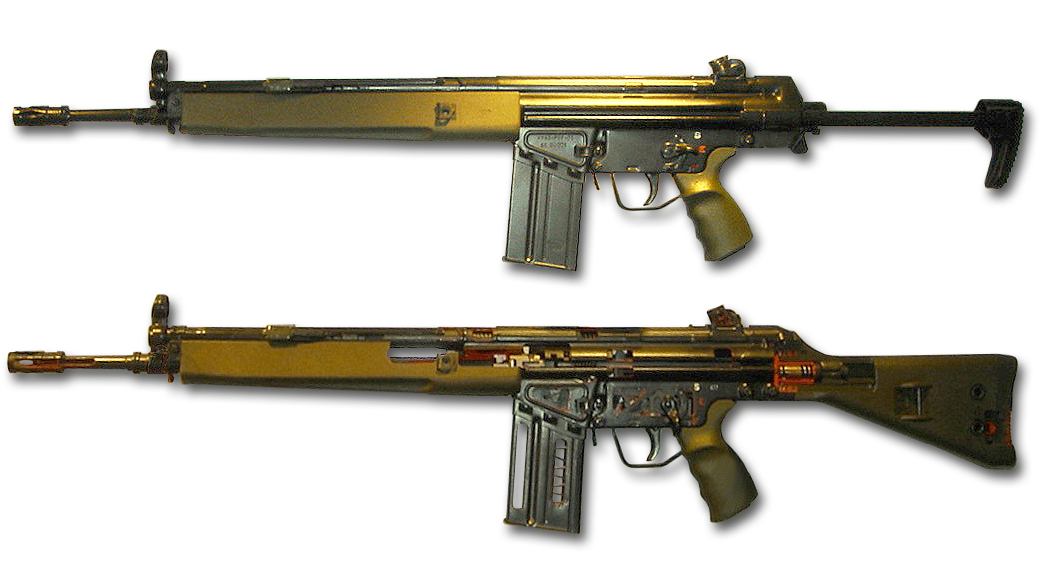
G3A4 and G3A3

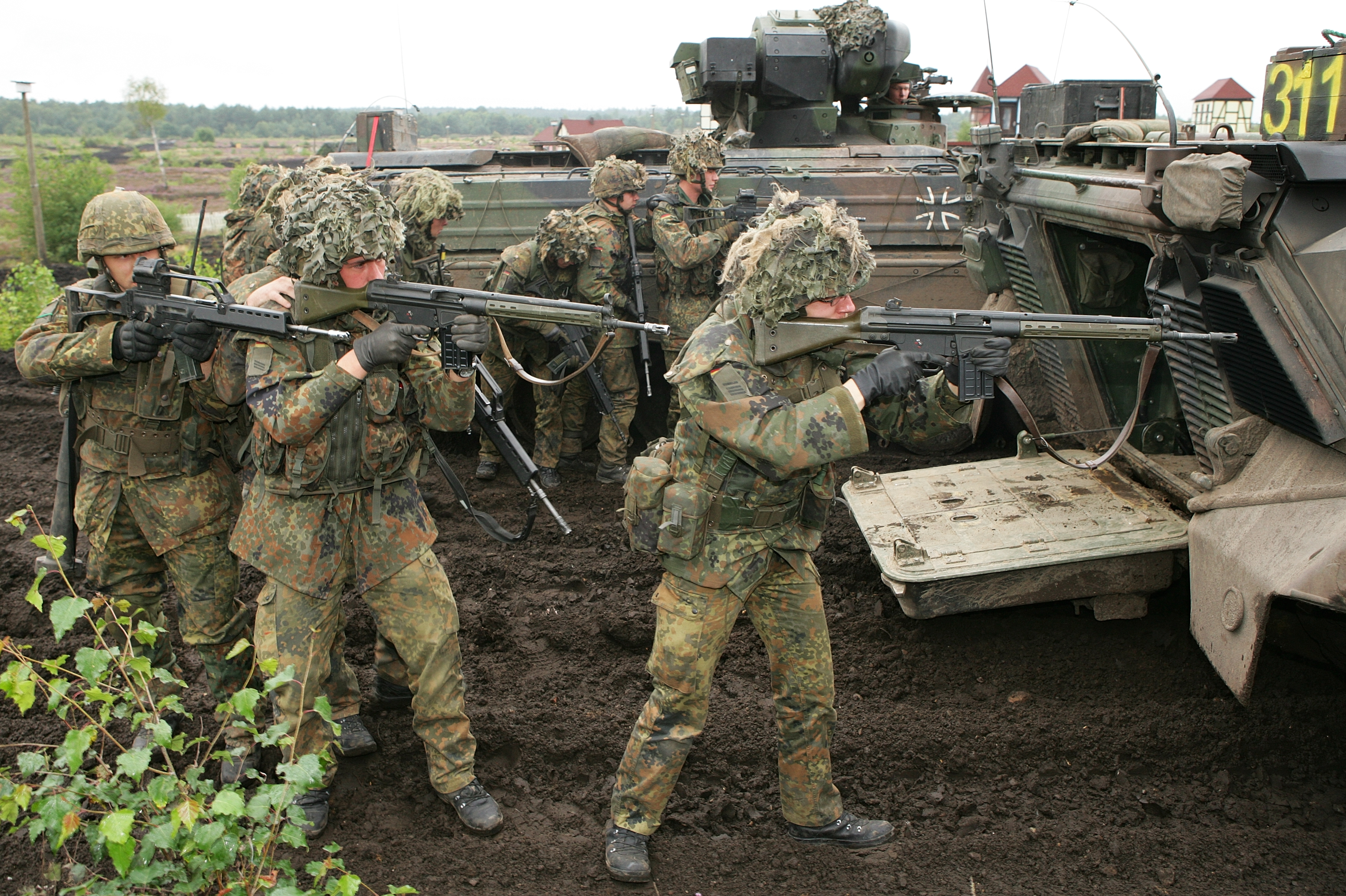
Bundeswehr soldiers armed with G3A3A1 and G36 rifles in 2010

The G3 served as a basis for many other weapons, among them: the PSG1 and MSG90 precision rifles, the HK11 and HK21 family of light machine guns, a semi-automatic version known as the HK41, a "sporterized" model called the SR9 (designed for the civilian market in countries where the HK91 would not qualify, primarily the US after the 1989 importation restrictions) and the MC51 carbine.

- G3: Original model based on the CETME Model 58 introduced in 1959 and approved in 1960. It had a wooden stock and handguard.
- G3A1: G3 approved in 1963 with a single-position, retractable stock sliding in grooves pressed in the sides of the body, locked by a catch under the special bodycap. This design was chosen after earlier experimentation with an MP-40 style ventrally-folding metal stock; excessive recoil caused it to be dropped from consideration.
- G3A2: G3 developed in 1962 with new rotating drum rear sight and a Freischwinger (FS) free-floating barrel that significantly improved accuracy.
- G3A3: The most well known 1963 version. Drum sights with an improved front sight, a flash-suppressor/muzzle brake capable of firing NATO standard grenades, a fixed solid plastic buttstock, and a plastic handguard that does not contact the free-floating barrel. The handguard came in a slim, ventilated version and a wide version. The latter allows for the attachment of a bipod.
- G3A4: The G3A4 uses drum sights and a single position, retractable stock. Entered service in 1974 for frontline infantry units.
- G3KA3: Variant of G3KA4 with fixed stock.
- G3KA4: Smallest of the line, it is a Karabiner, or carbine version of the G3. It uses an HK33 handguard, features drum sights, a retractable stock, and a 322mm/12.69" barrel (reduced in length to the base of the front sight post), that is too short for use with a bayonet or rifle grenades.

=== Models made under license ===
The G3 rifle is or was produced under license in the following countries: Pakistan, Brazil, Iran, France, Greece, Norway, Mexico, Myanmar, Portugal, Saudi Arabia, Sweden and Turkey.

The Pakistani manufacturer, Pakistan Ordnance Factories (POF) uses the same model number for both automatic versions as well as versions of different manufacturing that are made as semi-automatic for the civilian market. POF's definition of the civilian versions are "Semi Auto Irreversible".

- G3A3: Model number for Pakistani-made version of G3A3, manufactured in two different versions; automatic or semi-automatic.
- G3P4: Model number for Pakistani-made version of G3A4, manufactured in two different versions; automatic or semi-automatic.
- G3A5: HK assigned model number for the HK-made Danish version of the G3A3. It differs in that it has a silent bolt-closure device. In Danish service it is known as the Gv M/66. The Gv M/66 was originally intended for use with optics as a designated marksman rifle, while the rest of the squad were issued M1 Garands.
- G3A6: HK assigned model number for the Iranian-made version of the G3A3. It differs in having a dark-green handguard, stock, and trigger pack.
- G3A7: HK assigned model number for the Turkish-made version of the G3A3.
- G3A7A1: HK assigned model number for the Turkish-made version of the G3A4.
- HSG1: HK assigned model number for the Luxembourg-made version of the G3A3.
- BA63: Model number for Myanmar-made version of original G3 (with wooden stock, handguard and flip sight)

=== Other military variants and derivatives ===
==== Denmark ====
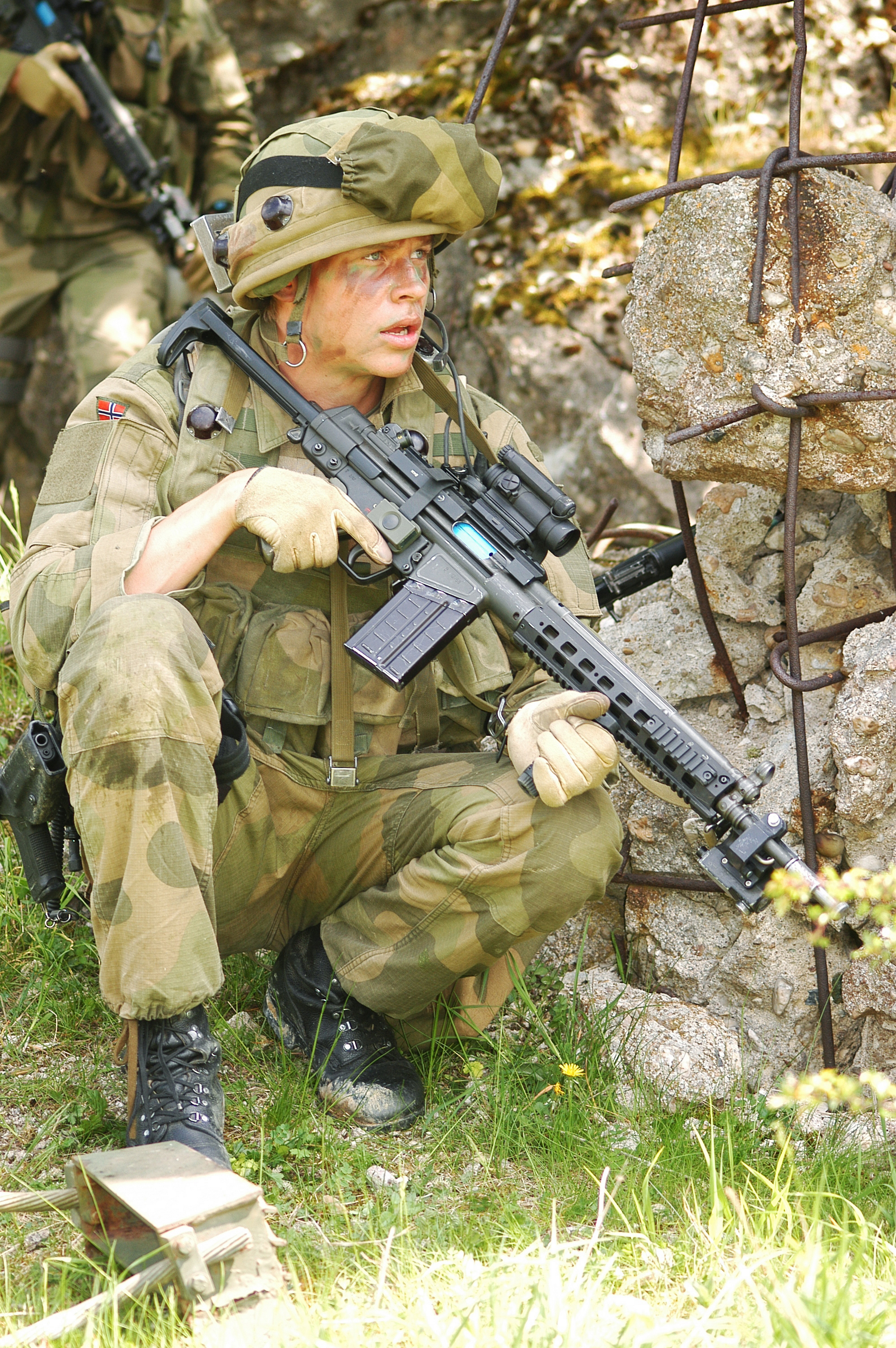
A Norwegian soldier with the licence-built AG-3F2 model fitted with a Brügger & Thomet railed forend, vertical grip and Aimpoint red dot sight

- Gv M/75: Variant leased from the German Bundeswehr / German government by the Danish government to replace the aging M1 Garands. Originally manufactured by either Rheinmetall or HK for the German Bundeswehr. The Gv M/75 rifles are basically G3s with the old style straight cocking tube as opposed to the later FS (Freischwinger, "Cantilevered") variant. The Rheinmetall versions lack an external selector lever and can be converted from semi-automatic to full automatic (or vice versa) by the use of a special tool.

==== Myanmar ====
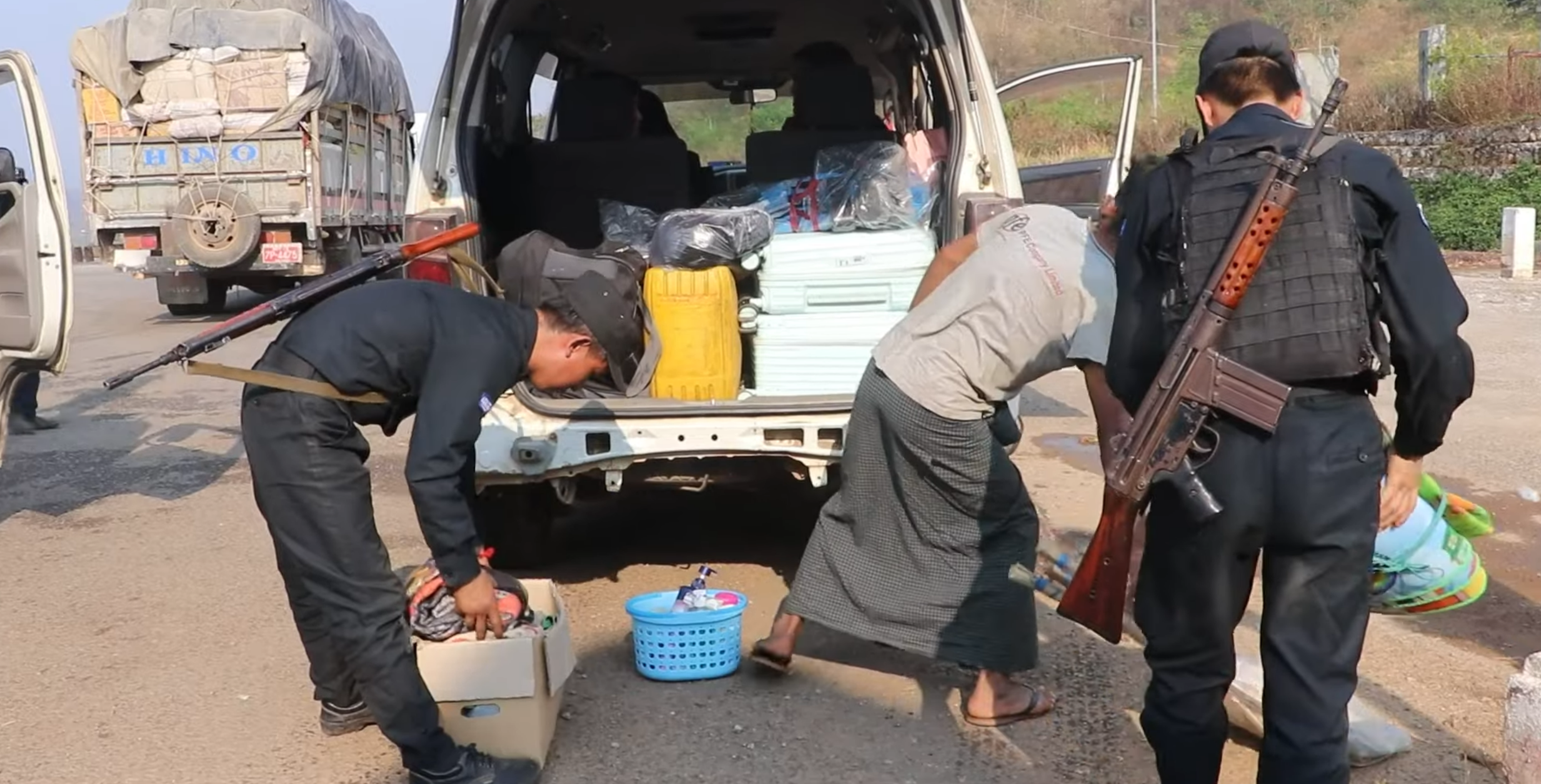
Police officers belonging to the Ta'ang National Liberation Army searching a vehicle. The officer to the right has a BA63.

- BA63 (Burma Army): Licensed produced G3 by Myanmar stated owned KaPaSa factories in partnership with Fritz Werner Industry Ausrustungen-Gmbh (FRG) and the German Technical Corporation Agency with licensing rights sold by 1960 with the first 10,000 G3s bought from West Germany (through Rheinmetall) before Burmese factories went operational due to fears that it could align with East Germany. It was the main battle rifle for Myanmar armed forces until they were replaced by MA series 5.56mm assault rifles in 1995. The BA63 is still in service with Myanmar Police Force, People's Militia and ethnic Border Guard Forces.
- BA64: Typically known as the G4 in Myanmar armed forces, this is the heavy barreled light machine gun (LMG) version of standard G3A3 with bipod, carrying handle and full metal hand-guard with ventilation ports. Produced by KaPaSa factories in partnership with Fritz Werner Industry Ausrustungen-Gmbh (FRG). As standard, a pair of G4s were issued to every infantry section in the Myanmar Army. It has now been phased out from in favour of the MA series light machine guns. The BA64 remained in service with Myanmar Police Force, People's Militia and ethnic Border Guard Forces.
- BA72: Typically known as G2 in Myanmar. Assault carbine version of G3A4/G3K with shorter barrel and wooden stock.
- BA100: A copy of the G3A3ZF sniper rifle.

==== Norway ====
- AG-3: Norwegian G3A5 variant produced by Kongsberg Våpenfabrikk, with the given name Automatgevær 3. A total of 253,497 units were produced for the Norwegian Armed Forces from 1967 to 1974. The Norwegian AG-3 differs from the original G3; it has a buttstock that is approx. 2 cm longer, the bolt carrier has a serrated thumb groove to aid in silent bolt closure, it features an all-metal cocking handle and a different bayonet mount. Throughout Autumn 2020, the Norwegian home guard began to replace the AG-3 with the Heckler & Koch HK416 and MP7, a transition which is planned to see completion by the end of the year.
- AG-3F1: An AG-3 with a retractable stock as on G3A4. Produced by Kongsberg Våpenfabrikk. A retractable stock was required by certain groups of soldiers within the Norwegian Armed Forces, primarily vehicle crews with limited space inside, particularly where a quick disembarkment from such a vehicle is required. All versions of the AG-3 have the ability to attach a 40 mm HK79 grenade launcher.
- AG-3F2: An improvement of the AG-3F1, featuring B&T Picatinny rails on the receiver, as well as a RIS handguard. On the AG-3F2, Aimpoint red dot sights were mounted onto the receiver top rail for faster quick acquisition, and easier aiming in low-light conditions.

==== Portugal ====
- m/963 The HK G3 was selected to equip the Portuguese Armed Forces as the new service rifle. Fábrica de Braço de Prata started in 1962 to manufacture under licence the G3, including the manufacture of its components and parts and its final assembly. Later, West Germany placed an order for 50,000 Portuguese-made G3 rifles for its own armed forces.

==== Sweden ====
- Ak 4: Swedish-made version of the G3A3, with a buttstock that is 2 cm longer, the bolt carrier has a serrated thumb groove to aid in silent bolt closure and fitted with a heavy buffer for higher number of rounds fired before failure. The iron sights feature extended 200–500 metres (219–547 yd) sight adjustments in 100 metres (109 yd) increments, because the 500 metres (547 yd) hit probability met Swedish military doctrine. The rifles were manufactured from 1965 to 1970 by both Carl Gustafs stads gevärsfaktori and Husqvarna Vapenfabriks and from 1970 until the end of production in 1985 – exclusively by Carl Gustaf in Eskilstuna. All Ak 4s are adapted to mount the M203 grenade launcher. Sweden has supplied unmodified Ak 4s to Estonia, Latvia and Lithuania.
- Ak 4OR: Optiskt Riktmedel, optical sight. This model is fitted with a Hensoldt 4×24 telescopic sight mounted via a HK claw mount. During a few years it was not issued but it is now again in use by the Hemvärnet - Nationella skyddsstyrkorna ("Swedish Home Guard").
- Ak 4B: In this updated version the iron sights have been removed and replaced with an Aimpoint CS red-dot reflex sight mounted on a Picatinny rail. The rail is welded onto the rifle. Used by Hemvärnet - Nationella skyddsstyrkorna ("Swedish Home Guard").
- Ak 4C: An updated version of the Ak 4B with an adjustable-length stock designed and manufactured by the Swedish company Spuhr i Dalby AB. Fielded in 2017 and used by Hemvärnet - Nationella skyddsstyrkorna ("Swedish Home Guard").
- Ak 4D: An updated version of the Ak 4B with the adjustable-length stock of the Ak 4C but with the addition of a modular handguard (also designed and manufactured by the Swedish company Spuhr i Dalby AB) and the Hensoldt 4×24 telescopic sight of the Ak 4OR in a Picatinny mount. The Ak 4D will be used by the Swedish Army as a stop-gap DMR.

==== Iran ====
- DIO G3-A3 Bullpup: Iranian bullpup variant of the G3.

==== Pakistan ====
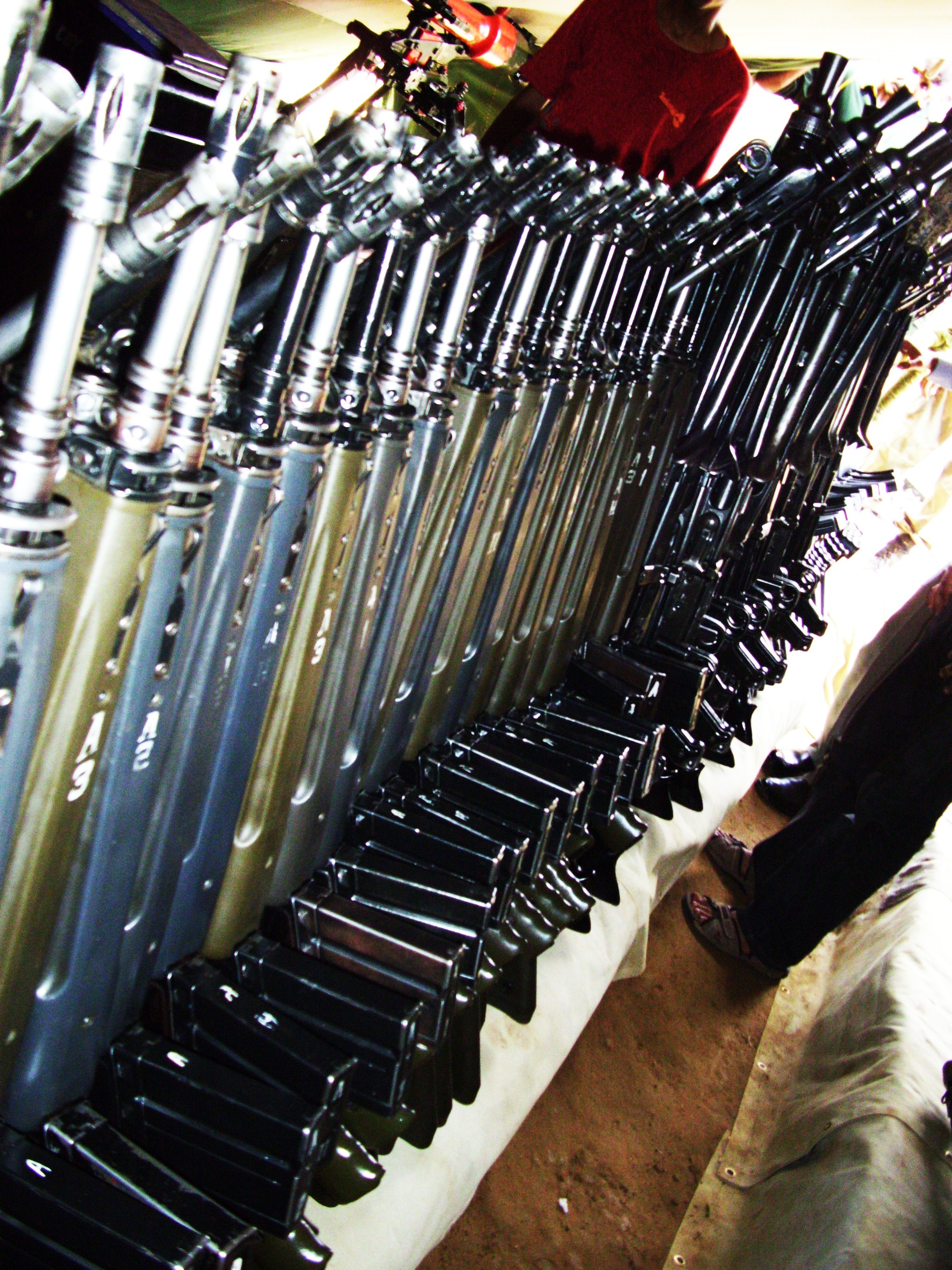
G3s made in Pakistan under license

The Pakistani models are manufactured in both automatic and civilian semi-automatic versions sharing the same model number.

- G3A3: Pakistan Ordnance Factories designation for license-produced G3A3 rifles. Manufactured in two different versions; automatic or semi-automatic.
- G3P4: Pakistan Ordnance Factories designation for license-produced G3A4 rifles. Manufactured in two different versions; automatic or semi-automatic.
- G3S: A version of G3P3 with a shorter barrel. Manufactured in two different versions; automatic or semi-automatic.
- G3M-Tactical: A lightweight version of G3 rifle with polymer body and shorter barrel. Manufactured in two different versions; automatic or semi-automatic.
- AZB (DMR): A high-precision version of G3 rifle with extended barrel length and mill std. Picatinny rail as rifle scope mount. Manufactured in two different versions; automatic or semi-automatic.

==== United Kingdom ====
- F.R. Ordnance MC51 Machine Carbine: Produced by the United Kingdom firm F.R. Ordnance International Ltd. The MC51 weighs 3.1 kg (6.8 lb), has a folded overall length of 625 mm (24.6 in), a barrel length of only 230 mm (9.1 in), which produces a muzzle velocity of approx. 690 m/s (2,263.8 ft/s) and a muzzle energy of 2215 J. Another UK-based company called Imperial Defence Services Ltd. absorbed FR Ordnance and continues to market the MC51 standard variant.

=== Specialized G3 types ===
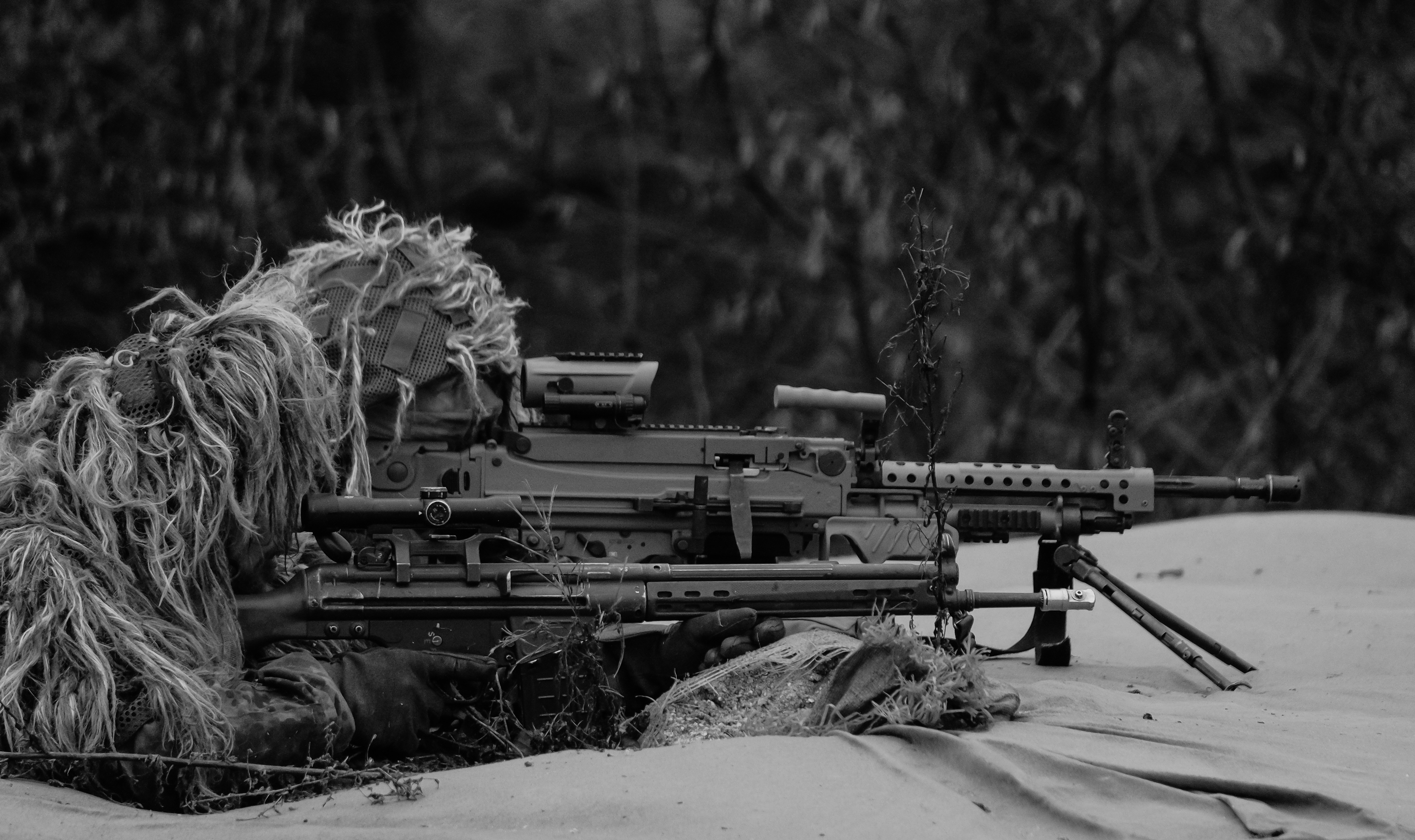
German designated marksman (front) with G3A3ZF in 2019

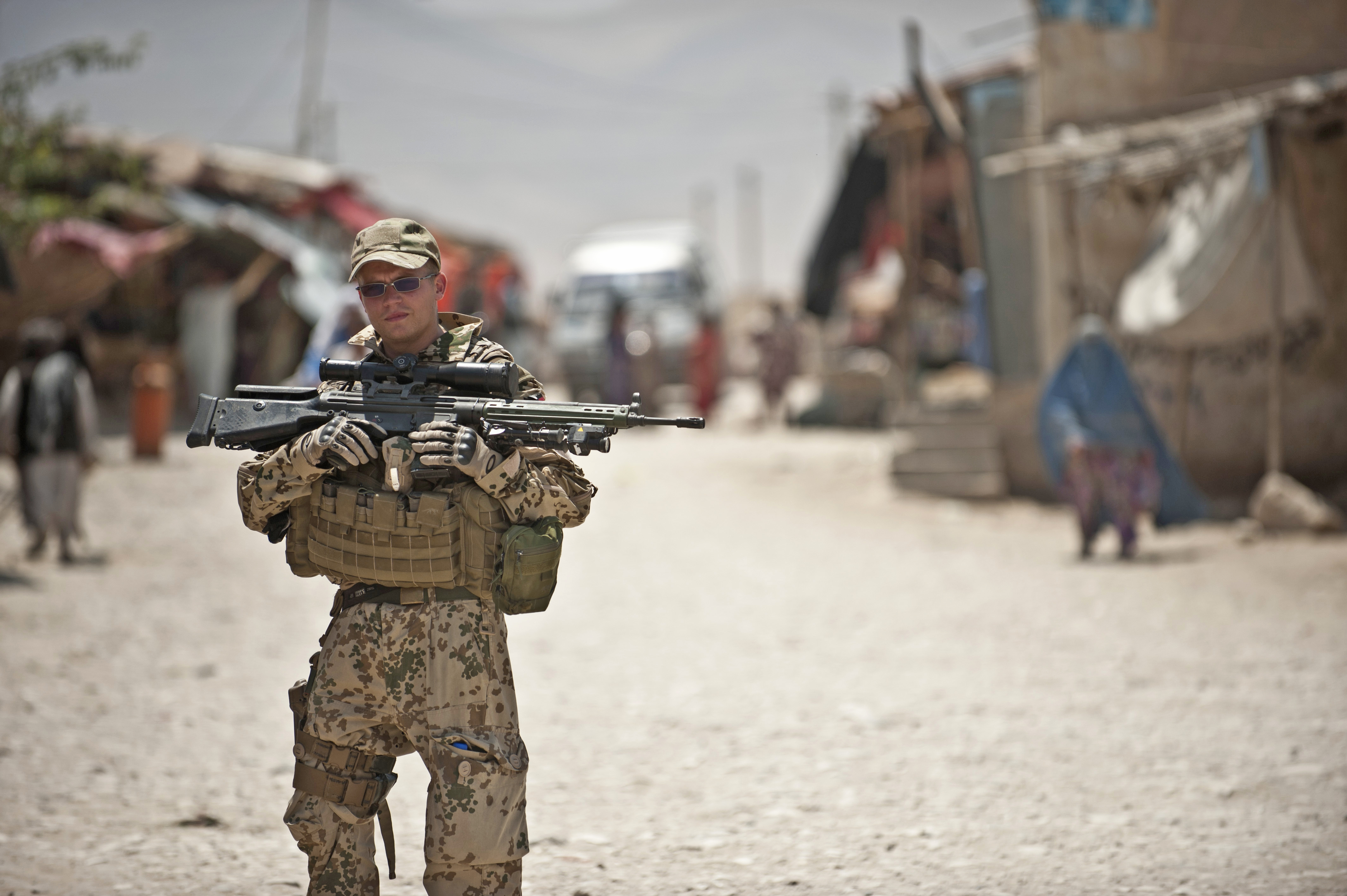
German sniper with a modernized G3A3ZF with a STANAG claw mounted Schmidt & Bender 3-12x50 PM II telescopic sight in Afghanistan in 2011

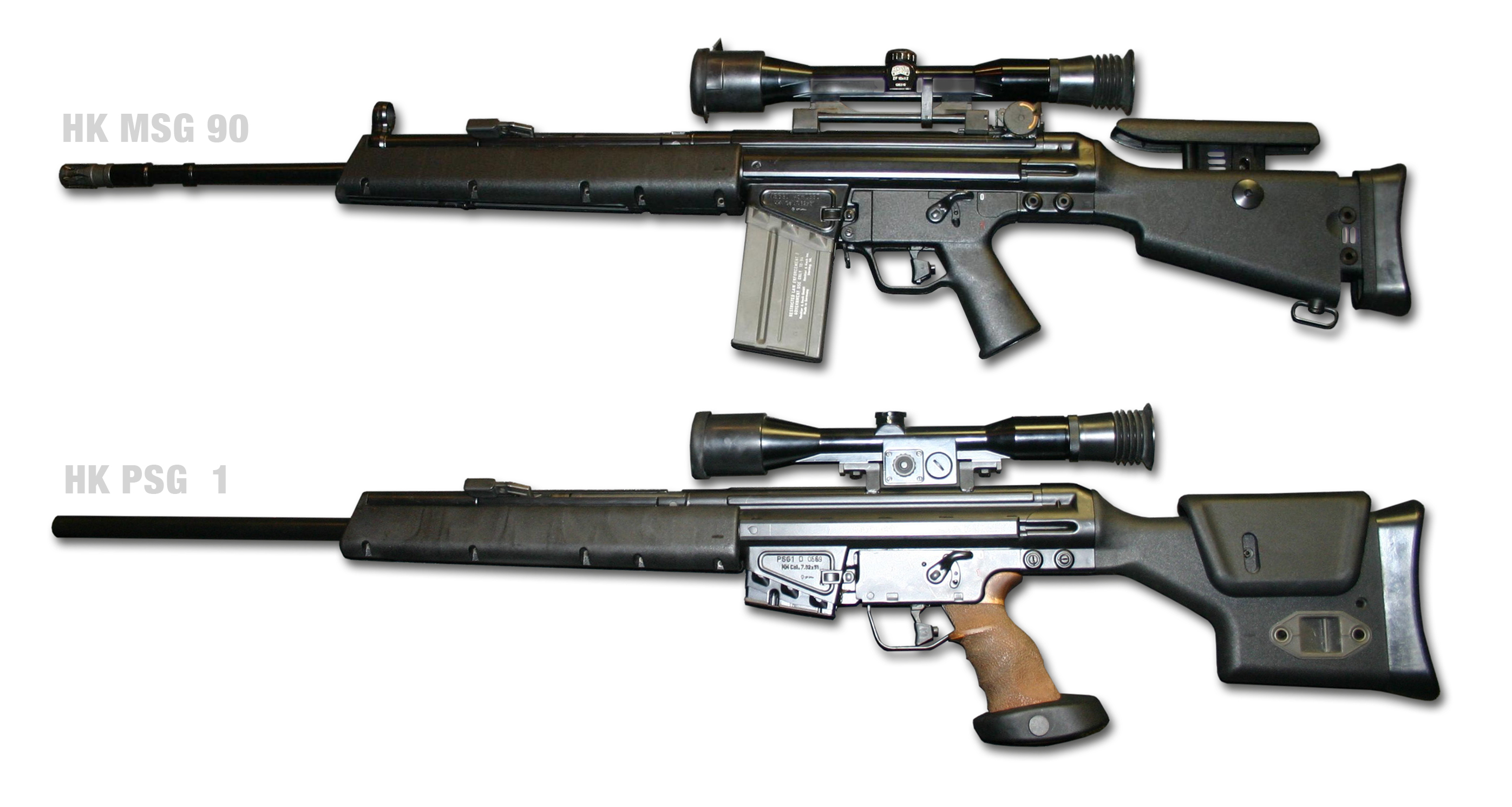
MSG90 (top) and PSG1

- G3TGS: This is simply a G3 with a 40 mm HK79 under-barrel grenade launcher. TGS stands for Tragbares Granat System ("portable grenade system").
- G3A3ZF: This is a rifle issued with a STANAG claw-and rail scope bracket and a Hensoldt Fero Z24 4×24 telescopic sight to be mounted and zeroed by the user. The ZF stands for Zielfernrohr ("Telescopic Sight"). The Hensoldt Fero Z24 4×24 telescope sight for G3 rifle and claw mount assembly were developed for designated marksman use. The Fero Z24 elevation knob features Bullet Drop Compensation (BDC) settings for 100–600 metres (109–656 yd) in 100 metres (109 yd) increments calibrated for 7.62×51mm NATO ball ammunition. The G3A3ZF is otherwise a standard G3A3 that during factory test shooting printed a 5-shot group of 80 millimetres (3.1 in) (0.8 mil/2.75 MOA) diameter or less.
- G3SG/1: A modified/accurized rifle for sharpshooter/sniper use introduced in 1972. The "SG" stands for Scharfschützengewehr ("Sharpshooting Rifle"). The rifles were individually selected from the G3 production line for outstanding accuracy during test-firing and then modified. G3SG/1 rifles got a heavy, dual-stage buffer, fixed mounted, Zeiss Diavari-DA 1.5-6×36 power telescopic sight and STANAG claw mount assembly mounted. The standard trigger was exchanged for an adjustable set-trigger pack assembly with a 25 N (5.6 lb_{f}) trigger pull and 12.5 N (2.8 lb_{f}) in the set operation mode, the buttstock has a slightly adjustable auxiliary cheek riser, and the lengthened handguard has an integrated bipod. The Zeiss Diavari-DA 1.5-6×36 was windage adjustable and had an elevation knob featuring Bullet Drop Compensation (BDC) settings for 10–600 metres (11–656 yd). For the sub 100 metres (109 yd) ranges the BDC numbers are yellow. The BDC numbers for the longer ranges are white and in 100 metres (109 yd) increments. The automatic fire mode was retained but the set-trigger mode could only be used for semi-automatic firing.
- MSG3: A variant introduced in 1988 featuring a 600 millimetres (23.6 in) long barrel, a newer telescopic sight mount that is found on only a few of the Heckler & Koch rifles, as compared to the more conventional claw mounts, though the claw mounting points remain on the receiver. This newer telescopic sight mount does not allow the use of the open sights with the mount in place, as is the case with the more conventional claw mount. The receiver is not strengthened. In addition to the G3SG/1 the buttstock has an auxiliary cheek riser and its length is adjustable and features the PSG1 semi-automatic only trigger pack. MSG stands for Militärisches Scharfschützen Gewehr ("Military Sniper Rifle").
- MSG90: A somewhat cheaper and lighter 600 millimetres (23.6 in) long barrel version of the PSG1 modified for military sniping/designated marksman applications. The MSG90 and PSG1 have different trigger packs.
- PSG1: A free-floating 650 millimetres (25.6 in) long barrel semi-automatic only version of the G3 introduced in 1985 with a strengthened receiver with rails welded over the channels where a retractable buttstock would slide and numerous other upgrades and such to meet the necessities of police sniper units. This rifle is famous for its accuracy and comfort, but infamous for its price and inability to be deployed by military units because some upgrades made the rifle too fragile. PSG stands for Präzisionsscharfschützengewehr ("Precision Sniper Rifle").
- HK32: An experimental variant of the rifle chambered for the Soviet 7.62×39mm M43 cartridge. It was never wholly adopted by any country. (Note: At least one example seen used by Mexican police.)

=== Law enforcement and civilian models ===
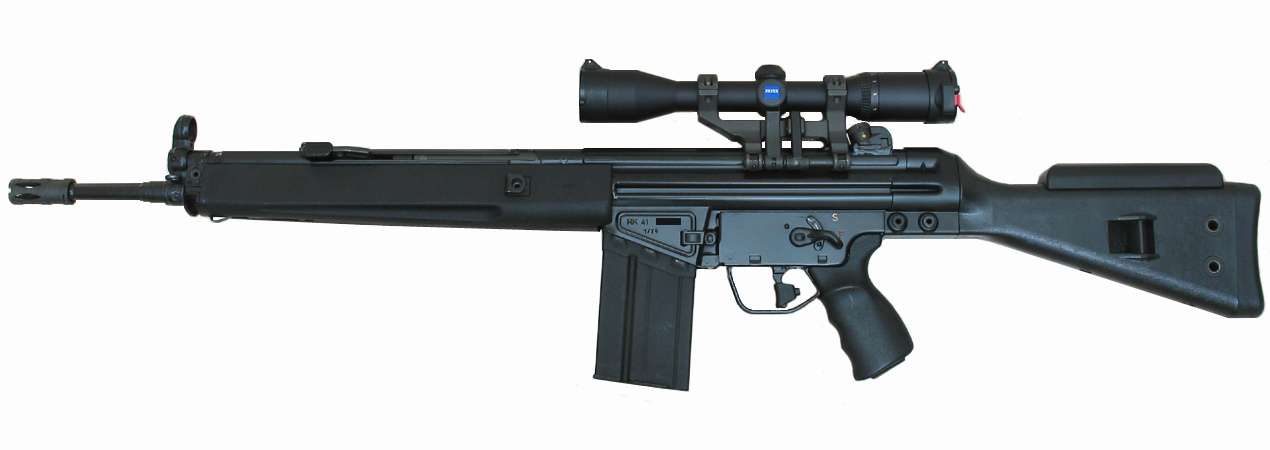
HK41.

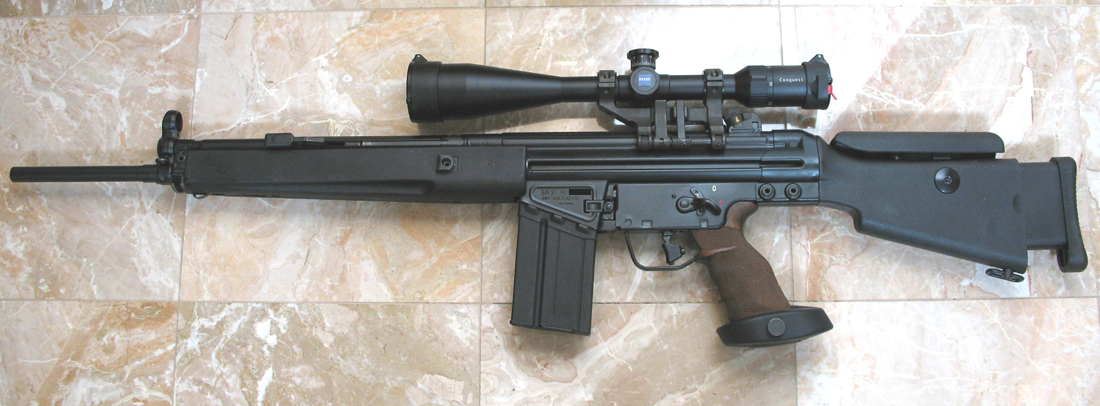
SR9.

- G3A1*: The terminology used by custom gunsmiths (e.g., Choate) and importers (e.g., Interarms) for imported semi-automatic G3 weapons with an aftermarket side-folding stock. This is not part of official HK nomenclature.
- HK41: The HK41 is a semi-automatic version of the G3 that was marketed to law-enforcement. Limited sales at home and US import restrictions and firearms regulations led this weapon to be dropped from HK's product line quickly and it was replaced by the HK91.
- Fleming Arms HK51: Contrary to popular belief, the HK51 is not made by H&K, being a creation of the American Class II manufacturing after-market. The HK51 has no real standards, but is usually a cut down and modified G3A3, or its semi-automatic clones the HK41 and HK91, modified to take MP5 stock and accessories. It is usually fitted with a collapsible stock; with a 211 mm (8.31-inch) long barrel; it is relatively small at 589 mm (23.17 inches) with the stock retracted and 780 mm (30.72 inches) with the stock extended. The first commercial version was by Bill Fleming of Fleming Arms and existed before Heckler & Koch made the HK53.
- HK91: The HK91 is a semi-automatic version of the G3 similar to the HK41, also marketed to civilians. However, in order to comply with US firearm regulations a number of modifications to the HK91 were made that do not appear on the first pattern HK41. Internal parts that could allow fully automatic fire were removed. A shelf was welded onto the receiver where the push-pin of the trigger pack would normally go, to prevent installation of a fully automatic trigger pack. This did not allow the use of the paddle style magazine release and so the magazine release button on the right side of the magazine well must be used instead. It is otherwise identical to the G3A3/A4. Importation into the United States began in 1974 and ceased in 1989, with some 48,000 rifles being imported.
- HK911: The HK911 was an HK91A2 with the flash hider removed and the receiver re-stamped with an extra 1 to comply with the US importation ban of 1989. The new designation theoretically made it legally immune to the Import Ban, as no "HK911" rifles were mentioned on the list of banned guns. However, the later banning of several "paramilitary" features on the HK911 made it illegal.
- SR9: These variants of the HK91ZF were created to comply with the Semi-Auto Import Ban of 1989, which included all variants of the HK91. They differed from the HK91 in that they had their flash hiders removed and featured a smooth forend that lacked the bipod attachment point. The SR9 series were banned from importation to the United States because they could accept standard-capacity magazines. The SR9 was an HK91A2ZF with the pistol grip and buttstock replaced with a one-piece thumbhole stock.
  - SR9 (T): The (T), or "Target", model was an HK91A2ZF with the trigger replaced with the PSG-1 model, the pistol grip replaced with an ergonomic PSG-1 grip and the buttstock replaced with an MSG90 model.
  - SR9 (TC): The (TC), or "Target Competition", model was an HK91A2ZF with the trigger group, pistol grip and buttstock derived from the PSG-1.

==== Other manufacturers ====
- PTR Industries 91 Series: PTR Industries is manufacturing semi-automatic copies of the HK G3 called the PTR 91. They use tooling from the FMP arms factory in Portugal to build the rifles.
- Century International Arms: Century Arms builds a clone of the G3 under the designation CA-3.
- SAR-3: Semi-automatic copy of the HK-91 made by Hellenic Defence Systems in Greece and imported into the United States by Springfield Armory.
  - SAR-8: Post-ban version of SAR-3, modified with a thumbhole stock and shipped with 10-round magazines to comply with import restrictions.
- Schwaben Arms: Civilian clones for the German market called M41.
- MKE: MKEK made a clone known as the T41.
- Hunt Group Arms G12: Turkish made 12-gauge designed as a 1:1 external clone of the G3 rifle for civilian, sporting and law enforcement use.
- LuxDefTec: Luxembourgish clones of the G3 designated HSG41.

== Users ==
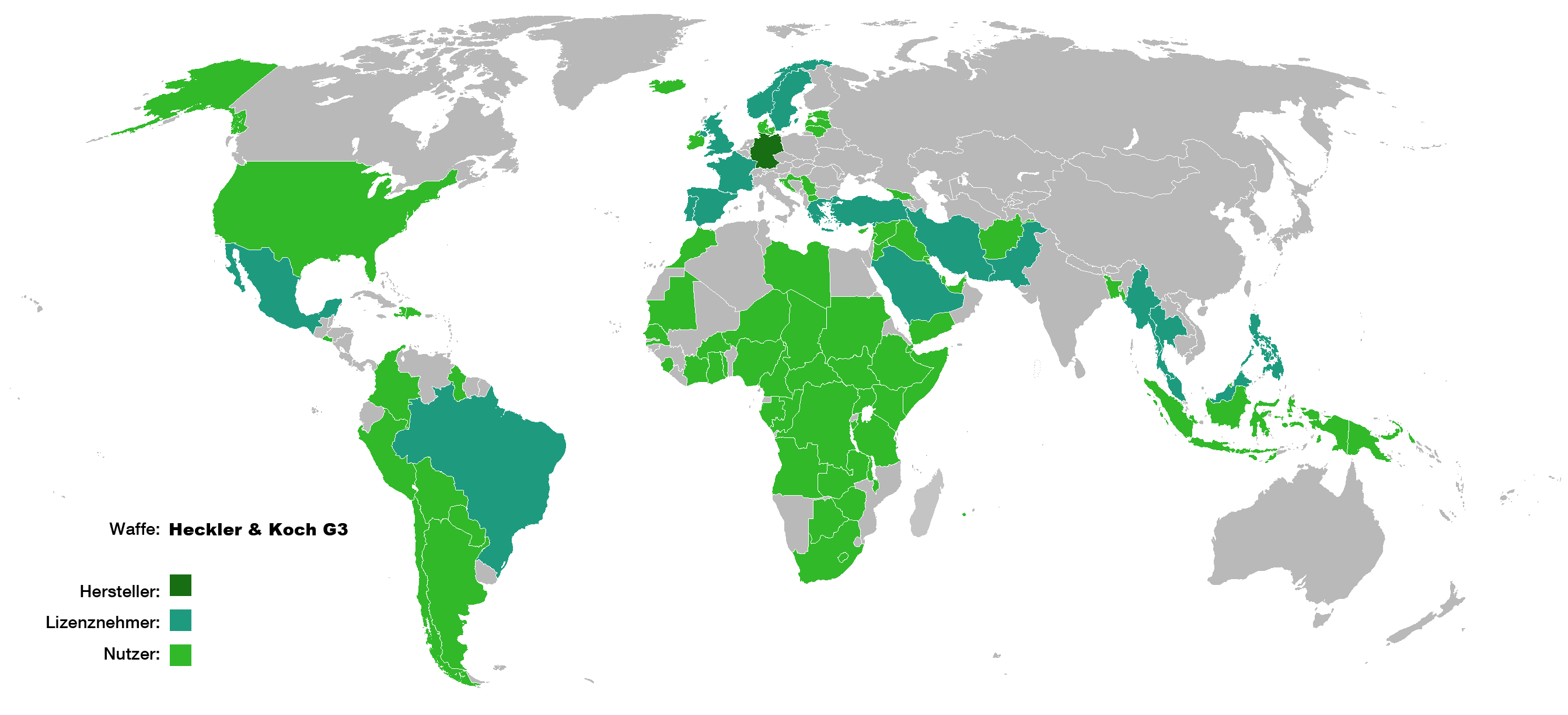
G3 producers (Germany), licensees and users

=== Active ===
- Afghanistan: Iranian and Turkish-made G3s.
- Angola
- Argentina: Grupo Halcón (Buenos Aires Police SWAT).
- Bahrain
- Bangladesh: G3A3, G3A4 & G3/SG-1 variants are in service.
- Brazil: Seized rifles used in limited numbers by the Rio de Janeiro Civil Police. G3A3, G3A4 and G3SG1 used by special forces. G3A4 and G3SG1 used by police forces. G3SG1 used by BOPE.
- Bolivia
- Botswana
- Brunei
- Burkina Faso: French-made G3s.
- Burundi
- Cameroon
- Chad
- Central African Republic
- Chile
- Republic of the Congo: Used by Cocoye militia during Congo Civil War
- Cyprus
- Djibouti
- Dominican Republic
- El Salvador
- Estonia: Uses the Ak4 and AG-3F2 variant.
- Ethiopia
- Gabon: French-made G3s.
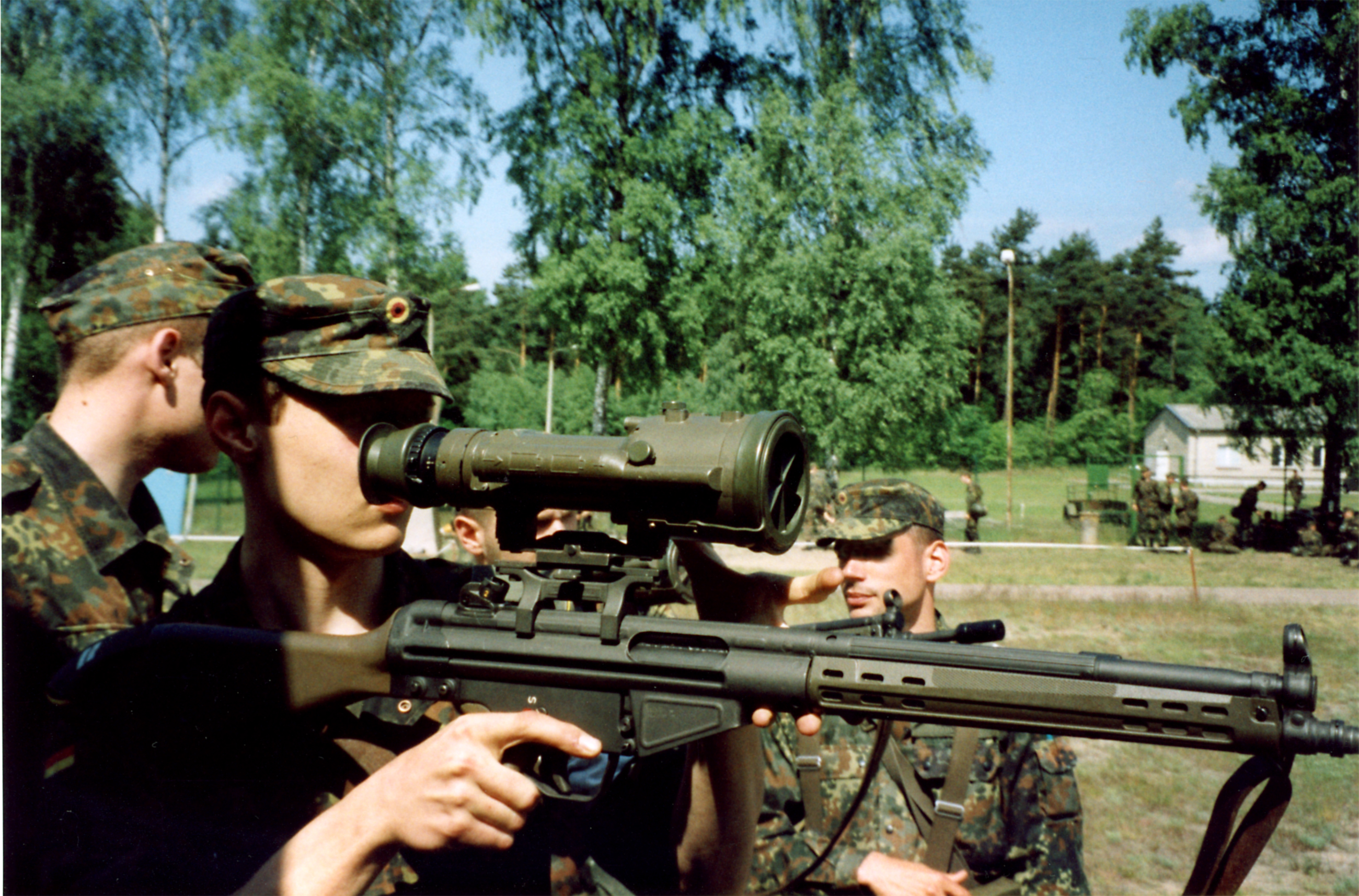
- A Bundeswehr G3 fitted with a FERO-Z51 night vision optic
  Germany: Used by the German Army from the 1950s until the mid-1990s as the primary service rifle. Originally to be replaced by the HK G41 and HK G11, post-reunification budget cuts forced the procurement of the HK G36 instead. Large numbers are still in storage, and is used in overseas deployments as a designated marksman rifle. Some variants are still in use by border guards and police forces.
- Ghana
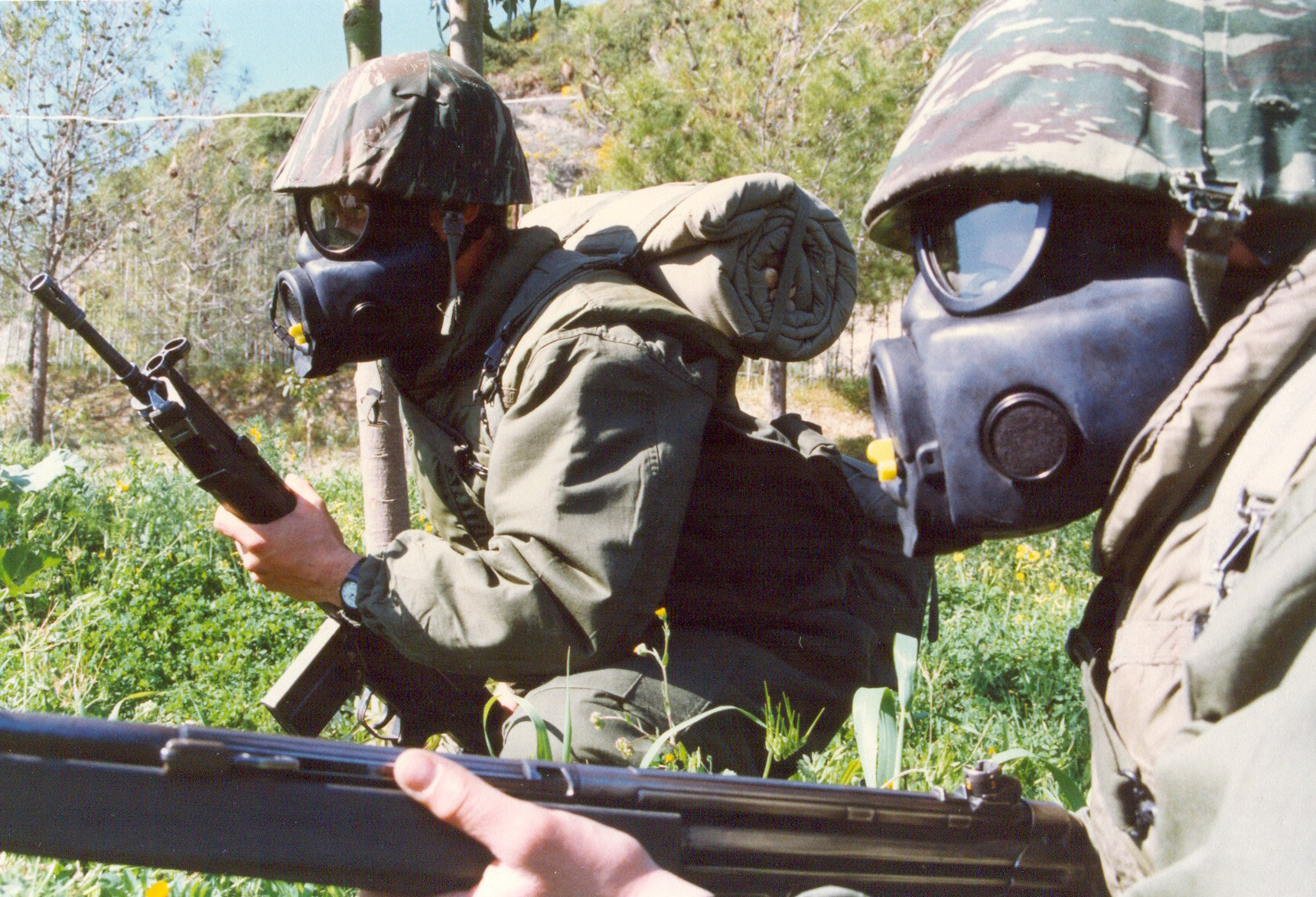
  Greek soldiers in NBC gear with Greek-made G3s
- Greece: The HK G3A3 replaced the American M1 Garand in the late 1970s and manufactured under license by Hellenic Defence Systems.
- Guyana
- Haiti
- Iceland: AG-3 supplied from Norway.

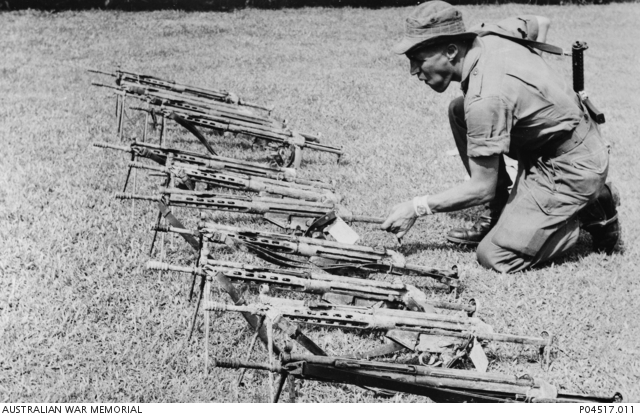
A Commonwealth soldier examines rows of captured Indonesian Rheinmetall G3s during the Konfrontasi.

- Indonesia: The Kopasgat corps of Indonesian Air Force used the Rheinmetall G3 as their standard weapon since the early 1960s during Operation Trikora campaign in Western New Guinea conflict. The Rheinmetall G3 is currently used in reserve and training units. The Kostrad corps of the Indonesian Army used G3/SG-1. During the Indonesian occupation of East Timor, the Indonesian Army used captured Portuguese G3A3 taken from FALINTIL forces.
- Iran: Manufactured locally by Defense Industries Organization as the G3A6. A bullpup variant is called the G3-A3.
- Iraq
  - Kurdistan: 8,000 rifles
- Ireland
- Ivory Coast: French-made G3s
- Jordan
- Kenya
- Kuwait
- Latvia: Ak4 variant used by National Guard, Being replaced by G36.
- Lebanon: French-made G3s.
- Libya
- Lithuania: Ak4 variant was used by the Lithuanian Armed Forces. and Lithuanian National Defence Volunteer Forces.
- Malawi
- Malaysia: The Malaysian Army and Royal Malaysia Police used the G3A4 as their standard weapon along with HK33 since the early 1970s during Communist insurgency in Malaysia (1968–89). The G3/SG-1 used by the sniper teams of both the military and police special forces. It was replaced by the Colt M16A1. The G3/SG-1 is currently used in reserve and paramilitary units
- Mauritania – French-made G3s.
- Mauritius: Former main battle rifle of the Military of Mauritius. Kept in reserve for training. Still in use in limited amount with the anti-riot police.
- Mexico: Made under license by Departamento de la Industria Militar, Dirección General de Fábricas de la Defensa, slowly being replaced by the FX-05 Xiuhcoatl.
- Morocco
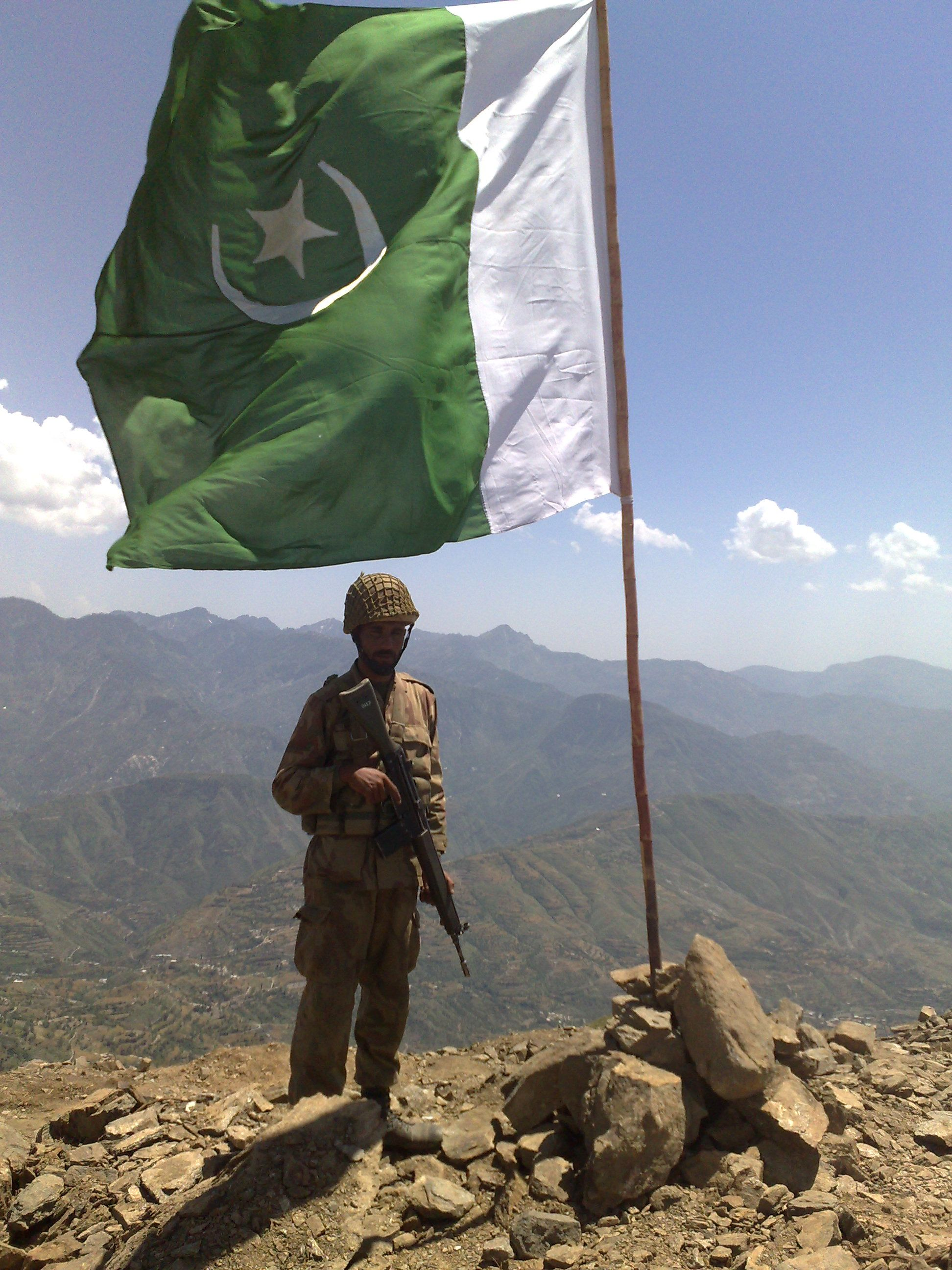
  Pakistani soldier carrying the G3A3 variant after successful Swat Operation at the highest point in the Swat valley on May 12, 2009
- Myanmar
- Niger: French-made G3s
- Nigeria: Produced under license by Defense Industries Corporation.
- Pakistan: Locally produced by Pakistan Ordnance Factories in G3P4 designation.
- Papua New Guinea
- Paraguay
- Peru
- Philippines
- Portugal: Starting in 1962, it was made in Portugal under license by the Fábrica do Braço de Prata. The Portuguese Marine Corps use a modernized version of the G3A3/A4 with kit Spuhr and Aimpoint CompM4 red dot sight.
- Qatar
- Romania
- Rwanda
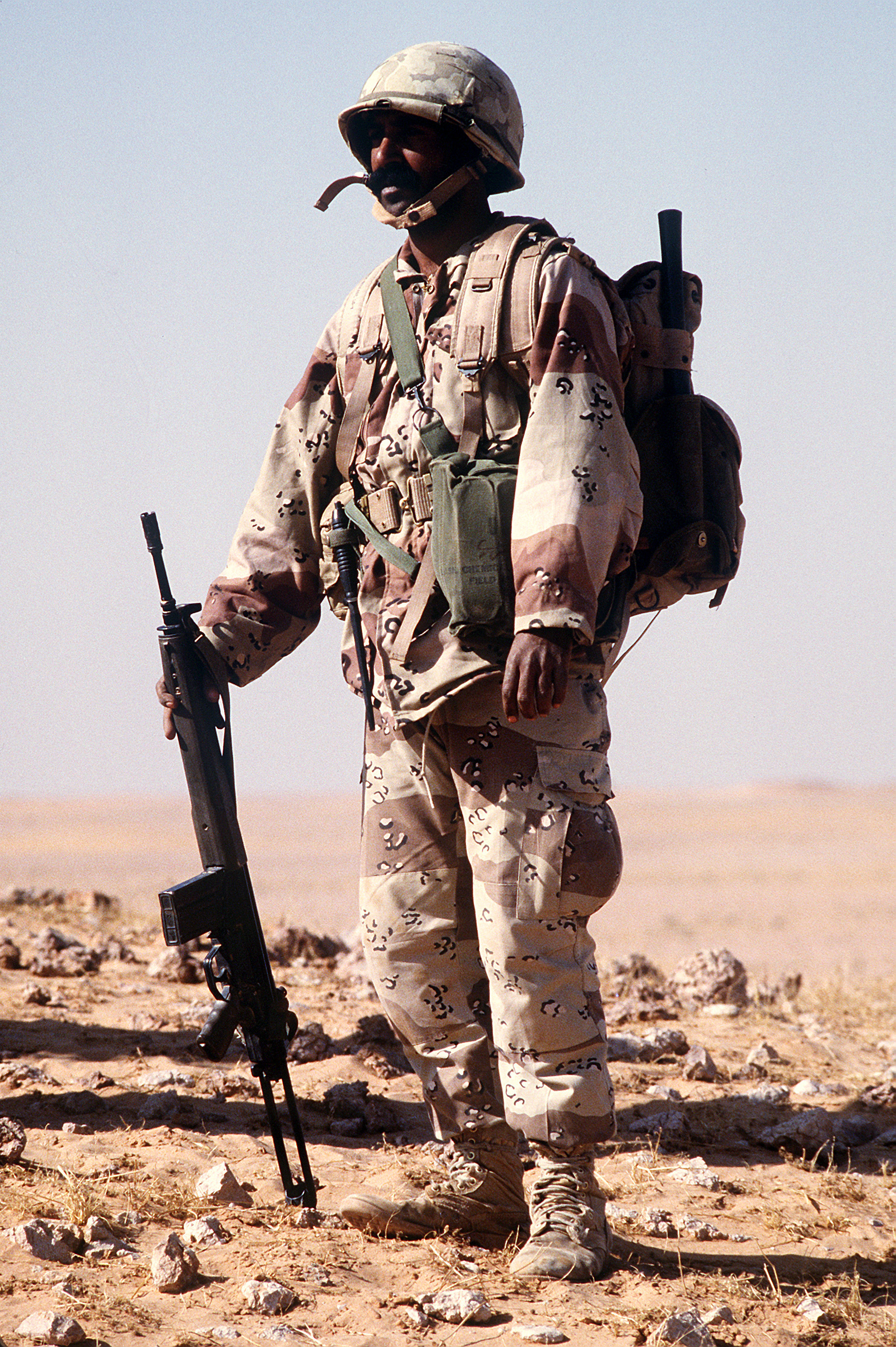
- A Saudi Arabian soldier with a G3A4 during Operation Desert Shield
  Saudi Arabia: Made under license by the Military Industries Corporation, General Organization for Military Industries in Alkharj.
- Sierra Leone: 8,000 received from the UK and Nigeria during the 1970s and the 1980s. Some Iranian-made G3s have also been recovered.
- Somaliland G3
- Somalia
- Senegal – French-made G3s
- Serbia: Used by Special Forces
- South Africa: Used by Special Forces
- Sudan: Made under license by Military Industry Corporation as the Dinar
- Sweden: Made by three manufacturers, Heckler & Koch in Germany, and under license by Husqvarna Vapenfabrik (1965–70) and Carl Gustaf Gevärsfaktori (1965–80) which was later renamed to Förenade Fabriksverken (FFV) as the Ak 4 (Automatkarbin 4). Two sub-variants are known to exist, one equipped with a rail and Aimpoint sight (Ak4 B) and the other with a 4× magnifying optic, the Hensoldt ZF4×24 (Ak 4OR). Since then the majority of the swedish army have replaced it with the Ak 5 (Automatkarbin 5; a modified version of the FN FNC) in the regular army. Ak 4B and Ak 4OR, some times in combination with the M203 grenade launcher, is still in use in Hemvärnet – Nationella skyddsstyrkorna and a few newly restarted regiments ("Swedish Home Guard"). About 5,000 units will receive a new adjustable stock from 2016. In December 2020, Tidningen Hemvärnet announced that every soldier in the Home Guard would receive the new adjustable stock AK4C variant before the end of 2022.
- Syria
- Tanzania
- Togo

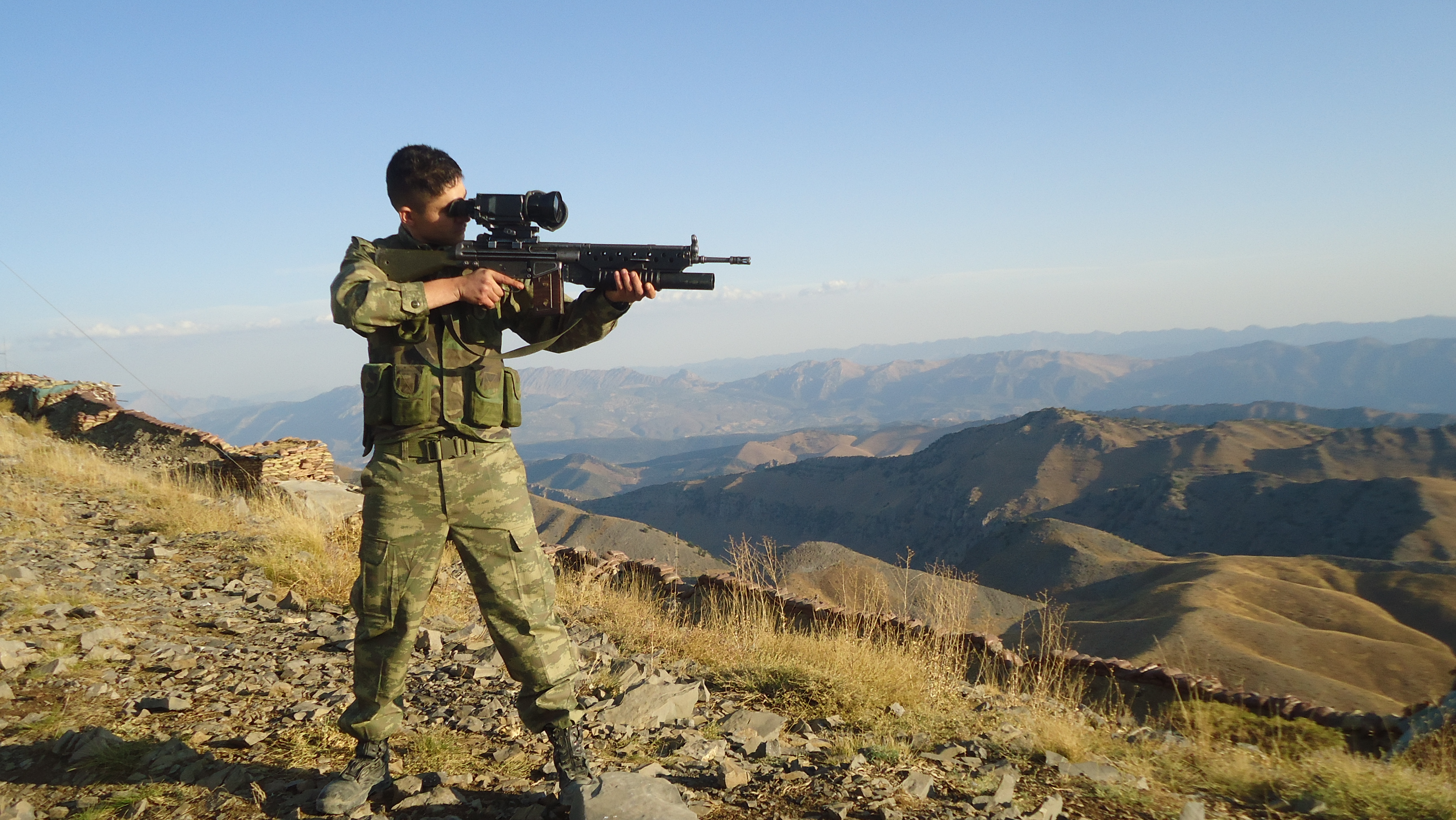
A Turkish Land Forces officer using G3A7 with Engerek 3+ and T-40 grenade launcher in Northern Iraq

- Turkey: Made under license by Makina ve Kimya Endüstrisi Kurumu (MKEK) ("Mechanical and Chemical Industry Corporation") as the G3A7 and G3A7A1. A local version called the M65 was produced between 1966 and 1983. During the 1980s it was gradually replaced by the M79, a locally produced version of the HK-33 assault rifle.
- Uganda
- Ukraine: 1,000 G3A3/4s sent by Portugal as part of a military package in response to the 2022 Russian invasion of Ukraine. The number of G3s sent was revealed in an interview with Commander Silva Pinto held during the military parade on Portugal Day. G3s provided in 2025 as military assistance, in use by Ukrainian National Guard.
- United Arab Emirates
- United Kingdom: Many versions of the G3 were used by the SAS and UKSF like the G3K and MC51. The G3KA4 was designated L100A1 by the British Army.
- Yemen: Yemeni Republican Guard and the Yemeni Special guard.
- Zambia
- Zimbabwe

=== Former ===
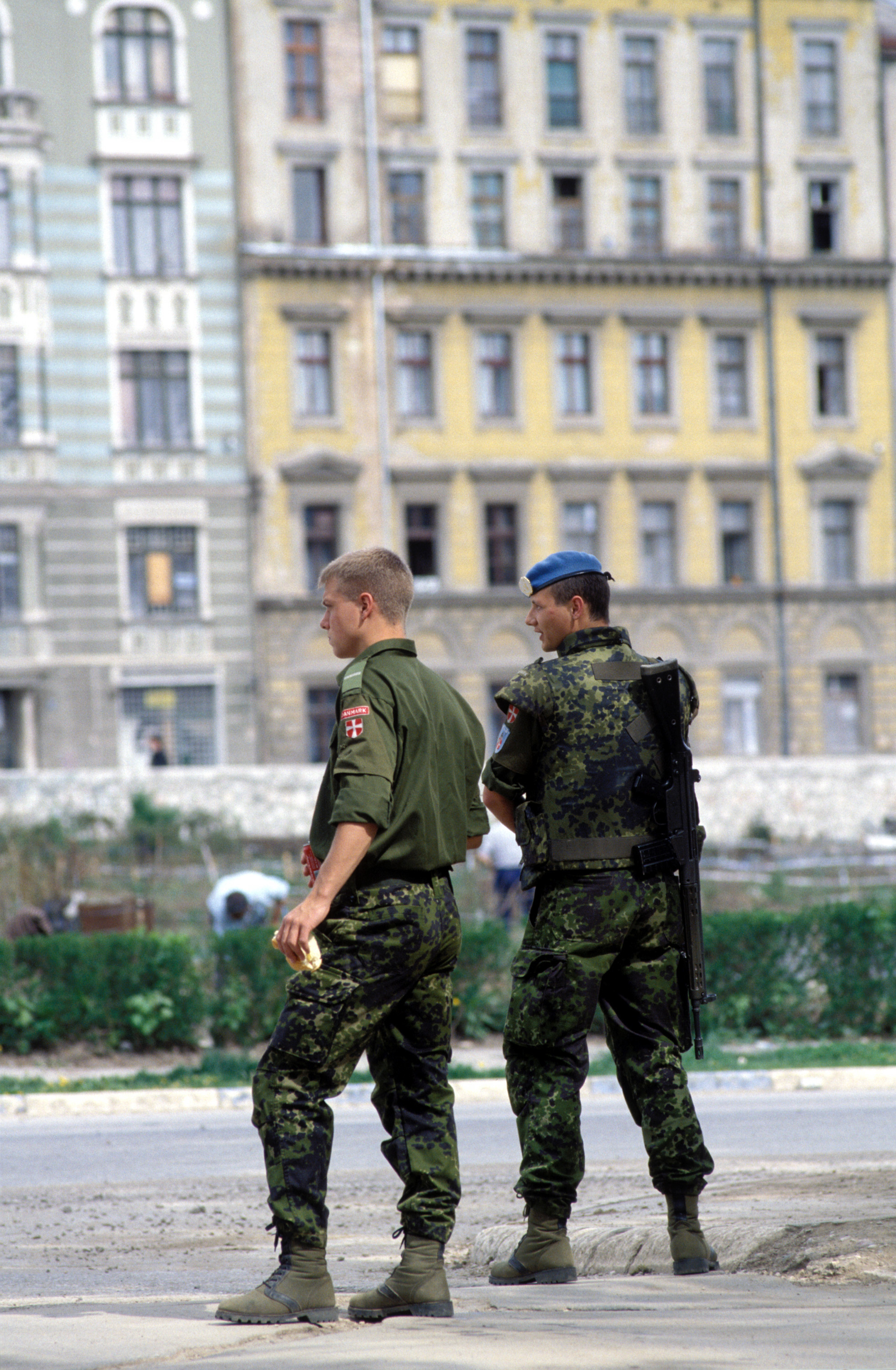
Danish soldiers carrying the G3A5 variant.

- Bosnia and Herzegovina
- Colombia: Originally in 1975, Heckler and Koch sold to Indumil the manufacturing license for the G3, the MP5 submachine gun, and the HK21 machine gun. Replaced in service by IMI Galil.
- Denmark: G3A5, as the Gevær Model 1966 (Gv M/66). Another variant, designated Gevær Model 1975 (Gv M/75) was leased from the German government. All G3s in Danish service are being replaced by the Diemaco C7 (Gv m/95), and Diemaco C8 (Gv m/96).
- East Timor: Inherited the Portuguese G3A3 from the FALINTIL.
- Georgia: Turkish made G3s used by Special Forces.
- Lesotho
- Norway: Locally produced variant designated AG-3. In service with the Norwegian Army from 1968 to 2008. Phased out in the Home Guard (HV), HVU units in 2021.
- Portugal: G3A3 and A4 versions. The G3 was the standard-issued rifle of the Portuguese Army from 1963 to 2020, manufactured under license by Fábrica de Braço de Prata before it shut down. In 2019, it was replaced by FN SCAR L rifles.
- Rhodesia: Portuguese built G3s were used by auxiliary or reserve units of the Rhodesian Security Forces
- South Africa: 100,000 FMP-manufactured surplus G3 rifles were bought from Portugal and designated the R2 Rifle. It was the standard-issue rifle of the South African Marine Corps and South African Air Force, as well within the South West African Territorial Force as a substitute for the R1 Rifle (FN FAL) until it was replaced by the R4 assault rifle in the 1980s The rifle's stock would soon break down in the heat and become loose, so a replacement stock made of a tough polymer was made by Choate Machine & Tool. The forend had recesses for a bipod's legs and the FAL-style polymer buttstock had a rubber buttplate.
- United States Used by the US Army Rangers in the mid-1970s and by the US Navy Seals from 1980. NSN 1005-12-140-9436
- Zaire

=== Non-state users ===
- Democratic Forces for the Liberation of Rwanda (in Democratic Republic of Congo)
- Armed Forces for the National Liberation of East Timor (FALINTIL)
- Provisional IRA: 100 stolen from Norwegian Reserve base near Oslo, 1984.
- ISIL
- Lord Resistance Army
- People's Movement for the Liberation of Azawad
- Pro-Indonesia militias in East Timor
- Revolutionary United Front
- Revolutionary Organization 17 November
- Timorese Democratic Union (UDT)
- Mexican cartels
- Comando Vermelho: 12 Apprehended during Operation Containment

== Conflicts ==
=== 1960s ===
- Internal conflict in Myanmar (1948–present)
- First Sudanese Civil War (1955–1972)
- Congo Crisis (1960–1965)
- Portuguese Colonial War (1961–1974)
- Papua conflict (1962–present)
- Indonesia–Malaysia confrontation (1963–1966)
- The Troubles (Late 1960s–1998)
- Colombian conflict (1964–present)
- Rhodesian Bush War (1964–1979)
- Indo-Pakistani War of 1965 (1965)
- South African Border War (1966–1990)
- Nigerian Civil War (1967–1970)
- Football War (1969)

=== 1970s ===
- Bangladesh Liberation War (1971)
- Indo-Pakistani War of 1971 (1971)
- Ethiopian Civil War (1974–1991)
- East Timorese civil war (1975)
- Indonesian occupation of East Timor (1975–1999)
- Lebanese Civil War (1975–1990)
- Uganda–Tanzania War (1978–1979)
- Nicaraguan Revolution (1978–1990)
- Kurdish–Turkish conflict (1978–present)
- Salvadoran Civil War (1979–1992)

=== 1980s ===
- Iran–Iraq War (1980–1988)
- Seychelles coup d'état attempt (1981)
- Second Sudanese Civil War (1983–2005)
- Lord's Resistance Army insurgency (1987–present)
- First Liberian Civil War (1989–1997)

=== 1990s ===
- Tuareg rebellion (1990–1995)
- Gulf War (1990–1991); saw limited combat use
- Yugoslav Wars (1991–2001)
- Sierra Leone Civil War (1991-2002)
- Republic of the Congo Civil War (1997–1999)
- 1999 East Timorese crisis
- Kargil War (1999)

=== 2000s ===
- War in Afghanistan (2001–2021)
- Iraq War (2003–2011)
- Kivu conflict (2004–present)
- Insurgency in Khyber Pakhtunkhwa (2004–present)
- Somali Civil War (2009–present)

=== 2010s ===
- Militias-Comando Vermelho Conflict (2010–present)
- Libyan conflict (2011–present)
- Syrian Civil War (2011–present)
- South Sudanese Civil War (2013–2020)
- Yemeni Civil War (2014–present)

=== 2020s ===
- Myanmar civil war (2021–present)
- Russo-Ukrainian War
  - Russian invasion of Ukraine (2022–present)
