= Transvaro =

Transvaro, also known as Transvaro Electron Tools Inc. and Trade Inc. (Elektron Aletleri Sanayi ve Ticaret A.S. in Turkish), is an electronics and electro-optics company that was established in 1988 as a joint venture. In 1995, it became 100% Turkish-owned company. Its production plant in Istanbul, covers an area of 5000 square meters.

Transvaro specializes in the provision of products and systems for the Turkish Army and security forces. These include image-intensifying night-vision equipment, turnkey simulation systems/centers, IR/laser equipment, electronic/electro-optical systems, electronic time fuses, electronic time setters, message terminal units, and minimum metal detectors.

The company's system has been evaluated and certified by ABS Quality Evaluations (ABS QE) and the Ministry of National Defence Quality Management Department. Additionally, it has been awarded a secretary-level factory security certificate by the Ministry of National Defence.

Transvaro is Turkey's first night-vision periscope manufacturer with 100% Turkish capital. The company adheres to AQAP 2120 and ISO9001 standards in electronic and electro-optic equipment, as well as system design and production.

== Products ==
=== Military equipment ===
- Night vision devices, thermal cameras
- Mine detectors,
- Periscopes,
- Binocular and telescopes,
- Velocity radars,
- Message terminal units,
- Time fuses,
- Fuse setting devices,
- Target pointers,
- IR identification and communication devices

=== Security systems ===
- Camera control systems
- Access control systems
- Perimeter security systems
- X-Ray checking systems
- Fire alarm systems

=== Simulators ===
- Vehicle simulators
- Shooter training simulators
- Combat simulators

=== Civilian products ===
- Utility electricity counters
- Utility water counters
- Metal detectors
- Kiosks

== Contracting ==
Besides the business items forming the main components of electronic security systems specified in Transvaro's promotional document, for all systems relating to low current such as sound and announcement systems, fire control systems, central TV broadcasting systems, tape recorders, solutions compatible with all requirements of customers are currently developed and implemented.
