= 1950s in Angola =

Angola-related events during the 1950's

Angola in the 1950s transitioned from colonial to provincial status. Angola had the status of a Portuguese colony from 1655 until the Assembly of the Republic passed a law on June 11, 1951, giving all Portuguese colonies provincial status, effective on October 20, 1951. Separatist political organizations advocating Angolan independence formed in the 1950s despite strong resistance from the Portuguese government, leading to the Angolan War of Independence (1961–1975).

== Politics ==
Viriato da Cruz and others formed the Movement of Young Intellectuals, an organization that promoted Angolan culture, in 1948. Nationalists sent a letter to the United Nations calling for Angola to be given protectorate status under UN supervision. In 1953 Angolan nationalists founded the Party of the United Struggle for Africans in Angola (PLUAA), the first political party to advocate Angolan independence from Portugal. Two years later Mário Pinto de Andrade and his brother Joaquim formed the Angolan Communist Party (PCA). In December 1956 PLUAA merged with the PCA to form the Popular Movement for the Liberation of Angola (MPLA). The MPLA, led by da Cruz, Mário Andrade, Ilidio Machado, and Lúcio Lara, derived support from the Ambundu and in Luanda.

Congolese-Angolan nationalists formed the Union of Peoples of Northern Angola, which advocated the independence of the traditional Kingdom of Kongo, in 1954.

Portuguese police arrested Agostinho Neto of the MPLA and future President of Angola (1975–1979), in 1952 and again in 1955 for his involvement in the Portuguese Communist Party. He returned to Angola in 1959 and police arrested him again in 1960. Portuguese authorities arrested over 100 MPLA members in 1959.

== Economy ==
The Portuguese discovered petroleum in Angola in 1955. Production began in the Cuanza basin in the 1950s, in the Congo Basin in the 1960s, and in the exclave of Cabinda in 1968. The Belgian company Fina (today - 2007—a part of Total) was the first to be given a concession. The Portuguese colonial government granted operating rights for Block Zero to the Cabinda Gulf Oil Company (CABGOC), a subsidiary of the U.S. company Gulf Oil, now merged into ChevronTexaco, in 1955. The rate of Angola's economic expansion grew in the 1950s, but boomed in the 1960s as industries grew by an annual average rate of 17%. Today the petroleum industry is the engine of the Angolan economy.

After World War II, the Portuguese government encouraged citizens to move to Angola to compensate for unemployment. The white population in Angola increased from 79,000 in 1950 to 173,000 in 1960, with 55,000 living in Luanda alone.

== Establishments ==
Colonial authorities established the Institute of Angola at Luanda in 1952, the Garcia de Orta journal in 1953, Center of Historical Studies Overseas in 1955, the Center of Political and Social Studies in 1956, the Center of Scientific Records Overseas in 1957, and the Center of Missionary Studies in 1959.

== Colonial governors ==
1. José Agapito de Silva Carvalho, High Commissioner of Angola (1948–1955)
2. Manoel de Gusmão Mascarenhas Gaivão, High Commissioner of Angola (1955–1956)
3. Horácio José de Sá Viana Rebelo, High Commissioner of Angola (1956–1960)

== See also ==
- Portuguese West Africa
