= Angolan War of Independence =

1961–1974 armed conflict in Southwestern Africa

- Part of the Portuguese Colonial War, the decolonization of Africa and the Cold War
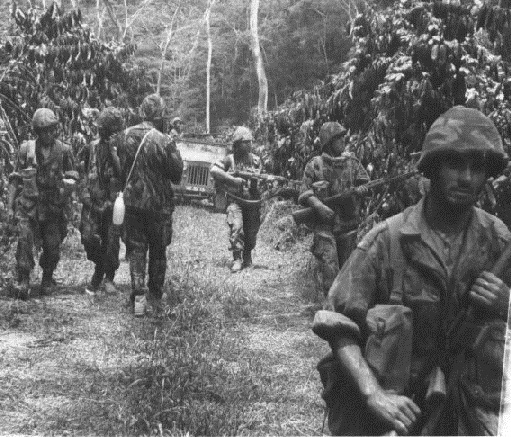
- Portuguese troops on patrol in Angola
Date	4 February 1961 – 25 April 1974 (13 years, 2 months and 3 weeks)
Location	Portuguese Angola
Result	Alvor Agreement
Territorial changes	Independence of Angola

Belligerents
Portugal	MPLA; FNLA; UNITA; FLEC

Commanders and leaders
António de O. Salazar; Francisco Gomes; Marcelo Caetano	Agostinho Neto; Lúcio Lara; Holden Roberto; Jonas Savimbi; Luís Ranque Franque

Strength
79,000	27,000

Casualties and losses
2,671 killed 11,067 wounded	10,000–25,000 killed
- 30,000–50,000 civilians killed

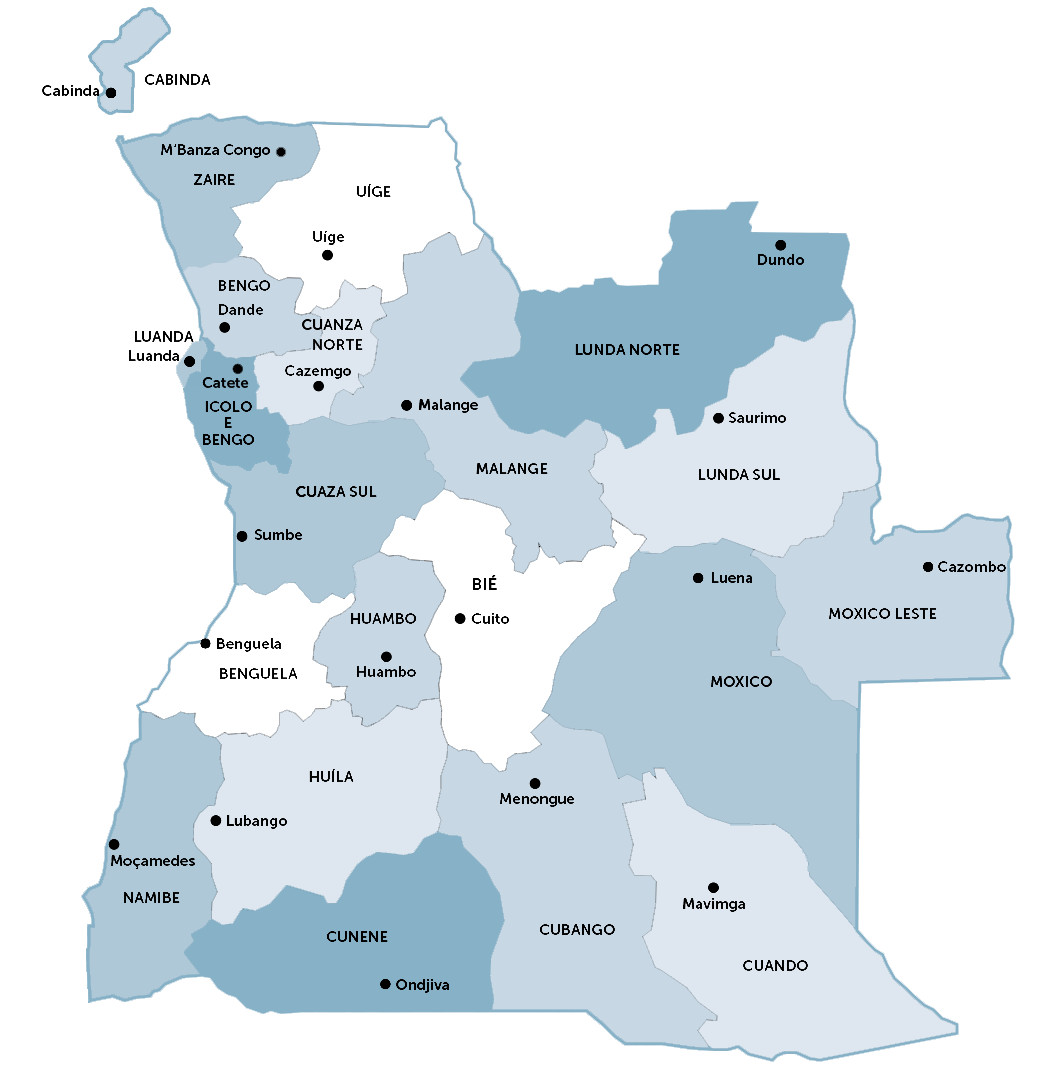
Map of the present provinces of Angola, still very similar to the Portuguese-era districts.

The Angolan War of Independence (Portuguese: Guerra de Independência de Angola; 1961–1974), known as the Armed Struggle of National Liberation (Portuguese: Luta Armada de Libertação Nacional) in Angola, was a war of independence fought by the Angolan nationalist forces of the MPLA, UNITA and FNLA against Portugal. It began as an uprising by Angolans against the Portuguese imposition of forced cultivation of only cotton as a commodity crop. As the resistance spread against colonial authorities, multiple factions developed that struggled for control of Portugal's overseas province of Angola. There were three nationalist movements and also a separatist movement.

When a peaceful coup in Lisbon in April 1974 overthrew Portugal's Estado Novo dictatorship, the new regime immediately stopped all military action in the African colonies, declaring its intention to grant them independence without delay.

The conflict is usually approached as a branch or a theater of the wider Portuguese Colonial War. This included the independence wars of Guinea-Bissau and Mozambique.

The Angolans waged a guerrilla war, to which the Portuguese army and security forces conducted a counter-insurgency campaign against armed groups, who were mostly dispersed across sparsely populated areas of the vast Angolan countryside. Many atrocities were committed by all forces involved in the conflict.

After the Portuguese withdrew, an armed conflict broke out in Angola among the nationalist movements. The war formally came to an end in January 1975 when the Portuguese government, the National Union for the Total Independence of Angola (UNITA), the Popular Movement for the Liberation of Angola (MPLA), and the National Liberation Front of Angola (FNLA) signed the Alvor Agreement. Informally, the civil war resumed by May 1975, including street fighting in Luanda and the surrounding countryside.

== Background of the territory ==
In 1482, the Kingdom of Portugal's caravels, commanded by navigator Diogo Cão, arrived in the Kingdom of Kongo. Other expeditions followed, and close relations were soon established between the two kingdoms. The Portuguese brought many technological advances including firearms, and a new religion, Christianity. In return, the King of Kongo offered slaves, ivory and minerals.

Paulo Dias de Novais founded Luanda in 1575 as São Paulo da Assunção de Loanda. Novais occupied a strip of land with a hundred families of colonists and four hundred soldiers, and established a fortified settlement. The Portuguese crown granted Luanda the status of city in 1605. The Portuguese founded and maintained several other settlements, forts and ports, such as Benguela, a Portuguese fort from 1587, and a town from 1617.

The early period of Portuguese incursion was punctuated by a series of wars, treaties and disputes with local African rulers, particularly Nzinga Mbandi, who resisted Portugal with great determination. The conquest of the territory of present-day Angola started only in the 19th century and was not concluded before the 1920s.

In 1834, Angola and the rest of the Portuguese overseas dominions received the status of overseas provinces of Portugal. From then on, the official position of the Portuguese authorities was always that Angola was an integral part of Portugal in the same way as were the provinces of the Metropole (European Portugal). Angola’s status as a province was briefly interrupted between 1926 and 1951, when it was governed as a "colony" (itself administratively divided into several provinces). The provincial status was restored on 11 June 1951. The Portuguese constitutional revision of 1971 enacted progressive autonomy.

Angola has always had very low population density. Despite having a territory larger than France and Germany combined, Angola's population was only 5 million in 1960, of which around 180,000 were whites, 55,000 were mixed race and the rest were blacks. In the 1970s, the population had increased to 5.65 million, of which 450,000 were whites, 65,000 were mixed race and the rest were blacks. Political scientist Gerald Bender wrote "... by the end of 1974 the white population of Angola would be approximately 335,000, or slightly more than half the number which has commonly been reported."

The provincial government of Angola was headed by the Governor-General, who had both executive and legislative powers, reporting to the Portuguese Government, through the Minister of the Overseas. He was assisted by a cabinet made up of a Secretary-General (who also served as his deputy) and several provincial secretaries, each managing a given portfolio. There was a Legislative Council – including both appointed and elected members – with legislative responsibilities that were gradually increased in the 1960s and the 1970s. In 1972, it was transformed in the Legislative Assembly of Angola. There was also a Council of Government, responsible for advising the Governor-General in his legislative and executive responsibilities, which included the senior public officials of the province.

Despite being responsible for the police and other civil internal security forces, the Governor-General did not have military responsibilities, which were vested in the Commander-in-Chief of the Armed Forces of Angola. The Commander-in-Chief reported directly to the Minister of National Defense and the Chief of the General Staff of the Armed Forces. On some occasions however, the same person was appointed to fulfil both the roles of Governor-General and Commander-in-Chief, thus assuming both civil and military responsibilities.

In 1961, the local administration of Angola included the following districts: Cabinda, Congo, Luanda, Cuanza Norte, Cuanza Sul, Malanje, Lunda, Benguela, Huambo, Bié-Cuando-Cubango, Moxico, Moçâmedes and Huíla. In 1962, the Congo District was divided in the Zaire and Uige districts and that of Bié-Cuando-Cubango in the Bié and Cuando-Cubango districts. In 1970, the Cunene District was also created from the southern part of the Huíla District. Each was headed by a district governor, assisted by a district board. Following the Portuguese model of local government, the districts were made of municipalities (concelhos) and these were subdivided in civil parishes (freguesias), each administered by local council (respectively câmara municipal and junta de freguesia). In the regions where the necessary social and economic development had not yet been achieved the municipalities and civil parishes were transitorily replaced, respectively, by administrative circles (circunscrições) and posts (postos). Each of these governed by an official appointed by the government who had wide administrative powers, performing local government, police, sanitary, economical, tributary and even judicial roles. The circle administrators and the chiefs of administrative posts directed the local native auxiliary police officers known as cipaios. In these regions, the traditional authorities – including native kings, rulers and tribal chiefs – were kept and integrated in the administrative system, serving as intermediaries between the provincial authorities and the local native populations.

== Belligerents ==
=== Portuguese forces ===
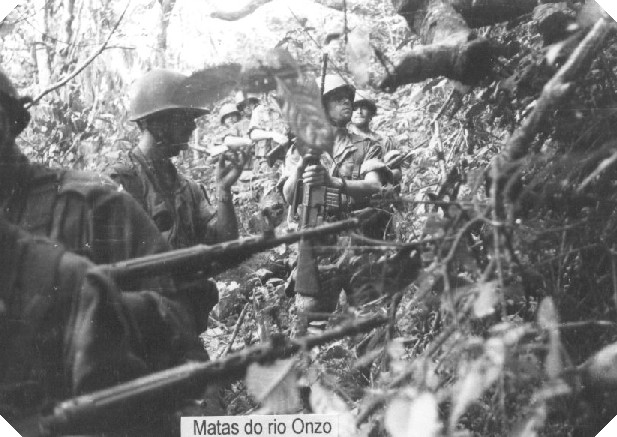
Portuguese paratroopers in the forests of northern Angola

The Portuguese forces engaged in the conflict included mainly the Armed Forces, but also the security and paramilitary forces. Oil deposits found off the coast of Cabinda in 1966 were used to fund the war by the Portuguese, as well as other wars against independence movements in their colonies.

==== Armed forces ====
The Portuguese Armed Forces in Angola included land, naval and air forces, which came under the joint command of the Commander-in-Chief of the Armed Forces of Angola. Until 17 June 1961, there was no appointed Commander-in-Chief, with the joint command in the early stages of the conflict exercised by the commanders of the land forces, generals Monteiro Libório (until June 1961) and Silva Freire (from June to September 1961). From then on, the role of Commander-in-Chief was performed successively by the generals Venâncio Deslandes (1961–1962, also serving as Governor-General), Holbeche Fino (1962–1963), Andrade e Silva (1963–1965), Soares Pereira (1965–1970), Costa Gomes (1970–1972), Luz Cunha (1972–1974) and Franco Pinheiro (1974), all of them from the Army, except Libório from the Air Force. The Commander-in-Chief served as the theatre commander and coordinated the forces of the three branches stationed in the province, with the respective branch commanders serving as assistant commanders-in-chief. During the course of the conflict, the operational role of the Commander-in-Chief and of his staff was increasingly reinforced at the expense of branch commanders. In 1968, the Military Area 1 – responsible for the Dembos rebel area – was established under the direct control of the Commander-in-Chief and, from 1970, the military zones were also put under his direct control, with the Eastern Military Zone becoming a joint command. When the conflict erupted, the Portuguese Armed Forces in Angola only included 6500 men, of whom 1500 were metropolitan Europeans (23% of the total force) and the remainder locals. By the end of the conflict, the number had increased to more than 65,000, of whom 57.6% were metropolitans and the remainder locals.

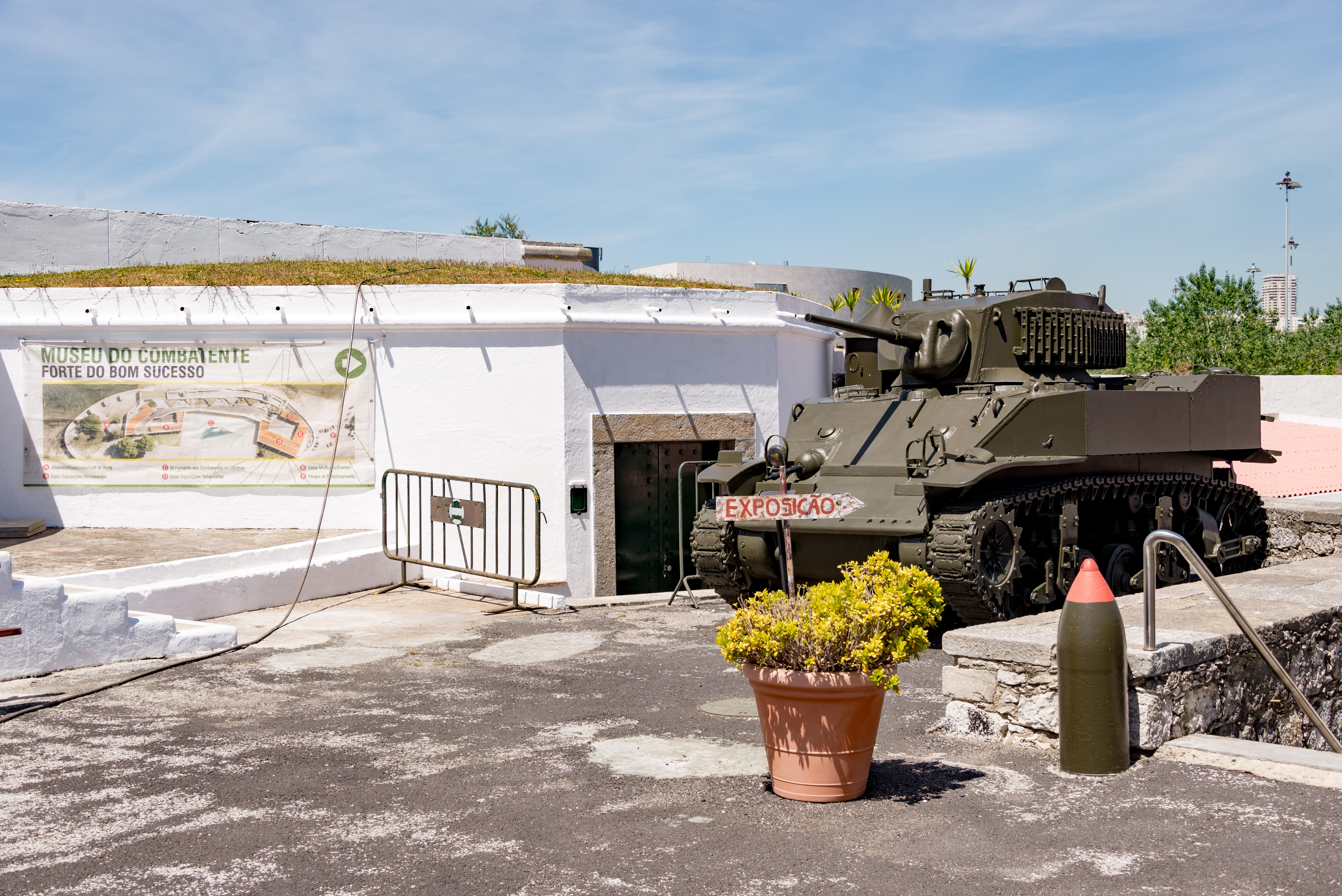
Portuguese M5 Stuart at the Museu do Combatante in Lisbon, saw limited action in Angola.

The land forces in Angola constituted the 3rd Military Region of the Portuguese Army (renamed "Military Region of Angola, RMA" in 1962). The Military Region was foreseen to include five subordinate regional territorial commands, but these had not yet been activated. The disposition of the army units in the province at the beginning of the conflict had been established in 1953, at that a time when no internal conflicts were expected in Angola, and the major Portuguese military concern was the expected conventional war in Europe against the Warsaw Pact.

The previous organization of the former Colonial Military Forces, which had been based on company-sized units scattered across Angola and tasked with internal security duties, was restructured along conventional lines.The new structure consisted of three infantry regiments and several battalion-sized units from various military branches, concentrated in major urban centers.This reorganization aimed to enable the rapid formation of an expeditionary field division that could be deployed from Angola to reinforce the Portuguese Army in Europe in the event of a conventional war.

The regiments and other units were mostly maintained at cadre strength, functioning primarily as training centers for conscripts drafted within the province. During the conflict, these units were responsible for forming locally recruited field forces. In addition to these local units, the Army forces in Angola included reinforcement units raised and deployed from mainland Portugal.

These reinforcement units were temporary formations, composed mainly of conscripts—including most junior officers and non-commissioned officers. They existed only for the standard two-year tour of duty and were disbanded once their members completed service.The majority of these units consisted of light infantry battalions and independent companies known as caçadores. These formations were designed to operate autonomously, with minimal support from higher command levels, and were therefore equipped with robust service support components.

They were deployed in a grid system (quadrícula) along the theatre of operations, with each one responsible for a given area of responsibility. Usually, a regiment-sized agrupamento (battlegroup) commanded a sector, divided into several sub-sectors, each constituting the area of responsibility of a caçadores battalion. Each battalion, in turn, had field companies distributed across the sub-sector, with each company responsible for a specific portion of it.From 1962, four intervention zones (Northern, Central, Southern and Eastern) were established – renamed "military zones" in 1967 – each consisting of several sectors. Due to the low scale guerrilla nature of the conflict, the caçadores company became the main tactical unit, with the standard organization in three rifle and one support platoons, being replaced by one based in four identical sub-units known as "combat groups". The Army also fielded regular units of artillery, armored reconnaissance, engineering, communications, signal intelligence, military police and service support. Army also fielded special forces units. Initially, these consisted of companies of special caçadores, trained in guerrilla and counter-insurgency warfare. The Army tried to extend the training of the special caçadores to all the light infantry units, disbanding those companies in 1962. This proved impracticable and soon other special forces were created in the form of the Commandos. The Commandos and a few specially selected caçadores units were not deployed in a grid, but served instead as mobile intervention units under the direct control of the higher echelons of command.

An unconventional force also fielded by the army was the Dragoons of Angola, a special counterinsurgency horse unit created in the mid-1960s.

The Portuguese Navy forces were under the command of the Naval Command of Angola. These forces included the Zaire Flotilla (operating on the river Zaire), naval assets (including frigates and corvettes deployed to Angola in rotation), Marine companies and Special Marine detachments. While the Marine companies served as regular naval infantry with the role of protecting the Navy's installations and vessels, the Special Marines were special forces, serving as mobile intervention units, specialized in amphibious assaults. The initial focus of the navy was mainly the river Zaire, with the mission of interdicting the infiltration of guerrillas in Northern Angola from the bordering Republic of Zaire. Later, the navy also operated in the rivers of Eastern Angola, despite it being a remote interior region at around 1000 km distance from the Ocean.

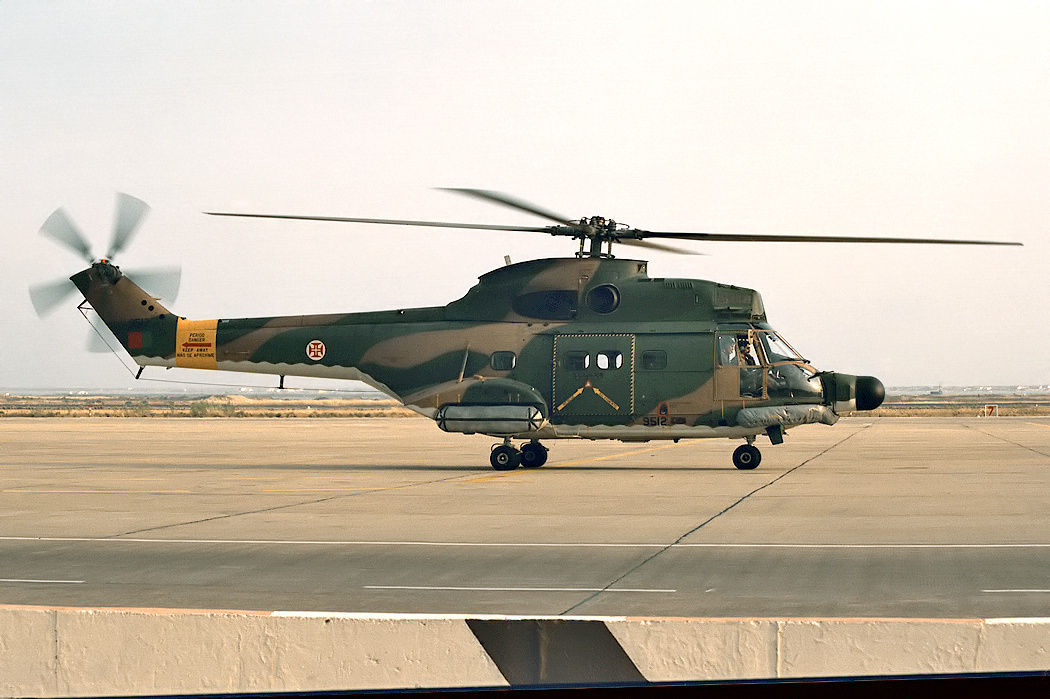
An SA-330 Puma of the Portuguese Air Force.

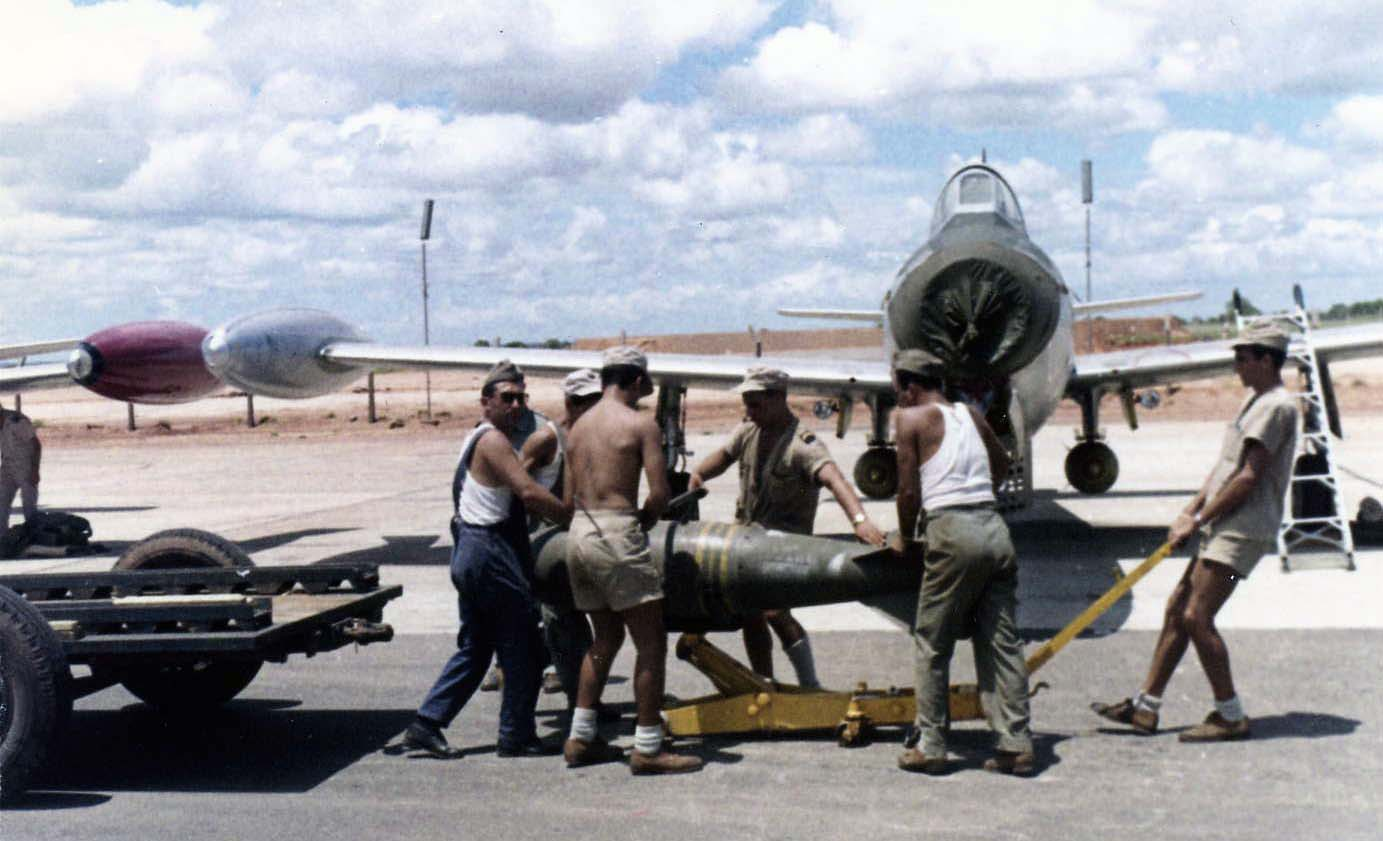
A Portuguese F-84 being loaded with ordnance in the 1960s, at Luanda Air Base, during the Portuguese Colonial War.

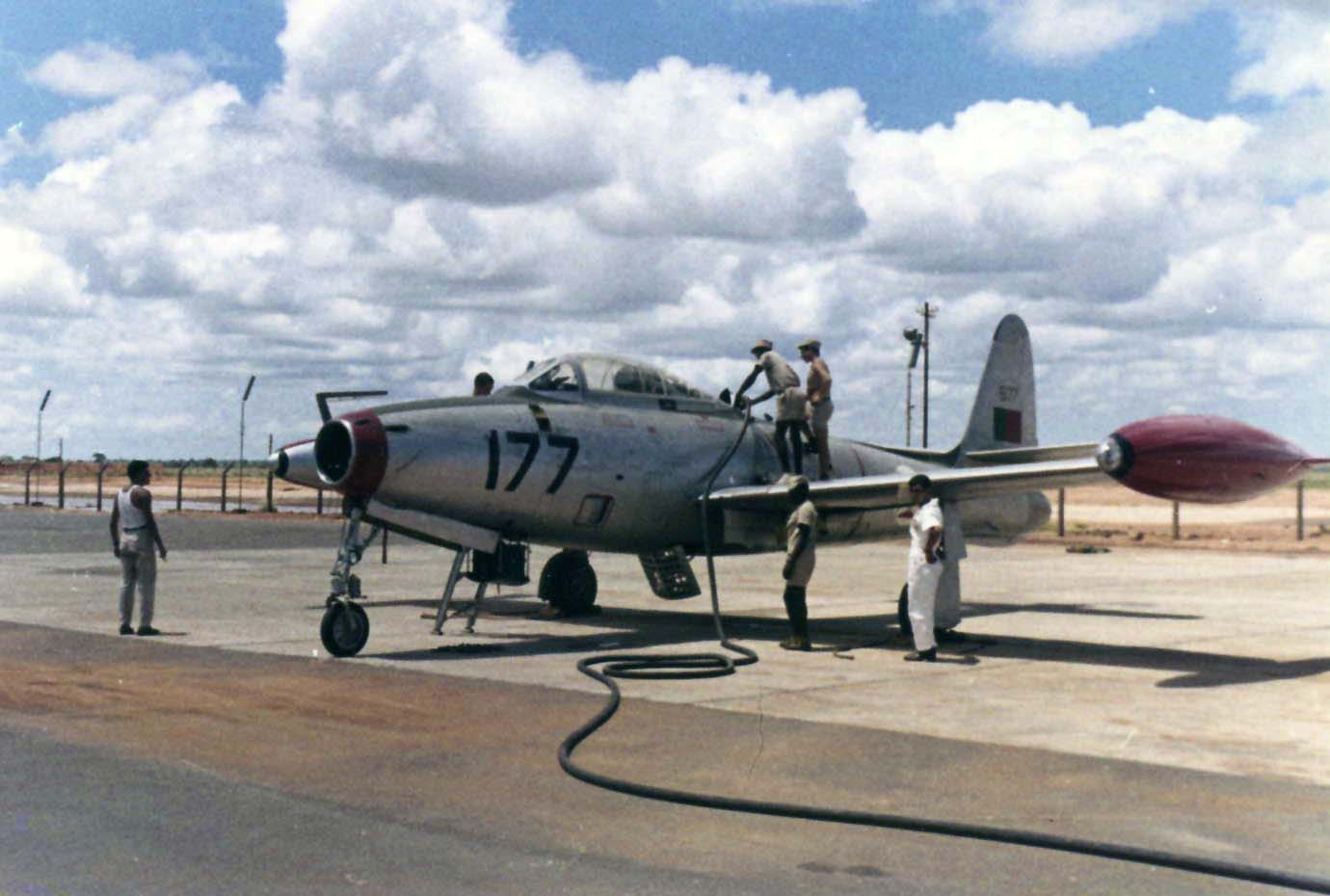
Portuguese Air Force F-84 Thunderjet.

The Portuguese air assets in Angola were under the command of the 2nd Air Region of the Portuguese Air Force, with headquarters in Luanda. They included a central air base (the Air Base 9 at Luanda) and two sector air bases (the Base-Aerodrome 3 at Negage, Uíge and the Base-Aerodrome 4 at Henrique de Carvalho, Lunda). A fourth air base was being built (Base-Aerodrome 10 at Serpa Pinto, Cuando-Cubando), but it was not completed before the end of the conflict. These bases controlled a number of satellite air fields, including maneuver and alternate aerodromes. Besides these, the Air Force also could count with a number of additional airfields, including those of some of the Army garrisons, in some of which air detachments were permanently deployed. The Air Force also maintained in Angola, the Paratrooper Battalion 21, which served as a mobile intervention unit, with its forces initially being deployed by parachute, but later being mainly used in air assaults by helicopter. The Air Force was supported by the voluntary air formations, composed of civil pilots, mainly from local flying clubs, who operated light aircraft mainly in air logistics support missions. In the beginning of the conflict, the Air Force had only a few aircraft stationed in Angola, including 25 F-84G jet fighter-bombers, six PV-2 Harpoon bombers, six Nord Noratlas transport aircraft, six Alouette II helicopters, eight T-6 light attack aircraft and eight Auster light observation aircraft. By the early 1970s, it had available four F-84G, six PV-2 Harpoon, 13 Nord Noratlas, C-47 and C-57 transport aircraft, 30 Alouette III and Puma helicopters, 18 T-6 and 26 Dornier Do 27 observation aircraft. Despite the increase, the number of aircraft was always too few to cover the enormous Angolan territory, besides many being old aircraft difficult to maintain in flying conditions. From the late 1960s, the Portuguese forces in southern Angola were able to count on the support of helicopters and some other air assets of the South African Air Force, with two Portuguese-South African joint air support centers being established.

==== Security forces ====
The security forces in Angola were under the control of the civil authorities, headed by the Governor-General of the province. The forces engaged in the war were the Public Security Police (PSP) and the PIDE (International and State Defense Police which was renamed DGS in 1969). By the middle of the 1960s, these forces included 10,000 PSP constables and 1,100 PIDE agents.

The PSP was the uniformed preventive police of Angola. It was modeled after the European Portuguese PSP. It covered the whole territory of the province, including its rural areas and not only the major urban areas as in European Portugal. The PSP of Angola included a general-command in Luanda and district commands in each of the several district capitals, with a network of police stations and posts scattered along the territory. The Angolan PSP was reinforced with mobile police companies deployed by the European Portuguese PSP. The PSP also included the Rural Guard, which was responsible for the protection of farms and other agricultural companies. In addition, the PSP was responsible for organizing the district militias, which were primarily employed in the self-defense of villages and other settlements.

The PIDE was the Portuguese secret and border police. The PIDE Delegation of Angola included a number of sub-delegations, border posts and surveillance posts. In the war it operated as an intelligence service. The PIDE created and controlled the Flechas, a paramilitary unit of special forces made up of natives. The Flechas were initially intended to serve mostly as trackers, but due to their effectiveness were increasingly employed in more offensive operations, including pseudo-terrorist operations.

==== Para-military and irregular forces ====
Besides the regular armed and security forces, there were a number of para-military and irregular forces, some of them under the control of the military and other controlled by the civil authorities.

The OPVDCA (Provincial Organization of Volunteers and Civil Defense of Angola) was a militia-type corps responsible for internal security and civil defense roles, with similar characteristics to those of the Portuguese Legion of European Portugal. It was under the direct control of the Governor-General of the province. Its origin was the Corps of Volunteers organized in the beginning of the conflict, which became the Provincial Organization of Volunteers in 1962, also assuming the role of civil defense in 1964, when it became the OPVDCA. It was made up of volunteers that served part-time, most of these being initially whites, but latter becoming increasingly multi-racial. In the conflict, the OPVDCA was mainly employed in the defense of people, lines of communications and sensitive installations. It included a central provincial command and a district command in each of the Angolan districts. It is estimated that by the end of the conflict there were 20,000 OPVDCA volunteers.

The irregular paramilitary forces, included a number of different types of units, with different characteristics. Under military control, were the Special Groups (GE) and the Special Troops (TE). The GE were platoon-sized combat groups of special forces made up of native volunteers, which operated in Eastern Angola, usually attached to Army units. The TE had similar characteristics, but were made up of defectors from FNLA, operating in Cabinda and Northern Angola. Under the control of the civil authorities were the Fieis (Faithfuls) and the Leais (Loyals). The Fieis was a force made up mostly of exiled Katangese gendarmes from the Front for Congolese National Liberation, which opposed Mobutu regime, being organized in three battalions. The Leais was a force made up of political exiles from Zambia.

==== Race and ethnicity in the Portuguese Armed Forces ====
Ethnic map of Angola in 1970.

From 1900 to the early 1950s, the Portuguese maintained a separate colonial army in their African possessions, consisting mainly of a limited number of companhias indígenas (native companies). Officers and senior NCOs were seconded from the metropolitan army, while junior NCOs were mainly drawn from Portuguese settlers of the overseas territories. The rank and file were a mixture of black African volunteers and white conscripts from the settler community doing their obligatory military service. Black assimilados were in theory also liable to conscription but in practice only a limited number were called on to serve. With the change in official status of the African territories from colonies to overseas provinces in 1951, the colonial army lost its separate status and was integrated into the regular forces of Portugal itself. The basis of recruitment for the overseas units remained essentially unchanged.

According to the Mozambican historian João Paulo Borges Coelho, the Portuguese colonial army was segregated along lines of race and ethnicity. Until 1960, there were three classes of soldiers: commissioned soldiers (European and African whites), overseas soldiers (black African assimilados or civilizados), and native soldiers (Africans who were part of the indigenato regime). These categories were renamed to 1st, 2nd and 3rd class in 1960—which effectively corresponded to the same classification. Later, although skin colour ceased to be an official discriminator, in practice the system changed little—although from the late 1960s onward, blacks were admitted as ensigns (alferes), the lowest rank in the hierarchy of commissioned officers.

Numerically, black soldiers never amounted to more than 41% of the Colonial army, an increase from just 18% at the outbreak of the war. Coelho noted that perceptions of African soldiers varied a good deal among senior Portuguese commanders during the conflict in Angola, Guinea and Mozambique. General Costa Gomes, perhaps the most successful counterinsurgency commander, sought good relations with local civilians and employed African units within the framework of an organized counter-insurgency plan. General Spínola, by contrast, appealed for a more political and psycho-social use of African soldiers. General Kaúlza, the most conservative of the three, feared African forces outside his strict control and seems not to have progressed beyond his initial racist perception of the Africans as inferior beings.

Native African troops, although widely deployed, were initially employed only in subordinate roles as enlisted troops or noncommissioned officers. As the war went on, an increasing number of native Angolans rose to positions of command, although of junior rank. After 500 years of colonial rule, Portugal had failed to appoint any native black governors, headmasters, police inspectors, or professors, nor a single commander of senior commissioned rank in the overseas Army.

Here Portuguese colonial administrators fell victim to the legacy of their own discriminatory and limited policies in education, which largely barred indigenous Angolans from an equal and adequate education until well after the outbreak off the insurgency. By the early 1970s, the Portuguese authorities had fully perceived these flaws as wrong and contrary to their overseas ambitions in Portuguese Africa, and willingly accepted a true color blindness policy with more spending in education and training opportunities, which started to produce a larger number of black high-ranked professionals, including military personnel.

=== Nationalist and separatist forces ===
==== UPA/FNLA ====
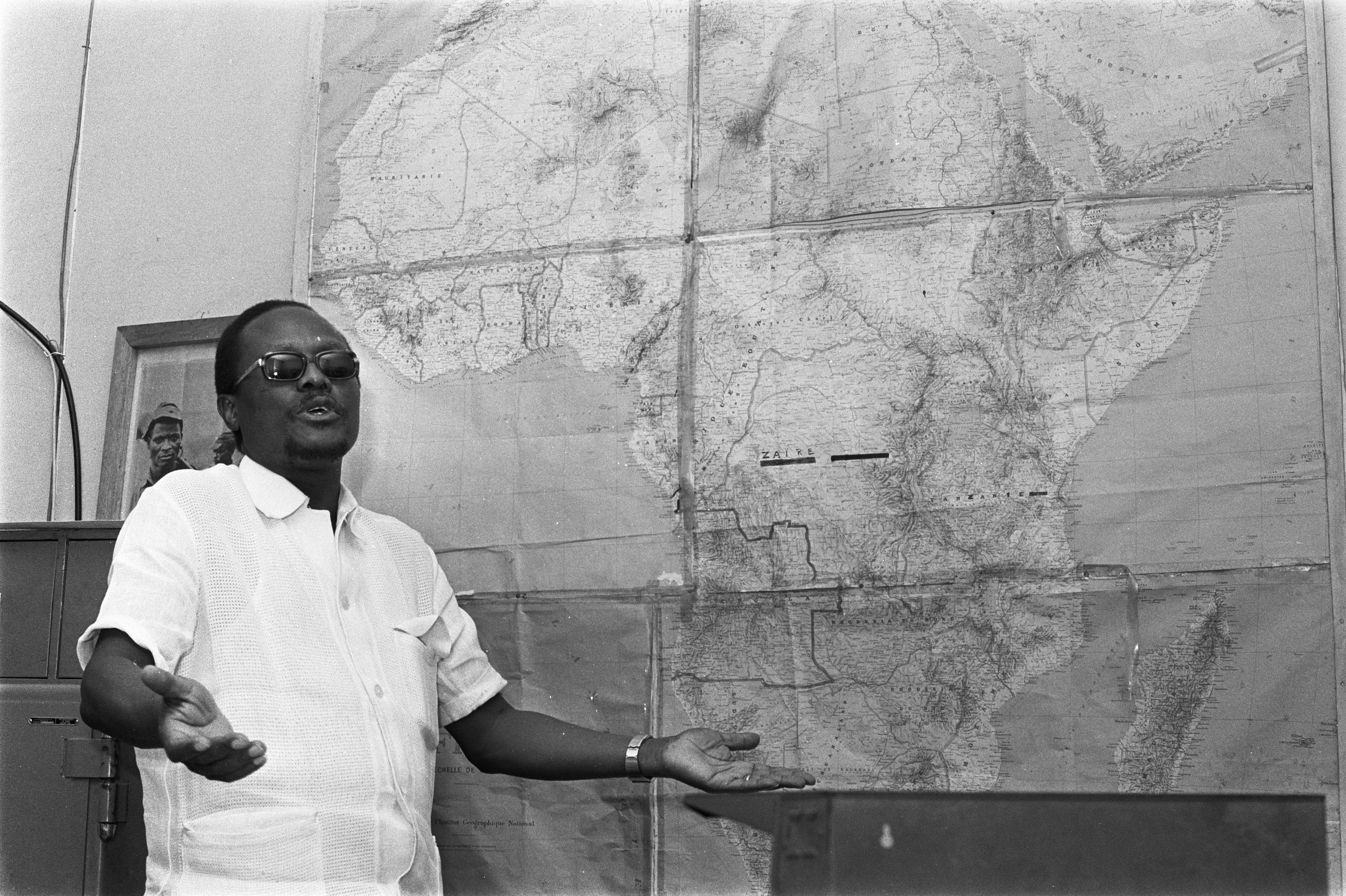
Holden Roberto in 1973.

UPA was created on 7 July 1954, as the Union of the Peoples of Northern Angola, by Holden Roberto, a descendant of the old Kongo Royal House, who was born in northern Angola but had lived since his early childhood in the Belgian Congo, where he came to work for the local colonial authorities. In 1958, the movement adopted a more embracing designation, becoming the Union of the Peoples of Angola (UPA). In 1960, Holden Roberto signed an agreement with the MPLA for the two movements to fight together against the Portuguese forces, but he ended up fighting alone. In 1962, UPA merged with the Democratic Party of Angola, becoming the National Liberation Front of Angola (FNLA), positioning itself as a pro-American and anti-Soviet organization. In the same year, it created the Revolutionary Government of Angola in Exile (GRAE). UPA and later the FNLA were mainly supported by the Bakongo ethnic group of the old Kingdom of Kongo, including the Northwestern and Northern Angola, as well as parts of the French and Belgian Congos. It had always had strong connections with the former Belgian Congo (named Zaire since 1971), because Holden Roberto was the friend and brother-in-law of Mobutu Sese Seko among other reasons.

The armed branch of the FNLA was the National Liberation Army of Angola (ELNA). It was mainly supported by Congo/Zaire—where its troops were based and trained—and by Algeria. They were financed by the US and—despite considering themselves anti-communists—received weapons from Eastern European countries.

==== MPLA ====
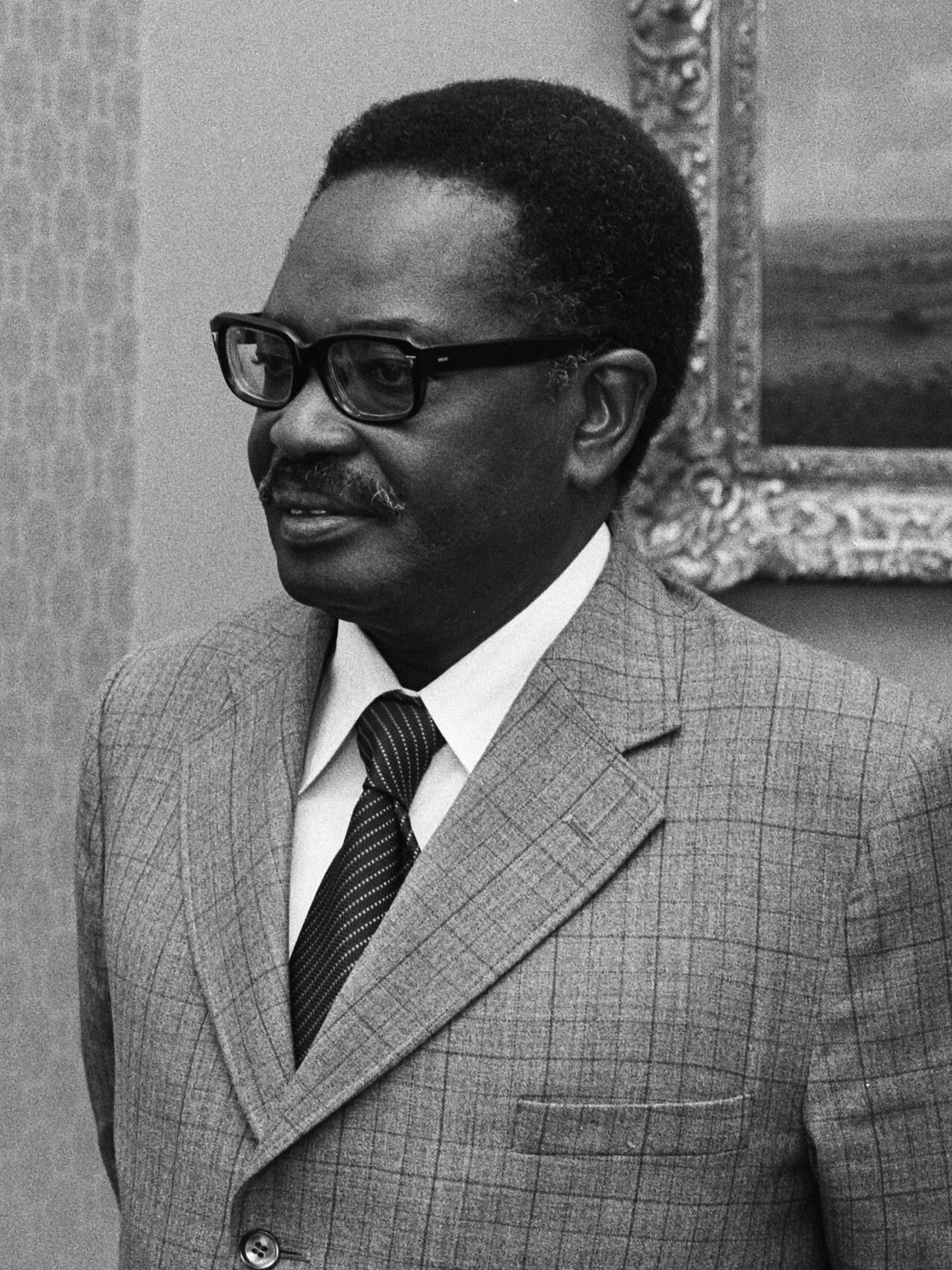
Agostinho Neto (in 1975).

The People's Movement of Liberation of Angola (MPLA) was founded in 1956, by the merging of the Party of the United Struggle for Africans in Angola (PLUAA) and the Angolan Communist Party (PCA). The MPLA was an organization of the left-wing politics, which included mixed race and white members of the Angolan intelligentsia and urban elites, supported by the Ambundu and other ethnic groups of the Luanda, Bengo, Cuanza Norte, Cuanza Sul and Mallange districts. It was headed by Agostinho Neto (president) and Viriato da Cruz (secretary-general), both Portuguese-educated urban intellectuals. It was mainly externally supported by the Soviet Union and Cuba, with its tentative to receive support from the United States failing, as these were already supporting UPA/FNLA.

The armed wing of the MPLA was the People's Army of Liberation of Angola (EPLA). In its peak, the EPLA included around 4500 fighters, being organized in military regions. It was mainly equipped with Soviet weapons, mostly received through Zambia, which included Tokarev pistol, PPS submachine guns, Simonov automatic rifles, Kalashnikov assault rifles, machine-guns, mortars, rocket-propelled grenades, anti-tank mines and anti-personnel mines.

==== UNITA ====
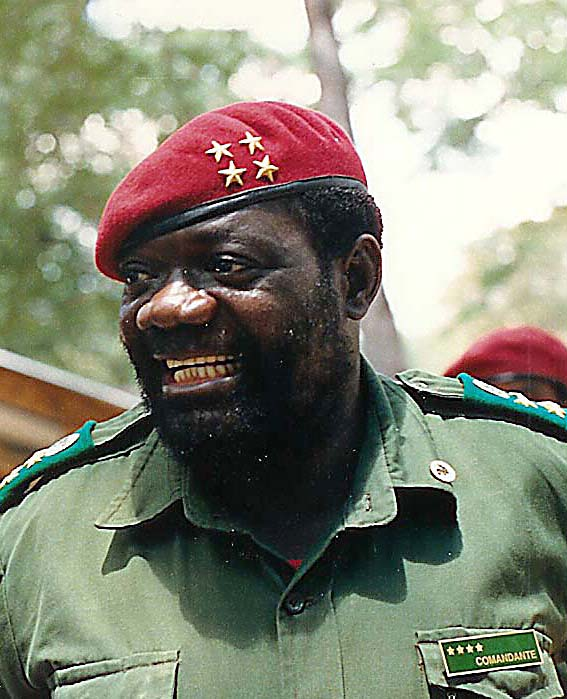
Jonas Savimbi.

The Union for the Total Independence of Angola (UNITA) was created in 1966 by Jonas Savimbi, a dissident of FNLA. Jonas Savimbi was the Foreign Minister of the GRAE but in the course of time clashed with Holden Roberto, accusing him of having complicity with the US and of following an imperialist policy. Savimbi was a member of the Ovimbundu tribe of Central and Southern Angola, son of an Evangelic pastor, who went to study medicine in European Portugal, although he never graduated. The group followed a Maoist ideology initially and received support from the People's Republic of China, although they switched to a more broad anti-communist platform after 1975.

The Armed Forces of Liberation of Angola (FALA) constituted the armed branch of UNITA. They had few fighters and were not well equipped. Its difficulties led Savimbi to make agreements with the Portuguese authorities, focusing more on fighting MPLA.

When the war ended, UNITA was the only one of the nationalist movements that was able to maintain forces operating inside the Angolan territory, while the forces of the remaining movements were eliminated or expelled by Portuguese forces.

==== FLEC ====
The Front for the Liberation of the Enclave of Cabinda (FLEC) was founded in 1963, by the merging of the Movement for the Liberation of the Enclave of Cabinda (MLEC), the Action Committee of the Cabinda National Union (CAUNC) and the Mayombe National Alliance (ALLIAMA). On the contrary of the remaining three movements, FLEC did not fight for the independence of the whole Angola, but only for the independence of Cabinda, which it considered a separate country. Although its activities started still before the withdrawal of Portugal from Angola, the military actions of FLEC occurred mainly after, being aimed against the Angolan armed and security forces. FLEC is the only of the nationalist and separatist movements that still maintains a guerrilla warfare until today.

==== RDL ====
The Eastern Revolt (RDL) was a dissident wing of the MPLA, created in 1973, under the leadership of Daniel Chipenda, in opposition to the line of Agostinho Neto. A second dissident wing was the Active Revolt, created at the same time.

== Pre-war events ==
=== International politics ===
The international politics of the late 1940s and 1950s was marked by the Cold War and the wind of change in the European colonies in Asia and Africa.

In October 1954, the Algerian War was initiated by a series of explosions in Algiers. This conflict would lead to the presence of more than 400,000 French military in Algeria until its end in 1962. Foreseeing a similar conflict in its African territories, the Portuguese military paid acute attention to this war, sending observers and personnel to be trained in the counter-insurgence warfare tactics employed by the French.

In 1955, the Bandung Conference was held in Indonesia, with the participation of 29 Asian and African countries, most of which were newly independent. The conference promoted the Afro-Asian economic and cultural cooperation and opposed colonialism or neocolonialism. It was an important step towards the Non-Aligned Movement.

Following the admission of Portugal to the United Nations in December 1955, the Secretary-General officially asked the Portuguese Government if the country had non-self-governing territories under its administration. Maintaining consistency with its official doctrine that all Portuguese overseas provinces were an integral part of Portugal as was the Portuguese European territory, the Portuguese Government responded that Portugal did not have any territories that could be qualified as non-self-governing and so it did not have any obligation of providing any information requested under the Article 73 of the United Nations Charter.

In 1957, Ghana (former British Gold Coast) becomes the first European colony in Africa to achieve independence, under the leadership of Kwame Nkrumah. In 1958, he organized the Conference of African Independent States, which aimed to be the African Bandung.

The former Belgian Congo and northern neighbor of Angola became independent in 1960, as the Republic of the Congo (known as "Congo-Léopoldville" and later "Congo-Kinshasa", being renamed "Republic of Zaire" in 1971), with Joseph Kasa-Vubu as president and Patrice Lumumba as prime-minister. Immediately after independence, a number of violent disturbances occurred leading to the Congo Crisis. The white population became a target, with more than 80,000 Belgian residents being forced to flee from the country. The Katanga seceded under the leadership of Moïse Tshombe. The crisis led to the intervention of United Nations and Belgian military forces. The Congolese internal conflicts would culminate with the ascension to power of Mobutu Sese Seko in 1965.

John F. Kennedy was inaugurated as President of the United States on 20 January 1961. His Administration started to support the African nationalist movements, with the objective of neutralizing the increasing Soviet influence in Africa. Regarding Angola, the United States started to give direct support to the UPA and assumed a hostile attitude against Portugal, forbidding it to use American weapons in Africa.

In 1964, Northern Rhodesia became independent as Zambia, under the leadership of Kenneth Kaunda. From then on, Angola was almost entirely surrounded by countries with regimes hostile to Portugal, the exception being South West Africa.

=== Internal politics and rise of Angolan nationalism ===
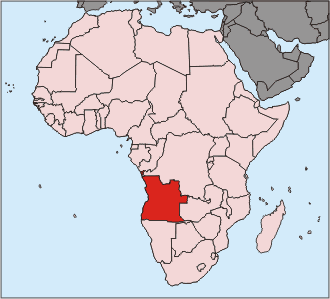
Angola highlighted on a map of modern-day Africa

The Portuguese Colonial Act – passed on 13 June 1933 – defined the relationship between the Portuguese overseas territories and the metropole, until being revised in 1951. The Colonial Act reflected an imperialistic view of the overseas territories typical among the European colonial powers of the late 1920s and 1930s. During the period in which it was in force, the Portuguese overseas territories lost the status of "provinces" that they had had since 1834, becoming designated "colonies", with the whole Portuguese overseas territories becoming officially designated "Portuguese Colonial Empire." The Colonial Act subtly recognized the supremacy of the Portuguese over native people, and even if the natives could pursue all studies including university, the de facto situation was of clear disadvantage due to deep cultural and social differences between most of the traditional indigenous communities and the ethnic Portuguese living in Angola.

Due to its imperialist orientation, the Colonial Act started to be called into question. In 1944, José Ferreira Bossa, former Minister of the Colonies, proposed the revision of the Act, including the end up of the designation "colonies" and the resume of the traditional designation "overseas provinces." On 11 June 1951, a new law passed in the Portuguese National Assembly reviewed the Constitution, finally repulsing the Colonial Act. As part of these, the provincial status was returned to all Portuguese overseas territories. By this law, the Portuguese territory of Angola ceased to be called Colónia de Angola (Colony of Angola) and started again to be officially called Província de Angola (Province of Angola).

In 1948, Viriato da Cruz and others formed the Movement of Young Intellectuals, an organization that promoted Angolan culture. Nationalists sent a letter to the United Nations calling for Angola to be given protectorate status under UN supervision.

In the 1950s, a new wave of Portuguese settlement in all of Portuguese Africa, including the overseas province of Angola, was encouraged by the ruling government of António de Oliveira Salazar.

In 1953, Angolan separatists founded the Party of the United Struggle for Africans in Angola (PLUAA), the first political party to advocate Angolan independence from Portugal. In 1954, ethnic Bakongo nationalists in the Belgian Congo and Angola formed the Union of Peoples of Northern Angola (UPA), which advocated the independence of the historical Kingdom of Kongo, which included other territories outside the Portuguese overseas province of Angola.

During 1955, Mário Pinto de Andrade and his brother Joaquim formed the Angolan Communist Party (PCA). In December 1956 PLUAA merged with the PCA to form the Popular Movement for the Liberation of Angola (MPLA). The MPLA, led by da Cruz, Mário Andrade, Ilidio Machado, and Lúcio Lara, derived support from the Ambundu and in Luanda.

In March 1959, when inaugurating the new military shooting range of Luanda, the Governor-General of Angola, Sá Viana Rebelo, made the famous Shooting Range Speech, where he predicted a possible conflict in Angola.

General Monteiro Libório assumed the command of the land forces of Angola, with prerogatives of commander-in-chief, in September 1959. He would be the Portuguese military commander in office when the conflict erupts.

Álvaro Silva Tavares assumed the office of Governor-General of Angola in January 1960, being the holder of the office when the conflict erupted.

During January 1961, Henrique Galvão, heading a group of operatives of the DRIL oppositionist movement, hijacked the Portuguese liner Santa Maria. The intention of Galvão was to set sail to Angola, where he would disembark and establish a rebel Portuguese government in opposition to Salazar, but he was forced to head to Brazil, where he liberated the crew and passengers in exchange for political asylum.

Feeling the need of having forces trained in counter-insurgency operations, the Portuguese Army created the Special Operations Troops Centre in April 1960, where companies of special forces (baptized special caçadores) started preparations. The first three companies of special caçadores (CCE) were dispatched to Angola in June 1960, mainly due to the Congo Crisis. Their main mission was to protect the Angolan regions bordering the ex-Belgian Congo, each being stationed in Cabinda (1st CCE), in Toto, Uíge (2nd CCE) and Malanje (3rd CCE).

=== The Baixa de Cassanje revolt ===
Although usually considered as an event that predates the Angolan War of Independence, some authors consider the Baixa de Cassanje revolt, also known as "Maria's War", as the initial event of the conflict. It was a labour conflict, not related directly with the calls for independence. The Baixa do Cassanje was a rich agricultural region of the Malanje District, bordering the ex-Belgian Congo, with approximately the size of Mainland Portugal, which was the origin of most of the cotton production of Angola. The region's cotton fields were in the hands of the Cotonang – General Company of the Cottons of Angola, a company mostly held by Belgian capital and which employed many natives. Despite its contribution for the development of the region, Cotonang had been accused several times of disrespecting the labour legislation regarding working conditions of its employees, causing it to become under the investigation of the Portuguese authorities, but with no relevant actions against it being yet taken.

Feeling discontent with Cotonang, in December 1960, many of its workers started to strike, demanding better working conditions and higher wages. The discontent was seized by infiltrated indoctrinators of the Congolese PSA (African Solidarity Party) to foment an uprising of the local peoples. At that time, the only Portuguese Army unit stationed in the region was the 3rd Special Caçadores Company (3rd CCE), tasked with the patrolling and protection of the border with the ex-Belgian Congo. Despite receiving complains from local whites who felt their security threatened, the Governor of the Malanje District, Júlio Monteiro – a mixed race Cape Verdean – did not authorize the 3rd CCE to act against the rebels and also forbade the acquisition of self-defense weapons by the white population. From 9 to 11 January 1961, the situation worsened, with the murder of a mixed race Cotonang foreman and with the surrounding of a 3rd CCE patrol by hundreds of rebels. Finally, on 2 February, the clashes between the rebels and the security forces erupted, with the first shots being fired, causing 11 deaths. By that time, the uprising had spread to the whole Malanje District and threatened to spread to the neighboring districts. The rebel leaders took advantage of the superstitious beliefs of most of their followers to convince them that the bullets of the Portuguese military forces were made of water and so could do no harm. Presumably due to this belief, the rebels, armed with machetes and canhangulos (home-made shotguns), attacked the military en masse, in the open field, without concern for their own protection, falling under the fire of the troops.

Given the limitations of the 3rd CCE to deal with the uprising in such a large region, the Command of the 3rd Military Region in Luanda decided to organize an operation with a stronger military force to subjugate it. A provisional battalion under the command of Major Rebocho Vaz was organized by the Luanda Infantry Regiment, integrating the 3rd CCE, the 4th CCE (stationed in Luanda) and the 5th CCE (that was still en route from the Metropole to Angola). On 4 February, the 4th CCE was already embarked in the train ready to be dispatched to Malanje, when an uprising at Luanda erupted, with several prisons and Police facilities being stormed. Despite the indefinite situation at Luanda and despite having few combat units available there, General Libório, commander of the 3rd Military Region decided to go forward with the sending of the 4th CCE to Malanje, which arrived there on 5 February. The provisional battalion started gradually to subdue the uprising.

The land forces were supported by the Portuguese Air Force, which employed Auster light observation and PV-2 ground attack aircraft. The military forces were able to assume the control of the region by 11 February. By the 16th, the provisional battalion was finally reinforced with the 5th CCE which had been held in Luanda as a reserve force after disembarking in Angola. Baixa do Cassanje was officially considered pacified on 27 February. The anti-Portuguese forces claimed that, during the subduing of the uprising, the Portuguese military bombed villages in the area, using napalm and killing between 400 and 7000 natives. However, the Portuguese military reported that no napalm was ever used in the operations and that the number of rebels dead was less than 300, plus 100 registered injured treated at the Malanje Hospital. The military forces suffered two dead and four injured.

After the subdue of the uprising, the Portuguese military pressed the Government-General of Angola to take actions to improve the working conditions of the Cotonang employees in order to defuse the situation. The Governor-General Silva Tavares took measures to calm down the situation and on 2 May 1961, the Government decreed the change of the labor legislation related with cotton culture. Apparently, these measures were successful in greatly reducing the discontent among the laborers of the Baixa de Cassanje, with the region remaining peaceful even after the UPA attacks of 15 March 1961.

=== The 4 and 10 February events at Luanda ===
The facts about the events of 4 and 10 February 1961 are still very much clouded by the propaganda and contradictory information issued by the various parties about what really happened.

At a time when Luanda was full of foreign journalists that were covering the possible arriving at Angola of the hijacked liner Santa Maria and with the Baixa de Casanje revolt on its peak, on the early morning of 4 February 1961, a number of black militants, mostly armed with machetes, ambushed a Public Security Police (PSP) patrol-car and stormed the Civil Jail of São Paulo, the Military Detection House and the PSP Mobile Company Barracks, with the apparent objective of freeing political prisoners that were being held in those facilities. They were not able to storm other planned targets like the Airport, the National Broadcast Station, post office and military barracks. Different sources indicate the number of militants involved in the attacks as being between 50 and several hundred. The militants were able to kill the crew of the patrol-car, taking their weapons, but their assaults against the several facilities was repulsed, and they did not succeed in releasing any prisoners. In the assaults, the security forces suffered seven dead, including five white and one black police constables and a white Army corporal, in addition to seriously injuring several people. Different sources indicate between 25 and 40 attackers were killed.

The MPLA always officially claimed to be the originator of the attacks. However, this is contested. Several sources indicate the Angolan nationalist mixed race priest Manuel das Neves as the perpetrator of the attacks. Apparently this was also the PIDE theory, which arrested and sent him to the Metropole, where he was interned in religious houses.

An emotional funeral for the deceased police constables was held on 5 February, which was attended by thousands of persons, the majority being white inhabitants of Luanda. During the funeral, riots broke out, which would cause additional dead. There are several contradictory versions of what happened. The anti-Portuguese line states that the riots were originated by the whites, who desired to revenge the dead police constables, committing random acts of violence against the ethnic black majority living in Luanda's slums (musseques). Contrary versions state that the riots were caused when provocative shots were fired near the cemetery where the funeral was being held, causing panic among the attendants. The riots resulted in numerous deaths, though the exact number varies depending on the source. Accounts critical of Portuguese rule describe the events as a massacre carried out by white residents and security forces, with hundreds of Black Angolans killed. According to this perspective:

The Portuguese vengeance was awesome. The police helped civilian vigilantes organise nightly slaughters in the Luanda slums. The whites hauled Africans from their flimsy one-room huts, shot them and left their bodies in the streets. A Methodist missionary... testified that he personally knew of the deaths of almost three hundred.

— John Marcum

However, other sources claim that the massacre narrative is simply anti‑Portuguese propaganda, asserting instead that only 19 people died in the riots. According to this account:

During the funeral of the PSP constables, which reached a gigantic manifestation of grief, with the cemetery full of people, shots were heard outside that caused the widespread panic, especially in the interior, where people practically did not fit. In the ensuing confusion, and of the firing fired, resulted nineteen dead and numerous wounded, incident that gave rise to another myth of massacre, that would have reached hundreds of dead, wounded and imprisoned, completely false numbers. It must be said that many of these people were probably disarmed, even the force that was going to make the salvos of the order, to accompany the highest individualities of Luanda and that it was a military vehicle called on the occasion, that came to the place, and ended the generalized disorder. Also nobody explained, until today, who initiated these disturbances and fired the first shots.

— A.L. Pires Nunes

On 10 February, a similar attack was carried out against the Jail of São Paulo. The security forces were better prepared this time and were able to repulse the attacks without any of their men being killed, although, 22 of the attackers were killed. Apparently, other attacks were being planned, but were discovered and averted by the security forces.

== Course of the conflict ==
=== Beginning of the conflict ===
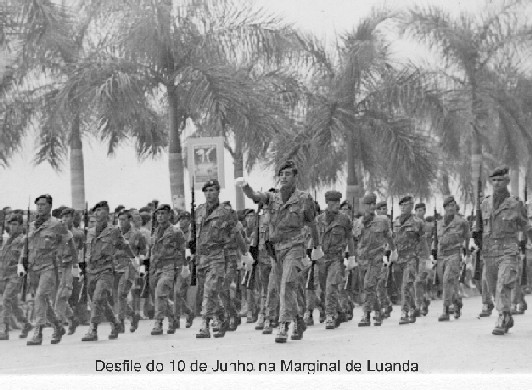
Portuguese colonial troops on parade in Luanda

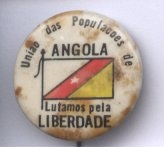
UPA badge

On 15 March 1961, the Union of Peoples of Angola (UPA), under the leadership of Holden Roberto, launched an incursion into northern Angola from its base in the Congo-Léopoldville (the former Belgian Congo), leading 4,000 to 5,000 militants. His forces took farms, government outposts, and trading centers, killing and mutilating officials and civilians, most of them ovimbundu, "contract workers" from the Central Highlands. This began the Angolan War of Independence and of the wider Portuguese Overseas War. UPA militants stormed the Angolan districts of Zaire Province, Uíge, Cuanza Norte and Luanda, massacring the civilian population during their advance, killing 1,000 whites and 6,000 blacks (women and children included in both numbers). Besides the killings, the UPA militants destroyed the infrastructure along their way, including houses, farms, roads and bridges, and created general chaos and panic. The terrified population took refuge in the forests or fled to nearby regions and to Congo-Léopoldville. (Note: For a critical and well-sourced account of the 1961 events see Dalila Cabrita Mateus & Álvaro Mateus, Angola 61: Guerra Colonial, Causas e Consequências. O 4 de Fevereiro e o 15 de Março, Alfragide: Texto Editores, 2011.)

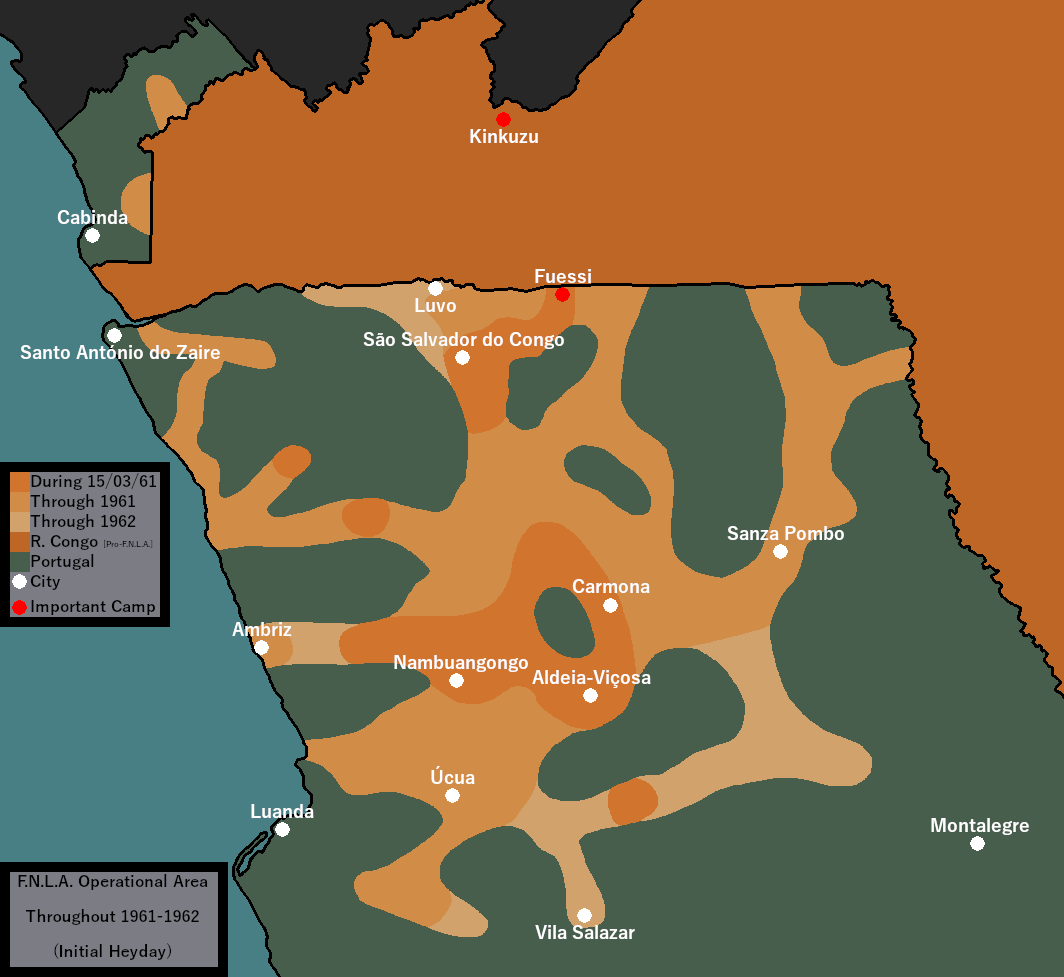
A map of the FNLA operational area in Angola throughout 1961–1962.

However, contrary to the expectations of the UPA, the majority of the white inhabitants who survived the initial attacks did not flee, except some women and children who were evacuated to Luanda. Instead, they entrenched themselves in several towns and villages of the region – including Carmona, Negage, Sanza Pombo, Santa Cruz, Quimbele and Mucaba – resisting the assaults almost with little support from the small military forces.

On the same day and on 16 March – the 7th and the 9th Special Caçadores companies and the 1st Paratrooper Company were dispatched from the metropole to Angola by air. Other similar small units arrived in the following days. Small military columns left Luanda and Carmona to rescue some of the isolated populations of the areas under UPA attack. On 21 March, the Provisional Battalion of Major Rebocho Vaz – which acted in the Baixa de Cassanje revolt – moved to Cuanza Norte to face the UPA advance.

Without reinforcements arriving from the metropole, the Corps of Volunteers of Angola was established on 28 March to formally organize the civilian volunteers who were already engaged in fighting the UPA.

In early April, the village of Cólua, near Aldeia Viçosa, Uíge was attacked and its inhabitants massacred by the UPA. A military column from the Provisional Battalion was sent to the village to try to collect the dead bodies. However, an isolated group of soldiers (including two officers) remained behind and was ambushed, their bodies later found horribly mutilated. Another military patrol sent to the area was also ambushed, and some of their members fell into UPA hands and were tortured, mutilated and killed. 30 civilians and 11 military personnel were eventually killed at Cólua. Later testimony reported that UPA militants practiced cannibalism, eating parts of the dead bodies of soldiers. The Cólua events had an important psychological effect on the Portuguese forces, not only due to the horrifying acts practiced against its soldiers, but also because they realized that the insurgents now dared to attack military forces and not just defenseless civilians.

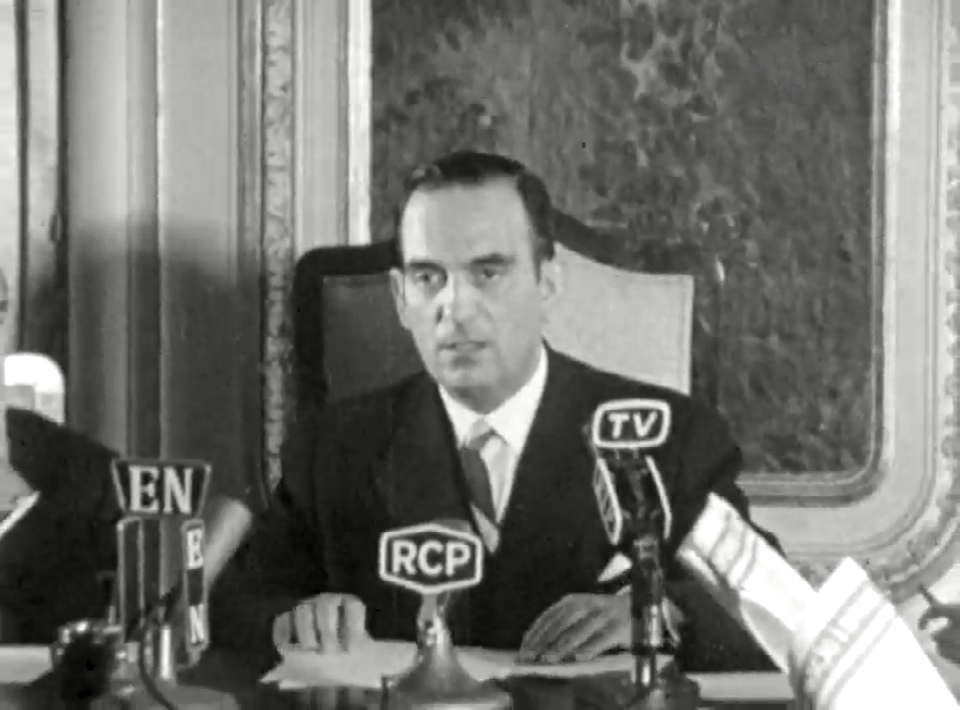
Minister of the Overseas Adriano Moreira.

On 11 April, the Minister of National Defense Júlio Botelho Moniz – discontent with the attitude of Prime Minister Salazar regarding the Overseas policy and the conflict in Angola – lead a coup d'état attempt, which failed. Following the aborted coup and now realizing that the conflict in Angola was more serious than what was initially thought, Prime Minister Salazar dismissed Botelho Moniz and took over the Defense portfolio. On 13 April, Salazar spoke on television about the situation in Angola, using the famous phrase Para Angola, rapidamente e em força (To Angola, rapidly and in force). As part of the government restructuring, Adriano Moreira was appointed Overseas Minister, initiating a series of liberal reforms in the Portuguese Overseas territories.

A strong military mobilization was then initiated by the Portuguese Armed Forces. Finally, on 21 March, the first important military contingent from the Metropole (including the Caçadores battalions 88 and 92) embarked in the ocean liner Niassa, arriving at Luanda on 2 May. The cargo ship Benguela also departed to Angola, carrying war material. In a demonstration of force, the military units at Luanda paraded along the main avenue of the city.

On 13 May, the units from the Metropole start to move to Northern Angola, to occupy strategic positions. Until June, Army units were positioned in Damba, Sanza Pombo, São Salvador do Congo and Cuimba, while Fuzileiros (Marines) occupied Tomboco. Due to the blocked roads, destroyed bridges and ambushes, the movement of the units was slow, with the Portuguese forces suffering numerous casualties. After occupying these positions, the Portuguese units initiated the gradual re-occupation of the areas controlled by the UPA.

In June, Air Force General Augusto Venâncio Deslandes was appointed Governor-General of Angola, replacing Silva Tavares. General António Libório was replaced by General Carlos Silva Freire in the role of commander of the 3rd Military Region (commander of land forces of Angola). General Silva Freire would maintain prerogatives of joint Commander-in-Chief until September, when Venâncio Deslandes was also appointed Commander-in-Chief of the Armed Forces of Angola, in addition to his position of Governor-General.

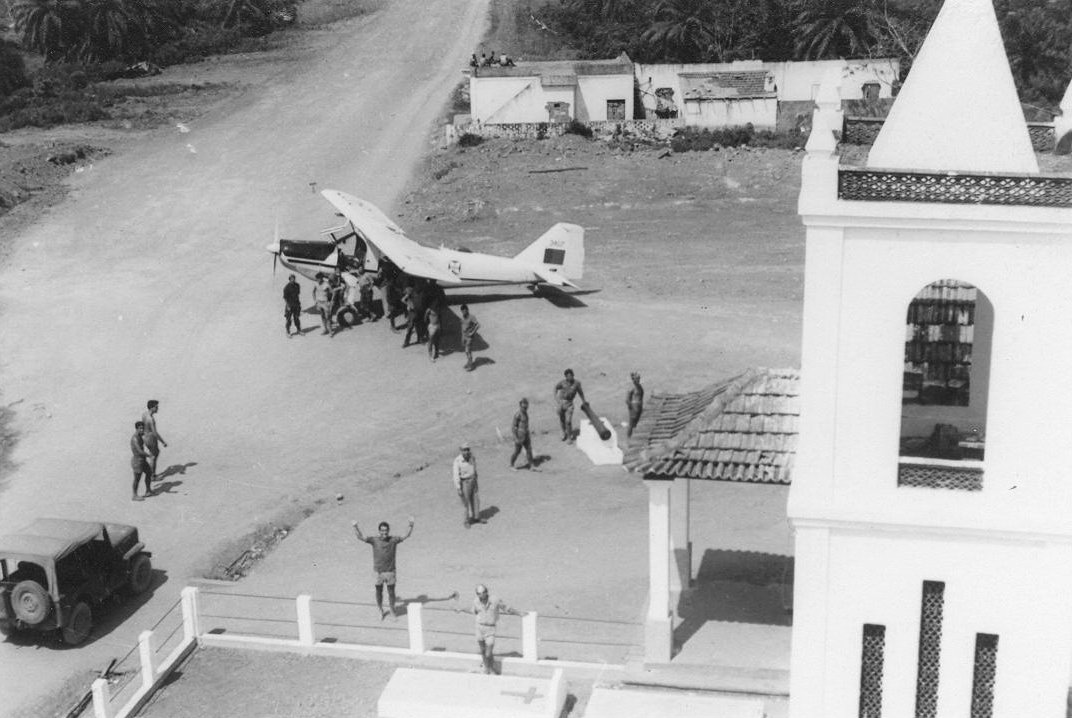
Portuguese Air Force Dornier DO-27 in Nambuangongo in 1962.

On 10 July, the Portuguese forces initiate its first major operation of the conflict – Operation Viriato (Viriathus). Its goal was to reconquor Nambuangongo, in the Dembos forest, which had been proclaimed by UPA as its capital. The operation was still planned as a conventional-type maneuver, with Caçadores battalions 96 and 114 and Cavalry Squadron 149 converging in Nambuangongo through three axes of attack, with the support of artillery, engineering and air forces. On 9 August, the vanguard of the Battalion 96 of Lieutenant-Colonel Armando Maçanita finally arrived and re-occupied Nambuagongo. In their advance, the three military units suffered 75 casualties, including 21 dead.

The Portuguese forces concentrated on re‑occupying the village of Quipedro, aiming to eliminate rebel units in the area and block their retreat northward from Nambuangongo, as a continuation of Operation Viriato. To achieve this, they launched Operation Nema, which marked the Portuguese military’s first airborne combat assault. Conducted between 11 and 21 August, the operation involved the 1st Company of the newly formed Paratroopers Battalion 21 of Angola, who parachuted onto the target following preparatory air strikes. The rebels were taken by surprise, allowing the paratroopers to secure Quipedro with minimal resistance. Afterward, they constructed an improvised runway and awaited the arrival of Cavalry Squadron 149, advancing overland from Nambuangongo.

In August, under the orders of General Silva Freire, the Northern Intervention Zone (ZIN) was established, encompassing the districts of Luanda, Cabinda, Uíge, Zaire, Malanje, and Cuanza Norte. It replaced what had previously been called the "Northern Uprising Zone." Although no conflict had yet broken out in this region, an Eastern Intervention Zone (ZIL) was also created the following month, covering the districts of Lunda and Moxico.

As part of his reforms, Minister Adriano Moreira decreed the repeal of the Statute of the Portuguese Indigenous for the provinces of Guinea, Angola, and Mozambique on 6 August. With its abolition, all Angolans—regardless of race, education, religion, or customs—were granted equal Portuguese citizenship rights and obligations.

On 10 April, Operation Esmeralda (Emerald) was launched with the objective of clearing and regaining control of Pedra Verde, the UPA’s last stronghold in northern Angola. The operation was carried out by the Special Caçadores Battalion 261, supported by paratroopers, artillery, armored vehicles, and air units. The initial assault was repelled by UPA forces, resulting in significant Portuguese casualties. After regrouping, the Portuguese mounted a second offensive several days later and ultimately secured Pedra Verde on 16 September.

On 9 June, the United Nations Security Council adopted Resolution 163, declaring Angola a non-self-governing territory and calling on Portugal to desist from repressive measures against the Angolan people. The resolution was approved with the votes of China, United States, Soviet Union and of all the non-permanent members, with the abstaining of France and the United Kingdom.

The major military operations finally terminated on 3 October, when a platoon of the Artillery Company 100 reoccupied Caiongo, in the circle of Alto Cauale, Uíge, the last abandoned administrative post that remained unrecovered. This reoccupation ended the almost six-month period during which the UPA fighters were able to control a geographic area with four times the size of European Portugal.

In a speech made on 7 October, the Governor-General and Commanding-in-Chief Venâncio Deslandes announces the termination of the military operations and that from then only police operations would be carried out, although partly in military scope.

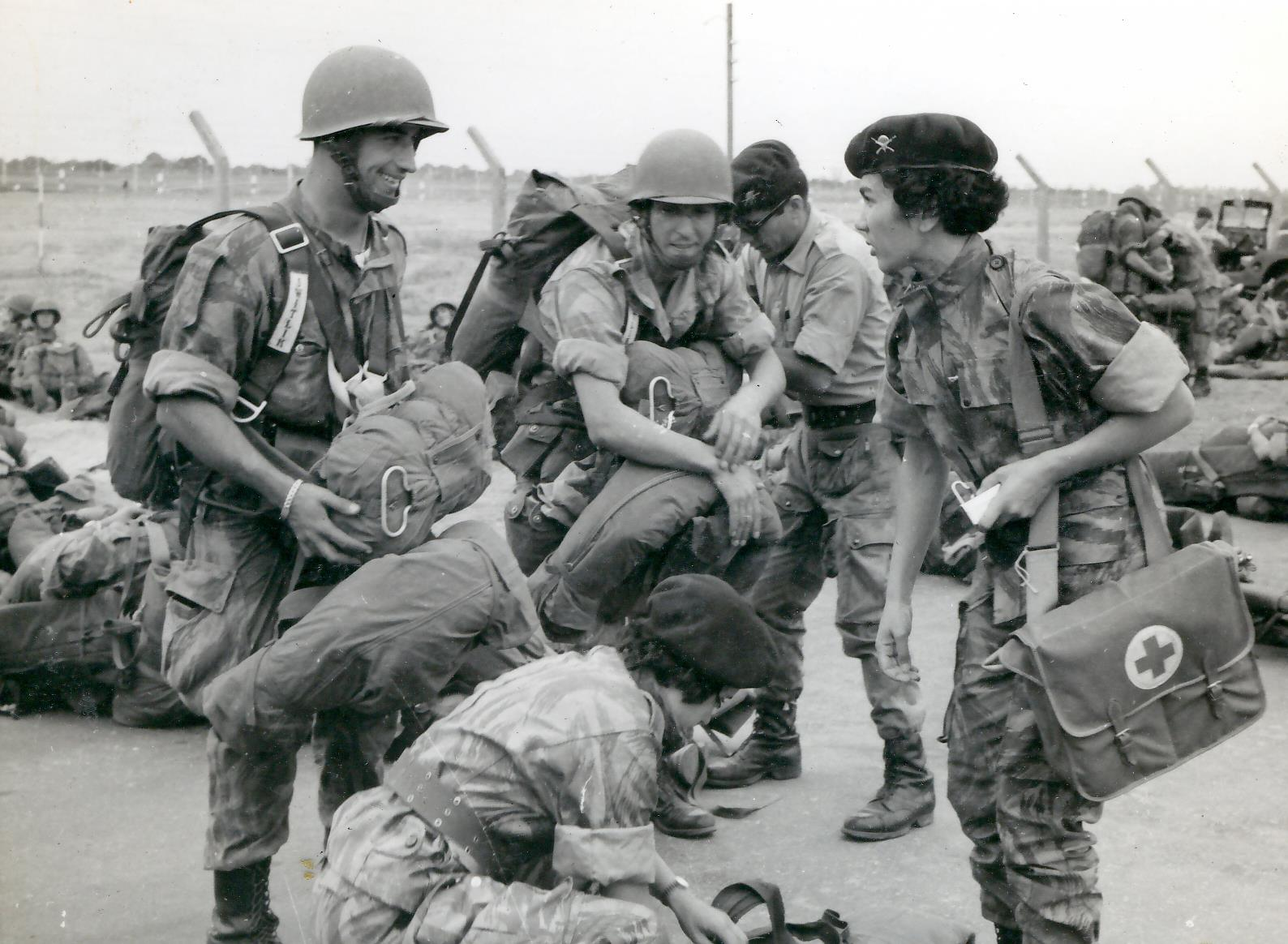
Portuguese paratrooper nurse.

During an air reconnaissance in southern Angola on 10 November, the aircraft that was carrying General Silva Freire and his staff crashed, killing him and almost all the officers of the headquarters of the land forces of Angola. Because of this crash, General Francisco Holbeche Fino was appointed commander of the 3rd Military Region.

In the first year of the war, 20,000 to 30,000 Angolans were killed, and between 300,000 and 500,000 refugees fled to Zaïre or Luanda. UPA militants joined pro-independence refugees and continued to launch attacks from across the border in Zaire, creating more refugees and terror among local communities. A UPA patrol took 21 MPLA militant prisoners and then executed them on 9 October 1961 in the Ferreira incident, sparking further violence between the two sides.

Holden Roberto merged UPA with the Democratic Party of Angola (PDA) to form the National Liberation Front of Angola (FNLA) in March 1962. A few weeks later he established the Revolutionary Government of Angola in Exile (GRAE) on 27 March, appointing Jonas Savimbi to the position of Foreign Minister. Roberto established a political alliance with Zairian President Mobutu Sese Seko by divorcing his wife and marrying a woman from Mobutu's wife's village. Roberto visited Israel and received aid from the Israeli government from 1963 to 1969.

Romania was the first state to sign agreements with the MPLA. In May 1974, Nicolae Ceaușescu reaffirmed Romania's support for Angolan independence. As late as September 1975, Bucharest publicly supported all three Angolan liberation movements (FNLA, MPLA and UNITA).

The MPLA held a party congress in Leopoldville in 1962, during which, Viriato da Cruz – found to be slow, negligent, and adverse to planning – was replaced by Agostinho Neto. In addition to the change in leadership, the MPLA adopted and reaffirmed its policies for an independent Angola:

- Democracy
- Multiracialism
- Non-alignment
- Nationalization
- National liberation of the entire colony
- No foreign military bases in Angola

Savimbi left the FNLA in 1964 and founded UNITA in response to Roberto's unwillingness to spread the war outside the traditional Kingdom of Kongo. Neto met Marxist leader Che Guevara in 1965 and soon received funding from the governments of Cuba, German Democratic Republic, and the Soviet Union.

=== Opening of the Eastern Front ===
In May 1966, Daniel Chipenda, then a member of MPLA, established the Frente Leste (Eastern Front), significantly expanding the MPLA's reach in Angola. When the EF collapsed, Chipenda and Neto each blamed the other's factions.

UNITA carried out its first attack on 25 December 1966, preventing trains from passing through the Benguela railway at Teixeira de Sousa on the border with Zambia. UNITA derailed the railway twice in 1967, angering the Zambian government, which exported copper through the railway. President Kenneth Kaunda responded by kicking UNITA's 500 fighters out of Zambia. Savimbi moved to Cairo, Egypt, where he lived for a year. He secretly entered Angola through Zambia and worked with the Portuguese military against the MPLA.

UNITA had its main base in distant south-eastern Angolan provinces, where the Portuguese and FNLA influence were for all practical purposes very low, and where there was no guerrilla war at all. UNITA was from the beginning far better organized and disciplined than either the MPLA or the FNLA. Its fighters also showed a much better understanding of guerrilla operations. They were especially active along the Benguela railway, repeatedly causing damage to the Portuguese, and to the Republic of Congo and Zambia, both of which used the railway for transportation of their exports to Angolan ports.

On 19 May 1968, FNLA entered Eastern Angola and carried out its first violent actions in the region against the local populations.

During October 1968, the Portuguese forces initiated Operation Vitória (Victory) against the MPLA, assaulting and destroying its main bases at Eastern Angola. Among others, the Mandume III base (headquarters of the MPLA's III Military Region) was assaulted by the Portuguese Commandos, leading to the capture of important documents.

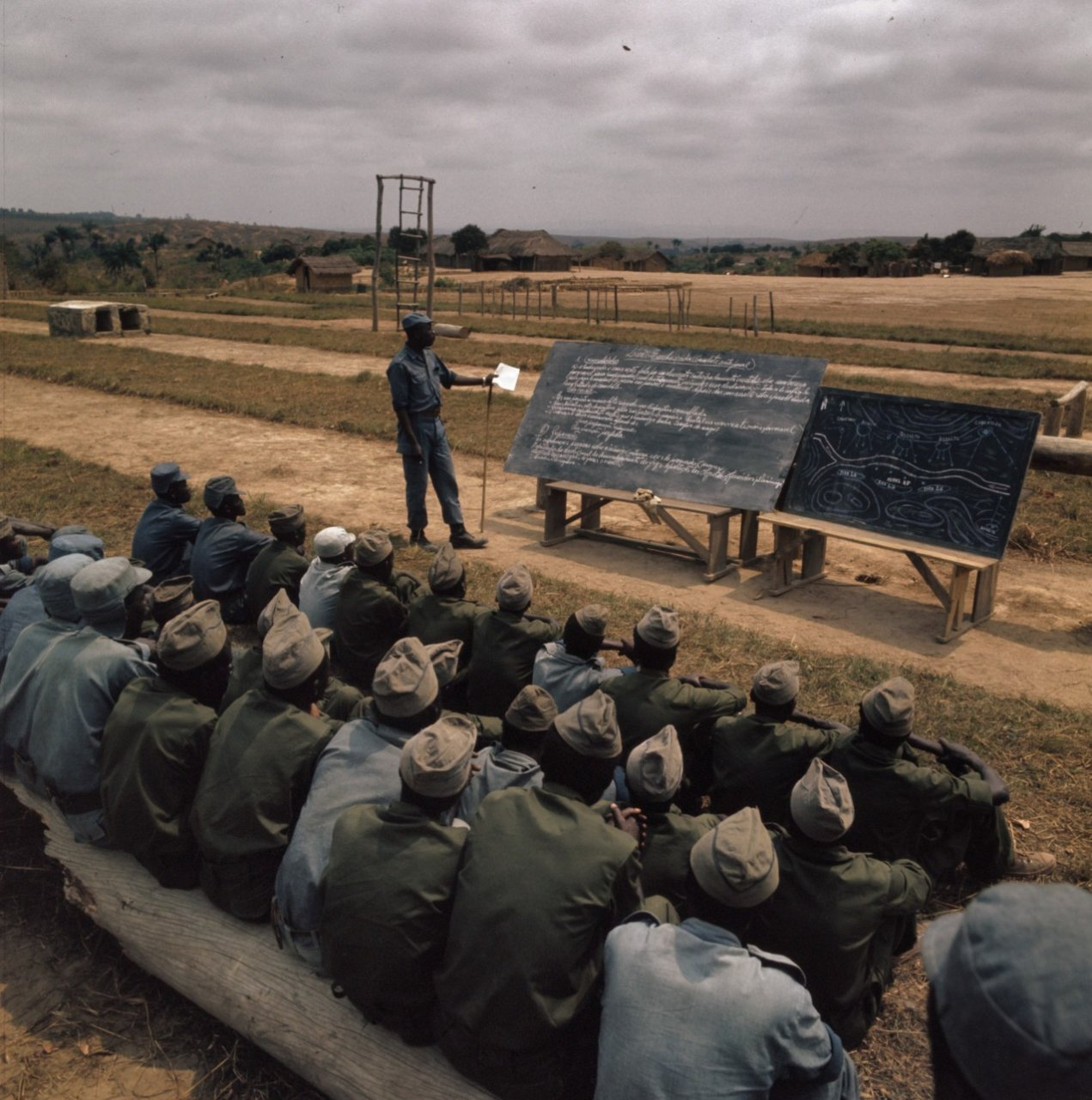
FNLA training camp in Zaire in 1973.

During the late 1960s, the FNLA and MPLA fought each other as much as they did the Portuguese, with MPLA forces assisting the Portuguese in finding FNLA hideouts.

In the late 1969, the Portuguese forces organize the Battle Group Sirocco (Agrupamento Siroco), a highly mobile composite task force aimed at hunting and destroying the guerrilla forces operating in Eastern Angola. The land component of the task force was centered in Commando companies, being supported by an air component with helicopters and light aircraft. On 1 September, Battle Group Sirocco initiated a long series of highly successful operations in the Eastern region. Battle Group Sirocco (remodeled as Sirocco 1970 and Sirocco 1971, respectively in 1970 and 1971) would be active for three years, in 1972 being replaced by the similar Battle Group Ray (Agrupamento Raio).

=== Portuguese re-focus to the east ===
The MPLA began forming squadrons of 100 to 145 militants in 1971. These squadrons, armed with 60 mm and 81 mm mortars, attacked Portuguese outposts. The Portuguese conducted counter-insurgency sweeps against MPLA forces in 1972, destroying some MPLA camps. Additionally, the South African Defence Force engaged the MPLA forces in Moxico in February 1972, destroying the Communist presence. The Portuguese Armed Forces organised a successful campaign to control and pacify the entire Eastern Front (the Frente Leste). Portuguese efforts after 1972 were aided by the defection of UNITA, which began providing intelligence on the MPLA to colonial forces. Neto, defeated, retreated with 800 militants to the Republic of the Congo. Differing factions in the MPLA then jockeyed for power until the Soviet Union allied with the Chipenda faction. On 17 March 1,000 FNLA fighters mutinied in Kinkuzu, but the Zairian army put down the rebellion on behalf of Roberto.

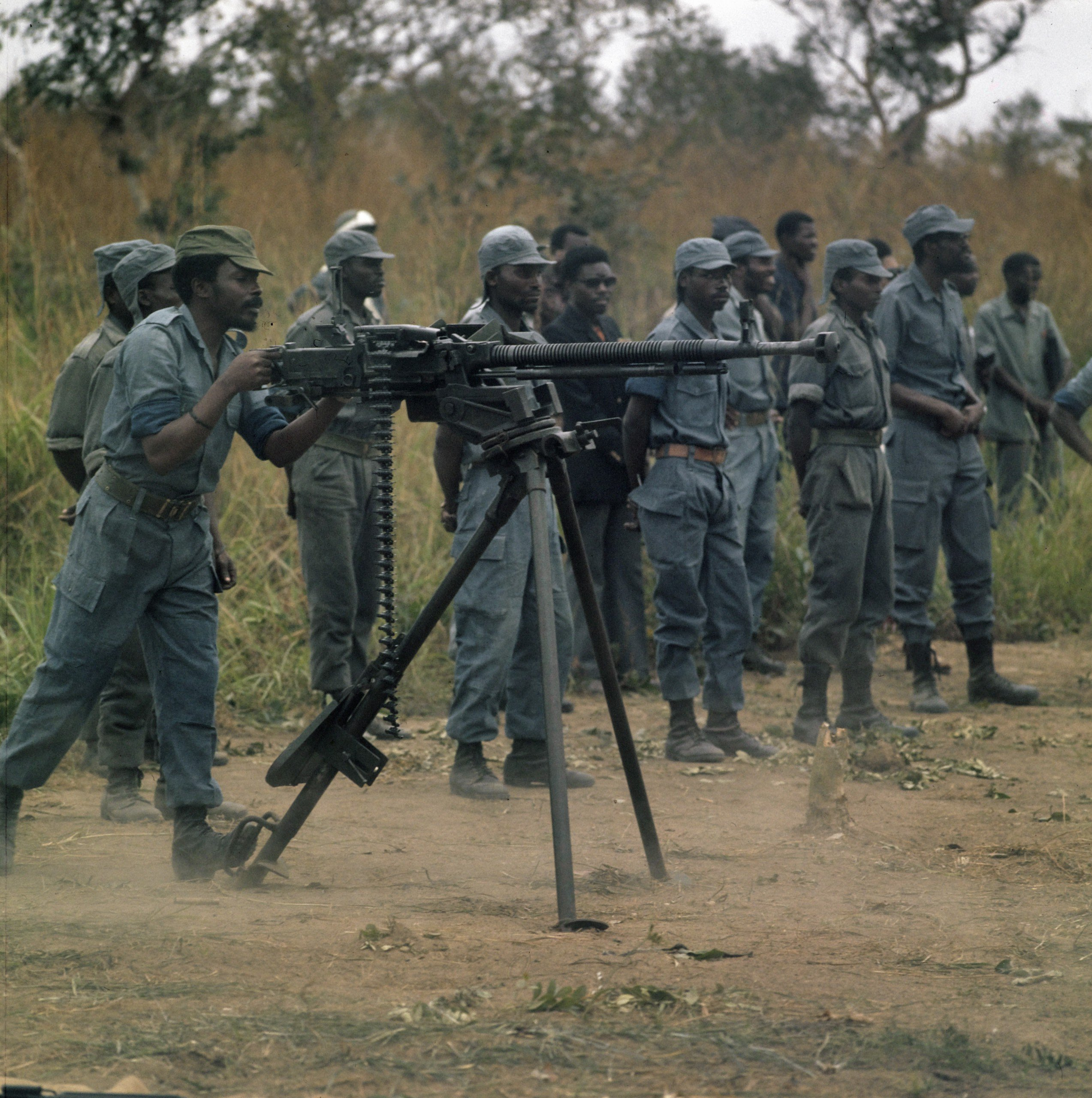
Training of F.N.L.A. soldiers in a camp in Zaire in 1973

In 1973, Chipenda left the MPLA, founding the Eastern Revolt with 1,500 former MPLA followers. Tanzanian President Julius Nyerere convinced the People's Republic of China, which had begun funding the MPLA in 1970, to ally with the FNLA against the MPLA in 1973. Roberto visited the PRC in December and secured Chinese support. The Soviet Union cut off aid to the MPLA completely in 1974 when Revolta Activa split off from the mainstream MPLA. In November the Soviet Union resumed aid to the MPLA after Neto reasserted his leadership.

The combined forces of the MPLA, the UNITA, and the FNLA succeeded in their rebellion not because of their success in battle, but because of the Movimento das Forças Armadas' coup in Portugal. The MFA was an organisation of lower-ranked officers in the Portuguese Armed Forces which was responsible for the Carnation Revolution of 25 April 1974, which ended the Portuguese Colonial War and led to the independence of the Portuguese overseas territories.

The MFA overthrew the Lisbon government in protest against the authoritarian political regime and the ongoing African colonial wars, specially the particularly demanding conflict in Portuguese Guinea. The revolutionary Portuguese government removed the remaining elements of its colonial forces and agreed to a quick handover of power to the nationalist African movements. This put an immediate end to the independence war against Portugal, but opened the door for a bitter armed conflict among the independentist forces and their respective allies. Holden Roberto, Agostinho Neto, and Jonas Savimbi met in Bukavu, Zaire in July and agreed to negotiate with the Portuguese as one political entity, but afterwards the fight broke out again.

=== End of the conflict ===
The three party leaders met again in Mombasa, Kenya on 5 January 1975 and agreed to stop fighting each other, further outlining constitutional negotiations with the Portuguese. They met for a third time, with Portuguese government officials, in Alvor, Portugal from 10 till 15 January. They signed on 15 January what became known as the Alvor Agreement, granting Angola independence on 11 November and establishing a transitional government.

The agreement ended the war for independence while marking the transition to civil war. The Front for the Liberation of the Enclave of Cabinda (FLEC) and Eastern Revolt never signed the agreement as they were excluded from negotiations. The coalition government established by the Alvor Agreement soon fell as nationalist factions, doubting one another's commitment to the peace process, tried to take control of the colony by force.

The parties agreed to hold the first assembly elections in October 1975. From 31 January until independence a transitional government consisting of the Portuguese High Commissioner Rosa Coutinho and a Prime Ministerial Council (PMC) would rule. The PMC consisted of three representatives, one from each Angolan party, and a rotating premiership among the representatives. Every decision required two-thirds majority support. The twelve ministries were divided equally among the Angolan parties and the Portuguese government: three ministries for each party. Author Witney Wright Schneidman criticized this provision in Engaging Africa: Washington and the Fall of Portugal's Colonial Empire for ensuring a "virtual paralysis in executive authority." The Bureau of Intelligence and Research cautioned that an excessive desire to preserve the balance of power in the agreement hurt the transitional Angolan government's ability to function.

The Portuguese government's main goal in negotiations was preventing the mass emigration of white Angolans. Paradoxically, the agreement only allowed the MPLA, FNLA, and UNITA to nominate candidates to the first assembly elections, deliberately disenfranchising Bakongo, Cabindans, and whites. The Portuguese reasoned that white Angolans would have to join the separatist movements and the separatists would have to moderate their platforms to expand their political bases.

The agreement called for the integration of the militant wings of the Angolan parties into a new military, the Angolan Defense Forces. The ADF would have 48,000 active personnel, made up of 24,000 Portuguese and 8,000 MPLA, FNLA, and UNITA fighters respectively. Each party maintained separate barracks and outposts. Every military decision required the unanimous consent of each party's headquarters and the joint military command. The Portuguese forces lacked equipment and commitment to the cause, while Angolan nationalists were antagonistic of each other and lacked training. The treaty, to which the Front for the Liberation of the Enclave of Cabinda (FLEC) never agreed, described Cabinda as an "integral and inalienable part of Angola". Separatists viewed the agreement as a violation of the Cabindan right to self-determination.

All three parties soon had forces greater in number than the Portuguese, endangering the colonial power's ability to keep the peace. Factional fighting renewed, reaching new heights as foreign supplies of arms increased. In February the Cuban government warned the Eastern Bloc that the Alvor Agreement would not succeed. By spring the African National Congress and the South West Africa People's Organization (SWAPO) were echoing Cuba's warning. Leaders of the Organization of African Unity organized a peace conference moderated by Kenyan President Jomo Kenyatta with the three leaders in Nakuru, Kenya in June. The Angolan leaders issued the Nakuru Declaration on 21 June, agreeing to abide by the provisions of the Alvor Agreement while acknowledging a mutual lack of trust which led to violence.

In July, fighting again broke out and the MPLA managed to force the FNLA out of Luanda; UNITA voluntarily withdrew from the capital to its stronghold in the south from where it also engaged in the struggle for the country. By August the MPLA had control of 11 of the 15 provincial capitals, including Cabinda and Luanda. On 12 August, Portugal began airlifting more than 200,000 white Portuguese Angolans from Luanda to Lisbon, via "Operation Air Bridge". South African forces invaded Angola on 23 October 1975, covertly sending 1,500 to 2,000 troops from Namibia into southern Angola. FNLA-UNITA-South African forces took five provincial capitals, including Novo Redondo and Benguela in three weeks. On 10 November the Portuguese left Angola. Cuban-MPLA forces defeated South African-FNLA forces, maintaining control over Luanda. On 11 November the MPLA declared the independence of the People's Republic of Angola. The FNLA and UNITA responded by proclaiming their own government based in Huambo. The South African Army retreated and, with the help of Cuban forces, the MPLA retook most of the south in the beginning of 1976.

Many analysts have blamed the transitional government in Portugal for the violence that followed the Alvor Agreement, criticizing the lack of concern about internal Angolan security, and the favoritism towards the MPLA. High Commissioner Coutinho, one of the seven leaders of the National Salvation Junta, openly gave Portuguese military equipment to MPLA forces. Edward Mulcahy, Acting Assistant Secretary of State for African Affairs in the United States State Department, told Tom Killoran, the U.S. Consul General in Angola, to congratulate the PMC rather than the FNLA and UNITA on their own and Coutinho for Portugal's "untiring and protracted efforts" at a peace agreement. Secretary of State Henry Kissinger considered any government involving the pro-Soviet, communist MPLA, to be unacceptable and President Gerald Ford oversaw heightened aid to the FNLA.

== Foreign influence ==
=== United States ===
The situation of the Portuguese in their overseas province of Angola soon became a matter of concern for a number of foreign powers particularly her military allies in NATO. The United States, for example, was concerned with the possibility of a Marxist regime being established in Luanda. That is why it started supplying weapons and ammunition to the UPA, which meanwhile grew considerably and merged with the Democratic Party of Angola to form the FNLA.

The leaders of the FNLA were, however, not satisfied with the US support. Savimbi consequently established good connections with the People's Republic of China, from where even larger shipments started arriving. The USA granted the company Aero Associates, from Tucson, Arizona, the permission to sell seven Douglas B-26 Invader bombers to Portugal in early 1965, despite Portugal's concerns about their support for the Marxists from Cuba and the USSR.

The aircraft were flown to Africa by John Richard Hawke – reportedly, a former Royal Air Force pilot – who on the start of one of the flights to Angola flew so low over the White House, that the United States Air Force forced him to land and he was arrested. In May 1965, Hawke was indicted for illegally selling arms and supporting the Portuguese, but was imprisoned for less than a year. The B-26s were not to see deployment in Angola until several years later.

=== Rhodesia and South Africa ===
Aside from the US, two other nations became involved in this war. These were Rhodesia and South Africa, both of which were ruled by the white minority. Their white-elected governments were concerned about their own future in the case of a Portuguese defeat. Rhodesia and South Africa initially limited their participation to shipments of arms and supplies. However, by 1968 the South Africans began providing Alouette III helicopters with crews to the Portuguese Air Force (FAP), and finally several companies of South African Defence Forces (SADF) infantry who were deployed in southern and central Angola. However, contemporary reports about them guarding the iron mines of Cassinga were never confirmed.

Finally, there were reports that a number of Rhodesian pilots were recruited to fly FAP helicopters. However, when the first Portuguese unit was equipped with Aerospatiale Puma helicopters, in 1969, its crews were almost exclusively South Africans. Rhodesian pilots were considered too valuable by the Royal Rhodesian Air Force (RRAF) to be deployed in support of the Portuguese. The SADF had pilots and helicopters operating out of the Centro Conjunto de Apoio Aéreo (CCAA – Joint Air Support Centre), setting up in Cuito Cuanavale during 1968.

=== USSR ===
During the late 1960s the USSR also became involved in the war in Angola, albeit almost exclusively via the MPLA. While the FNLA received only very limited arms shipments from the US, and the UNITA was getting hardly any support from outside the country, the Marxist MPLA developed very close relations with Moscow and was soon to start receiving significant shipments of arms via Tanzania and Zambia.

In 1969 the MPLA agreed with the USSR that in exchange for arms and supplies delivered to it the Soviets would—upon independence—be granted rights for establishing military bases in the country. Consequently, by the early 1970s, the MPLA developed into the strongest Angolan anti-colonial movement and the most powerful political party.

== Aftermath ==
Angolan Civil War, January–March 1976.

As soon as the agreement between the MPLA and Portugal for the transfer of power became known to the public, a mass exodus began. Over 300,000 people left Angola by November, most of them evacuated aboard TAP Boeing 707 aircraft. The British Royal Air Force also lent a hand, sending Vickers VC10 airliners to evacuate about 6,000 additional refugees. At this stage, the Angolan Civil War had started and spread out across the newly independent country. The devastating civil war lasted several decades and claimed a million lives and refugees in independent Angola.

In the wake of the conflict, Angola faced deterioration in central planning, economic development and growth, security, education and health system issues. Like the other newly independent African territories involved in the Portuguese Colonial War, after independence, Angola faced issues economic and social recession, corruption, poverty, inequality and failed central planning. Despite this Angola quickly reached and surpassed the standard of living prior to Portuguese colonialism by the end of the decade. A level of economic development comparable to what had existed under Portuguese rule became a major goal for the governments of the independent territory.

== See also ==
- Cuban intervention in Angola
- Portuguese Angola
- Portuguese Colonial War
