= 1940s in Angola =

Angola-related events during the 1940's

The 1940s in Angola saw the emergence of the first separatist agitation in the province of Cabinda.

== Economy ==
By 1940 the white population in Angola had risen to forty thousand, 2% of the population. Most of these émigrés, illiterate and landless, took the best farming land, regardless of availability, without compensating existing landowners. Colonial authorities expelled and enslaved natives, forcing them to harvest maize, coffee, and beans. Natives could "volunteer" to work on the plantations or face conscription, working for $1.50 per month.

António de Oliveira Salazar's system of slavery prompted 500,000 Angolans to flee, creating a labor shortage, which in turn created the need for more slaves for the colonial economy. Marcello Caetano, Salazar's Minister of Colonies, recognized the inherent flaws in the system, which he described as using natives "like pieces of equipment without any concern for their yearning, interests, or desires". in 1947, Parliament held a closed session to discuss the deteriorating situation. Henrique Galvão, Angolan deputy to the National Assembly, read his "Report on Native Problems in the Portuguese Colonies". Galvão condemned the "shameful outrages" he had uncovered, the enslavement of "women, of children, of the sick, [and] of decrepit old men." He concluded that in Angola, "only the dead are really exempt from forced labor." As much as 30% of all Angolan slaves died. The government's control over the natives eliminated the slave-owner's incentive to keep his slaves alive because, unlike in other slave-master societies, the state replaced deceased slaves without directly charging the slave owner. Salazar ignored Galvão's report and had him arrested in 1952. By the 1950s Angolan Communists actively campaigned against the Salazar government's control over Angola.

== Politics ==
Cabindans rallied for independence from Portugal in 1946. The Portuguese colonial authorities responded by deporting separatists to Baía dos Tigres where they held and tortured them.

In 1948, Viriato da Cruz and others formed the Movement of Young Intellectuals, an organization that promoted Angolan culture. Nationalists sent a letter to the United Nations calling for Angola to be given protectorate status under UN supervision.

Colonial authorities established the Mission of Angola in 1941 and the Center of Overseas Geography and Anais, an annual publication, in 1946.

Agostinho Neto, the future President of Angola, traveled to Portugal in 1947, studying medicine at the University of Coimbra.

== Colonial governors ==
1. Manoel da Cunha e Costa Marquês Mano, High Commissioner of Angola (1939–1941)
2. Abel de Abreu Souto-Maior, High Commissioner of Angola (1941–1942)
3. Vasco Lopes Alves, High Commissioner of Angola (1943–1947)
4. Fernando Falcão Pacheco Mena, High Commissioner of Angola (1947)

== See also ==
- Portuguese West Africa
