= Daniel Chipenda =

- Born: 15 May 1931; Lobito, Portuguese Angola
- Died: 28 February 1996 (aged 64)
- Military career
- Allegiance: People's Movement for the Liberation of Angola
- Branch: Eastern Revolt
- Commands: Eastern Revolt
- Conflicts: Angolan War of Independence

Daniel Chipenda (15 May 1931, Lobito - 28 February 1996) was an Angolan revolutionary that fought in the Angolan War of Independence, serving as the People's Movement for the Liberation of Angola's (MPLA) field commander in the Eastern Front before founding and leading the Eastern Revolt, a faction of the MPLA. He later joined the National Liberation Front of Angola (FNLA), but left, rejoined the MPLA, and left again in July 1992.

Chipenda, then a member of the MPLA, established the Eastern Front, significantly expanding the MPLA's reach, in May 1966. When the EF collapsed, Chipenda and MPLA leader Agostinho Neto each blamed the other. In 1972 the Soviet Union allied with Chipenda's faction, giving him aid. Following the Carnation Revolution in Portugal in 1974, Joaquim Pinto de Andrade, the President of the MPLA, organized an MPLA congress in Lusaka. Neto and Chipenda attended with 165 delegates respectively and Mário Pinto de Andrade's Active Revolt faction had 70 delegates present. After several days of negotiations Neto's faction quit the congress, so that the MPLA remained split into three factions. Chipenda left the MPLA, although he arguably left it before the coup in Portugal, founding the Eastern Revolt with 1,500 former MPLA followers. He opposed the MPLA's leadership which he accused of being "creole" and was wary of the Soviet Union, despite its support.

In 1973 the government of the Soviet Union invited Neto to Moscow and told him Chipenda planned to assassinate him. The USSR resumed aid to the MPLA, Neto again firmly in control, in 1974. In September Chipenda joined the FNLA again, and returned to the MPLA only after the multiparty elections of 1992.
