= Gentil Ferreira Viana =

Gentil Ferreira Viana (2 June 1935 – 23 February 2008) was among the founders of the Popular Movement for the Liberation of Angola (MPLA), one of the separatist organizations that helped gain independence for Angola.

In 1974, he and Joaquim Pinto de Andrade broke away from the MPLA and formed the Revolta Activa. This faction later rejoined the MPLA.

Late in life, the two men, longtime friends and colleagues, died on the same day in 2008.
