= UPLA (disambiguation) =

UPLA may refer to:

Education:

- Los Andes Peruvian University, a university in Peru
- Universidad de Playa Ancha, a university in Chile

Political parties:

- Union of Latin American Parties, an organisation for centre-right political parties in Latin America
- Party of the United Struggle for Africans in Angola
