= MYI =

MYI may refer to:

- Movement of Young Intellectuals, a defunct Angolan nationalist and cultural organization
- MYI, the IATA airport code Murray Island Airport, Queensland, Australia
- MYI, the LSE code for Murray International Trust, a large British investment trust
