= Henda Ducados =

Angolan economist

Henda Ducados Pinto de Andrade
- Born: 14 July 1964 (age 62); Rabat, Morocco
- Education: Loyola University, University of Sussex; London School of Economics
- Occupations: Economist and microcredit expert
- Parents: Mário Pinto de Andrade (father); Sarah Maldoror (mother)

Henda Ducados Pinto de Andrade (born 14 July 1964) is a French-Angolan economist and sociologist. Ducados was an early promoter of microcredit in Angola. She has directed external communications for a division of the French oil company Total since 2010.

== Life ==
=== Youth and education ===
Henda Ducados Pinto de Andrade was born in 1964 in the Moroccan capital city, Rabat, where her father Mário Pinto de Andrade was a well-known resistance fighter against Portuguese colonial power in Angola. He was elected chairman of the Angolan liberation movement MPLA in 1960, which he had helped found. He served as coordinator of Portuguese colonial organizations (Conferência das Organizações das Colónias Portuguesas (CONCP)). The aim of CONCP, founded in Casablanca, Morocco in 1961, was to connect and support the independence movements in the Portuguese colonies of Africa.

Her mother, Sarah Maldoror, was a French-born filmmaker with Guadeloupean parents, citizens who had migrated to France. She and De Andrade had two daughters, Annouchka and Henda de Andrade.

In 1966, the family moved to Algiers, Algeria, where they were accepted by the Algerian independence movement FLN (National Liberation Front). The Algerian President Ahmed Ben Bella provided the family with a residence in Bab El Oued, a suburb of Algiers. Henda's father worked for the FLN and tried to support the MPLA party in Angola from Algeria; resistance movements struggled to gain independence in Angola from Portugal.

Meanwhile, her mother produced films for the FLN army. (Among other projects, she worked with Gillo Pontecorvo on his 1966 film Battle of Algiers.) In 1970, an incident between the filmmaker and a general of the FLN army resulted in her arrest and subsequent deportation.

The mother moved with her two daughters to the Paris suburb of Saint-Denis. Here Henda Ducados attended elementary and secondary school. Her father stayed in Africa. After he fell out with the MPLA, he lived in various former Portuguese colonies in Africa. The family members rarely saw each other.

In the 1980s, Henda Ducados moved to Chicago. She enrolled at Loyola University, where she earned a bachelor's degree in economics in 1992.

=== Advocate of microcredit in Angola ===
During her studies at Loyola University, Ducados became interested in the principles of microcredit developed by Grameen Bank, which had become successful in Bangladesh. She decided to move to Angola in 1992, where she learned Portuguese and led a microcredit pilot project for an NGO there. She received a scholarship to learn more about the principles of microcredit on-site in Bangladesh.

In 1998, she founded the Rede Mulher (Women's Network) in Angola, an exchange and networking platform for women using microfinancing techniques.

At the same time, she deepened her studies in economics and development with a focus on microcredits as part of a Masters at the Institute for Development Studies at the University of Sussex. She graduated in 1998. To this she added a degree (MPhil) in "Gender and Development" at the London School of Economics and Political Science in 2001. Her final paper was entitled "Women in War-Torn Societies: A Study of Households in Luanda's Peri-Urban Areas."

=== Professional positions ===
In 2001, Ducados became deputy head of the Social Action Fund funded by the World Bank.

In 2008, she took over the external communications unit for the Angolan branch of the French oil company Total.

== Selected works ==
- "An All Men's Show? Angolan Women's Survival in the 30-Year War", in: Women and the Aftermath, Ausgabe 43, 2000, Seiten 11–22
- with Kajsa Pehrsson, Gabriela Cohen and Paulette Lopes. Towards gender equality in Angola: a profile on gender relations. Sida, Stockholm 2000. ISBN 9158689907.
- with Naiole Cohen dos Santos: Beyond inequalities: women in Angola: a profile of women in Angola. 2000. ISBN 0797417508.
- Pinto de Andrade: An intimate look. Caxinde Tea, Luanda 2009. ISBN 9789728934859
- Women in War-Torn Societies: A Study of Households in Luanda's Peri-Urban Areas. London School of Economics and Political Science, 2007, (English).
