= Ilídio Machado =

Angolan politician (1914–1983)

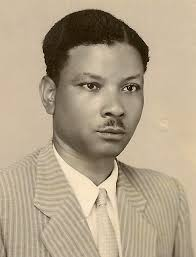

1st President of the Popular Movement for the Liberation of Angola
- In office 1956–1959
- Preceded by: Position established
- Succeeded by: Mário Pinto de Andrade

Personal details
- Born: Ilídio Tomé Alves Machado; December 17, 1914 Novo Redondo, Portuguese Angola
- Died: August 28, 1983 Angola
- Party: MPLA
- Other political affiliations: Angolan Communist Party
- Parent(s): Domingos José Alves Machado; Balbina Domingos
- Nickname: Paulo Costa

Ilídio Tomé Alves Machado (December 17, 1914 – August 28, 1983) was an Angolan politician, militant, and Telegraph employee who co-founded the Popular Movement for the Liberation of Angola in 1956 and served as its first president until his arrest in 1959.

== Early life ==
Machado was born in Novo Redondo on 17 December 1914 to Domingos José Alves Machado and Balbina Domingos as a member of the Kimbundu tribe with some Brazilian descent. His brothers, Humberto Machado and Américo Alves Machado, were other prominent figures in the Angolan nationalist struggle. He worked as a postal officer for the Directorate of Postal and Telecommunications Services.

== Activism ==
Machado was a high-ranking member of the Angolan Communist Party, and helped co-found the MPLA with Viriato da Cruz, Mário Pinto de Andrade, and Lúcio Lara on 10 December 1956 where he served as its first president until his arrest for "subversive activities against the Portuguese Government" in 1959, where he was succeeded by Mário Pinto de Andrade in an acting capacity until 1956 and then by Agostinho Neto.

Machado was arrested in Lisbon on 27 May 1959 and was tried in the Territorial Military Court of Angola where he was found guilty in 1961 and sentenced to 4 years in prison. Machado was released on parole in 1965.

Even while imprisoned, the MPLA maintained him as honorary vice-president from 1961 onward. Under constant monitoring after his conditional release, with a mandatory permanent residence in Luanda, he distanced himself from nationalist movements until 1974, when, after the Carnation Revolution, he became involved in attempts to reunify the Revolta Activa movement with the MPLA party.

Still deprived of his political rights, he was assigned by the MPLA to secretly reorganize the party's structures in Luanda, working to form party committees on the outskirts of the Angolan capital, particularly participating in the Political Action Committee.

He became the first Director-General of the Angolan Post Office in the post-independence period in 1975, leaving this position in 1979 to take on the role of Vice-Minister of Communications, a position he held until his death in 1983.

== Legacy ==
Machado was honored by the MPLA in 2018 for his role in securing Angolan independence and was officially recognized as the party's first president. However, his designation as the first President of the MPLA is disputed, as some scholars view his role in the creation of the party as trivial.
