= Correios de Angola =

Company responsible for postal service in Angola

- Empresa Nacional de Correios e Telégrafos de Angola
- Logo of Correios de Angola

Postal Administration overview
- Formed: December 7, 1798; 227 years ago
- Headquarters: Largo Fernando Coelho da Cruz, n.º 12 – 1.º, Rua do 1º Congresso do MPLA 12, Luanda, Angola
- Motto: Tudo por si
- Website: https://www.correiosdeangola.ao/

Empresa Nacional de Correios e Telégrafos de Angola (lit. 'National Post and Telegraph Company of Angola', abbr. ENCTA), operating as Correios de Angola (Portuguese pronunciation: [kuˈʁɐjuʒ ðɨ ɐ̃ˈɡɔlɐ], lit. 'Post of Angola'), is the state-owned company responsible for postal service in Angola.

The oldest continuously operating Angolan company, it began operations on December 7, 1798, under the name "Service of Letter Post in Angola".

In 1880, postal services in Portugal and the colonies were centralized under the authority of the Directorate-General of Posts, Telegraphs and Lighthouses, which maintained regional directorates, including one in Luanda.

The transformations imposed by the Angolan War of Independence necessitated Organic Decree No. 492 of October 4, 1973, issued by the then Minister of Overseas Territories, which decentralized the service and made the Directorate of Postal and Telecommunications Services of Angola autonomous again.

The postal service was nationalized in November 1975. The first Angolan to head the Directorate of Postal and Telecommunications Services was Ilídio Machado, starting in 1976.

The Directorate of Postal and Telecommunications Services of Angola was admitted to the Universal Postal Union on March 3, 1977.

In 1980, the Directorate of Postal and Telecommunications Services of Angola was affected by decrees 16/80 and 17/80 of the People's Revolutionary Council, which simultaneously separated part of the institution to form the National Telecommunications Company (ENATEL), with the original institutional structure assuming the name National Post and Telegraph Company of Angola (ENCTA).
