= Eastern Revolt =

Angolan nationalist organization

Eastern Revolt Portuguese: Revolta do Leste
- Leader: Daniel Chipenda
- Founded: 1972
- Dissolved: 1976
- Split from: MPLA
- Merged into: FNLA
- Country: Angola

The Eastern Revolt (Portuguese: Revolta do Leste; RDL), also known as the MPLA-Chipenda Faction and later as the FNLA-Chipenda Squadron, was an Angolan nationalist organization that fought in the war of independence from Portugal under the leadership of Daniel Chipenda. The RDL drew its support from the Ovimbundu ethnic group.

In May 1966, Chipenda, then a member of the Popular Movement for the Liberation of Angola (MPLA), established the Eastern Front, significantly expanding the MPLA's reach in Angola. When the EF collapsed, Chipenda and MPLA leader Agostinho Neto each blamed the other's factions. In 1972, the Soviet Union allied with Chipenda's faction, giving him aid. The Eastern Revolt also received aid from the governments of Zambia and South Africa. Chipenda left the MPLA in 1973, founding the Eastern Revolt with 1,500 former MPLA followers. He opposed the MPLA's mestizo-leadership and was wary of the Soviet Union, despite its support.

In 1973, the Soviet Union invited Neto to Moscow and told him Chipenda planned to assassinate him. Although Chipenda joined the National Liberation Front of Angola (FNLA) in September 1974, the Eastern Revolt's existence continued and RDL forces fought against the MPLA in February 1975.

Retreating from Luanda following their defeat at the Battle of Quifangondo in November 1975, the RDL—by then known as the "FNLA-Chipenda Squadron"—occupied the area along the Okavango River in the south of the country, between Menongue and Dirico, as well as the base at Cuito Cuanavale; these units were under Chipenda’s command. In March 1976, as Angolan-Cuban troops advanced—and lacking the weaponry or personnel to confront them—the RDL abandoned Angola and fled to Namibia (at the time occupied by South Africa). They became the primary foundation for the formation of South Africa’s elite 32 Battalion, the apartheid regime’s "foreign legion". The 32 Battalion was further reinforced by UNITA soldiers who had also fled the advance of the Angolan-Cuban forces, and it subsequently participated in incursions into Angola on behalf of the apartheid regime. The RDL, therefore, ceased to exist as it was absorbed by South Africa.
