= Provincial organization of volunteers and civil defence =

The provincial organization of volunteers and civil defence (Portuguese: organização provincial de voluntários e defesa civil) or OPVDC was a former militia type force in each of the Portuguese Overseas provinces. There were three such organizations, raised by the Portuguese Government, in their overseas provinces of Angola, Mozambique and Timor.

The OPVDC had the tasks of auxiliary internal security force and civil defense organization, under the authority of the governor of the province. The OPVDC of Angola and Mozambique were engaged in the Portuguese Colonial War as auxiliary forces of the Portuguese Armed Forces.

The OPVDC had analogous functions of those of Portuguese Legion that existed in the European Portugal and - despite foreseen - never expanded to the Portuguese Overseas territories.

== Angola ==
Provincial Organization of Volunteers of Civil Defence of Angola (OPVDCA) - it characterized mainly as urban militia, initially consisting mainly of white inhabitants of Angola.

The OPVDCA was framed by active or reserve officers of the Armed Forces, but was dependent from the Civil Administration, and its maximum in the Governor-General of the province. The function of OPVDCA was essentially in defence of people, lines of communications and sensitive installations.

Members of OPVDCA volunteers were civilians who had their professions, serving in the organization part-time. Initially the OPVDCA was constituted only by white settlers, but later it became increasingly multi-racial. At its peak the OPVDCA reached more than 40,000 staff.

== Mozambique ==
Organização Provincial de Voluntários de Defesa Civil de Moçambique (OPVDCM) - (Provincial Organization of Volunteers of Civil Defence of Mozambique) (OPVDCM)

== See also ==
- Militia
- Portuguese Legion (Estado Novo)
