= Party of the United Struggle for Africans in Angola =

Party of the United Struggle for Africans in Angola Partido da Luta Unida dos Africanos de Angola
- Founder: Viriato Clemente da Cruz; Matias Miguéis
- Founded: March 1, 1953
- Dissolved: December 1956
- Preceded by: MNIA
- Succeeded by: MPLA
- Ideology: Anti-colonialism; Angolan nationalism National liberation Socialism; Progressivism; Left-wing nationalism African nationalism
- Political position: Left-wing

The Party of the United Struggle for Africans in Angola (Portuguese: Partido da Luta Unida dos Africanos de Angola; abbreviated: PLUAA) was the first political party in Angola to advocate Angolan independence from Portugal, campaigning from its founding in 1953 until it merged with the Angolan Communist Party (PCA) to form the People's Movement for the Liberation of Angola (MPLA) in December 1956.
