= José Ferreira Bossa =

José Silvestre Ferreira Bossa GOC (Safara, Moura, 20 July 1894 - 14 February 1970) was governor of Portuguese India and the Colonial Minister during the Estado Novo government of António de Oliveira Salazar.

He was the son of Eufrásio Caetano Bossa and Maria Ferreira.

On 11 May 1935 he was promoted from his position of Sub-Secretário de Estado das Colónias (Sub-Secretary of State for the Colonies), during the 7th government of António Salazar, to become the Minister Of The Colonies, until January 18, 1936 .

Between 1946 and 1947 he was appointed General Governor of Portuguese India by Portuguese President Oscar Carmona. He was greatly opposed to Goan nationalism.

On 30 April 1946 he was made a Grand Officer of the Military Order of Christ.
