= Angolan Communist Party =

Angolan Communist Party Partido Comunista Angolano
- Leader: Mário Pinto de Andrade; Joaquim Pinto de Andrade
- Founded: October 1955
- Dissolved: December 1956
- Merged into: MPLA
- Ideology: Communism; Marxism-Leninism
- Political position: Far-left

The Angolan Communist Party (Portuguese: Partido Comunista Angolano) was an underground political party in Portuguese Angola (during the Estado Novo regime), founded in October 1955, under influence from the Portuguese Communist Party. PCA was led by the brothers Mário Pinto de Andrade and Joaquim Pinto de Andrade (a Catholic priest). PCA set up clandestine schools and libraries in Luanda, and established branches in Catete and Malanje.

In December 1956 it merged into the People's Movement for the Liberation of Angola (MPLA).
