= Joaquim Pinto de Andrade =

Angolan politician (1926–2008)

Joaquim Pinto de Andrade (July 22, 1926 – February 23, 2008) served as the first honorary President of the People's Movement for the Liberation of Angola (MPLA), Chancellor of the Luanda Archdiocese, and as a member of the African Society of Culture. He died on February 23, 2008, at his home in Luanda following a long illness, the same day as fellow MPLA politician Gentil Ferreira Viana.

Pinto de Andrade was arrested by the Portuguese security forces after the start of the Angolan War of Independence in July 1961 and was kept in prison or under house arrest until being brought to trial in Lisbon in February 1971 charged with crimes against the security of the State. His trial with nine other people provoked protests including a strike at Coimbra University.

In the 1990s, Pinto de Andrade abandoned his condition of a Catholic priest and married to Vitória Almeida e Sousa, a pediatrician. They had two children.

== Awards ==
- Pax Christi International Peace Award, 1992
