= Movement of Young Intellectuals =

Defunct Angolan nationalist and cultural organization

- Abbreviation: MYI
- Founder: Viriato da Cruz
- Founded: 1948
- Ideology: Angolan nationalism

The Movement of Young Intellectuals (MYI) is a defunct Angolan nationalist and cultural organization. Viriato da Cruz and others formed the MYI in 1948. The MYI sent a letter to the United Nations calling for Angola to be given protectorate status under United Nations supervision.
