= Viriato da Cruz =

Angolan poet and politician

Personal details
- Born: 25 March 1928 Porto Amboim, Cuanza Sul, Portuguese West Africa
- Died: 13 June 1973 (aged 45) Beijing, People's Republic of China
- Party: PLUAA; MPLA
- Occupation: Revolutionary, politician and poet

Viriato Clemente da Cruz (25 March 1928 – 13 June 1973) was an Angolan poet and politician, who was born in Kikuvo, Porto Amboim, Portuguese Angola, and died in Beijing, People's Republic of China. He is considered one of the most important Angolan poets of his time. He wrote poems in Portuguese, some of which include phrases in the Angolan Bantu language of Kimbundu. He took part in the political struggle to free Angola from Portuguese rule.

== Political work ==
Cruz was educated in Luanda, the capital of Angola, which was then ruled by Portugal. Between 1948 and 1952, Viriato da Cruz became part of the Association of the Native Sons of Angola. In 1948, he helped found the Movement of the New Intellectuals of Angola.

Suffering from tuberculosis, Da Cruz retreated to southern Angola in 1948 and 1949. There he wrote poems that established him as the most important Angolan lyrical poet of his generation. He returned to Luanda, the capital, and was a central figure in the literary magazine Mensagem, which developed the idea of an Angolan nation. By the early 1950s he had ceased writing poetry to devote most of his time to revolutionary, anti-colonial politics.

In 1956 Viriato da Cruz, in Luanda, wrote the manifesto that would become the founding document of the MPLA (Movimento Popular de Libertação de Angola). On September 30, 1957, Da Cruz left for Lisbon, with the hopes of recruiting advice and support from the Partido Comunista Portugués (PCP). His call for help went unanswered by the PCP. Da Cruz went on to Paris and Frankfurt, where Mário Pinto de Andrade and Lúcio Lara contributed to the revision of his manifesto. At a conference in Tunis in 1960, Viriato da Cruz became the first person to utter the new organization's name in public.

The MPLA was not in Angola at this time, but was first in Conakry (the capital of Guinea) and then later in Leopoldville, Congo (now Kinshasa, the capital of the DRC). Cruz became secretary-general of the MPLA. After some time he and others did not agree with the party leadership, in particular with president Agostinho Neto. The main source of conflict was race. Though himself a mestiço (mixed-race person), Viriato believed that leadership positions in the MPLA should be reserved for Black Africans. Beginning in 1962, Neto recruited highly educated mestiços to serve on the MPLA's Central Committee. In the mid-1960s Neto opened the MPLA to anti-colonialist white Angolans and endorsed a policy of multiracialism in the movement.

== Exiled in China ==
In the 1960s, he moved to Algeria to run his own faction of the MPLA, popularly known as the MPLA-Viriato. He finally went to Beijing, China. At first, the Chinese government welcomed him, since he wanted to help them bring Maoist-inspired revolution to Africa. He soon fell out of favour with the Chinese government due to his support for Liu Shaoqi, who had been denounced by Mao Zedong as a "capitalist-roader". Cruz wanted to leave China and return to Africa, but the Chinese government would not allow him to go.

== Last years ==
The last years of his life were unhappy and difficult. He died on 13 June 1973. The MPLA has never acknowledged his role as the author of its founding manifesto.

== Poetry work ==
In poems such as "Mamã negra (Canto de esperança)", Viriato da Cruz explore themes of Black African identity, and the symbol of "Mother Africa".
