= MPLA =

Ruling party of Angola since 1975

People's Movement for the Liberation of Angola Movimento Popular de Libertação de Angola
- Abbreviation: MPLA
- Chairman: João Lourenço
- Secretary-General: Paulo Pombolo
- Founders: Ilídio Machado; Viriato da Cruz; Mário Pinto de Andrade; Lúcio Lara
- Founded: 10 December 1956; 69 years ago
- Merger of: PLUAA; PCA
- Headquarters: Luanda, Luanda Province
- Newspaper: Jornal de Angola
- Youth wing: Youth of MPLA; Agostinho Neto Pioneer Organization
- Women's wing: Organization of Angolan Women
- Armed wing: People's Armed Forces of Liberation of Angola (1956–1993)
- Membership (2022): ▲3,000,000
- Ideology: Democratic socialism; Angolan nationalism; Social democracy; Pan-Africanism; Left-wing nationalism; 1977–1990: Communism; Marxism-Leninism; Scientific socialism Factions: Fractionism (1975–1977)
- Political position: Centre-left to left-wing; 1977–1990: Far-left
- International affiliation: Socialist International (since 2006)
- African affiliation: FLMSA; CONCP
- Colours: Red
- Slogan: • "Peace, Work and Liberty"; • "MPLA e os Novos Desafios"
- National Assembly: 124 / 220
- SADC PF: 0 / 5
- Pan-African Parliament: 0 / 5

Party flag

Website
- mpla.ao

The People's Movement for the Liberation of Angola (Portuguese: Movimento Popular de Libertação de Angola, abbr. MPLA), from 1977 to 1990 called the People's Movement for the Liberation of Angola – Labour Party (Portuguese: Movimento Popular de Libertação de Angola – Partido do Trabalho), is an Angolan social democratic and democratic socialist political party. The MPLA fought against the Portuguese Army in the Angolan War of Independence from 1961 to 1974, and defeated the National Union for the Total Independence of Angola (UNITA) and the National Liberation Front of Angola (FNLA) in the Angolan Civil War, which has been described as "one of the longest, most brutal and deadliest wars of the last century." The party has ruled Angola since the country's independence from Portugal in 1975, being the de facto government throughout the civil war and continuing to rule afterwards.

== Formation ==
The articulation for the founding of the MPLA took place, mainly, within two political organizations: the Party of the United Struggle for Africans in Angola (PLUAA), founded in 1953 by Viriato da Cruz and Matias Miguéis, which operated incipiently until 1954 due to a lack of mass mobilization, being overshadowed by other anti-colonial political and cultural nationalist groups that already operated in Angola and Portugal, and; the Angolan Communist Party (PCA), founded in December 1955 as a Luanda-based cell of the Portuguese Communist Party (PCP), initially grouping together prominent leaders of Angolan nationalism, such as Viriato da Cruz, Ilídio Machado, Mário António and António Jacinto, and, soon after, Lúcio Lara, Mário Pinto de Andrade and Joaquim Pinto de Andrade.

The PCA leadership realized that the growth of the nationalist struggle was hindered by the reluctance to accept the Marxist-Leninist class struggle that the party proposed, as well as by the persecution imposed by the Estado Novo regime on any organization of a communist or socialist nature. Viriato da Cruz, a member of both organizations, arranged for the merger and organization of the PCA with the PLUAA — the latter a non-communist party and, from mid-1955 onwards, already with a mass popular organization. Discussions advanced towards the formation of a broad-front nationalist movement that would encompass diluted organizations within it, without using symbols or explicitly disseminating Marxist-Leninist theories. Thus, on December 10, 1956, in a meeting at Ilídio Machado's house in Luanda, he, Viriato da Cruz and Mário Pinto de Andrade wrote the "Manifesto of 1956" for a "broad Popular Movement for the Liberation of Angola", as a program for regrouping nationalist struggles. In addition to the aforementioned names who led the PLUAA and the PCA, the following joined the manifesto creating the MPLA: Liceu Vieira Dias, Chico Machado, Germano Joy Gomes, Manuel dos Santos Capicua, Noé Saúde, Deolinda Rodrigues, Manuel Bento Ribeiro, Paulo Teixeira Jorge, Adriano Sebastião Kiwima and Amílcar Cabral. Ilídio Machado, a key member of the PCA and the African National League, was elected the first president of the MPLA, remaining in office until his arrest in 1959. Anticipating the siege by the Portuguese political police, Ilídio Machado ordered the withdrawal of part of the MPLA leadership from Luanda by September 1957, entrusting Mário de Andrade and Viriato da Cruz with the formation of a foreign relations nucleus and headquarters in exile in Paris and Frankfurt am Main. Ilídio Machado, Joaquim de Andrade, Sebastião Kiwima and Manuel Pedro Pacavira remained in Luanda leading the actions of the MPLA. When arrested, Ilídio Machado was replaced by the secretary-general Mário de Andrade, who held the position in exile between 1959 and 1960; of leadership, only António Jacinto, Pacavira and Joaquim de Andrade remained in Angola coordinating the activities of the movement that still had few militants. Other groups later merged into MPLA, such as the Movement for the National Independence of Angola (MINA) and the Democratic Front for the Liberation of Angola (FDLA).

The MPLA's core base includes the Ambundu ethnic group and the educated intelligentsia of the capital city, Luanda. The party formerly had links to European and Soviet communist parties, but today is a full-member of the Socialist International grouping of social democratic parties. The armed wing of MPLA was the People's Armed Forces for the Liberation of Angola (FAPLA). The FAPLA later (1975–1991) became the national armed forces of the country when the MPLA took control of the government.

In 1961, the MPLA joined the African Party for the Independence of Guinea and Cape Verde (PAIGC), its fraternal party in Guinea-Bissau and Cabo Verde, in direct combat against the Portuguese empire in Africa. The following year, the expanded umbrella group Conference of Nationalist Organizations of the Portuguese Colonies (CONCP) replaced FRAIN, adding FRELIMO of Mozambique and the CLSTP, forerunner of the Movement for the Liberation of São Tomé and Príncipe (MLSTP).

In the early 1970s, the MPLA's guerrilla activities were reduced, due to the fierce counter-insurgency campaigns of the Portuguese military. At the same time, internal conflicts caused the movement to temporarily split into three factions (Ala Presidencialista or Presidentialist Wing, Revolta Activa or Active Revolt, and Revolta do Leste or Eastern Revolt). By 1974/75, this situation had been overcome with renewed cooperation, but it scarred the party.

== Independence and civil war ==
The Carnation Revolution in Lisbon, Portugal in 1974 established a military government. It promptly ceased anti-independence fighting in Angola and agreed to transfer power to a coalition of three pro-independence Angolan movements.

The coalition quickly broke down and the newly independent Angola broke into a state of civil war. Maintaining control over Luanda and the lucrative oil fields of the Atlantic coastline, Agostinho Neto, the leader of the MPLA, declared the independence of the Portuguese Overseas Province of Angola as the People's Republic of Angola on 11 November 1975, in accordance with the Alvor Accords.

UNITA and FNLA together declared Angolan independence in Huambo. These differences reignited civil war between UNITA & FNLA and the MPLA, with the latter winning the upper hand. Agostinho Neto became the first president upon independence. He was succeeded after his death in 1979 by José Eduardo dos Santos.

MPLA poster. The slogan translates as "Victory is certain".

In 1974–1976, South Africa and Zaire intervened militarily in favor of FNLA and UNITA. The United States strongly aided the two groups. Cuba in turn intervened in 1975 to aid the MPLA against South African intervention, and the Soviet Union aided both Cuba and the MPLA government during the war.

In November 1980, the MPLA had all but pushed UNITA into the bush, and the South African forces withdrew. The United States Congress barred further U.S. military involvement in the country, against the wishes of President Ronald Reagan, as the representatives feared getting into a situation similar to the Vietnam War. In 1976 the FNLA withdrew its troops to their bases in Zaire. Part of them joined the 32 Battalion, formed by South Africa in order to receive anti-MPLA Angolans.

At its first congress in 1977, the MPLA adopted Marxism–Leninism as the party ideology. It added Partido do Trabalho (Labour Party) to its name.

After Nito Alves's attempted coup in 1977, Neto ordered the killing of suspected followers and sympathisers of "orthodox communism" inside and outside the party. During the coup, Cuban forces stationed in Angola sided with the MPLA leadership against the coup organizers. Estimates for the number of Alves' followers killed by Cuban and MPLA troops in the aftermath range from 2,000 — 70,000 dead, with some placing the death toll at 18,000.

After the violent internal conflict called Fractionism, the MPLA declared that it would follow the socialist, not the communist, model. But it did maintain close ties with the Soviet Union and the Communist bloc, establishing socialist economic policies and a one-party state. Several thousand Cuban troops remained in the country to combat UNITA fighters and bolster the regime's security.

When the Cold War ended and the Soviet Union fell, the MPLA abandoned its Marxist–Leninist ideology. On its third congress in December 1990, it declared social democracy to be its official ideology.

The MPLA emerged victorious in Angola's 1992 general election. The election was considered free and fair by election monitors. but eight opposition parties rejected the election as rigged. UNITA sent negotiators to Luanda, where they were killed. As a consequence, hostilities erupted in the city, and immediately spread to other parts of the country. Tens of thousands of UNITA and FNLA sympathizers were subsequently killed nationwide by MPLA forces, in what is known as the Halloween Massacre. The civil war resumed.

The war continued until 2002, when UNITA leader Jonas Savimbi was killed. The two parties agreed to a ceasefire, and a plan was laid out for UNITA to demobilize and become a political party. More than 500,000 civilians were killed during the civil war. Anticommunist political scientist Rudolph Rummel estimated that the MPLA were responsible for between 100,000 and 200,000 deaths in democide from 1975 to 1987.

== Human rights record ==
The MPLA government of Angola has been accused of human rights violations such as arbitrary arrest and detention and torture by international organisations, including Amnesty International and Human Rights Watch. The MPLA government hired Samuels International Associates Inc in 2008 to help improve Angola's global image and "'facilitate' its meetings with senior U.S. officials".

== Party organizations ==
At present, major mass organizations of the MPLA-PT include the Angolan Women's Organization (Organização da Mulher Angolana or O.M.A.), National Union of Angolan Workers (União Nacional dos Trabalhadores Angolanos or U.N.T.A.), Agostinho Neto Pioneer Organization (Organização de Pioneiros de Agostinho Neto or O.P.A.), and the Youth of MPLA (Juventude do MPLA or J.M.P.L.A.).

== Foreign support ==
During both the Portuguese Colonial War and the Angolan Civil War, the MPLA received military and humanitarian support primarily from the governments of Algeria, Brazil, the Bulgarian People's Republic, East Germany, Cape Verde, Czechoslovak Socialist Republic, the Congo, Cuba, Guinea-Bissau, Mexico, Morocco, the Mozambican People's Republic, Nigeria, North Korea, the Polish People's Republic, China, the Romanian Socialist Republic, São Tomé and Príncipe, Somalia, the Soviet Union, Sudan, Tanzania, Libya and SFR Yugoslavia. While China did briefly support the MPLA, it also actively supported the MPLA's enemies, the FNLA and later UNITA, during the war for independence and the civil war. The switch was the result of tensions between China and the Soviet Union for dominance of the communist bloc, which almost led to war.

== Electoral history ==
In the 1992 election, MPLA-PT won 53.74% of the votes and 129 out of 227 seats in parliament; however, eight opposition parties rejected the 1992 elections as rigged. In the next election, delayed until 2008 due to the civil war, the MPLA won 81.64% of the vote and 191 out of 220 parliamentary seats. In the 2012 legislative election, the party won 71.84% of the vote and 175 of 220 parliamentary seats.

In the 2022 general election, MPLA won 124 parliamentary seats and about 51% of the vote. The largest opposition party, UNITA, secured 44% of the vote and 90 parliamentary seats. The tight race was the MPLA's worst showing at the polls in 30 years. However, nearly all opposition parties considered the result to be a fake.

=== Presidential elections ===
Election	Party candidate	Votes	%	Result
1992	José Eduardo dos Santos	1,953,335	49.57%	Elected ✓
2012	José Eduardo dos Santos	4,135,503	71.85%	Elected ✓
2017	João Lourenço	4,907,057	61.08%	Elected ✓
2022	João Lourenço	3,209,429	51.17%	Elected ✓

=== National Assembly elections ===
Election	Party leader	Votes	%	Seats	+/–	Position	Result
1980	José Eduardo dos Santos	Indirect election		229 / 229	New	▲1st	Sole legal party
1986	José Eduardo dos Santos	Indirect election		173 / 290	▼56	1st	Sole legal party
1992	José Eduardo dos Santos	2,124,126	53.74%	129 / 220	▼44	1st	Majority government
2008	José Eduardo dos Santos	5,266,216	81.64%	191 / 220	▲62	1st	Supermajority government
2012	José Eduardo dos Santos	4,135,503	71.85%	175 / 220	▼16	1st	Supermajority government
2017	João Lourenço	4,907,057	61.08%	150 / 220	▼25	1st	Supermajority government
2022	João Lourenço	3,209,429	51.17%	124 / 220	▼26	1st	Majority government

== In popular culture ==
- In 1976, reggae singer Tapper Zukie dedicated the song and album titled "M.P.L.A" to the movement.
- Pablo Moses dedicated the song "We Should be in Angola" (which appeared on his album Revolutionary Dream) to the MPLA.
- The Sex Pistols singer John Lydon referred to the MPLA in the lyrics of "Anarchy in the U.K.".
- The reggae band The Revolutionaries devoted an extended dub mix record to the movement entitled "MPLA", recorded at Channel One, engineered by King Tubby and released on the "Well Charge" label. The bass line and rhythm was based on "Freedom Blues" by Little Richard. The Revolutionaries also released an extended discomix entitled "Angola". Both tracks were later released on the Revolutionary Sounds album featuring Sly and Robbie.
- The video game Call of Duty: Black Ops II features a level in which the player fought alongside the UNITA and Jonas Savimbi against the MPLA.
- The video game Metal Gear Solid V: The Phantom Pain sets Missions 13–29 within the environs of the Angola-Zaire border region. Several references to the MPLA, CFA, and UNITA are made—with the in-universe mercenary group Diamond Dogs (led by player character Venom Snake) clashing with or aiding them in different missions.

== See also ==
- African independence movements
- Cuban intervention in Angola
- History of Angola
- List of current Angolan ministers (all MPLA members)
- Mário Pinto de Andrade
- Luzia Inglês Van-Dúnem
