= Mário Pinto de Andrade =

Angolan poet and politician (1928–1990)

Mário Coelho Pinto de Andrade
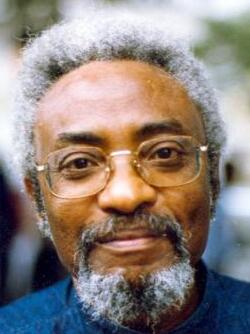
- Born: 21 August 1928; Golungo Alto, Portuguese Angola
- Died: 26 August 1990 (aged 62); London, England
- Education: University of Lisbon; Sorbonne
- Occupations: Poet and politician
- Known for: Anti-colonial activities
- Spouse: Sarah Maldoror
- Children: Henda Ducados Pinto de Andrade; Annouchka de Andrade
- Parent(s): José Cristino Pinto de Andrade; Ana Rodrigues Coelho
- Relatives: Joaquim Pinto de Andrade (brother)

Mário Coelho Pinto de Andrade (21 August 1928 – 26 August 1990) was an Angolan poet and politician.

== Biography ==
He was born in Golungo Alto, in Portuguese Angola, and studied philosophy at the University of Lisbon and sociology at the Sorbonne in Paris. While there, he became active in opposing Portuguese colonial rule of Angola, and wrote anti-colonial poetry.

In 1955, he took part in the founding of the Angolan Communist Party. In 1956, he was the founder of the Popular Movement for the Liberation of Angola (MPLA) and was elected its first President in 1960. His brother, Joaquim Pinto de Andrade, was made the MPLA's first honorary President.

He married the French filmmaker Sarah Maldoror and worked with her on Sambizanga, a 1972 film about the Angolan liberation movement. (Sarah and Mário would go on to have two daughters, Henda Ducados Pinto de Andrade and Annouchka de Andrade.)

He clashed with his successor, Agostinho Neto, and in 1974, founded within the MPLA a group called Revolta Activa (Active Revolt). Angola became independent on November 11, 1975, but Andrade continued to live in exile in Guinea-Bissau, Cape Verde and Mozambique. He died in London in 1990.

His publications included the anthologies Letteratura Negra (1961) and La Poésie Africaine d'Espression Portugaise (1969).
