= Non-aggression pact of 1979 =

1979 treaty in southern Africa

The Southern Africa Non-aggression Pact required signatory states to ensure that no individual or organization attacked a signatory state from signatory soil. Presidents Jose Eduardo dos Santos of Angola, Mobutu Sese Seko of Zaire, and Kenneth Kaunda of Zambia signed the agreement on October 14, 1979. The signatories also signed a treaty on transportation and communication cooperation the same day.

The treaty came in direct response to the Shaba I and Shaba II wars in 1977 and 1978, respectively.

== See also ==
- Alvor Agreement
- Bicesse Accords
- Brazzaville Protocol
- Lusaka Protocol
- Nakuru Agreement
