= David Schurmann =

Brazilian film director (born 1974)

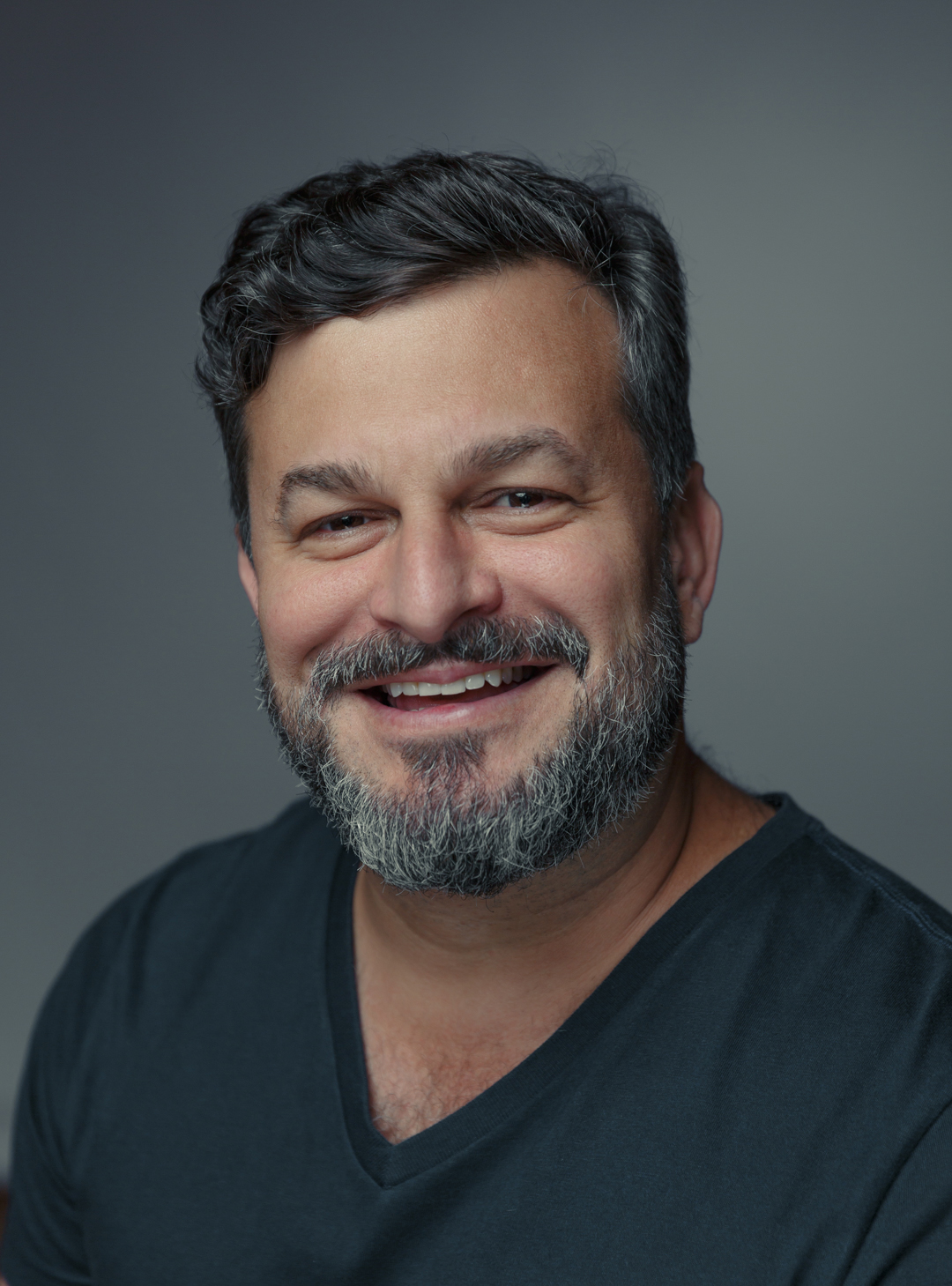
- Schurmann in 2020
- Born: 1974 (age 51–52); Florianópolis, Brazil
- Education: Auckland University of Technology, New Zealand; South Seas Film & Television School, New Zealand; Maine Media Workshops, USA
- Occupations: Film director, film producer, screenwriter, explorer & CEO
- Years active: 1992–present
- Spouses: Dionne Webster (m. 1994; div. 1997) Gabriela Tocchio dos Santos (m. 2003; div. 2012) Ellen Campahão (m. 2018)
- Children: 1
- Father: Vilfredo Schurmann
- Awards: Best film at the Recife Cinema Festival
- Website: www.schurmannfilmes.com.br

David Schurmann is a film director, producer, screenwriter, explorer, author and CEO.

== Early life ==
Schurmann started filming at age 13 during the Schurmann Family first sailing circumnavigation of the globe.

He received his formal training in film and television in New Zealand, completing his education in the United States. He has since worked as a director and producer of feature films, television programs and documentaries.

== Career ==
As producer/director/cinematographer of the Schurmann Family Adventures, he has filmed around the world, most notably during the Magellan Global Adventure (1997–2000).

In 2007, Schurmann released his first feature film, The World Twice Around, a documentary that won two awards at the Recife Cinema Festival (Cine PE), for Best Film and Best Sound Editing. In 2011 he released Missing, a suspense/horror mockumentary film.

Between 2009 and 2012, he produced and directed the documentary and series U-513 Lonely Wolf, about the search and discovery of the German submarine German submarine U-513 sunk in the coast of southern Brazil.

Schurmann then directed and produced the feature film Little Secret, based on the story of Katherine Schurmann, his adopted sister. The film, which he worked on for six years, was chose as the Brazilian submission for the Academy Award for Best International Feature Film in 2017.

In 2017, the National Geographic released the 11-part series Orient Expedition, which Schurmann directed and produced.

In 2017, Schurmann and his family founded Voice of the Oceans and officially launched it on August 29, 2021, after four years of development. The global initiative to fight plastic pollution in the oceans includes a nautical expedition, a science project, an open innovation program, and an education project. With the global support of the UN Environment Program (UNEP).

In 2022, he directed My Penguin Friend starring Jean Reno and Adriana Barraza, with photography by Anthony Dod Mantle and production design by Mercedes Alfonsin.

== Filmography ==
=== Films Fiction ===
Year	Title	Notes
2011	Missing	
2016	Little Secret	Brazilian submission for the Academy Award for Best International Feature Film
2024	My Penguin Friend	
2026	By a Thread	

=== Films Documentaries ===
Year	Title
1995	Em Busca Do Sonho
2007	The World Twice Round
2021	U-513 Lonely Wolf

=== Series Documentary ===
Year	Title	Network
1996	Get Real	
1996-2005	Magellan Global Adventure	
2017	Orient Expedition	National Geographic
2022	Voice of the Oceans Expedition	Canal Off

== Selected books ==
- Da Inspiração à Tela - a jornada de um filme - non-fiction, filmmaking book 2020.
- Ao Vento - non-fiction book 2009.
