= List of horror films of 2011 =

A list of horror films released in 2011.

Horror films released in 2011
Title	Director	Cast	Country	Notes
11-11-11	Darren Lynn Bousman	Timothy Gibbs, Michael Landes, Denis Rafter	Spain; United States	
23:59	Gilbert Chan	Mark Lee, Henley Hii, Josh Lai	Malaysia; Singapore	
Absentia	Mike Flanagan	Katie Parker, Courtney Bell, Dave Levine	United States	
The Afflicted	Jason Stoddard	Kane Hodder, Leslie Easterbrook, J.D. Hart	United States	
All Superheroes Must Die	Jason Trost	Jason Trost, Lucas Till, James Remar	United States	Science fiction horror
Apartment 143	Carles Torrens	Kai Lennox, Michael O'Keefe, Gia Mantegna	Spain	
Apollo 18	Gonzalo López-Gallego	Warren Christie, Lloyd Owen, Ryan Robbins	United States	Science-fiction horror
The Awakening	Nick Murphy	Rebecca Hall, Dominic West, Imelda Staunton	United Kingdom	
Bag of Bones	Mick Garris	Pierce Brosnan, Jason Priestley, Melissa George	United States	
Blood Runs Cold	Sonny Laguna		Sweden	
Bloody Bloody Bible Camp	Vito Trabucco	Reggie Bannister, Tim Sullivan, Ron Jeremy	United States	
Bulong	Chito S. Roño	Vhong Navarro, Angelica Panganiban	Philippines	
The Cat	Byun Seung-wook	Park Min-young, Kim Dong-wook, Kim Ye-ron	South Korea	
Chillerama	Tim Sullivan, Adam Rifkin, Adam Green, Joe Lynch	Richard Riehle, Adam Rifkin, Ray Wise, Eric Roberts, Sean Paul Lockhart, Anton Troy, Lin Shaye, Gabby West, Tim Sullivan, Joel David Moore, Kristina Klebe, Kane Hodder, A. J. Bowen	United States	
ChromeSkull: Laid to Rest 2	Robert Green Hall	Nick Principe, Thomas Dekker, Mimi Michaels, Danielle Harris, Owain Yeoman, Brian Austin Green	United States	Horror Slasher
Creature	Fred M. Andrews	Sid Haig, Mehcad Brooks, Serinda Swan, Amanda Fuller	United States	
Deadball	Yudai Yamaguchi	Tak Sakaguchi, Mari Hoshino, Miho Ninagawa	Japan	
Dear God No!	James Bickert	Jett Bryant, Madeline Brumby, Paul McComiskey	United States	
Desaparecidos	David Schürmann	Charlene Chagas, Natalia Vidal, Pedro Urizzi	Brazil	
Detention	Joseph Kahn	Josh Hutcherson, Shanley Caswell, Spencer Locke	United States	Comedy horror
The Devil's Rock	Paul Campion	Craig Hall, Matthew Sunderland, Gina Varela, Karlos Drinkwater	New Zealand	
Don't Be Afraid of the Dark	Troy Nixey	Guy Pearce, Katie Holmes, Bailee Madison	United States	
Drive Angry	Patrick Lussier	Nicolas Cage, Amber Heard, William Fichtner	United States	Supernatural horror
Dylan Dog: Dead of Night	Kevin Munroe	Brandon Routh, Anita Briem, Sam Huntington	United States	
Exit 33	Tommy Brunswick	Kane Hodder, Antoinette Kalaj, Jerry Reid	United States	
Famine	Ryan Nicholson	Des Larson, Beth Cantor, Sanya Silver, Karyn Halpin, Thabi Maphoso, Christine Wallace, Christopher Lomas, Gustavo MacSerna	Canada	
Final Destination 5	Steven Quale	Nicholas D'Agosto, Emma Bell, Miles Fisher	United States	
Fright Night	Craig Gillespie	Anton Yelchin, Colin Farrell, Toni Collette	United States	
Ghastly	Go Seok-jin	Han Eun-jung, Lee Hyeong-seok, Hyo-min	South Korea	
Grave Encounters	The Vicious Brothers	Sean Rogerson, Ben Wilkinson, Juan Riedinger	Canada; United States	
Hellgate	John Penney	Cary Elwes, William Hurt, Ploy Jindachote, Viyada Umarin, Weeratham Wichairaksakul, Paula Taylor, Chanin Goldsmith	Thailand; United States	
Hellraiser: Revelations	Victor García	Stephan Smith Collins, Tracey Fairaway, Steven Brand	United States	
Hostel: Part III	Scott Spiegel	Sarah Habel, Kip Pardue, Thomas Kretschmann	United States	
The Human Centipede 2 (Full Sequence)	Tom Six	Laurence R. Harvey, Ashlynn Yennie	United Kingdom	
Husk	Brett Simmons	Devon Graye, Wes Chatham, C. J. Thomason, Tammin Sursok, Ben Easter, Joshua Skipworth, Nick Toussaint, Mike Cornelison, Aaron Harpold, Candice Mara Rose]]	United States	
I Was a Teenage Werebear	Tim Sullivan	Sean Paul Lockhart, Anton Troy, Lin Shaye, Gabby West, Tim Sullivan	United States	
Inbred	Alex Chandon	Jo Hartley, James Doherty (actor)	United Kingdom	
The Incident	Alexandre Courtes	Rupert Evans, Kenny Doughty, Joseph Kennedy	France	
The Innkeepers	Ti West	Sara Paxton, Pat Healy, Kelly McGillis	United States	
Juan of the Dead	Alejandro Brugués	Alexis Diaz de Villegas, Jorge Molina, Andrea Duro	Spain; Cuba	
Laddaland	Sophon Sakdaphisit	Saharat Sangkapricha, Piyathida Woramusik, Athipich Chutiwatkajornchai	Thailand	
Last Screening	Laurent Achard	Pascal Cervo, Charlotte Van Kemmel, Karole Rocher	France	
Livid	Alexandre Bustillo, Julien Maury	Chloé Coulloud, Jérémy Kapone, Catherine Jacob	France	
Lobos de Arga	Juan Martinez Moreno		Spain	
Marianne	Filip Tegstedt	Peter Stormare, Thomas Hedengran, Sandra Larsson	Sweden	
Metamorphosis	Hajime Ohata	Kazunari Aizawa, Aki Morita, Teruhiko Nobukuni	Japan	
Monster Brawl	Jesse Thomas Cook	Dave Foley, Art Hindle, Robert Maillett	Canada	
Mysterious Island	Rico Chung	Jordan Chan, Mini Yang, Hiro Hayama	China	
The Orphan Killer	Matt Farnsworth	Diane Foster, David Backus, Matt Farnsworth	United States	
Panic Button	Chris Crow		United Kingdom	
Paranormal Activity 3	Henry Joost, Ariel Schulman		United States	
The Perfect House	Affandi Abdul Rachman	Cathy Sharon, Bella Esperance, Endy Arfian	Indonesia	
Quarantine 2: Terminal	John Pogue	Mercedes Masohn, Josh Cooke, Ignacio Serricchio	United States	
Red Riding Hood	Catherine Hardwicke	Amanda Seyfried, Gary Oldman, Billy Burke	United States	
Red State	Kevin Smith	Michael Angarano, Kyle Gallner, Nicholas Braun	United States	
Resurrection	Woo Ming Jin, Pierre André	Shaarnaz Ahmad, Nisha Dirr, Cut Mutia	Malaysia	
Scream 4	Wes Craven	Neve Campbell, Courteney Cox, David Arquette, Emma Roberts, Hayden Panettiere, Rory Culkin, Anthony Anderson, Marley Shelton, Nico Tortorella, Marielle Jaffe, Adam Brody, Erik Knudsen	United States	
Shark Night 3D	David R. Ellis	Sara Paxton, Dustin Milligan, Chris Carmack	United States	
Stitched	Garth Ennis		United States	
The Task	Alex Orwell	Alexandra Staden, Victor McGuire, Adam Rayner	United States	
The Thing	Matthijs van Heijningen Jr.	Mary Elizabeth Winstead, Joel Edgerton, Ulrich Thomsen	United States	
Tomie Unlimited	Noboru Iguchi	Moe Arai, Miu Nakamura, Maiko Kawakami	Japan	
Tormented	Takashi Shimizu	Hikari Mitsushima, Teruyuki Kagawa, Takeru Shibuya	Japan	
The Tunnel	Carlo Ledesma	Bel Deliá, Andy Rodoreda, Steve Davis	Australia	
Twixt	Francis Ford Coppola	Val Kilmer, Bruce Dern, Elle Fanning	United States	
The Wicker Tree	Robin Hardy	Christopher Lee, Clive Russell	United States	
White: Melody of Death	Kim Gok, Kim Sun	Hahm Eun-jung, Hwang Woo-seul-hye, May Doni Kim, Choi Ah-ra, Jin Se-yeon	South Korea	
The Woman	Lucky McKee	Sean Bridgers, Angela Bettis, Pollyanna McIntosh	United States	
Wrong Turn 4: Bloody Beginnings	Declan O'Brien	Jenny Pudavick, Tenika Davis, Kaitlyn Wong, Terra Vnesa	United States	Slasher
You're Next	Adam Wingard	Sharni Vinson, Joe Swanberg, A. J. Bowen	United States	
Zombie Ass	Noboru Iguchi		Japan	
