= Brazzaville Foundation =

London non-profit organisation

- Founded: 14 August 2014
- Founders: Jean-Yves Ollivier
- Purpose: Peace & Conservation
- Location: London, United Kingdom
- Region served: Europe and Africa
- Method: Mediation, Coordination, Awareness
- Key people: Kabiné Komara, Kgalema Motlanthe, Olusegun Obasanjo, Amama Mbabazi
- Website: www.brazzavillefoundation.org

The Brazzaville Foundation is an independent, non-profit organisation based in London. Its goal is to develop initiatives, primarily in Africa, in the fields of conflict prevention and resolution, development, the environment and conservation and to bring countries together in peaceful cooperation. It was first registered in the United Kingdom with the Charity Commission in 2015 and granted special consultative status by the UN Economic and Social Council in 2018.

== History ==
The Foundation derives its name from the Brazzaville Protocol official agreed upon on 13 December 1988 in Brazzaville, Republic of the Congo. This agreement has been considered critical in the eventual settlement of conflicts in southern Africa, guarantees for the independence of Namibia, the liberation of Nelson Mandela and negotiations leading to the dismantlement of apartheid. Jean-Yves Ollivier, a French businessman with long experience in parallel diplomacy, worked actively in persuading the key figures to meet in Brazzaville as described in the award-winning documentary “Plot for Peace”. He launched the Foundation in 2014 with the goal of maintaining “the spirit of the Brazzaville Protocol."

== Actions ==
The Foundation principal initiatives include the following:

=== Peace and Reconciliation ===
The Foundation engages in discussions for peace and reconciliation in Libya. The Foundation helped arrange a summit in Dakar on 11–13 May 2018 allowed actors from different Libyan groups to meet and to engage in preliminary dialogues. In an interview with Forbes about the summit, Jean-Yves Ollivier declared that these exchanges were “complementary to and supportive of the United Nations, the African Union and others for bringing peace and stability to the country.”

=== Sustainable Development ===
The Foundation developed the idea of a Congo Basin Blue Fund in 2015. In the aim of directing financing toward programs that promote a ‘blue economy’ in the region, emphasizing the sustainable use of river waters and the natural ecosystems of the forest, the proposal for a Congo Basin Blue Fund was formally launched at the UN Climate Change Conference COP 22, in Marrakesh in 2016. At a special meeting in the margins of COP 22, the African Union adopted it as one of Africa's priority climate change initiatives. In March 2017 at a meeting in Oyo in the Republic of the Congo, ten countries signed a Memorandum of Understanding in which they committed themselves to establishing the Blue Fund for the Congo Basin. In 2018 the United Nations Development Programme prepared a tender for a major feasibility study which will make detailed recommendations on how the Fund will operate and be financed.

The Foundation has collaborated with Stop Ivory, by encouraging African countries to commit to the Elephant Protection Initiative with an aim to putting an end to the ivory trade.

=== The fight against falsified and substandard medicines ===
The Foundation has worked to raise awareness on the topic of substandard and falsified medicines. This work has resulted in the organization of a side event at the 71st World Health Assembly in partnership with the Harvard Global Health Institute and the London School of Hygiene and Tropical Medicine on falsified medicines or medicines of inferior quality, entitled: “Medicines that lie: a deadly public health crisis”.

== Members ==
The Foundation's trustees are Jean-Yves Ollivier, Philip Prettejohn, Olivier Scutt and Nicholas Chance. Its patron is HRH Prince Michael of Kent GCVO.

The following are members of its Advisory Board:

- Dr. José Ramos-Horta, Nobel Peace Prize laureate and former President of East Timor
- Olusegun Obasanjo, former President of Nigeria
- Kgalema Motlanthe, former President of the Republic of South Africa
- Kabiné Komara, former Prime Minister of Guinea
- Amama Mbabazi, former Prime Minister of Uganda
- Pär Stenbäck, former Minister of Foreign Affairs of Finland
- Prince Philippe of Liechtenstein
- Sundeep Waslekar, President of the Strategic Foresight Group, India
- Ilmas Futehally, executive director of the Strategic Foresight Group, India
- Dr Mathews Phosa, former Hon. Treasurer of the ANC, South Africa
- Cécilia Attias, Vice President of Public Affairs at Richard Attias & Associates and former First Lady of France
