= Recife (disambiguation) =

Recife may refer to:

- Recife, a city located in Pernambuco state, Brazil
- Sport Club do Recife, a Brazilian football (soccer) club
- Arena Recife-Olinda, a sports stadium
- Augusto Recife, a Brazilian football (soccer) player
- Eduardo Recife, a Brazilian artist
- Recife Cinema Festival, a Brazilian film festival
- Recife Broad-nosed Bat, a species of bat
