= Civil society in Lusophone African countries =

Civil society is often loosely defined as independent organizations that form out of mutual interest and can act to influence the state. The degree of autonomy that civil society groups enjoy from the state reveals the extent to which the public sphere can act on its own to impact government policy, and as such is a helpful metric of democratization within a state. In Lusophone African countries, democratization (and thus autonomy for the public sphere) varies considerably across borders; in 2021, of all the member states of the African States of Portuguese Official Language (PALOP), only São Tomé and Príncipe and Cape Verde were ranked "Free" on the Global Freedom Score by Freedom House, while Guinea-Bissau and Mozambique were classified as "Partly Free" and Angola and Equatorial Guinea as "Not Free". Though variations exist, conditions for civil society organizations in these states are often influenced by a common violent past, as independence from Portugal often came as a result of liberation wars followed by civil conflict.

== Angola ==
Angola receives low marks from Freedom House for "Associational and Organizational Rights". Specifically, the dominant MPLA (Movimento Popular de Libertação de Angola/Popular Movement for the Liberation of Angola) systematically disadvantages opposition parties seeking to challenge its rule in elections, and non-governmental organizations (NGOs) that address human rights are reportedly harassed, monitored, sued, threatened, and closed. Trade unions belonging to "essential" industries (such as oil) are legally prohibited from going on strike. The foundation of the modern relationship between the Angolan state and its public sphere formed during the Angolan Civil War (1975–2002), when civil society organizations became pivotal in procuring services to the population that the state itself was unable to provide. Towards the end of the conflict, when the warring factions – MPLA and UNITA (União Nacional para a Independência Total de Angola/National Union for the Total Independence of Angola) – were engaged in peace negotiations, civil society organizations as well as NGOs were deliberately excluded from the process. As such, Angolan politics today reflects a reality in which non-state actors were not present in the nation-building process to advocate for the interests of civil society organizations, but were excluded by the main factions seeking dominance over the country. Even the Catholic Church, which is adhered to by 41% of Angolans, was shut out of the process in favor of other international mediators (such as the United States, Russia, and Portugal) during the 1990 Bicesse Accords that failed to produce peace and was violated by the MPLA and UNITA.

== Guinea-Bissau and Cape Verde ==
Following independence in 1975, Guinea-Bissau and Cape Verde were briefly linked politically by the PAIGC (Partido Africano para a Independência da Guiné e Cabo Verde/African Party for the Independence of Guinea and Cape Verde), before a Guinean military coup in 1980 produced a schism within the party, leading to the formation of the PAICV (Partido Africana da Independência do Cabo Verde/African Party for the Independence of Cape Verde). Rated as "Partly Free" by Freedom House, Guinea-Bissau does not generally respect the right of association within its borders. The government declared a state of emergency at the onset of the COVID-19 pandemic that thwarted activists' ability to organize protests. Furthermore, leaders of prominent non-governmental organizations (NGOs) have experienced harassment and even death threats, such as lawyer and human rights leader Luís Vaz Martins, who claims he was the target of an attempt on his life ordered by President Umaro Sissoco Embaló in August 2021. Martins is the former president of the LGDH (Liga Guineense dos Direitos Humanos/Guinean League of Human Rights).

Following the 1980 military coup in Guinea-Bissau, Cape Verde was governed by a one-party state led by the PAICV. During this period, civil society organizations were largely controlled by the ruling party, which defined such groups as being under its umbrella. For example, the PAICV oversaw youth groups, women's groups, and trade unions that replaced organic civil society organizations with branches that were led by the party. However, in 1990 Cape Verde transitioned to multi-party democracy, providing opportunities for independent groups to form.

== Mozambique ==
Rated as "Partly Free" by Freedom House, Mozambique reportedly allows many NGOs to operate without "legal restriction". However, civil society organizations that criticize the state and engage in election monitoring have testified that intimidation and death threats are still common. Furthermore, an insurgency in the northern province of Cabo Delgado hinders the freedom of civil society to carry out its activities without fears of violence. Similarly to Angola, non-state actors, as well as traditional and local institutions were relied upon to provide services during the Mozambican Civil War (1977–1992). One such institution was the Catholic Church, which was so pivotal that it has been credited with helping broker peace between the FRELIMO (Frente de Libertação de Moçambique/Liberation Front of Mozambique) and RENAMO (Resistência Nacional Moçambicana/National Mozambican Resistance) factions. Over two years and twelve rounds of negotiations, the Church mediated between the armed groups in Rome, producing a lasting peace in 1992 that ended the conflict. The success of the Catholic Church in Mozambique versus in Angola is due to the fact that the Mozambican bishops made less reference to democratization as an integral part of the peace process than their Angolan counterparts. Furthermore, the situation in Angola was considered a higher priority by the United States, while in Mozambique the primary external patrons for RENAMO against the Soviet-backed FRELIMO were the minority-white regimes in South Africa and South Rhodesia. This dynamic allowed a civil society organization like the Catholic Church to assert itself as a mediator in ending the conflict.

Before the civil war, the ruling FRELIMO party maintained a heavy-handed relationship between the Mozambican state and civil society organizations. Few organizations were allowed to operate independently, while most were brought under the umbrella of the FRELIMO-dominated state as "democratic mass organizations", which became highly-centralized around the party. In contemporary Mozambique, association with independent organizations takes a variety of forms. Immediately following peace talks in 2002, rates of association among Mozambicans was lacking, and reflected an inclination to trust traditional and religious groups. For example, while 5–8% of citizens reported leading or active membership in "modern" civil society organizations, 41% identified with a religious group, and two-thirds of respondents reported attending a "community meeting". And while only 44% of respondents said they would "never" be willing to attend a protest, only 14% actually did so in 2005. More recently, the 2021 Afrobarometer Report for Mozambique revealed high levels of trust in traditional and religious leaders. When registering trust in traditional leaders, 43.3% of respondents reported "a lot" of trust and 18.8% said "somewhat", while 52.7% of respondents recorded "a lot" and 17.7% reported "somewhat" trust in religious leaders. Furthermore, respondents rated traditional leaders with relatively high approval; 23.2% "strongly approve" while 46.9% "Approve" of the performance of their traditional leaders. This suggests a strong level of trust and association with civil society organizations that are not formally considered in Western surveys but hold vast sway for their informal influence at the local level.

== São Tomé and Príncipe ==
Freedom House considered São Tomé and Príncipe to be a "Free" country in its 2021 Global Freedom Score. Accordingly, the freedoms of press, assembly, and association are generally respected by the state. However, there are fears that expanded exploitation of oil resources in the region could provoke symptoms of a "resource curse". Namely, that civil liberties and autonomy for civil society organizations could erode if the government uses oil revenues to consolidate its power in a more authoritarian fashion.
