= Carpoolers (film) =

- Theatrical release poster
- Spanish: Con quién viajas
- Directed by: Martín Cuervo
- Written by: Martín Cuervo
- Produced by: Eduardo Campoy; Adolfo Blanco; Raúl Berdonés; Pablo Jimeno
- Starring: Salva Reina; Ana Polvorosa; Pol Monen; Andrea Duro
- Cinematography: Pablo Bürmann
- Edited by: Carlos Agulló
- Music by: Iván Valdés
- Production companies: Álamo Producciones; A Contracorriente Films; Neón Producciones; Álamo Audiovisual Quinta Parte AIE
- Distributed by: A Contracorriente Films
- Release dates: 5 June 2021 (Málaga); 10 September 2021 (Spain)
- Country: Spain
- Language: Spanish

Carpoolers (Spanish: Con quién viajas) is a 2021 Spanish comedy thriller road movie written and directed by Martín Cuervo which stars Salva Reina, Ana Polvorosa, Andrea Duro, and Pol Monen.

== Plot ==
Upon starting a trip from Madrid to Cieza using a car-sharing app, the three passengers (Elisa, Miguel, and Ana) become suspicious of the real intentions of Julián, the creepy driver, driving them increasingly nervous.

== Cast ==
- Salva Reina as Julián
- Ana Polvorosa as Elisa
- Pol Monen as Miguel
- Andrea Duro as Ana

== Production ==
The film is an Álamo Producciones Audiovisuales, Neón Producciones, Álamo Audiovisual Quinta Parte AIE, and A Contracorriente Films production, with the participation of 7RM. The production used the Unreal Engine 4 technology.

== Reception ==
The film was presented at the 24th Málaga Film Festival on 5 June 2021. Distributed by A Contracorriente Films, it was released theatrically in Spain on 10 September 2021.

== Reception ==
Juan Pando of Fotogramas rated the film 4 out of 5 stars, pointing out that productions like the film "show that you do not need big budgets to make good films, talent is enough".

Javier Cortijo of Cinemanía rated the film 2½ out of 5 stars, writing about a "promising starter that runs out of gas early".

== See also ==
- List of Spanish films of 2021
