= Desaparecidos (disambiguation) =

Desaparecidos is a Spanish term for the victims of the crime of enforced disappearance.

Desaparecidos may also refer to:

- Desaparecidos del franquismo, forced disappearances during and after the Spanish Civil War
- Extrajudicial killings and forced disappearances in the Philippines § Desaparecidos
- Desaparecidos (band), an American rock band
- Desaparecidos (film), a 2011 Brazilian film
- Desaparecidos (American TV series)
- Desaparecidos (Spanish TV series)

== See also ==
- Desaparecido (disambiguation)
