= Brazzaville (disambiguation) =

Brazzaville is the capital of the Republic of the Congo.

It may also refer to:

- Brazzaville (band)
- Brazzaville Conference of 1944
- CARA Brazzaville, a Congolese football club based in Brazzaville
- Brazzaville Protocol
- An unproduced sequel to the 1942 film Casablanca
