= Plot for Peace =

Plot For Peace
- Directed by: Carlos Agulló; Mandy Jacobson
- Produced by: Mandy Jacobson; Executive: Ivor Ichikowitz
- Cinematography: Rita Noriega; Diego Ollivier
- Edited by: Carlos Agulló
- Music by: Antony Partos
- Distributed by: Rezo Films (France); Caramel Films (Spain); Trinity Film (UK); Annie Planet (Japan); Indelible Media (South Africa)
- Release dates: 20 October 2013 (France); 5 December 2013 (Spain); 14 March 2014 (UK); 5 August 2014 (South Africa); 31 October 2014 (USA)
- Running time: 84 minutes
- Country: South Africa
- Languages: English, French, Portuguese, Afrikaans & Spanish

Plot For Peace is a 2013 South African documentary directed by Carlos Agulló and Mandy Jacobson.

The film tells the story of Algerian-born French businessman Jean-Yves Ollivier's involvement in Cold War-era African parallel diplomacy, the signing of the 1988 Brazzaville Protocol and discussions surrounding the eventual release of Nelson Mandela. Using archive footage from apartheid-era South Africa alongside interviews from Winnie Mandela, Thabo Mbeki, Denis Sassou-Nguesso and Mathews Phosa, Ollivier (previously unknown and referred to as 'Monsieur Jacques') is revealed as a key architect of the withdrawal of Cuban troops from Angola and a 1987 prisoner-exchange programme involving six African nations.

== Plot ==
The film follows the role of Jean-Yves Ollivier, a prominent French businessman, in negotiating the end of the South African Border War and subsequently, the transition to multiracial democracy in South Africa.

== Awards ==
Festival	Country	Award
FICiP Argentina Festival Internacional de Cine Político	Argentina	First Mention in the International Feature Official Competition (2014)
Festival Regards sur le cinéma du monde de Rouen	France	Jury Award for Best Documentary
Palm Springs International Film Festival	United States	Special Jury Award
São Paulo International Film Festival	Brazil	Jury Award for Best Documentary
São Paulo International Film Festival	Brazil	Audience Award for Best Documentary
Hamptons International Film Festival	United States	Conflict and Resolution Award
Galway Film Fleadh	Ireland	Best International Feature Documentary
