= My Penguin Friend =

- Theatrical release poster
- Directed by: David Schurmann
- Written by: Paulina Lagudi Ulrich; Kristen Lazarian
- Produced by: Shaked Berenson; Patrick Ewald; Robin Jonas; Jonathan Lim; Nicolas Veinberg; Steven P. Wegner; Andreas Wentz
- Starring: Jean Reno; Adriana Barraza
- Cinematography: Anthony Dod Mantle
- Edited by: Teresa Font
- Music by: Fernando Velázquez
- Production companies: City Hill Arts; Content Studios
- Distributed by: Roadside Attractions
- Release date: August 16, 2024
- Running time: 97 minutes
- Country: United States
- Language: English
- Box office: $5 million

My Penguin Friend is a 2024 biographical adventure film directed by David Schurmann, written by Paulina Lagudi Ulrich and Kristen Lazarian, and starring Jean Reno and Adriana Barraza. It is based on the true story of fisherman João Pereira de Souza and Dindim the penguin, which went viral in 2016. It was first released in France on August 7, 2024, and was released in the United States on August 16, 2024. The film received positive reviews from critics.

== Premise ==
Brazilian Fisherman João Pereira de Souza discovers an injured penguin drifting alone in the ocean, near death and covered in oil from a spill. João rescues the animal and rehabilitates it, forging an unconventional lifelong friendship.

== Cast ==
- Jean Reno as João Pereira de Souza
- Adriana Barraza as Maria
- Ravel Cabral as Paulo
- Rocío Hernández as Stephanie
- Nicolás Francella as Carlos
- Alexia Moyano as Adriana
- Thalma de Freitas as Calista
- Pedro Urizzi as young João

== Production ==
On April 19, 2022, it was reported that Jonathan Lim had launched the American production company City Hill Arts, and that their first film would be The Penguin & the Fisherman, to be directed by David Schurmann and starring Jean Reno. The film was later retitled My Penguin Friend. On October 14, 2022, it was reported that Adriana Barraza had joined the cast, as João's wife Maria.

My Penguin Friend was filmed primarily on the tropical beaches of Brazil and amongst a colony of nearly a million penguins in Patagonia, Argentina. Production wrapped in February 2023, and post production took place in Madrid, Spain.

The film was produced by Jonathan Lim, Robin Jonas, Steven P. Wegner, Andreas Wentz, Nicolas Veinberg, Shaked Berenson, and Patrick Ewald. On February 15, 2024, it was announced that US distribution rights had been acquired by Roadside Attractions.

== Release ==
The film was released in the United States on August 16, 2024.

== Reception ==
=== Box office ===
In the United States and Canada, the film made $1 million from 1,083 theaters in its opening weekend.

=== Critical response ===
On the review aggregator website Rotten Tomatoes, 85% of 55 critics' reviews are positive, with an average rating of 6.8/10. The website's consensus reads: "Pairing the ever-reliable Jean Reno with a scene-stealing feathered co-star to winning effect, My Penguin Friend mostly coasts by on charm -- which is not in short supply." Metacritic, which uses a weighted average, assigned the film a score of 70 out of 100, based on 8 critics, indicating "generally favorable" reviews.

Christy Lemire of RogerEbert.com gave the film three out of four stars and wrote, "There's something radical about the old-fashioned approach of My Penguin Friend. It's an earnest, crowd-pleasing family film – nothing snarky or self-referential, no on-the-nose needle drops - just a sweet, beautifully made movie that earns the emotion it'll surely draw from its viewers."
