= Carlos Agulló =

Spanish film director and editor awarded

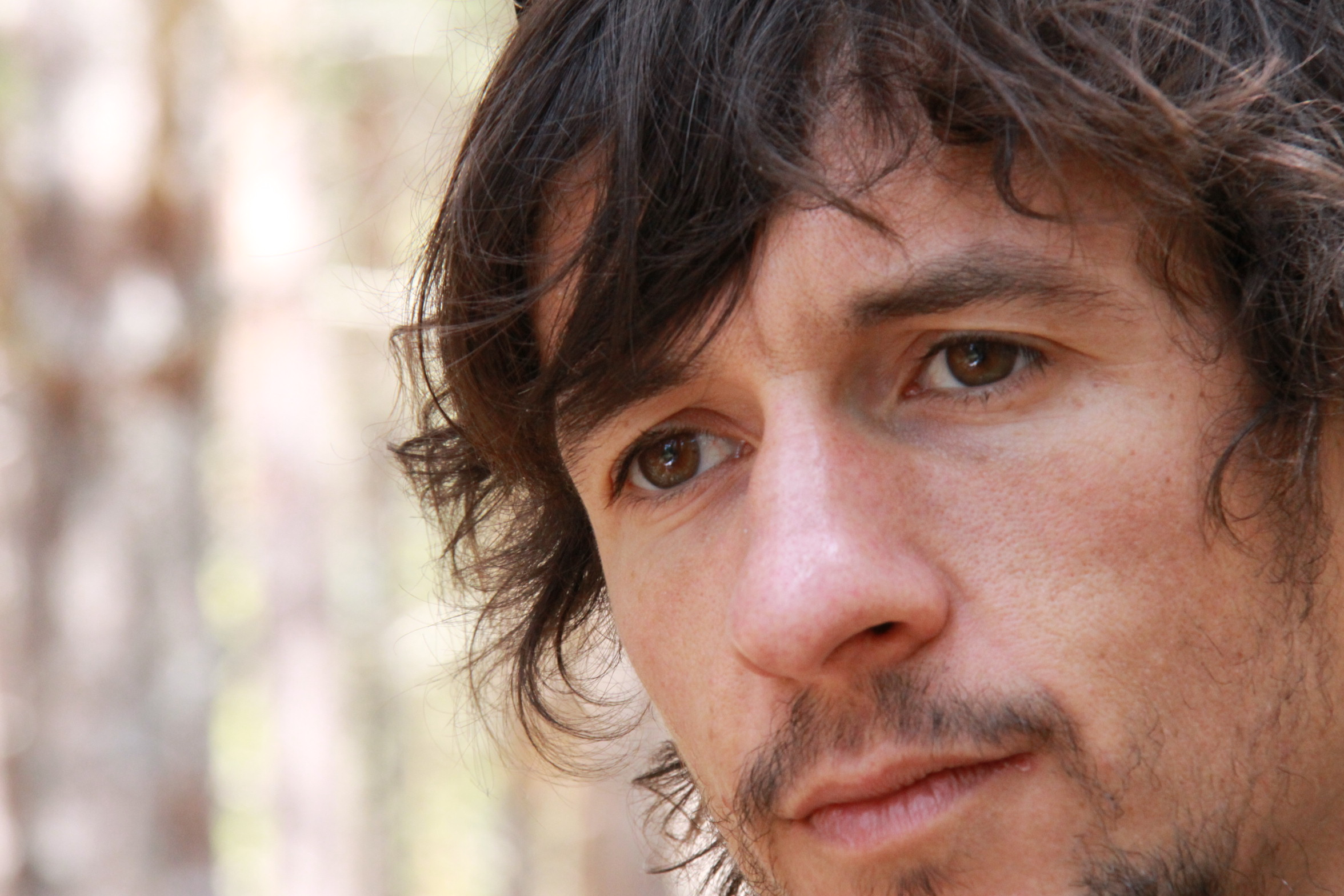
- Born: Carlos F. Agulló; December 9, 1974 (age 51); Madrid, Spain
- Occupations: Film director, film editor
- Website: IMDb profile

Carlos Agulló (born December 9, 1974) is a Spanish Film Director and Film Editor awarded in numerous festivals, such as the Palm Springs International Film Festival, the São Paulo International Film Festival and the Hamptons International Film Festival.

== Film career ==
After graduating in Fine Arts from the Complutense University of Madrid, he started out as an editor's assistant to such well known editors as Iván Aledo. His collaboration with Alejandro Amenábar on the Oscar-winning film The Sea Inside launched his career as a film editor, later working with other directors such as Mateo Gil, Oskar Santos, Paco Caballero, Diego Betancor, Jorge Blanco, Roberto Bueso, Hugo Martín Cuervo and Jorge Sánchez-Cabezudo.

Parallel to his activity as Film Editor, he directed five short films until making his debut in feature-length directing with the multi-awarded South African documentary Plot for Peace. As a Director he has approached sensitive topics such as hospice care on his feature documentary All The Other Days or the March 2004 Madrid train bombings on his Amazon Prime Video series The Challenge:11M. He has recently directed true crime documentary series for Netflix, such as The Rosa Peral Tapes or Angi: Fake Life, True Crime.

== Awards ==
| Festival | Country | Award | Film title |
|---|---|---|---|
| Premis de l'Audiovisual Valencià | Spain | Best Editing and Postproduction | Love Beats |
| CMS International Children's Film Festival | India | Best Documentary Short | More than Silver |
| Concurso de cortometrajes CREASPORT | Spain | Best Original Soundtrack | More than Silver |
| Concurso de cortometrajes CREASPORT | Spain | Best Cinematography | More than Silver |
| 5th Zero Plus International Film Festival of Films for Children and Youth | Russia | Special Award | More than Silver |
| FICIP | Argentina | First Mention in the International Features Official Competition | Plot For Peace |
| Regards sur le Cinema du Monde (Rouen) | France | Jury Award for Best Documentary | Plot For Peace |
| Palm Springs International Film Festival | US | Special Jury Award | Plot For Peace |
| Sao Paulo International Film Festival | Brazil | Jury Award for Best Documentary | Plot For Peace |
| Sao Paulo International Film Festival | Brazil | Audience Award for Best Documentary | Plot For Peace |
| Hamptons International Film Festival | US | Conflict and Resolution Award | Plot For Peace |
| Galway Film Fleadh | Ireland | Best International Feature Documentary | Plot For Peace |
| Rincón International Film Festival | Puerto Rico | Excellence Award | Next Station |
| Hayah International Shortfilm Festival | Panama | Best Foreign Script | Next Station |
| Notodofilmfest | Spain | Freak Distribution Award | Next Station |
| VII Cicle de Curtmetratges Agustí Comes | Spain | Jury Award | The Wait |
| Festicurts IV (Figueres) | Spain | Tomás Mallol Award | The Wait |

== Filmography ==
Director
| 2025 | Angi: Fake Life, True Crime |
| 2023 | The Rosa Peral Tapes |
| 2022 | The Challenge: 11M |
| 2018 | Daughters of al-Shabab |
| 2018 | More than Silver |
| 2017 | All The Other Days |
| 2013 | Plot For Peace |
| 2011 | Next Station |
| 2008 | Pizza Eli |
| 2008 | Ana Chronia |
| 2008 | The Wait |
| 2006 | The Gift |

Second Unit Director
| Year | Title | Director |
|---|---|---|
| 2021 | La Fortuna | Alejandro Amenábar |
| 2018 | Six Dreams | Justin Webster |

Editor
| Year | Title | Director |
|---|---|---|
| 2023 | Killing the President | Eulogio Romero |
| 2022 | My Happy Place | Mabel del Pozo |
| 2022 | The Challenge: 11M | Carlos Agulló |
| 2021 | Carpoolers | Hugo Martín Cuervo |
| 2019 | Love Beats | Roberto Bueso |
| 2018 | More than Silver | Carlos Agulló |
| 2017 | All The Other Days | Carlos Agulló |
| 2014 | Miss Brackets, the Baby-sitter, the Bastard Grandson And Emma Suárez | Sergio Candel |
| 2013 | Plot For Peace | Carlos Agulló y Mandy Jacobson |
| 2011 | Crematorium | Jorge Sánchez-Cabezudo |
| 2011 | Next Station | Carlos Agulló |
| 2010 | Hands | Jon Sagalá |
| 2010 | Fernanda | Sergio Candel |
| 2010 | Sincerity | Paco Caballero |
| 2010 | Historia de un Director Idiota | Sergio Candel |
| 2010 | Cama Blanca | Diego Betancor |
| 2010 | For The Good Of Others | Oskar Santos |
| 2009 | Together | Gigi Romero |
| 2009 | Planet 51 | Jorge Blanco |
| 2008 | Pizza Eli | Carlos Agulló |
| 2008 | Bienes Comunes | Paco Caballero |
| 2008 | Ana Chronia | Carlos Agulló |
| 2008 | The Wait | Carlos Agulló |
| 2007 | Strike 2 | Arturo Prins |
| 2007 | Test | Marta Aledo y Natalia Mateo |
| 2006 | Back to Moira | Mateo Gil |
| 2006 | The Gift | Carlos Agulló |
| 2005 | Un Viaje Mar Adentro | Oskar Santos |
| 2004 | Aloe | Sergio Delgado |
| 2003 | Flores Para Maika | Andreu Castro |
