= Alexia Moyano =

Argentine actress

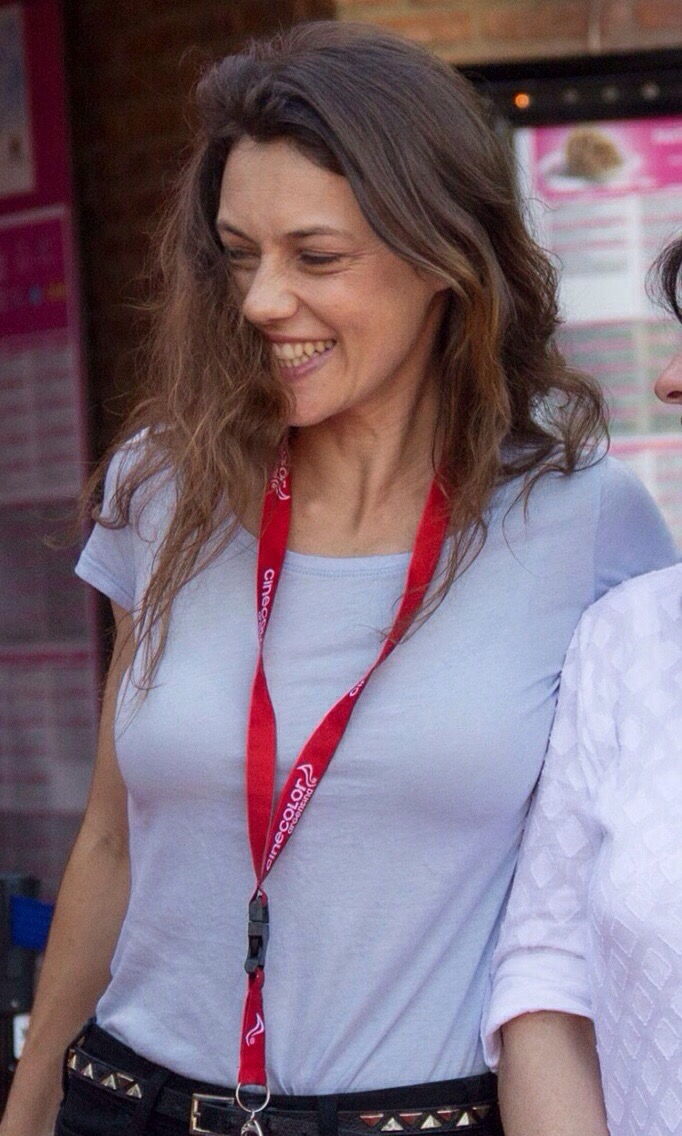
- Moyano at the 2015 Festival Pantalla Pinamar
- Born: Alexia Betiana Moyano; 15 February 1982 (age 44); Comandante Luis Piedrabuena, Argentina
- Occupation: Actress
- Years active: 2007–present

Alexia Betiana Moyano (born 15 February 1982) is an Argentine actress.

== Early life and education ==
Born in Comandante Luis Piedrabuena, province of Santa Cruz, Argentina, Moyano lived there until she was 16 years old. In 1998 she moved to Buenos Aires and attended the University of Buenos Aires where she began her interest in theatre, training with Virginia Lago.

Her first theatre role was Maria Josefa in a school production of The House of Bernarda Alba, directed by Sebastian Kalhat and Marcela Bidegain. In 2005 she graduated with honors from the University of Buenos Aires with a Bachelor's in Business Administration. By the time she graduated she had dedicated her life to acting, and continued her training with Helena Tritek. From 2009 to 2010 Moyano earned a postgraduate diploma in classical acting from LAMDA and trained with Complicité in Commedia dell'arte with Marcello Magni. Fluent in French, from 2012 to 2013 she studied at the Conservatoire national supérieur d'art dramatique.

== Career ==
Moyano works extensively internationally in theatre, feature films, and television in Spanish, English, and French. She co-starred as Pilar in Filosofia de vida, directed by Javier Daulte and starring Alfredo Alcón, Claudia Lapacó, Rodolfo Bebán, and Marco Antonio Caponi. For her work in Filosofia de vida, she was nominated for the Premios ACE Award for Revelation Actress. In 2014 Moyano acted at the Teatro Nacional Cervantes in Bisnietas, directed by Julia Calvo.

In film, she appeared in Verdades verdaderas (2011, directed by Nicolás Gil Lavedra), Extraños en la noche (2012, directed by Alejandro Montiel) La cacería (2012, directed by Carlos Orgambide), and Tiempos menos modernos (2012, directed by Simon Franco). In 2015 she starred in The Irish Prisoner (original title: El prisionero irlandés), directed by Carlos Juareguialzo and Marcelo Silva y Nasute. That same year, Moyano made her English-speaking film debut in Colonia, with further English credits as the mother of Luis Palau in Palau the Movie (2019), and as the marine geologist Adriana in My Penguin Friend (2024).

In television, Moyano's appearances include the miniseries Babylon, Signos, Milagros en Campaña, Supermax, Monzón: A Knockout Blow, El reino, and Limbo.

== Filmography ==
=== Film ===
Year	Title	Role	Ref.
2024	My Penguin Friend	Adriana	
2022	El último zombi	Laura	
2021	10 Palomas	Mariana	
2020	Devoto, la invasión silenciosa	Sargento Gutierrez	
2019	Palau the Movie	Matilde	
2015	Colonia	Flight Attendant	
2015	The Irish Prisoner (original title: El prisionero irlandés)	Luisa	
2012	Extraños en la noche	Mechi	
2012	La cacería	Lara Kreimer	
2012	Tiempos menos modernos	Alma	
2012	Grey Wolf: Hitler's Escape to Argentina	Araceli	
2011	Verdades verdaderas	Exiliada	

=== Television ===
Year	Title	Role	Notes	Ref.
2022	Limbo	Delfina	Recurring role	
2021	El reino	Linda	Recurring role	
2019	Monzón: A Knockout Blow	Luz	Supporting role	
2017	Supermax	Anette Gijón	Supporting role	
2015	Milagros en Campaña	Anabella	Series regular	
2015	Signos	Isabel	Recurring role	
2012	Babylon	Pucca	13 episodes	

=== Theatre ===
Year	Title	Role	Venue	Ref.
2015	Agatha	Agatha	Alliance Française de Buenos Aires	
2015	Bisnietas	Sara	Teatro Nacional Cervantes	
2012	Filosofia de vida	Pilar	Metropolitan II	
2008	Cremona	La Griega	Teatro Nacional Cervantes	
2008	Cielo rojo	Anastasia	Patio de Actores	
2008	Un guapo del 900	Edelmira	Gira por la Provincia de Buenos Aires	
2008	La niña y el leñador	La niña	La Ratonera Cultural	
2007	Crónicas	Rubia	Mantis Club	

== Awards and nominations ==
Year	Award	Work	Result	Ref.
2012	Premios Ace Award for Revelation Actress	Filosofia de vida	Nominated	
