= Desaparecido =

Desaparecido is a Spanish word that means disappeared. It may refer to:

- A person who is abducted by a state or political organization, followed by a refusal to acknowledge the person's fate and whereabouts; see Forced disappearance
- Desaparecido (album), a 1985 album by Italian rock band Litfiba
- "Desaparecido", a Manu Chao song on the 1998 Clandestino album

== See also ==
- Desaparecidos (disambiguation)
- Desaparecida
