= Meeting MacGuffin =

- Directed by: Catya Plate
- Written by: Catya Plate
- Produced by: Catya Plate; Todd Aven
- Starring: Richard Steven Horvitz; Misty Lee
- Cinematography: Catya Plate
- Edited by: Todd Aven
- Music by: Zac Zinger
- Animation by: Catya Plate
- Release date: February 2, 2017
- Running time: 9 minutes 58
- Country: United States
- Language: English

Meeting MacGuffin is a stop-motion animated short film written, directed and animated by Catya Plate. The film screened at the Academy Awards qualifying HollyShorts Film Festival and Rhode Island International Film Festival, where it won the Grand Prize:Best Animated Short Film in Vortex Edition. It is the sequel of Hanging By A Thread and second in a trilogy of animated shorts.

== Plot ==
In the post-apocalyptic future where humanity is no more, a group of scientists and an animated sign complete the construction of a new human race. They meet a groundhog climatologist with expertise in water renewal who prepares the Homeys for their mission to restore balance to a decimated Earth.

== Voice cast ==
- Richard Steven Horvitz as Gormal MacGuffin
- Misty Lee as LF
- John McBride as Hitch

== Reception ==
=== Critical response ===
A four star review about Meeting MacGuffin in 22nd Indiestreet.com states that "Stop motion animation is not a new thing. Quite the opposite. It's the designs of these characters and the world itself, that is really something special.", Indie Shorts Mag says that "‘Meeting MacGuffin’ Is The Best Stop-Motion, Ecological Thriller Out There!".

=== Accolades ===
Year	Award	Category	Result
2019	Black Maria Film and Video Festival	Jury's Citation Award	Won
2018	Fano International Film Festival	Special Jury Mention	Won
2018	Blowup Film Fest	Best Animation	Nominated
2018	St. Francis College Women's Film Festival	Best Animated Short	Won
2018	Scandinavian International Film Festival	Best Animated Short	Won
2018	Wasteland Film festival	Best Animated Film	Won
2018	FilmQuest	Best Animated Film	Nominated
2017	Indie Fest	Best Animated Film	Won
2017	Rhode Island International Film Festival	Best Animated Short Film	Won
2017	Other Worlds Austin	Best Short Production Design	Won
2017	Seattle's True Independent Film Festival	Best Animated Film	Won
