= Promesas de arena =

- Genre: Adventure; Romance
- Based on: Promesas de arena by Laura Garzón
- Written by: Ignasi Rubio; Guadalupe Rilova
- Directed by: Joaquín Llamas; Manuel Estudillo
- Starring: Andrea Duro; Daniel Grao; Blanca Portillo; Francesco Arca
- Composer: Pablo Cervantes
- Country of origin: Spain
- Original language: Spanish
- No. of seasons: 1
- No. of episodes: 6

Production
- Production companies: RTVE; Atlantia Media

Original release
- Network: La 1
- Release: 11 November – 16 December 2019

Promesas de arena (lit. 'Sand Promises') is a Spanish limited television series starring Andrea Duro, Daniel Grao, Blanca Portillo and Francesco Arca. Produced by RTVE in collaboration with Atlantia Media, the adventure and romance television series is based on the namesake novel by Laura Garzón. It originally aired in 2019 on La 1.

== Premise ==
Featuring the world of international aid as backdrop, the plot of the series begins with Lucía travelling to a hospital managed by the fictional NGO 'Acción Global' located in the Libyan desert which is led by Andy (Daniel Grao) and Julia (Blanca Portillo). A love story develops between Lucía and Hayzam (Francesco Arca), the man responsible for providing the supplies to the hospital yet also living a double life as weapon trafficker.

The series is set in the fictional Libyan city of Fursa.

== Cast ==
- Andrea Duro as Lucía
- Daniel Grao as Andy
- Francesco Arca as Hayzam
- Blanca Portillo as Julia
- Marcel Borràs as Jaime
- Thaïs Blume as Berta
- Jairo Sánchez as Diego

== Production and release ==
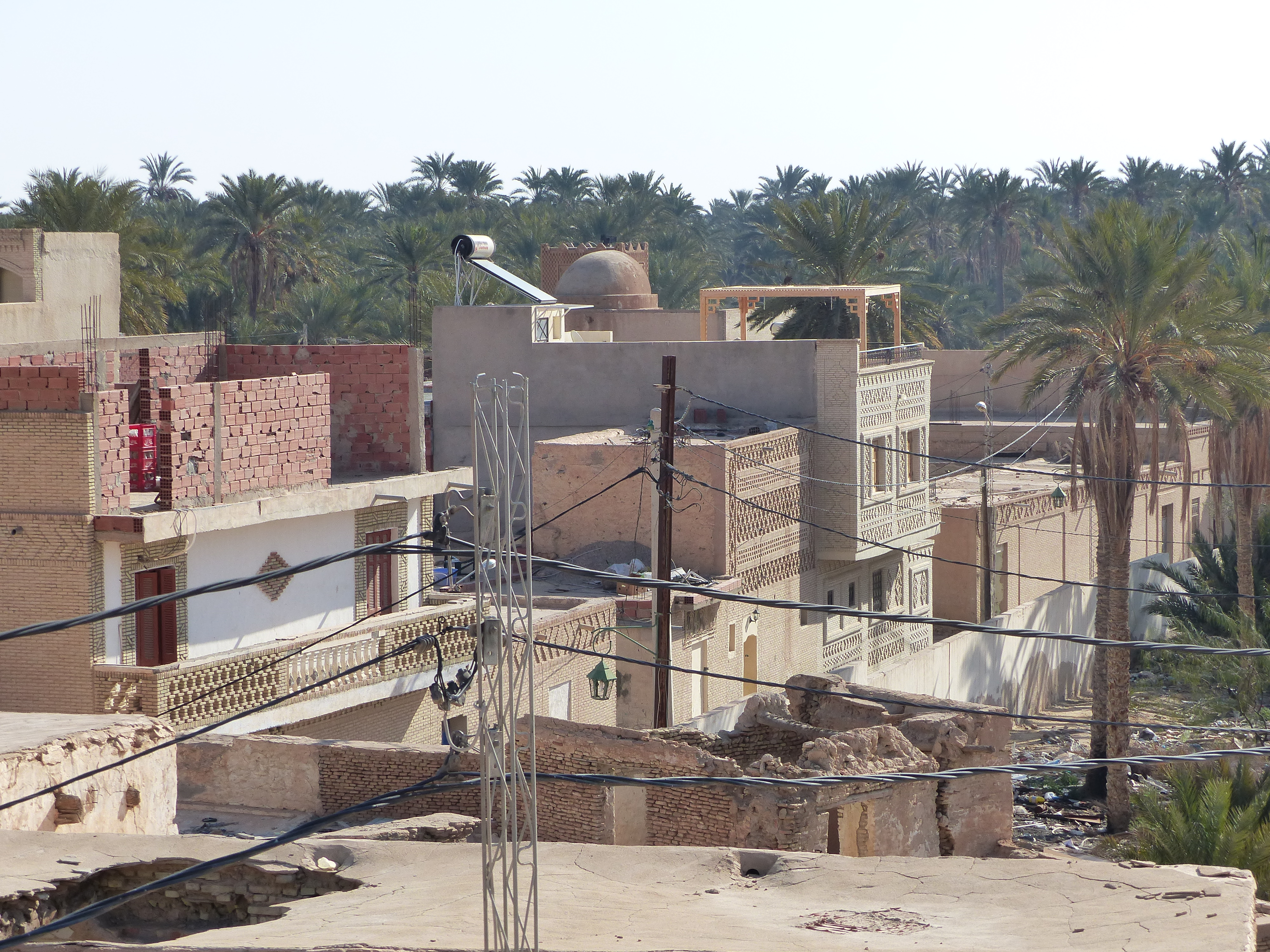
Tozeur, Tunisia, was a shooting location.

Based on the namesake novel by Laura Garzón, Promesas de arena was produced by RTVE in collaboration with Atlantia Media. The 3-month-long filming took place in Tunisia and Spain; scenes were shot in the Sfax harbour and the Tozeur oasis, whereas the rest of the filming took place in Madrid. It consisted of six episodes.

The script is authored by Ignasi Rubio and Guadalupe Rilova, based on the plot by Laura Garzón and Ignasi Rubio. Joaquín Llamas and Manuel Estudillo directed the series.

The original musical score is a work by Pablo Cervantes.

The first episode began airing on 11 November 2019 in prime time on La 1, TVE's flagship channel, attracting 1,585,000 viewers (10.5% share). The viewership remained stable albeit unimpressive throughout the broadcasting run.

Series	Episodes	Originally released			Ref.
Series	Episodes	First released	Last released	Network	Ref.
1	6	11 November 2019	16 December 2019	tve	

This is a caption
No. in season	Title	Viewers	Original release date	Share (%)
1	"El código de las dunas"	1,585,000	11 November 2019	10.5
2	"La ruta del halcón"	1,471,000	18 November 2019	9.5
3	"Oasis de vida y muerte"	1,438,000	25 November 2019	9.9
4	"La soledad del viento"	1,402,000	2 December 2019	9.5
5	"Amar sin haber amado"	1,474,000	9 December 2019	10.1
6	"La última piedra del desierto"	1,416,000	16 December 2019	9.4

== Awards and nominations ==
Year	Award	Category	Nominee(s)	Result	Ref.
2021	22nd Iris Awards	Best Fiction		Nominated	
2021	22nd Iris Awards	Best Actress	Blanca Portillo	Nominated	
