= Monzón: A Knockout Blow =

2019 Spanish-language television mini-series

- Genre: Drama
- Created by: Pablo E. Bossi
- Starring: Carla Quevedo; Mariano Chiesa; Paloma Ker
- Country of origin: Argentina
- Original language: Spanish
- No. of seasons: 1
- No. of episodes: 13

Production
- Running time: 44 min.
- Production companies: Pampa Films; Buena Vista Original Productions Latin America; INCAA

Original release
- Network: Space; Telefe; Netflix
- Release: June 17, 2019

Monzón: A Knockout Blow (Monzón) is 2019 Spanish-language mini-series starring Carla Quevedo, Mariano Chiesa and Paloma Ker.

== Cast ==
- Carla Quevedo as Alicia Muñiz
- Mariano Chiesa as Tito Lectoure
- Paloma Ker as Pelusa
- Belén Chavanne as Leticia
- Rodrigo Pedreira as Vargas Rissi
- Cumelen Sanz as Silvia Monzón
- Fabián Arenillas as Amílcar Brusa
- Nacho Gadano as El Turco
- Lautaro Delgado as Nicolino
- Andres Gil as Nino
- Yayo Guridi as El Flaco Herminda
- Pedro Merlo as Bocha
- Alexia Moyano as Luz
- Jean Pierre Noher as Gordo Caño
- Martín Seefeld as El Negro
- Pablo Sorensen as Gordillo
- Diego Starosta as Gentile
- Mex Urtizberea as Pichon
- Atilio Veronelli as Zorro
- Fabian Wolfrom as Alain Delon

== Release ==
Monzón: A Knockout Blow was released on June 17, 2019.
