= Notes for My Son =

2020 film

- Film poster
- Spanish: El Cuaderno de Tomy
- Directed by: Carlos Sorin
- Starring: Mónica Antonópulos; Paola Barrientos; Valeria Bertuccelli
- Production company: Pampa Films
- Release date: 24 November 2020
- Running time: 84 minutes
- Country: Argentina
- Language: Spanish

Notes for My Son (Spanish: El Cuaderno de Tomy) is a 2020 Argentine drama film directed by Carlos Sorin and starring Mónica Antonópulos, Paola Barrientos and Valeria Bertuccelli. Bertuccelli plays the terminal cancer mother who keeps a notebook of advice for her young son.

== Plot summary ==
A woman with terminal cancer decides to keep a notebook full of musings on life and love for her toddler son to read after she dies.

== Cast ==
- Valeria Bertuccelli as María "Marie" Vázquez
- Esteban Lamothe as Federico Corona
- Julian Sorin as Tomás "Tomy" Corona
- Mauricio Dayub as Dr. Diego Vigna
- Malena Pichot as Maru
- Catarina Spinetta as Vera
- Carla Quevedo as Joy
- Anita Pauls as Agustina
- Mónica Antonópulos as Brenda
- Paola Barrientos as Paula
- Ana Katz as Roxi
- Romini Richi as Leticia
- Diego Gentile as Charlie
- Diego Reinhold as Hernán
- Beatriz Spelzini as Dra Silvia Molina
