= By a Thread =

By a Thread, Hanging By a Thread, or variants may refer to:

- Hanging by a Thread (1979 film), American television disaster film
- Sister Street Fighter: Hanging by a Thread, 1974 Japanese martial arts film
- Hanging by a Thread, a 2013 film by Catya Plate
- By a Thread (Gov't Mule album), 2009 album by American rock band Gov't Mule
- By a Thread: Live in London 2011, 2012 album by the Devin Townsend Project
- By a Thread (John Ellis album), 2006 album by American saxophonist John Ellis
- Hanging On by a Thread, 2010 album by American Christian rock band The Letter Black
