= Little Secret (film) =

2016 film directed by David Schurmann

- Film poster
- Directed by: David Schurmann
- Written by: David Schurmann; Victor Atherino; Marcos Bernstein
- Produced by: David Schurmann; João Roni; Vilfredo Schurmann
- Starring: Marcello Antony; Júlia Lemmertz; Mariana Goulart; Maria Flor; Erroll Shand; Fionnula Flanagan
- Cinematography: Inti Briones
- Edited by: Gustavo Giani
- Music by: Antônio Pinto
- Release date: 22 October 2016 (Brazil)
- Countries: Brazil; New Zealand
- Languages: Portuguese; English
- Box office: $265,028

Little Secret (Portuguese: Pequeno Segredo) is a 2016 drama film directed by David Schurmann. The film was inspired by a true story involving Schurmann's adopted sister. It was released in Brazil in November 2016. It was selected as the Brazilian entry for the Best Foreign Language Film at the 89th Academy Awards, but it was not nominated.

== Cast ==
- Marcello Antony as Vilfredo Schurmann
- Júlia Lemmertz as Heloisa Schurmann
- Mariana Goulart as Kat Schurmann
- Maria Flor as Jeanne
- Erroll Shand as Robert
- Fionnula Flanagan as Bárbara

== Reception and Controversies ==
A number of controversies were raised over the film, including the nonselection of Aquarius (film) as the Brazilian's entry to the Best Foreign Language Film at the 89th Academy Awards by the Ministry of Culture’s committee.

Critic Alcino Leite Neto, writing for Folha de S.Paulo, heavily criticized the film, calling it "one of the worst of the recent Brazilian films" and "an ocean of clichés and sentimentality".

Conversely, critic Luciano Trigo, writing for G1, praised the film saying that "Little Secret is indeed the best Brazilian film in the last few years. In style, form and content, it is fully accredited to compete and win the Oscar for Best Foreign Film".

== See also ==
- List of submissions to the 89th Academy Awards for Best Foreign Language Film
- List of Brazilian submissions for the Academy Award for Best Foreign Language Film
