= Carla Quevedo =

Argentine actress (born 1988)

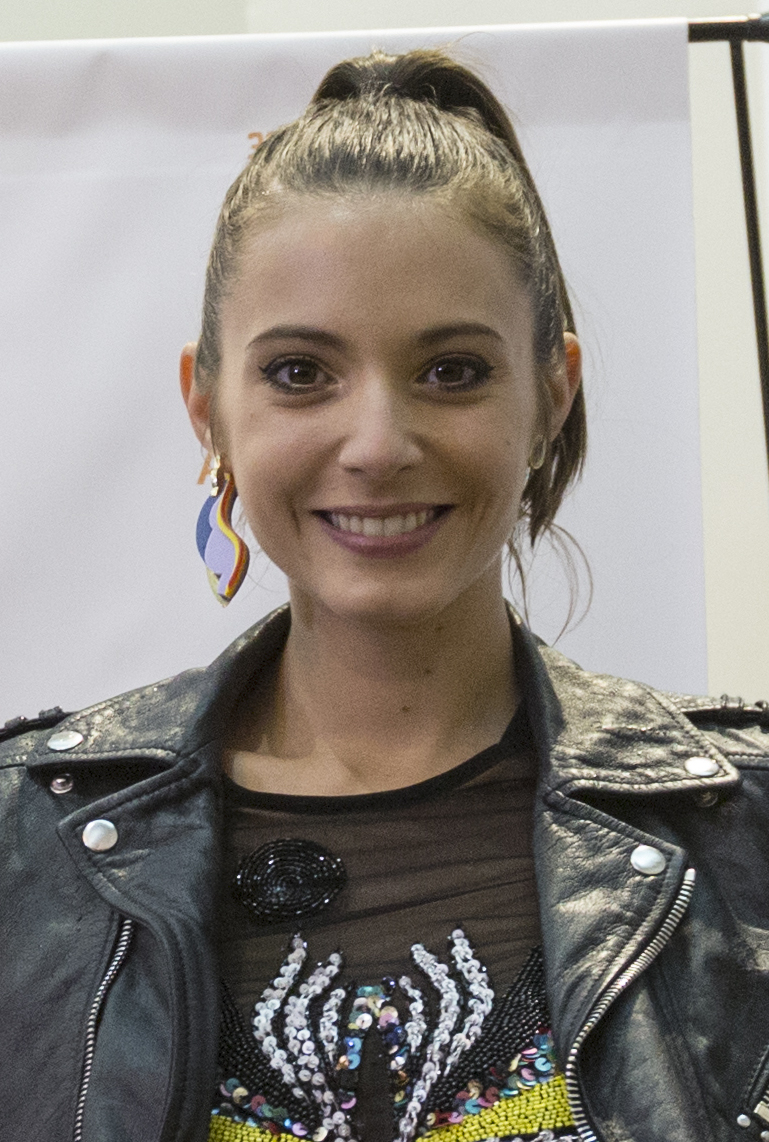
- Born: 23 April 1988 (age 38); Buenos Aires, Argentina
- Occupation: Actress
- Years active: 2009 — Present

Carla Quevedo (born 23 April 1988) is an Argentine actress. Her breakthrough came with a supporting role in the classic film The Secret in Their Eyes, in which she played Liliana Coloto.

== Career ==
Her acting debut was in the year 2009 in Argentina film directed by Juan José Campanella, The Secret in Their Eyes, winner of the Academy Award for Best Foreign Language Film. It also stars Ricardo Darín, Soledad Villamil, Pablo Rago, and Guillermo Francella. In the film, Quevedo plays Liliana Coloto a murdered girl around which the story centers. She currently is a designer for the La Belle Rebelle swimsuit line and lives in both New York City and Buenos Aires.

== Filmography ==
=== Film ===
| Year | Title | Role | Notes |
|---|---|---|---|
| 2009 | The Secret in Their Eyes | Liliana Coloto | |
| 2012 | Terminations | Helena | Short film |
| 2012 | Side Effects | Alena | Short film |
| 2012 | April in New York | Valeria | |
| 2013 | Errata | Modelo | |
| 2013 | 20.000 besos | Luciana | |
| 2014 | Affluenza | Gail | |
| 2014 | Bohemia | Bohemia | |
| 2015 | Pasaje de vida | Diana | |
| 2016 | How to Be Single | Camille | |
| 2016 | Youth in Oregon | Gilda | |
| 2020 | Notes for My Son | Joy | |

=== Television ===
| Year | Title | Role | Notes |
|---|---|---|---|
| 2013–2014 | Farsantes | Valeria Del Valle | Series Regular |
| 2014 | Las 13 esposas de Wilson Fernández | Carolina | |
| 2015 | Show Me a Hero | Nay Noe | TV miniseries 6 episodes |
| 2017 | El Hipnotizador | Abril | 8 episodes |
| 2017 | El Maestro | Luisa Galarza | TV miniseries 13 episodes |
| 2019 | Monzón: A Knockout Blow | Alicia Muñiz | Netflix miniseries 3 episodes |
| 2022 | Yosi, the Regretful Spy | Eli | Main role |

== Theatre ==
| Year | Title | Role | Notes |
|---|---|---|---|
| 2013 | Parque Lezama | Laura | Lyceum Theatre, Buenos Aires |

== Accolades ==
In 2013, Quevedo won the Best Actress Award at the HollyShorts Film Festival in Los Angeles and was nominated by the Academia Argentina de Letras for the Cóndor de Plata for Best New Actress.
