= Catya Plate =

American filmmaker and artist

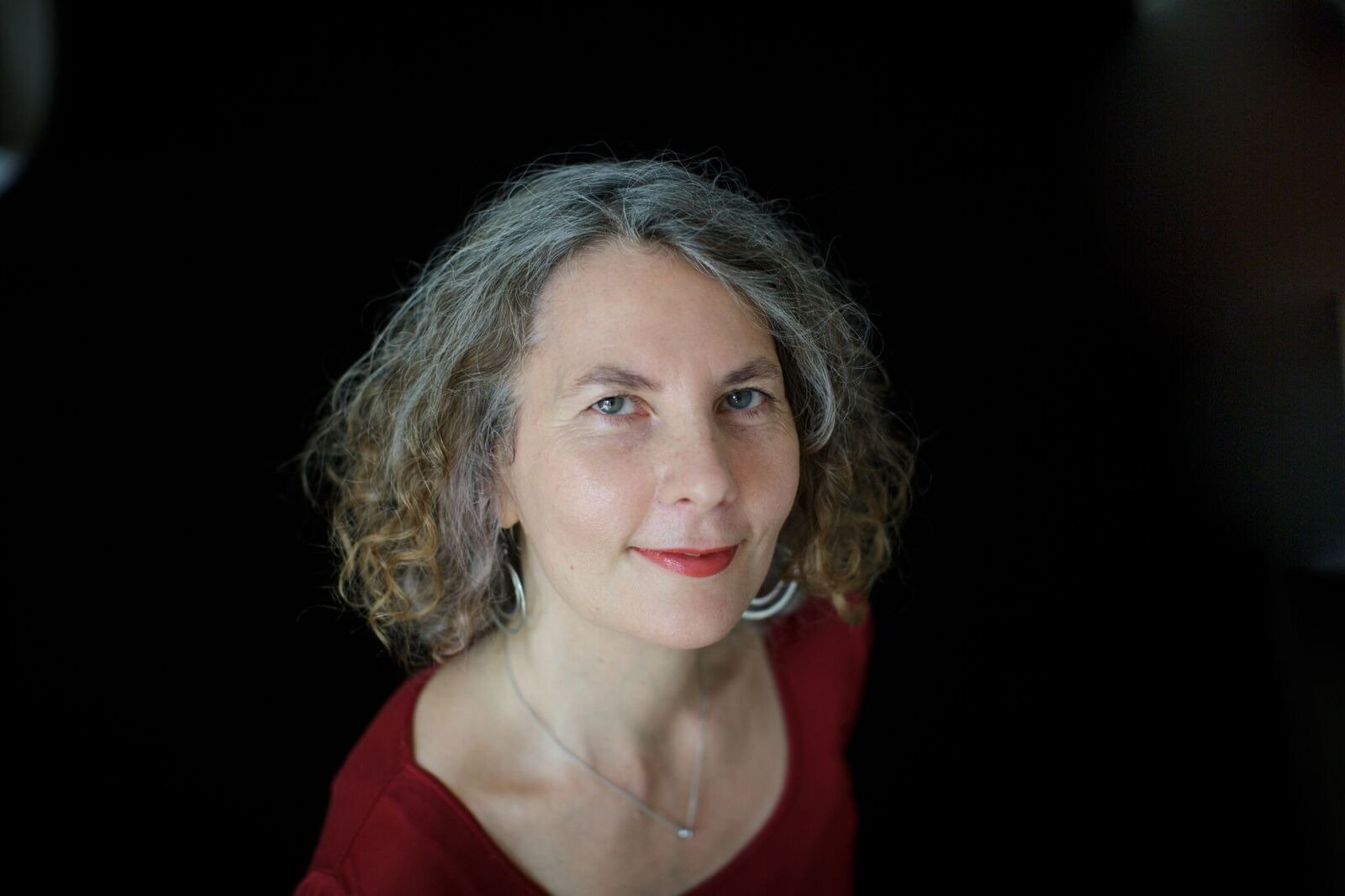
- Born: Barcelona, Spain
- Occupations: Artist, Director, Writer, Animator and producer
- Years active: 1987–present

Catya Plate is a Brooklyn-based filmmaker and multidisciplinary artist. She is best known for her stop-motion animated short-films The Reading, Hanging by a Thread and Meeting MacGuffin.

== Life and career ==
Plate was born in Barcelona, Spain and grew up in Cologne, Germany. She attended to Montessori Gymnasium, Koeln, Germany before earning her fine arts degree at the Kölner Werkschulen and relocated to New York in 1987 through a Fulbright Scholarship for post-graduate Fine Arts studies at the School of Visual Arts. In 1997, she received an Artist in the Marketplace award from the Bronx Museum of the Arts and in 2008 her work was selected for permanent inclusion in the Art Base of the Elizabeth A. Sackler Center for Feminist Art at the Brooklyn Museum.

Plate's debut stop-motion animated short film The Reading, won Best Animated Film at the Seattle True Independent Film Festival. Her second stop-motion animated short film Hanging By A Thread, premiered at Nevada City Film Festival, where it won the Best Animated Short. It also won Spirit Award for Animation at the Brooklyn Film Festival. In 2017, the second short in the trilogy, Meeting MacGuffin, the sequel of Hanging By A Thread, screened at the Academy Awards qualifying Holly Shorts in 2017, won Grand Prize for Best Animated Short at the Academy Awards qualifying Rhode Island International Film Festival, Shorts Production Design Award at the Other Worlds Austin Festival, Merit Award at the Indie Fest, Best Animated Film at the Seattle True Independent Film Festival and Jury Citation Award for Best Animation at the Black Maria Film Festival.

== Filmography ==
Year	Film	Writer	Director	Producer	Notes
2017	Meeting MacGuffin	✓	✓	✓	
2016	Speaking of Freaks	✗	✗	✓	
2013	Hanging by a Thread	✓	✓	✓	
2011	The Reading	✓	✓	✓	
