= Arena Recife-Olinda =

Sports stadium in Pernambuco, Brazil

The Arena Recife-Olinda is a new football stadium arena built for the 2014 World Cup. It is located between Recife and Olinda in the Pernambuco state, with a maximum capacity of 35,480 people. The stadium's estimated construction cost was R$190,000,000. The project was replaced by a new one for a stadium (Arena Cidade da Copa) in São Lourenço da Mata, near Recife.
