= German submarine U-513 =

German World War II submarine

Coordinates: 27°17′S 47°32′W

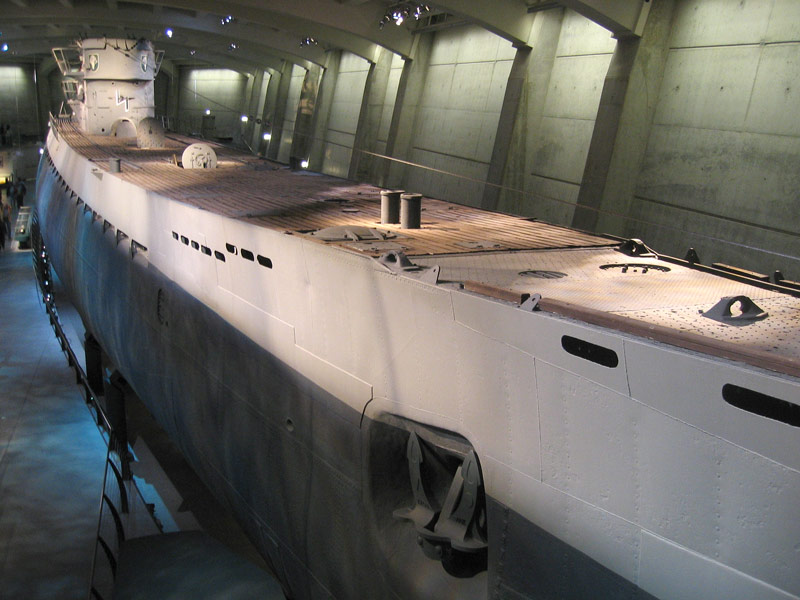
- U-505, a typical Type IXC boat

History

Nazi Germany
- Name: U-513
- Ordered: 14 February 1940
- Builder: Deutsche Werft, Hamburg
- Yard number: 309
- Laid down: 26 April 1941
- Launched: 29 October 1941
- Commissioned: 10 January 1942
- Fate: Sunk on 19 July 1943

General characteristics
- Class & type: Type IXC submarine
- Displacement: 1,120 t (1,100 long tons) surfaced; 1,232 t (1,213 long tons) submerged
- Length: 76.76 m (251 ft 10 in) o/a; 58.75 m (192 ft 9 in) pressure hull
- Beam: 6.76 m (22 ft 2 in) o/a; 4.40 m (14 ft 5 in) pressure hull
- Height: 9.60 m (31 ft 6 in)
- Draught: 4.70 m (15 ft 5 in)
- Installed power: 4,400 PS (3,200 kW; 4,300 bhp) (diesels); 1,000 PS (740 kW; 990 shp) (electric)
- Propulsion: 2 shafts; 2 × diesel engines; 2 × electric motors
- Speed: 18.3 knots (33.9 km/h; 21.1 mph) surfaced; 7.7 knots (14.3 km/h; 8.9 mph) submerged
- Range: 13,450 nmi (24,910 km; 15,480 mi) at 10 knots (19 km/h; 12 mph) surfaced; 64 nmi (119 km; 74 mi) at 4 knots (7.4 km/h; 4.6 mph) submerged
- Test depth: 230 m (750 ft)
- Complement: 4 officers, 44 enlisted
- Armament: 6 × torpedo tubes (4 bow, 2 stern); 22 × 53.3 cm (21 in) torpedoes; 1 × 10.5 cm (4.1 in) SK C/32 deck gun (180 rounds); 1 × 3.7 cm (1.5 in) SK C/30 AA gun; 1 × twin 2 cm FlaK 30 AA guns

Service record
- Part of: 4th U-boat Flotilla; 10 January – 31 August 1942; 10th U-boat Flotilla; 1 September 1942 – 19 July 1943
- Identification codes: M 47 994
- Commanders: K.Kapt. Rolf Rüggeberg; 10 January 1942 – 14 May 1943; Kptlt. Friedrich Guggenberger; 15 May – 19 July 1943
- Operations: 4 patrols: 1st patrol: 7 August – 22 October 1942; 2nd patrol: 21 November – 18 December 1942; 3rd patrol: 20 February – 14 April 1943; 4th patrol: 18 May – 19 July 1943
- Victories: 6 merchant ships sunk (29,940 GRT); 2 merchant ships damaged (13,177 GRT)

German submarine U-513 was a type IXC U-boat built for service in Nazi Germany's Kriegsmarine during World War II.

She was laid down on 26 April 1941 by the naval construction firm Deutsche Werft AG in Hamburg as yard number 309, and commissioned on 10 January 1942. Her commanders were Korvettenkapitän Rolf Rüggeberg (10 January 1942 until 14 May 1943) and Kapitänleutnant Friedrich Guggenberger (15 May until 19 July 1943). Her training period was from 10 January 1942 to 31 August, as part of the 4th U-boat Flotilla. She was then assigned to the 10th U-boat Flotilla for operations.

She sank six ships with a total tonnage of 29,940 gross register tons (GRT) and damaged two more with a total tonnage of 13,177 GRT. The boat was a member of two wolfpacks. She was sunk by depth charges from a U.S. Martin PBM Mariner amphibious aircraft in the South Atlantic Ocean on 19 July 1943.

In 2011 after nine years research and two years of seagoing searches, the expedition led by the explorers of Schurmann Family located U-513, 85 km (46 nmi) east of their hometown of Florianópolis. The find was announced worldwide on 17 June 2011, when the Schürmanns produced images of a Side-scanning sonar. A dive was made in 2012, where photos and video images were recorded.

== Design and construction ==
German Type IXC submarines were slightly larger than the original Type IXBs. U-513 had a displacement of 1,120 tonnes (1,100 long tons) when at the surface and 1,232 tonnes (1,213 long tons) while submerged. The U-boat had a total length of 76.76 m (251 ft 10 in), a pressure hull length of 58.75 m (192 ft 9 in), a beam of 6.76 m (22 ft 2 in), a height of 9.60 m (31 ft 6 in), and a draught of 4.70 m (15 ft 5 in). The submarine was powered by two MAN M 9 V 40/46 supercharged four-stroke, nine-cylinder diesel engines producing a total of 4,400 metric horsepower (3,240 kW; 4,340 shp) for use while surfaced, two Siemens-Schuckert 2 GU 345/34 double-acting electric motors producing a total of 1,000 shaft horsepower (1,010 PS; 750 kW) for use while submerged. She had two shafts and two 1.92 m (6 ft) propellers. The boat was capable of operating at depths of up to 230 metres (750 ft).

The submarine had a maximum surface speed of 18.3 knots (33.9 km/h; 21.1 mph) and a maximum submerged speed of 7.3 knots (13.5 km/h; 8.4 mph). When submerged, the boat could operate for 63 nautical miles (117 km; 72 mi) at 4 knots (7.4 km/h; 4.6 mph); when surfaced, she could travel 13,450 nautical miles (24,910 km; 15,480 mi) at 10 knots (19 km/h; 12 mph). U-513 was fitted with six 53.3 cm (21 in) torpedo tubes (four fitted at the bow and two at the stern), 22 torpedoes, one 10.5 cm (4.13 in) SK C/32 naval gun, 180 rounds, and a 3.7 cm (1.5 in) SK C/30 as well as a 2 cm (0.79 in) C/30 anti-aircraft gun. The boat had a complement of forty-eight.

U-513 was laid down on 26 April 1941 at Deutsche Werft's Hamburg shipyard, as Yard number 309. She was launched on 29 October 1941 and commissioned on 10 January 1942.

== Service history ==
Following commissioning, U-513, under the command of Korvettenkapitän Rolf Rüggeberg, joined the 4th U-boat Flotilla based at Stettin on the Baltic Sea for training and working up.

=== First patrol ===
U-513's first patrol began when she departed Kiel on 7 August 1942, as one of three Type IX U-boats (U-513, U-165 and U-517) assigned to patrol off the mouth of the Strait of Belle Isle to investigate whether Atlantic convoys were being routed through these waters to avoid attack.. The submarine headed for the Atlantic by way of the gap between Iceland and the Faeroe Islands. On the night of 4/5 September 1942, U-513 used poor weather to cover her entry to Conception Bay near Bell Island, Newfoundland, and on 5 September, the submarine torpedoed and sank two freighters at anchor in the bay, the Canadian Lord Strathcona and the British Saganaga. Following this attack, as merchant ships fled the area, one inadvertently struck the submerged U-513, damaging the submarine's conning tower. U-513 continued to patrol off Newfoundland, but heavy fog restricted her activities. On 29 September 1942, U-513 torpedoed the British Liberty ship Ocean Vagabond off St. John's, damaging the merchant ship. U-513 set course for home on 10 October, and arrived at her new base of Lorient, in occupied France on 22 October 1942.

=== Second and third patrols ===
On 21 November 1942, U-513 left Lorient on her second patrol, with orders to patrol off Trinidad and Brazil. On the outbound journey, however, the submarine suffered problems with her fuel system, with the filters and fuel injectors blocked. U-513 rendezvoused with the homecoming U-68 to obtain spare parts, including fuel pumps, but repair attempts failed, and Rüggeberg was forced to abort the patrol, with U-513 arriving back at Lorient on 18 December. Subsequent investigation showed that U-513's problems were caused by aluminium paint in the fuel tanks, which flaked off and clogged the fuel system.

U-513 set out on her third patrol on 20 February 1943. She was assigned to a group of six Type IX U-boats that were ordered to attack convoys setting out from New York City, but when radio intelligence obtained details of Convoy UGS 6, bound for Gibraltar from America carrying supplies for operations in North Africa, the U-boats of the New York task force, including U-513, were ordered to intercept the convoy, forming patrol group Unverzaget, with two more groups (Wohlgemut and Tümmler) also sent against the convoy. U-513 made contact with the convoy on 13 March, and again on 14 March, but on both occasions destroyers from the convoy's escort drove U-513 off, preventing the submarine from making any successful attacks. After attacks against UGS 6 were broken off, U-513 joined another group, Seeräuber, operating south of the Canary Islands in wait for Convoy RS 3. While U-513 made contact with the convoy, and carried out attacks, they were unsuccessful. On her return journey, U-513, was ordered to rendezvous with the blockade runner Irene and escort her into port, but failed to find Irene which was intercepted by the British cruiser-minelayer Adventure on 10 April, with Irene scuttling herself. On 14 April, U-513 rendezvoused with U-526 and a minesweeper escort outside Lorient. At 1 nmi (1.2 mi; 1.9 km) from the port, the minesweeper escort turned away and U-526 moved ahead of U-513, (Note: Normal practice would be that U-513, as the senior boat, would lead U-526 into port.) before striking a British mine. U-526 was blown in two, with 42 men killed, with 12 survivors, 2 of whom were picked up by U-513. After two unsuccessful patrols, U-513's commanding officer, Rolf Rüggeberg, was posted to command the 13th U-boat Flotilla in Norway. Rüggeberg was replaced as U-513's commander by Kapitänleutnant Friedrich Guggenberger, who had sunk the aircraft carrier Ark Royal while in command of U-81 and had been awarded the Knight's Cross with Oak Leaves in January 1943.

=== Fourth patrol ===
U-513's fourth patrol began on 18 May 1943, bound for Brazilian waters along with U-172 and U-199. U-513 refuelled from the tanker submarine U-460 west of Freetown late in the month. On 31 May, U-513 encountered a large freighter sailing alone and after a long surface chase, fired three torpedoes at long range, which missed the target. On 21 June 1943, U-513 torpedoed and sank the Swedish merchant ship Venezia east-south-east of Rio de Janeiro. On 25 June, U-513 attacked the American tanker Eagle, hitting the tanker with one torpedo, but Eagle remained afloat, and was repaired and returned to service. On 1 July 1943, U-513 sank the Brazilian coaster Tutóla, south of São Vicente, São Paulo. On 3 July, U-513 sank the American Liberty ship Elihu B. Washburne off Ilha de São Sebastião and on 16 July sank the American Richard Caswell about 400 nmi (460 mi; 740 km) south of Rio.

On 19 July 1942, Guggenberger sent a long radio signal to U-boat command, reporting on the weakness of Allied anti-submarine defences off Brazil. This transmission gave away U-513's location, and later that day, the submarine was caught on the surface by a Martin Mariner flying boat of US Navy patrol squadron VP-74, piloted by Lieutenant (j.g.) Roy S. Whitcomb southeast of São Francisco do Sul. Guggenberger decided to remain on the surface, trusting in U-513's anti-aircraft guns, but the Mariner carried out a single attack run, dropping four depth charges, which sank the submarine immediately. About 20 men survived the initial sinking and Whitcomb dropped two life rafts and a number of lifejackets, but by the time the seaplane tender Barnegat arrived on the scene, only a single life raft, with seven survivors, including Guggenberger, could be found and rescued. In total, the attack by the three U-boats on Brazilian waters sank nine and damaged two more merchant ships, with two U-boats, U-513 and U-199 sunk.

=== Wolfpacks ===
U-513 took part in two wolfpacks, namely:

- Unverzagt (12 – 19 March 1943)
- Seeräuber (25 – 30 March 1943)

== Summary of raiding history ==
Date	Ship Name	Nationality	Tonnage (GRT)	Deaths	Fate
5 September 1942	Lord Strathcona	Canada	7,335	0	Sunk
5 September 1942	Saganaga	United Kingdom	5,454	30	Sunk
29 September 1942	Ocean Vagabond	United Kingdom	7,174	1	Damaged
21 June 1943	Venezia	Sweden	1,673	0	Sunk
25 June 1943	Eagle	United States	6,003	0	Damaged
1 July 1943	Tutoya	Brazil	1,125	7	Sunk
3 July 1943	Elihu B. Washburne	United States	7,176	0	Sunk
16 July 1943	Richard Caswell	United States	7,177	9	Sunk

== Discovery ==
The wreck was found on 14 July 2011, at a depth of 130 m (430 ft), by Brazilian underwater archeologists from the Instituto Kat Schurmann, the Universidade do Vale do Itajaí (Univali) and geophysicists of the Coastal Planning and Engineering Company. The search for U-513 was conducted with a sail boat and took two years. Another 10 German submarines remained to be discovered in Brazilian coastal waters.

=== U-513 Found/Underwater Footage ===
A Brazilian project searched Brazilian waters for the sunken U-513. She was finally found in 2011, and the first underwater videos of the boat were released in March 2012.

In 2014, a one-hour TV documentary on the history of this voyage featuring film from the era and the submarine's final resting place titled: The Ghost of U-513 was released and has been shown on the Smithsonian Channel. It includes details from the life of captain Friedrich Guggenberger who survived the sinking and the war.

== Bibliography ==
- Blair, Clay (2000). Hitler's U-Boat War: The Hunters 1939–1942. London: Cassell & Co. ISBN 0-304-35260-8.
- Blair, Clay (2000). Hitler's U-Boat War: The Hunted 1942–1945. New York: Modern Library. ISBN 0-679-64033-9.
- Busch, Rainer; Röll, Hans-Joachim (1999). German U-boat commanders of World War II : a biographical dictionary. Translated by Brooks, Geoffrey. London, Annapolis, Md: Greenhill Books, Naval Institute Press. ISBN 1-55750-186-6.
- Busch, Rainer; Röll, Hans-Joachim (1999). Deutsche U-Boot-Verluste von September 1939 bis Mai 1945 [German U-boat losses from September 1939 to May 1945]. Der U-Boot-Krieg (in German). Vol. IV. Hamburg, Berlin, Bonn: Mittler. ISBN 3-8132-0514-2.
- Gröner, Erich; Jung, Dieter; Maass, Martin (1985). Die deutschen Kriegschiffe 1815–1945: Band 3: U-Boote, Hilfskreuzer, Minenschiffe, Netzleger, Sperrbrecher (in German). Koblenz, Germany: Bernard & Grafe Verlag. ISBN 3-7637-4802-4.
- Gröner, Erich; Jung, Dieter; Maass, Martin (1991). U-boats and Mine Warfare Vessels. German Warships 1815–1945. Vol. 2. Translated by Thomas, Keith; Magowan, Rachel. London: Conway Maritime Press. ISBN 0-85177-593-4.
- Kemp, Paul (1997). U-Boats Destroyed - German Submarine Losses in the World Wars. London: Arms & Armour. ISBN 1-85409-515-3.
- Rohwer, Jürgen (2005). Chronology of the War at Sea 1939–1945: The Naval History of World War Two. Annapolis, Maryland, US: Naval Institute Press. ISBN 1-59114-119-2.
- Rohwer, Jürgen (1977). The Critical Convoy Battles of March 1943: The Battle for HX.229/SC122. Annapolis, Maryland, US: Naval Institute Press. ISBN 0-87021-818-2.
- Rohwer, Jürgen (2015). Critical Convoy Battles of WWII: Crisis in the North Atlantic, March 1943. Mechanicsburg, Pennsylvania, US: Stackpole Books. ISBN 978-0-8117-1655-0.
- Sharpe, Peter (1998). U-Boat Fact File. Leicester, UK: Midland Publishing Limited. ISBN 1-85780-072-9.
- Wynn, Kenneth (1998). U-Boat Operations of the Second World War: Volume 2: Career Histories, U511–UIT25. London: Chatham Publishing. ISBN 1-86176-069-8.
