= Car app =

Genre of software

Car apps are a genre of software that offer a car and its driver abilities above what is built-in to the vehicle. Examples of Third-party software for cars include allowing data input while moving, traffic jam assistance, diagnostics and lane-keeping.

These pieces of software can be standalone or linked to the cars computers via the "OBD" (On-board diagnostics) port that is present in almost all cars made since the mid-1990s.

== Overview ==
Schematic of an OBD port.

Android, Windows, and iPhone Operating System (IOS) all offer software to connect a smartphone with a car. Car Play and Android Auto apps transmit the home screen of any Android or IOS smartphone to the car built-in display. Therefore, apps installed on the connected smartphone will become available on car screen. Sometimes car apps require additional hardware which plugs into the on-board diagnostics (OBD) port to record, collect and provide the data about engine errors. Some apps, along with additional hardware, give keyless access to the car and let the owner start the engine using a smartphone. Drivers can install a dash cam app and use a smartphone to capture the driving process. Information about the owner's driving habits can be recorded by car software with the help of OBD port. If the vehicle's speedometer is not functioning properly, car apps can provide accurate car speed. Car software collects live data about road signs, speed limits and traffic cameras ahead. Some car apps send real-time notifications about road accidents and traffic jams en route.

== Types of car apps ==
=== OBD apps ===
On-board Diagnostic apps require an additional piece of hardware called an OBD adapter to be plugged into the OBD port. The OBD app is installed on an appropriate smartphone or tablet, connecting to the OBD adapter through Wifi or Bluetooth signals. Car owners can monitor their vehicle in real time, and receive information about engine temperature, and car performance. OBD codes indicate the location and nature of problems. Often OBD apps offer additional features such as journey recording, CO_{2} emission calculation, horsepower evaluation, dynamo meter, fuel consumption, and driving time. An alarm feature is usually present as well – such apps alert the driver about speeding, low voltage, and high temperature. Some apps perform an analysis of driving behavior, recording car owner's habits, calculating money spent on every mile, and giving tips on improving the riding process.

=== Navigation apps ===
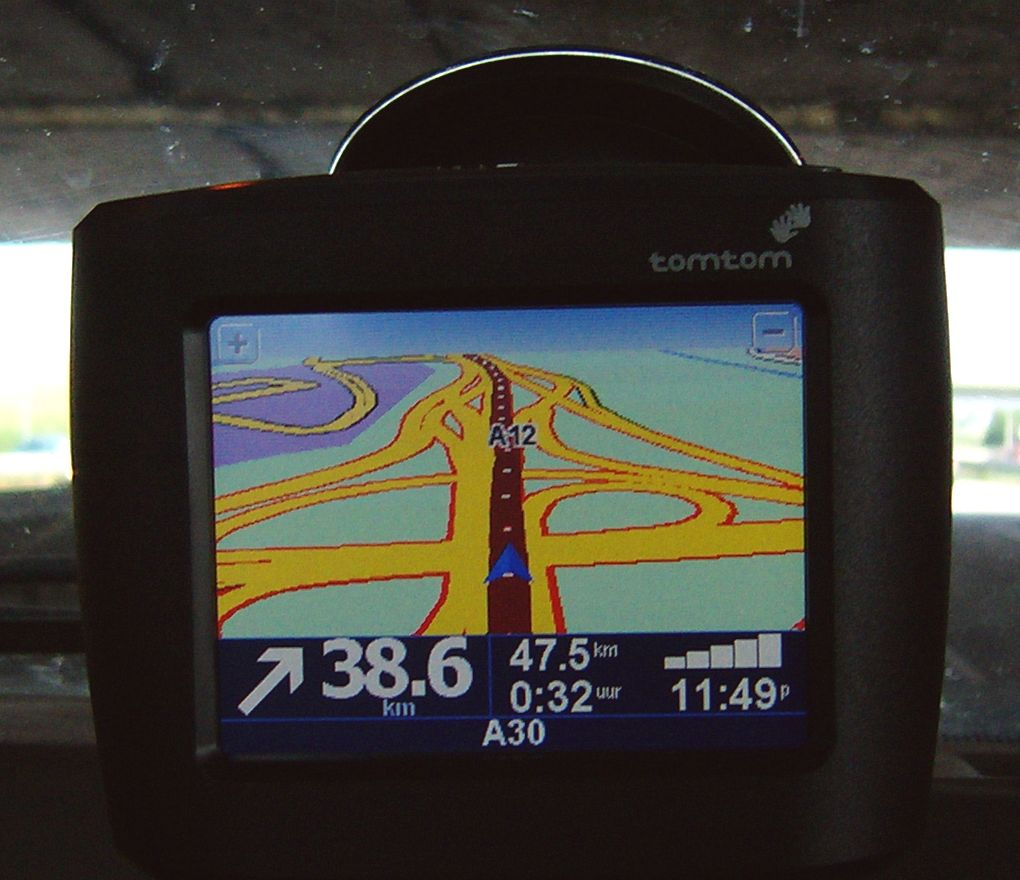

Navigation software can provide data on altitude, moon phase, traffic cameras, and traffic jams. Users can look for addresses using geo-tagged images, and some apps provide a worldwide maps feature where one app contains maps of various cities around the world. Some software can calculate speed, distance covered and provide estimated time to the destination point.

=== Dash cam apps ===
Dash cam apps record everything that happens on the road and can provide essential evidence when investigating road accidents. Most dash cam apps have YouTube integration and upload the recordings to the driver's YouTube account. Some software can turn on automatically when detecting shakes or sudden changes on the road, and record video. The video is recorded in high resolution, and when the device's memory is full, old videos are usually deleted automatically to save space.

=== Voice control apps ===
Apps which support voice commands help users drive safely. These apps make calls, dictate messages, announce the current time, and read weather forecast. Some of the apps also offer Android Auto connectivity Google Maps integration. All of these functions can be controlled with voice commands.

=== Radio substitution apps ===
Some apps provide an alternative to standard car radio. Apps such as Android Auto, Spotify, and Tune In Radio allow the driver to stream music.

=== Car history apps ===
Car history apps maintain a car's maintenance log. It can help in proper maintenance of it and also in increasing its resale value. Without a vehicle history, it's not possible to know the damages or product recalls it may have suffered during the past.

=== Car dealer apps ===
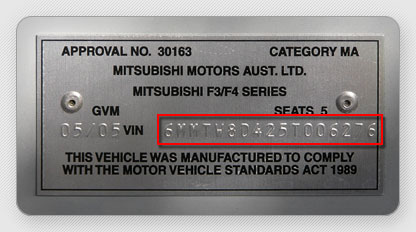
Vin Sample

Apps for car dealers have various features to showcase vehicle inventory. Some of these apps let dealerships show vehicle history reports by reading the Vehicle Identification Number, which can provide detail on all recorded owners, road accidents, repair works, and visits to mechanics. Using this software, dealerships can give their customers detailed report of the car state – damages, year made, provide images, add vehicle options. Some apps offer catalogs of vehicles, GPS indication of inventory location, business management on the go, reports, email integration, SMS integration, add and edit stock info. Some apps are able to collect actual car prices around the world and select the best offers; based on vehicle inspection the software can compare the price and condition of the car. This allows users to compare retail listing prices from the most famous sites.

=== Alerting apps ===
Some of the alerting apps use crowd sourcing – this helps collect up-to-date information about road accidents, traffic jams, and police traps along the route. Some software can automatically send data about the user's location to your friends and family, as an opt-in feature. Apps can also work as a collision-prevention system – they can detect when the car in front suddenly starts to stop using smartphone cameras. Real traffic information is a usual feature of modern vehicle software – a user can shake his smartphone to notify others about jammed street; the app can also offer you an alternative way to your destination to avoid heavy traffic.

=== Car-sharing apps ===
A car can be shared using notifications in the system, a user sets the time the car is available and other people will use it (Link & Co). Uber is a car-sharing app which helps users quickly pick up a car that is nearby and go to the point at cheap rates instead of taking a taxi; or one can offer his car and himself as a driver.

=== Petrol Delivery apps ===
CAFU A petrol delivery app that enables customer to get their petrol delivered and filled at their doorstep. They can save time and money by this.
