= Desaparecidos (film) =

2011 film directed by David Schürmann

- Directed by: David Schürmann
- Written by: David Schürmann; Rafael Blecher
- Starring: Charlene Chagas; Natalia Vidal; Pedro Urizzi; André Madrini; Fernanda Peviani
- Cinematography: Todd Southgate; Pedro Cavalheiro
- Edited by: Paulo Pandolpho
- Music by: Alex Sqaut
- Production company: Schurmann Film Company
- Distributed by: Schurmann Film Company (Brazil); Eventity Entertainment (Sweden)
- Release date: December 9, 2011
- Running time: 72 minutes
- Country: Brazil
- Language: Portuguese
- Budget: R$ 55,000

Desaparecidos is a 2011 Brazilian horror film directed by David Schürmann. The film tells the story of a group of six friends, who after going to a party on an island, mysteriously disappeared, with frightening images of them registered by the cameras. Found by the authorities, these images are the only way to find out what happened to them.

With an independent production, the film was shot for fifteen days in Ilhabela, São Paulo. Filmed as a pseudo-documentary, similar to the American film The Blair Witch Project (1999). It is the first found footage horror feature film of Brazil.

== Cast ==
- Adriana Veraldi as Carla
- André Madrini as Rodrigo
- Charlene Chagas as Alexa
- Fernanda Peviani as Fábia
- Natália Vidall as Kamila
- Pedro Urizzi as Marco
- Francisco Carvalho as Fisherman
- André Madrini as Slave
