= Alvor Agreement =

1975 treaty granting Angola independence

Agreement between the Portuguese State and the National Liberation Front of Angola – "FNLA", the People's Movement for the Liberation of Angola – "MPLA" and the National Union for the Total Independence of Angola – "UNITA"
- A page of one of the four official texts of the Alvor Agreement
- Type: Grant of independence
- Context: Aftermath of the Carnation Revolution
- Drafted: 10 January 1975 – 15 January 1975
- Signed: 12:45, January 15, 1975 (UTC)
- Location: Penina Hotel, Alvor, Portugal 37°9′40.2″N 8°34′48.8″W
- Ratified: January 28, 1975
- Effective: January 28, 1975
- Condition: Ratification by the president of Portugal
- Signatories: Ernesto Melo Antunes; António de Almeida Santos; Mário Soares; António Silva Cardoso; Fernando Reino; António Gonçalves Ribeiro; Fernando Reis Mesquita da Costa Passos Ramos; Pedro Pezarat Correia; Holden Roberto; Agostinho Neto; Jonas Savimbi
- Parties: Portugal; People's Movement for the Liberation of Angola (MPLA); National Liberation Front of Angola (FNLA); National Union for the Total Independence of Angola (UNITA)
- Ratifiers: Francisco da Costa Gomes
- Language: Portuguese

The Alvor Agreement, signed on 15 January 1975 in Alvor, Portugal, granted Angola independence from Portugal on 11 November and formally ended the 13-year-long Angolan War of Independence.

The agreement was signed by the Portuguese government, the People's Movement for the Liberation of Angola (MPLA), the National Liberation Front of Angola (FNLA), National Union for the Total Independence of Angola (UNITA), and it established a transitional government composed of representatives of those four parties. It was not signed by the Front for the Liberation of the Enclave of Cabinda (FLEC) or the Eastern Revolt as the other parties excluded them from negotiations. The transitional government soon fell apart, with each of the nationalist factions, distrustful of the others and unwilling to share power, attempting to take control of the country by force. This initiated the Angolan Civil War. The name of the agreement comes from the village of Alvor, in the southern Portuguese region of Algarve, where it was signed.

== Negotiations ==
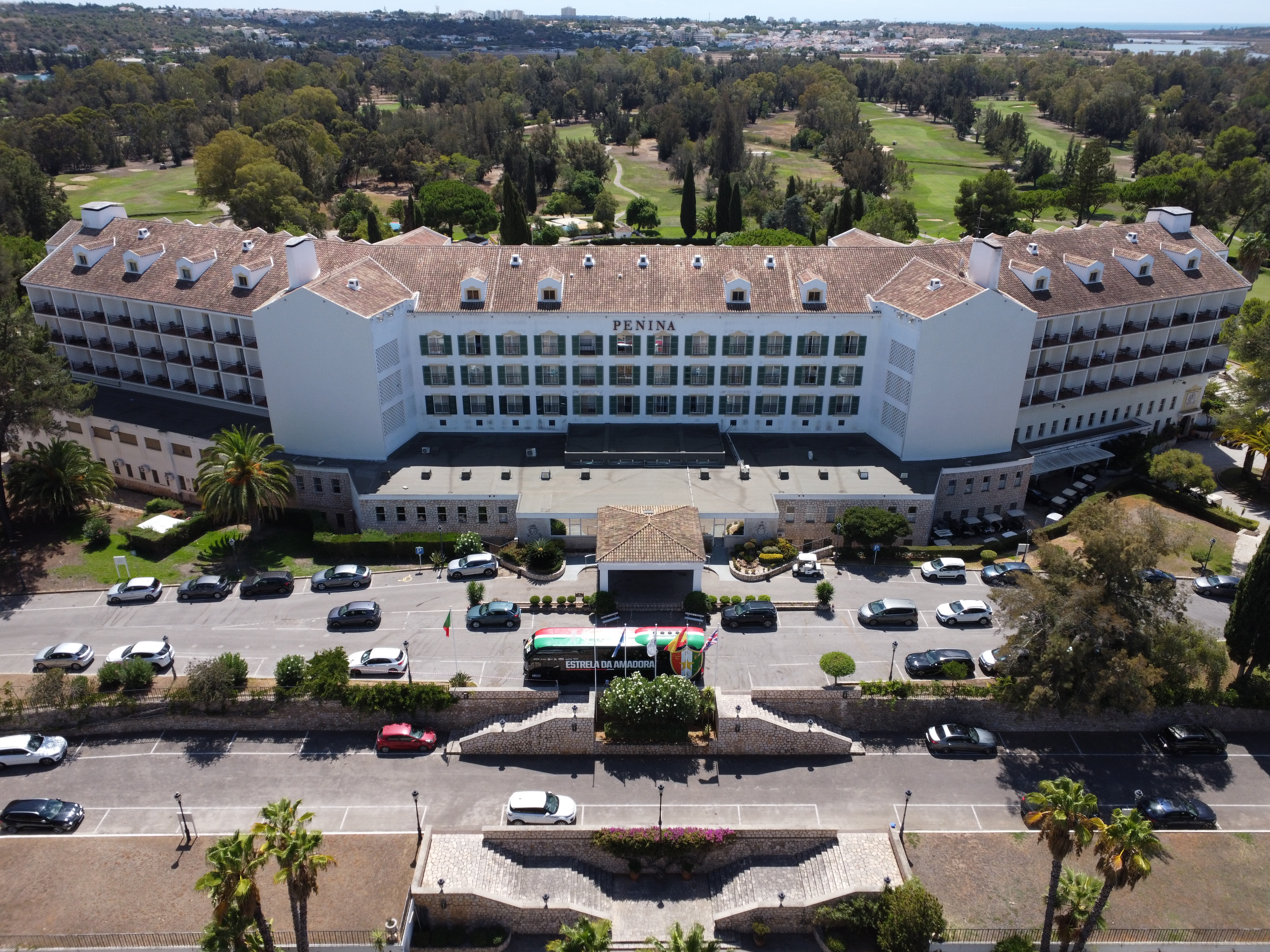
The Penina Hotel in Alvor, where the Alvor Agreement was signed

Leftist military officers overthrew the Caetano government in Portugal in the Carnation Revolution on 25 April 1974. The MPLA, FNLA and UNITA all negotiated peace agreements with the transitional Portuguese government and began to fight one another for control of the Angolan capital, Luanda, and for the rest the country. Holden Roberto, Agostinho Neto, and Jonas Savimbi met in Bukavu, Zaire, in July and agreed to negotiate with the Portuguese as one political entity. They met again in Mombasa, Kenya, on 5 January 1975, agreed to stop fighting one another, and outlined a joint negotiating position on a new constitution. They met for a third time in Alvor, Portugal from January 10–15 and signed what became known as the Alvor Agreement.

== Terms ==
The parties agreed to hold elections for the National Assembly of Angola in October 1975. From 31 January 1975 to independence, a transitional government consisting of the Portuguese High Commissioner Admiral Rosa Coutinho and a Prime Ministerial Council (PMC) would rule. The PMC consisted of three representatives, one from each Angolan party to the agreement, with a rotating premiership among the representatives. Every PMC decision required two-thirds support. The twelve ministries were divided among the Angolan parties and the Portuguese government, three for each. The author Witney Wright Schneidman criticised that provision in Engaging Africa: Washington and the Fall of Portugal's Colonial Empire for ensuring a "virtual paralysis in executive authority". The Bureau of Intelligence and Research cautioned that an excessive desire to preserve the balance of power in the agreement restricted the transitional Angolan government's ability to function.

The Portuguese government's main goal in negotiations was to prevent the mass emigration of white Angolans. Paradoxically, the agreement allowed only the MPLA, FNLA, and UNITA to nominate candidates to the first assembly elections, deliberately disenfranchising Bakongo in the east of the country, the Cabindese (the inhabitants of Cabinda, an exclave north of the rest of Angola, many of whom wished independence separate from Angola), and whites. The Portuguese reasoned that white Angolans would have to join the nationalist movements, and the movements would have to moderate their platforms to expand their political bases.

The agreement called for the integration of the militant wings of the Angolan parties into a new military, the Angolan Defense Forces. The ADF would have 48,000 active personnel, made up of 24,000 local Black soldiers of the Portuguese Army and 8,000 MPLA, FNLA, and UNITA fighters respectively. Each party was to maintain separate barracks and outposts. Every military decision required the unanimous consent of each party's headquarters and the joint military command. The Portuguese forces lacked equipment and commitment to the cause, while Angolan nationalists were antagonistic of each other and lacked training.

The treaty, to which FLEC never agreed, described Cabinda as an "integral and inalienable part of Angola". Separatists see the agreement as a violation of Cabindan right to self-determination. By August 1975 MPLA had taken control of Cabinda.

== Implementation ==
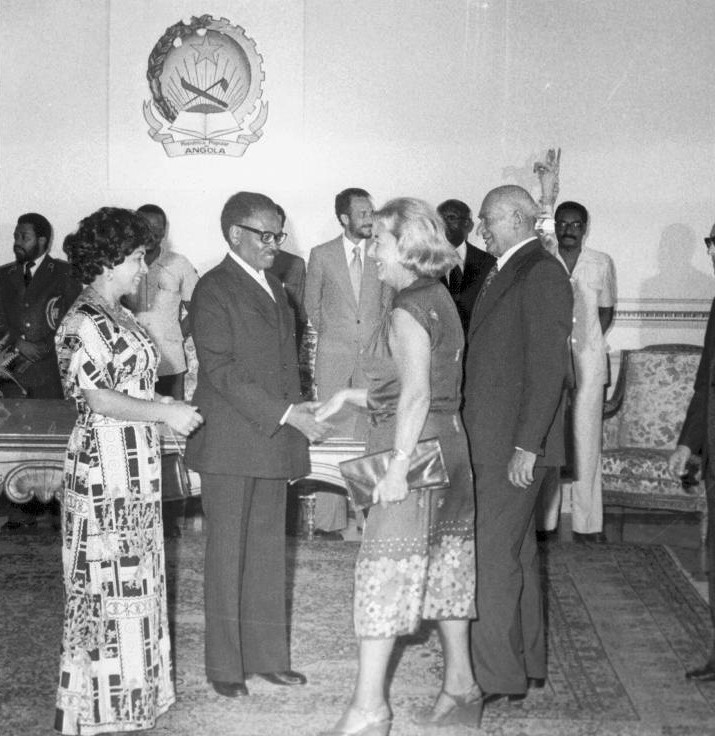
Agostinho Neto, MPLA leader and Angola's first president, meets with Poland's ambassador in Luanda in 1978

The agreement did not establish a mechanism to verify the number of fighters from each force. All three parties soon had forces greater in number than the Portuguese did, which endangered the colonial power's ability to keep the peace. Factional fighting resumed and reached new heights as foreign supplies of arms increased. In February, the Cuban government warned the Eastern Bloc that the Alvor Agreement would not succeed. By spring, the African National Congress and SWAPO echoed Cuba's warning. Leaders of the Organization of African Unity organised a peace conference, moderated by Kenyan President Jomo Kenyatta, with the three leaders in Nakuru, Kenya, in June. The Angolan leaders issued the Nakuru Declaration on 21 June, agreeing to abide by the provisions of the Alvor Agreement while they acknowledged that a mutual lack of trust had led to violence.

Many analysts have criticised the transitional government in Portugal for the violence that followed the Alvor Agreement in terms of a lack of concern for internal Angolan security and favoritism towards the MPLA. High Commissioner Coutinho, one of the seven leaders of the National Salvation Junta, openly distributed ex-Portuguese arms and military equipment to MPLA forces. Edward Mulcahy, Acting Assistant Secretary of State for African Affairs in the United States State Department, told Tom Killoran, the US Consul General in Angola, to congratulate the PMC, rather than the FNLA and the UNITA on their own and Coutinho, for Portugal's "untiring and protracted efforts" at a peace agreement. US Secretary of State Henry Kissinger considered any government involving the pro-Soviet, communist MPLA, to be unacceptable, but US President Gerald Ford oversaw heightened aid to the FNLA.

In July, the MPLA violently forced the FNLA out of Luanda, and the UNITA voluntarily withdrew to its stronghold in the south. There, MPLA forces engaged the UNITA, which declared war. By August, the MPLA had control of 11 of the 15 provincial capitals, including Cabinda and Luanda. South Africa intervened on 23 October, sending 1,500 to 2,000 troops from Namibia into southern Angola. FNLA-UNITA-South African forces took five provincial capitals, including Novo Redondo and Benguela, in three weeks. On 10 November the Portuguese left Angola in accordance with the Alvor Agreement. Cuban-MPLA forces defeated South African-FNLA forces, maintaining control over Luanda. On 11 November, Neto declared the independence of the People's Republic of Angola. The FNLA and the UNITA responded by proclaiming their own government, based in Huambo. By mid-November, the Huambo government had control over southern Angola and began pushing north.

== See also ==
- Bicesse Accords
- Lusaka Accord
- Lusaka Protocol
- Armed Forces Movement
- Nakuru Agreement
- Portuguese Colonial War
