= António Silva Cardoso =

Angolan politician

António Silva Cardoso (3 February 1928 – 13 June 2014) was High Commissioner and Governor-General of Angola in 1975. He was also an author who wrote two books.
