= Jean-Yves Ollivier =

French businessman (born 1944)

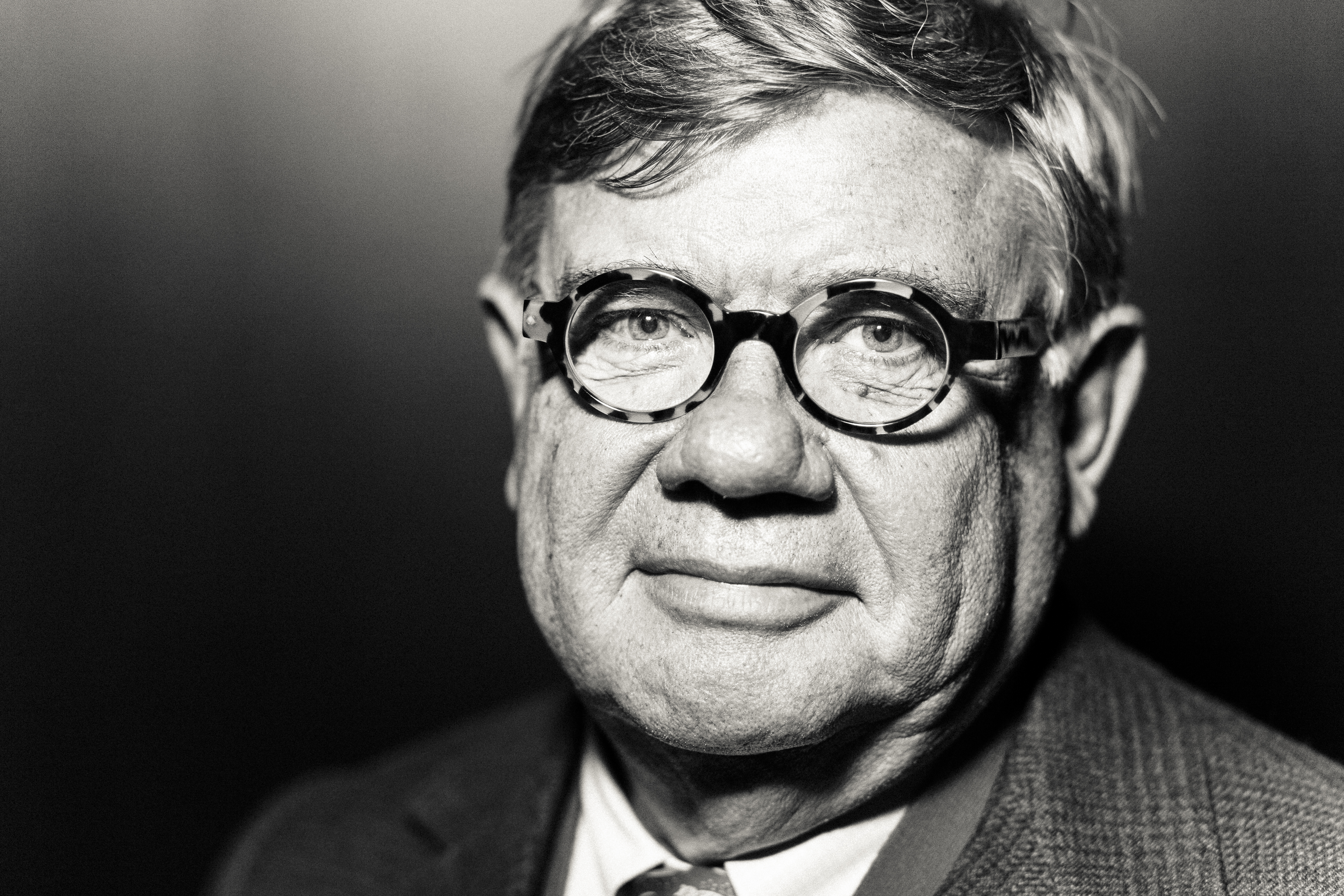
- Jean-Yves Ollivier in Oslo, photo by Johnny Vaet Nordskog
- Born: 8 October 1944 (age 81); Algiers, Algeria
- Occupation: Businessman

Jean-Yves Ollivier (born 8 October 1944 in Algiers, Algeria) is a French businessman who works primarily in the commodities sector in emerging markets.

In addition to his business ventures, Jean-Yves Ollivier is active as a parallel diplomat, using his personal relationships with heads of states to facilitate mediation and peace processes in Africa.

He is the President of the Brazzaville Foundation.

== Biography ==
=== Career ===
Jean-Yves Ollivier began his career in the 1960s. He started working for trading companies doing business between Europe and Africa, including Strauss Turnbull & Co, JA Goldschmidt SA, and Grainex.

During the first half of the 1970s, following the first world oil shock, he started working in the oil and gas sector. In 1980, he started his own oil trading company, Vitank, in association with Henk Vietor, Peter de Savary and Arhmed Mannai.

From 1984 to 1989, he was head of the Coal Trading Corporation (CTC).

In 1994, he created Gestilac SA, and in 2002, PanAf Consultancy GmbH (Zurich) and Pan Africa Consulting(Hong-Kong). He later merged the three companies into one holding corporation: the Fort group.

In 2009, he closed the sale of 25% of offshore Marine XII in Congo Brazzaville waters from ENI and SNPC to London-based company New Age.

=== Parallel diplomacy ===
In the 1980s, Jean-Yves Ollivier became advisor on African affairs to then Mayor of Paris, Jacques Chirac. He remained advisor to Jacques Chirac when the latter became prime minister.

In 1985, Jacques Chirac asked him to undertake a secret mission to free four French hostages held in Lebanon (Marcel Fontaine, Marcel Carton, Jean-Paul Kaufmann and Michel Seurat).

In 1987, Jean-Yves Ollivier secretly negotiated a prisoner exchange between both sides during the South African Border War. The exchange entailed the release of 133 People's Armed Forces for the Liberation of Angola (FAPLA) soldiers and another 50 People's Liberation Army of Namibia (PLAN) guerrillas for a South African special forces captain, Wynand Du Toit. Du Toit was captured by FAPLA two years earlier during Operation Argon, and the South African government was eager to secure his release. The exchange was carried out in Maputo and was also linked to South Africa's decision to release two European anti-apartheid activists it was holding: Pierre-Andre Albertini and Klaas de Jonge.

In December 1988, Jean-Yves Ollivier helped facilitate the Brazzaville Protocol, which brought an end to the South African Border War and provided for the withdrawal of Cuban troops from Angola and South African troops from Namibia, respectively. Ollivier helped set up the negotiations in the Republic of the Congo and persuaded Congolese president Denis Sassou Nguesso to mediate.

In 1989, Jean-Yves Ollivier began a mediation process in Comoros following French mercenary Bob Denard’s coup de force on the islands. He convinced Denard to leave the islands.

In 1990, he organized new South African president Frederik de Klerk's visit to France. It was the first visit by a South African president in France in 40 years. French President François Mitterrand personally received de Klerk.

In 2002, Jean-Yves Ollivier engaged in talks in Sun City. These talks eventually led to a power sharing agreement in Democratic Republic of Congo (DRC) between President Joseph Kabila and several rebel leaders, including Jean-Pierre Bemba, the head of the Mouvement pour la Liberation du Congo (MLC).

Jean-Yves Ollivier is the founding chairman of the Brazzaville Foundation, a non-profit organization that works in conflict resolution and nature conservation. According to the foundation, he facilitated dialogue between various parties in conflict, operating with confidentiality and direct engagement.

== Honors ==
In 1987, Jean-Yves Ollivier received the Order of Good Hope from Foreign minister Roelof “Pik” Botha. In 1995, he was elevated to the grade of Grand Officer of the Order of Good Hope by South African president Nelson Mandela for his role in ending the Apartheid. Jean-Yves Ollivier is the only French non government affiliated individual so far to have received this distinction.

Jean-Yves Ollivier also holds the title of “Officier de la Légion d’honneur” and “Chevalier de l’Ordre National du Mérite” in France, as well as the title of “Commandeur de l’Ordre de Mérite Congolais” in Congo Brazzaville, since February 2014 "Grand officier of Mérite Congolais" and “Grand Officier de l ‘Étoile d’Anjouan” in Comoros.
