= Andrea Duro =

Spanish actress

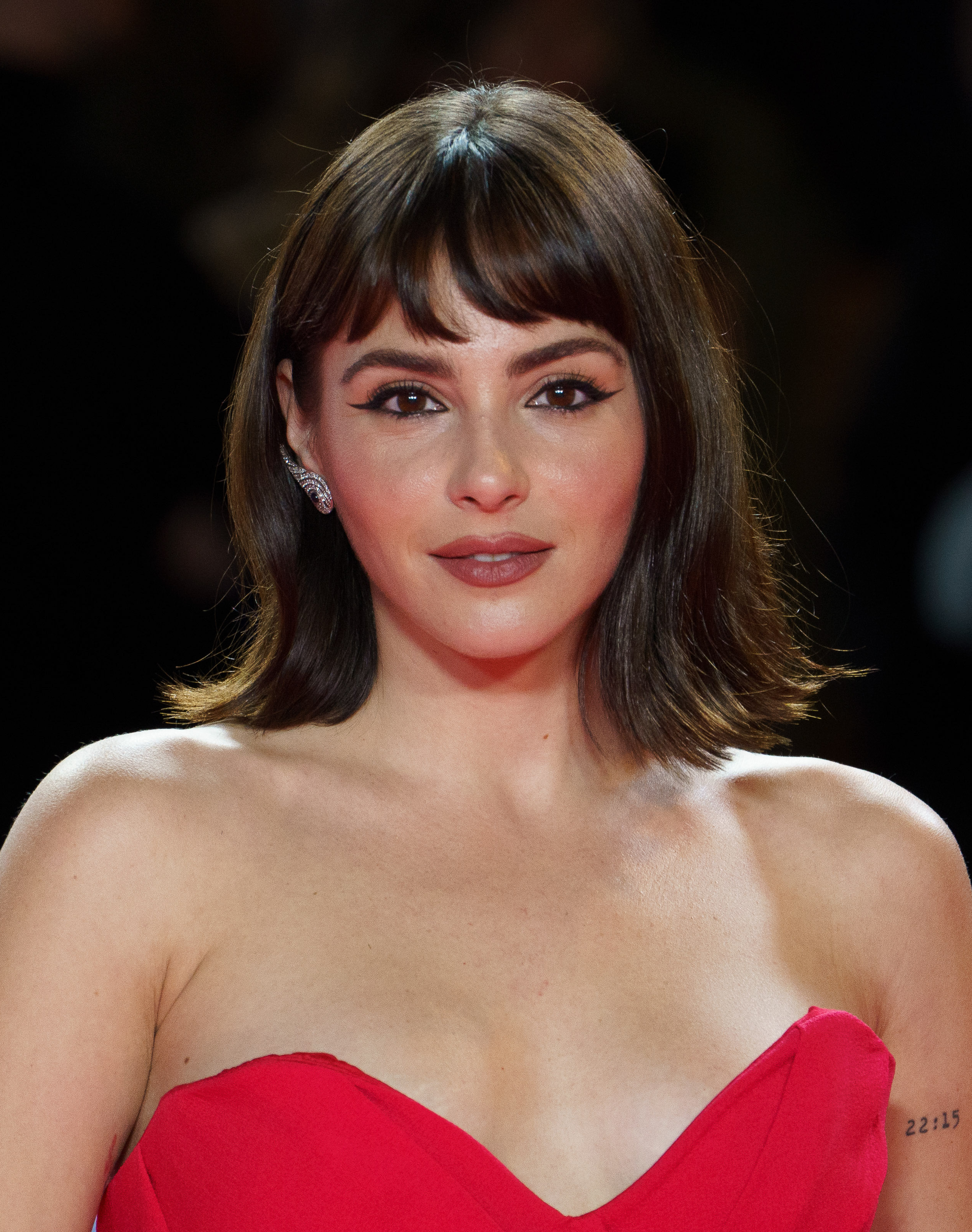
- Duro in 2025
- Born: Andrea Duro Flores; 14 November 1991 (age 34); Fuenlabrada, Spain
- Occupation: Actress
- Years active: 2007–present

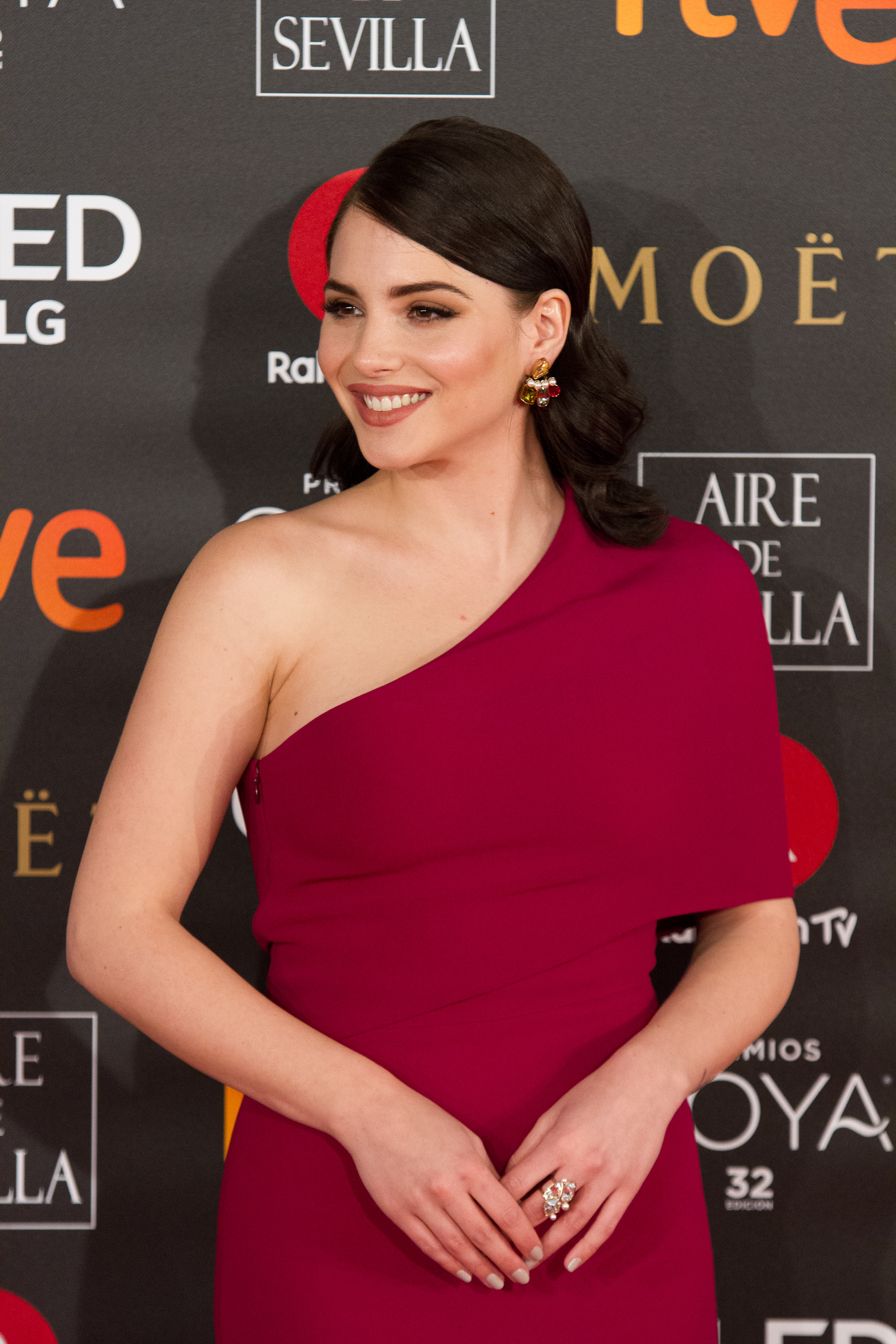
Andrea Duro (Premios Goya 2018)

Andrea Duro Flores (born 14 October 1991) is a Spanish actress. She is known for playing the lead role in the series Física o Química.

== Career ==
In 2007, Duro started her career with fifteen years in the Spanish television series Cuestión de sexo.

From 2008 to 2011, she rose to fame with her role as Yolanda "Yoli" Freire Carballar in the Spanish television series Física o Química.

In 2010, she posed in the British magazine FHM. She made her feature film debut in Three Steps Above Heaven (2010).

In 2012, she joined the Spanish television series El secreto de Puente Viejo.

In 2016, she had a cast appearance with Ruth Núñez in the ninth season of La que se avecina.

In January 2019, it was ended the filming of the TV series Promesas de arena, starring Andrea Duro and Blanca Portillo.

In 2020, it is confirmed that the actress will give life to Yolanda "Yoli" Freire Carballar in Física o químicaː El reencuentro for the platform Atresplayer Premium, where she and Maxi Iglesias are the protagonists.

== Personal life ==
From 2011 to 2014, Andrea Duro was in a relationship with the Spanish actor Joel Bosqued.

From 2019-2021, Andrea Duro was in a relationship with the Cuban model Juan Betancourt.

== Filmography ==
=== Television ===
Year	Title	Character	Channel	Notes
2007	Cuestión de sexo	Berta	Cuatro	2 episodes
2008–2011	Física o Química	Yolanda "Yoli" Freire Carballar	Antena 3	77 episodes
2012	El secreto de Puente Viejo	Enriqueta	Antena 3	159 episodes
2013	Gran Hotel	Celia Velledur	Antena 3	1 episode
2014	Víctor Ros	Nuria	La 1	1 episode
2014	El Rey	Carmen Martínez-Bordiú	Telecinco	1 episode
2014–2015	Amar es para siempre	Lucía Barbate Mínguez	Antena 3	195 episodes
2015	Olmos y Robles	Nuria Atiza	La 1	7 episodes
2016	La que se avecina	Andrea	Telecinco	1 episode
2016	Paquita Salas	Andrea Duro	Flooxer	2 episodes
2017	Perdóname, Señor	Claudia	Telecinco	8 episodes
2017–2019	Velvet Colección	Marie Leduc	Movistar+	21 episodes
2018	Cathedral of the Sea	Aledis Segura	Antena 3	5 episodes
2019	Sí, quedo	Andrea	YouTube	3 episodes
2019	Promesas de arena	Lucía	La 1	6 episodes
2020–2021	Física o Química: El reencuentro	Yolanda "Yoli" Freire Carballar	Atresplayer Premium	2 episodes
2025	La Favorita 1922	Ana Ferrer	Telecinco	16 episodes
2025	Camino a Arcadia	Fayna	Vix	6 episodes
2026	El laberinto de las mariposas			

=== Movies ===
Year	Movie	Character	Director
2010	Three Steps Above Heaven	Mara	Fernando González Molina
2011	Juan of the Dead	Camila	Alejandro Brugués
2012	Ghost Graduation	Mariví Herrera	Javier Ruiz Caldera
2013	Al final todos mueren	Diana	Javier Fesser, Javier Botet, Roberto Pérez Toledo, Pablo Vara and David Galán Galindo
2013	Pixel Theory	Saori Santana	David Galán Galindo
2014	En Apatía: secuelas del Odio	Víctor's friend	Joel Arellanes Duran
2014	Por un puñado de besos	Marta	David Menkes
2014	Perdona si te llamo amor	Olivia	Joaquín Llamas
2014	Los amigos raros	Paloma	Roberto Pérez Toledo
2015	Los miércoles no existen	Paula	Peris Romano
2016	Pasaje al amanecer	Clara	Andrés Castro
2020	La maldición del guapo	Aldana	Beda Docampo Feijoó
2021	Carpoolers	Elisa	Hugo Martín Cuervo
2021	Xtreme	María	Daniel Benmayor
2022	Todos lo hacen	Mariví	Hugo Martín Cuervo
2024	Nueva Tierra	Maya	Mario Pagano
2025	Pequeños calvarios	Paola	Los hermanos Polo
2026	Crisálida		Elsa Núñez
2026	Luottomies: Lepoloma	Raquel	Kari Ketonen

=== Television Programs ===
Year	Program	Channel	Notes
2010	El Hormiguero	Antena 3	Guest
2018	Vergüenza ajena	Neox	Collaborator
2019	The Resistance	Movistar+	Guest
2021	El Hormiguero	Antena 3	Guest

=== Theater ===
Year	Title	Character	Director	Theater
2017	S.I.N.G.L.E.S.	Bea	Pepe Cabrera and Javier Andrés	Teatro Lara

=== Videoclips ===
Year	Artist	Song
2008	Despistaos	Física o química
2013	Pez Limón	Redes
2014	Maldita Nerea	Perdona si te llamo amor
2016	Zahara	Caída Libre
2018	Alberto Robledo	Dolce Vita

== Awards and nominations ==
Year	Award	Category	Work	Result
2011	Kapital Awards	Best New Actress	Three Steps Above Heaven	Winner
2011	Magazine Estrella Awards	Best National Television Actress	Física o Química	Winner
2014	Un Futuro de Película Awards	Cabra Audiovisual Contest		Winner
