= Recife Cinema Festival =

Film and audiovisual festival in Recife, Brazil

Coordinates: 8°3′S 34°54′W

- Location: Recife, Brazil
- Founded: 1997; 29 years ago
- Founded by: Alfredo and Sandra Bertini
- Festival date: April/May
- Website: Official website

Recife Cinema Festival, also known as Recife Audiovisual Festival or Cine-PE, is a competitive film and audiovisual festival hosted in Recife. It is dedicated to the Brazilian and state production of feature and short films, as well as videos and documentaries.

== History ==
The festival was founded in 1997 by the couple Alfredo and Sandra Bertini, who have been the directors since then. Between 1997 and 2008, there have been 1806 films participating (between competitive applications and national and international invitations) of all types and genres for a public of over 25,0000 people.

The main trophy given by the organization between a specialized and independent judge is designated of Calunga (which is a puppet used by maracatu dancers), for the diverse film categories represented. Also, another important trophy is the Gilberto Freyre, addressed for the feature film that best express the appreciation of Brazilian identity through the concept of racial diversity, that characterizes the Brazilian ethnic formation and culture. Other prizes are given by independent private partners, usually in money, and distributed by the diverse categories.

The festival is held usually between the end of April/May, in the Conventions Center of Recife (CECON). It also includes seminars, workshops, meetings, musicals, arts exhibition, which attract many cinema professionals and/or film lovers, making this festival one of the most important in the Brazilian film market.

== Awards ==
List of current awards and their winners in the 12th Recife Cinema Festival - of the Brazilian Cinema, held in 2008.

=== Brazilian Feature Film Awards ===
- Best Picture - Nossa vida não cabe num opala, (fiction)
- Best Director - Rodolfo Naunni, (for O retorno), (documentary)
- Best Actor - Chico Santana, (for Simples mortais), (fiction)
- Best Actress - Maria Mendonça, (for Nossa vida não cabe num opala)
- Best Supporting Actor - Eduardo Moraes (for Simples mortais)
- Best Supporting Actress - Cleyde Yacones, (for Bodas de papel), (fiction)
- Best Screenplay - Di Moretti, (for Nossa vida não cabe num opala)
- Best Film Edition - Ligia Walker, (for Brizola tempos de luta), (documentary)
- Best Sound Edition - Fernando Manna & Simone Alves, (for Bodas de papel)
- Best Photography - Roberto Filho, (for O retorno)
- Best Original Music Score - Amalfi & Mario Botolotto, (for Nossa vida não cabe num opala)
- Best Art Direction - Mónica Palazzo, (for Nossa vida não cabe num opala)
- Popular Jury Award - Bodas de Papel, (from André Sturm)

=== Brazilian Short Films Awards ===
- Best Picture - Os filmes que não fiz, (from Gilberto Scarpa), (fiction)
- Best Director - Esmir Filho, (for Saliva), (fiction)
- Best Actor - Jonathan Haagesen, (for Comprometendo a atuação), (fiction)
- Best Actress - Helena Albergaria, (for Um ramo), (fiction)
- Best Screenplay - Leandro Maciel & César Cabral, (for Dossiê rê bordosa), (animation)
- Best Film Edition - Caroline Leone, (for Saliva)
- Best Sound Edition - Aurélio Dias & Leonardo Lette, (for Ocidente), (documentary)
- Best Photography - Lula Carvalho, (for Trópico das cabras), (fiction)
- Best Original Music Score - Claúdio Ferreira, (for Dossiê rê bordosa)
- Best Art Direction - Alonso Pafyeze, (for Os filmes que não fiz)

=== Pernambuco Awards ===
- Best Feature Film - Amigos de risco, (from Daniel Bandeira), (fiction), PE
- Best Short Film - Miró: Preto, pobre, poeta e periférico, (from Wilson Freire), (documentary from Pernambuco)

=== Special awards ===
- Gilberto Freyre Trophy - Guia prático, histórico e sentimental da cidade do Recife, (from Léo Falcão), (documentary), (PE)

== Recife cinema history ==
Recife and consequently Pernambuco has a tradition in the Brazilian film-making history. Regional movements emerged in the pioneering era of Brazilian cinema. One of those was designated Ciclo de Recife (Recife cycle), between 1922 and 1931. Despite adverse conditions, during this cycle 13 feature films (mostly drama and romance) and seven realistic films (usually ordered by authorities to show their public works) were produced in Recife. Despite the pervasive influence of American cinema and European cinemas in the silent film times, the Recife cycle was one of the most important, regional and productive of them. One of the most important movie was Aitaré da Praia, which is recognized for pioneering the rise of regional themes (1925). Other large successful films was Retribuição (1923) and A Filha do Advogado (1926). Another important phase of the Pernambuco/Recife film history came in the 1970s with a movement called Super 8, often used for home videos and documentaries realized by students, curious and aspirant film makers, due to the utilization of 8 mm film, proportioned by the new technology released by Kodak.

Trying to revitalize the importance and history of Recife cinema, the Bertinis created this cultural festival in 1997.

== See also ==
- Official Website
- Cinema of Brazil
