= Bicesse Accords =

1991 agreement to transition to democracy in Angola

The Bicesse Accords, also known as the Estoril Accords, laid out a transition to multi-party democracy in Angola under the supervision of the United Nations' UNAVEM II mission. President José Eduardo dos Santos of the MPLA and Jonas Savimbi of UNITA signed the accord in Lisbon, Portugal on May 31, 1991. UNITA rejected the official results of the 1992 presidential election and renewed their guerrilla war.

== Negotiation ==
UNITA and the Angolan government began six rounds of negotiations in April 1991. The Portuguese government represented by foreign minister José Manuel Barroso mediated the discussion while officials from the U.S. and Soviet governments observed.

== Treaty terms ==
The Angolan government and UNITA formed the Joint Verification and Monitoring Commission and the Joint Commission on the Formation of the Angolan Armed Forces. The JVMC oversaw political reconciliation while the latter monitored military activity. The accords attempted to demobilize the 152,000 active fighters and integrate the remaining government troops and UNITA rebels into a 50,000-strong Angolan Armed Forces (FAA). The FAA would consist of a national army with 40,000 troops, navy with 6,000, and air force with 4,000. Multi-party elections monitored by the United Nations would be held in September 1992.

== Implementation ==
While the UN declared the presidential election generally "free and fair," fighting continued. 120,000 people were killed in the first eighteen months following the 1992 election, nearly half the number of casualties of the previous sixteen years of war. The Lusaka Protocol of 1994 reaffirmed the Bicesse Accords.

== See also ==
- Angolagate
- Alvor Agreement
- Nakuru Agreement
- Lusaka Protocol
