= Schurmann Family =

The Schürmann Family is the first Brazilian family to circumnavigate the world on a sailboat and the only Brazilian family to have done it three times. The family has been active around the world through their online school program, as well as their films and TV programs such as Rede Globo, National Geographic among others.

In 1984 Vilfredo, Heloisa and their children left their home, work and school and set off from Florianópolis, the capital city of the State of Santa Catarina, in southern Brazil, to pursue their dream: circumnavigate the world on a sailboat. Their children, Pierre, David and Wilhelm, were 15, 10 and 7 years old, respectively. On this first adventure, the Schürmann Family spent 10 years at sea.

In 1997 the Schürmann Family began their second great adventure Magellan Global Adventure. The goal was to retrace the route sailed by Ferdinand Magellan’s fleet, the first complete circumnavigation of the planet's history. For this adventure, apart from the Vilfredo and Heloisa only their son David Schürmann and Kat, their 5-year-old daughter went along. Magellan Global Adventure was followed by more than 1,5 million people, from 44 countries. Every month the adventure’s filmed reports, were broadcast internationally, with an average of 40 million television viewers in Brazil and many more around the world. After 30 months, the Schürmanns' yacht returned to Brazil.

In 2011, the Schürmanns led the expedition that for the first time in Brazilian history a World War II German U-boat was located in its waters. After 9 years research and 2 years of seagoing searches the German submarine U-513 was located 85km east of their hometown of Florianópolis. The find was announced worldwide on June 17th 2011, when the Schürmanns produced images of a Side-scanning sonar.

In Vilfredo’s words, “the bond that keeps our family so united is that we were, are and will be dreamers. Forever.”

On September 21, 2014, the Schurmann Family set off on their new sustainable sailboat to sail around the world for the third circumnavigation: The Orient Expedition followed the routes of the Chinese that, according to controversial theories, were the first sailors to travel around the globe, before Ferdinand Magellan. The new project brought aboard innovation, technology and sustainability. The children Pierre and David (land crew leader) participated in some sections of the adventure whereas Wilhelm (Skipper) was on board throughout the expedition. The youngest, Kat will be symbolically present by inspiring the name of the new sailboat. And, for the first time, the crew gets a representative of the third generation: Emmanuel, he will accompany his grandparents throughout the voyage.

The Orient Expedition also involves important actions, such as an educational project in partnership with Estácio and the production of National Geographic and a feature documentary. Based on samples collected during the trip, the Biological Oceanography Department of a renowned university (USP) have conducted a study with quality analyses of waters and planktons where the boat sailed

In 2019 the Schurmann family launched the VOICE OF THE OCEAN initiative, with the goal of bringing awareness, solutions and education to the worlds Oceans challenges. The initiative includes a two-year sailing expedition, TV series, experiences, Open Innovation start-up search and a data gathering project for Scientific use around the world.

== Members ==
The family members are: Vilfredo, Heloisa, Pierre, David Schurmann, Wilhelm and Kat Schürmann (d. 2006).

== The family in media ==
The family has released 4 best sellers in Brazil, and one box office hit documentary film:

=== Books ===
- Ao Vento (2010) Portuguese/English by David Schurmann
- Pequeno Segredo (2010) Portuguese by Heloisa Schurmann
- Pequeno Segredo (2013) Italian by Heloisa Schurmann
- Em Busca do Sonho (2006) not yet translated by Heloisa Schurmann
- Momentos De uma Aventura (2001) Portuguese/English by Vilfredo Schurmann
- Um Mundo de Aventuras (2002) not yet translated by Heloisa Schurmann
- 10 Anos No Mar (1995) by Heloisa Schurmann

=== Films & TV ===
- Schurmann Family - Orient Expedition (TV series)
- O Mundo em Duas Voltas (The World Twice Around or The World in Two Round Trips) 2007 (film)
- Em Busca do Sonho (film)
- Magellan Global Adventure (TV series)
- Schurmann Family 20 years (TV series)
