= Nakuru Agreement =

1975 truce in Angola

The Nakuru Agreement, signed on June 21, 1975, in Nakuru, Kenya, was an attempt to salvage the January 15 1975 Alvor Agreement, which granted Angola independence from Portugal and established a transitional government. While the Nakuru Agreement did produce a short truce between the three nationalist movements—the Popular Movement for the Liberation of Angola (MPLA), National Liberation Front of Angola (FNLA), and National Union for the Total Independence of Angola (UNITA)— clashes resumes on July 9, 1975.

== Negotiation ==
The three principal separatist leaders, MPLA's Agostinho Neto, UNITA's Jonas Savimbi, and the FNLA's Holden Roberto met in Nakuru from June 15–21. Kenyan President Jomo Kenyatta moderated the negotiations. The leaders "denounce[d] the use of force as a means of solving problems" and again agreed to put down their arms and disarm civilians.
