= Marcela Pérez de Cuéllar =

Peruvian philanthropist and advocate (1933–2013)

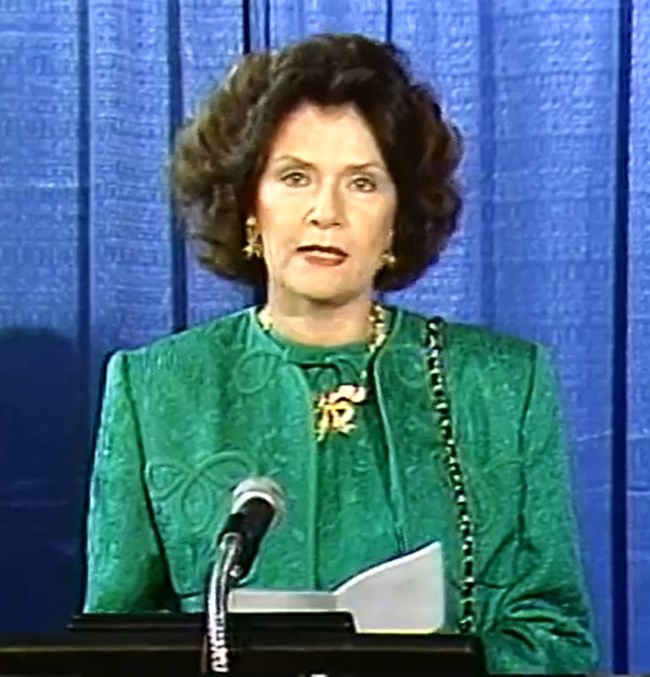
- Pérez de Cuéllar speaking at the United Nations, 1987
- Born: Marcela Magdalena Augusta Temple Seminario; 14 August 1933; Piura, Peru
- Died: 1 July 2013 (aged 79); Brussels, Belgium
- Other names: Marcela Temple de Ganoza, Marcela Temple Perez de Cuellar, Marcela Temple Seminario

Marcela Pérez de Cuéllar (née Marcela Magdalena Augusta Temple Seminario: 14 August 1933 – 1 July 2013) was a Peruvian philanthropist, children's rights advocate, and historic and cultural preservationist. She served as the first lady of the United Nations during the two terms her husband Javier Pérez de Cuéllar was Secretary-General (1982–1991) and later as his hostess during his tenure as Prime Minister of Peru (2000–2001) and Peruvian ambassador to France (2001–2004). Born in Piura, into an affluent home, she studied languages in Lima, becoming fluent in English and French. She married young, had five children, and became involved in programs to assist poor children in attaining an education. Following earlier marriages, she married Javier Pérez de Cuéllar and served as his advisor and hostess during diplomatic missions and his tenure at the United Nations.

Although not an official position, as first lady she held numerous honorary positions for the UN. She proposed and in 1983 became honorary president of the first child care facility created for UN workers, was honorary chair of the UN Decade of Disabled Persons (1983–1992) global planning committee, and was honorary chair of the Global Cooperation for a Better World Project, created to support the United Nations' International Year of Peace celebrations in 1986. She hosted the luncheon for outgoing first lady Nancy Reagan, incoming first lady Barbara Bush and Soviet first lady Raisa Gorbacheva in 1988. That year, she was also one of the first two women appointed as UNIFEM Goodwill Ambassadors. In addition to her official duties as hostess, Pérez de Cuéllar was one of the founders of the Children's Fund for Southern Africa, an organization dedicated to assisting mothers and children with basic needs. Dedicated to world peace, she received the Together for Peace award at a celebration held at the UN in 1989. Interested in preserving historic and cultural heritage, she began working with the World Monuments Fund in 2001. She was instrumental in introducing the organization to Peru and organizing preservation efforts there. In 2010, she was appointed as the first president of the Peruvian branch of the organization and was first recipient of the World Monuments Fund's "Watch Award" in 2012.

== Early life, education, and family ==
Marcela Magdalena Augusta Temple Seminario (Note: In Spanish naming customs, people usually carry the surname of the father, followed by the surname of the mother. The father's surname is typically used when speaking of or addressing the person. Upon marriage, a woman does not lose her own surname, but may elect to add her husband's surname using for example de Ganoza. If a person has a common surname, as in the case of Pérez, they may use a composite last name such as Pérez de Cuellar to signify that their ancestry stems from a particular family of people with that surname. Persons who move from Spanish-speaking countries to countries where other languages are spoken, may drop their second surname, hyphenate their two surnames, or in the case of a married woman, adopt the husband's surname.) was born on 14 August 1933 in Piura, Peru, to María Magdalena (née Seminario) and Alberto Ricardo Temple. Her father owned a cotton mill and grew cotton in the northern part of Peru. He encouraged his seven children to travel and expand their education. All of them except Marcela chose to study abroad. She attended convent school and then moved to Lima to study English. Although Spanish was her native language, she also spoke French fluently. On 13 September 1952, she married Francisco Antonio de Zela Hurtado in Piura, who died in an airplane crash one month later. She later married Guillermo Ganoza Vargas, with whom she had five children: Marcela, Ricardo, Claudia, Juan Esteban, and Gonzalo Ganoza Temple. He was a lawyer, entrepreneur, and philanthropist, who was intent on preserving marinera, as the national dance of Peru by starting the National Competition of Marinera. Strongly aware of the privilege her family had enjoyed, Temple de Ganoza tried to raise her children with an awareness of the need to care for the poor. In 1965, she sponsored two boys and a girl, paying for their education and material needs. She and Ganoza divorced in the 1970s, and in 1975, she married Javier Pérez de Cuéllar. Javier was a Peruvian lawyer and diplomat, having served in France, Britain, Bolivia, Brazil, Switzerland, the Soviet Union, Poland, and Venezuela. In France, he met and married Yvette Roberts, with whom he had two children, before divorcing. In 1971, he became the permanent representative for Peru to the United Nations. In 1976, Javier's work took them to Cyprus and the couple were then in the Soviet Union and Afghanistan until 1981, when they returned to Peru, in expectation of being posted to Brazil.

== Career ==
=== First lady of the United Nations (1982–1991) ===
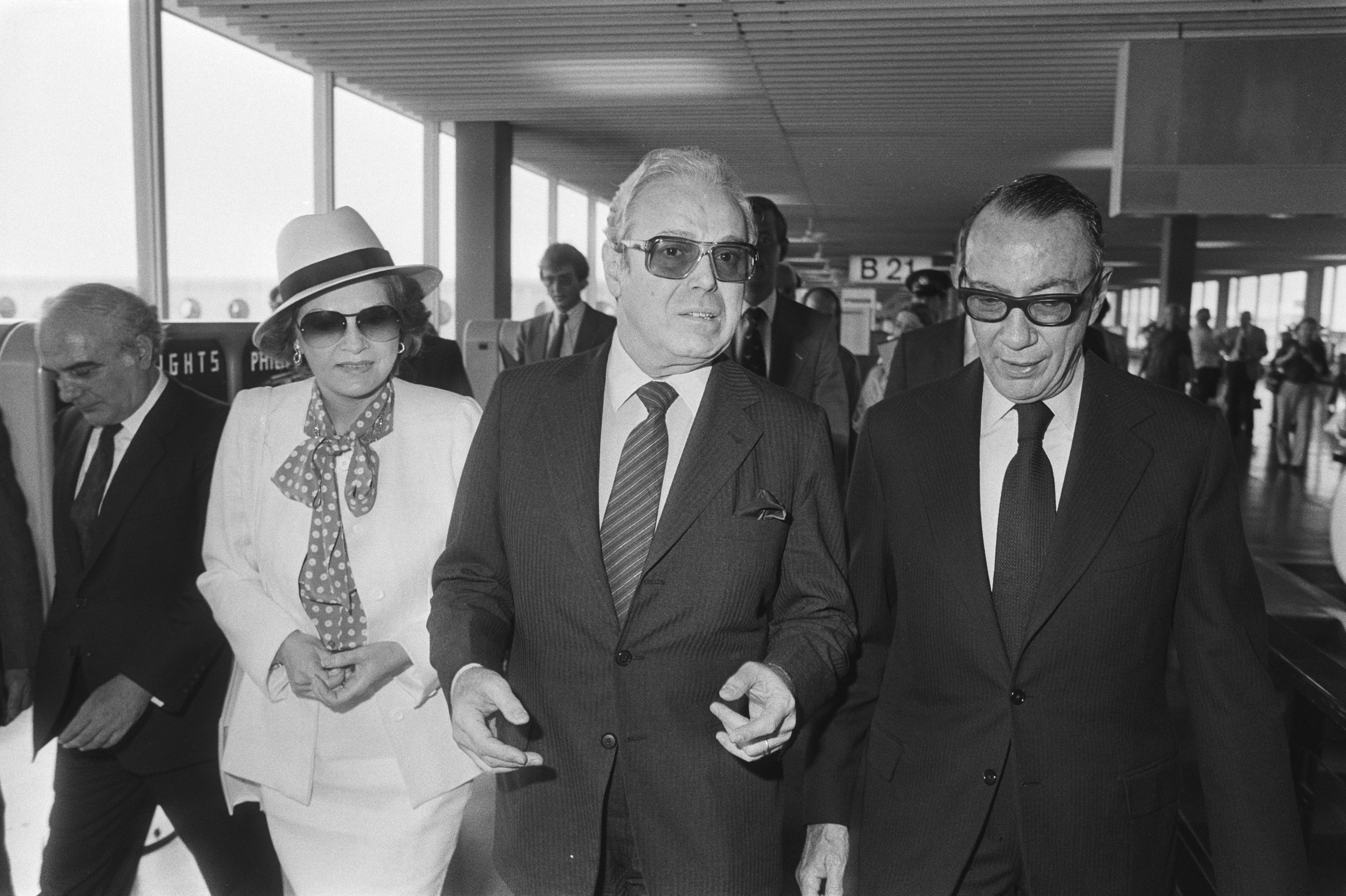
(l) Marcela and (m) Javier Pérez de Cuéllar arriving at the Amsterdam airport, 1982

In December 1981, Javier was named the fifth Secretary-General of the United Nations by the United Nations Security Council. Although not an official post, as first lady, Pérez de Cuéllar had numerous responsibilities as the hostess of world leaders and dignitaries and as an advisor and confidant to her husband. One of the first tasks on which she focused was breaking the 30-year stalemate in creating a child care facility for UN workers. Initially Pérez de Cuéllar thought that she and other women would run the facility themselves, but official authorization was finally given in 1983, and Pérez de Cuéllar was named its honorary president. A humanitarian mission to Ethiopia during the 1984 famine had a profound effect on her awareness of suffering and the disconnect between the amount of money governments spend to eliminate global poverty and that spent on war and armaments. She became passionate about efforts to provide assistance and maintain peace. In 1987, Pérez de Cuéllar co-created a foundation called the Children's Fund for Southern Africa (CHISA). Other founders included Jacqueline Jackson, US peace activist and writer; Miriam Makeba, South African musician and civil rights activist; Sally Mugabe, First Lady of Zimbabwe; Maria Eugénia Neto, former First Lady of Angola; and Dabanga dos Santos, a Mozambican attaché to the United Nations. The organization was established to address problems, such as lack of education, food, health care, shelter, and adequate clothing for mothers and children in Southern Africa, which mainly stemmed from on-going conflicts. They created orphanages and collected materials in support of education and entertainment. They were also able to establish free health clinics in cities and mothers' brigades to run educational campaigns on health, disease prevention, and immunization in schools.

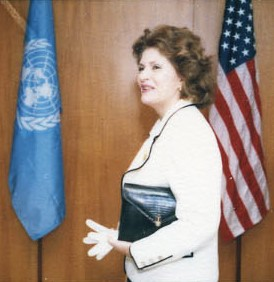
Perez de Cuellar, 1988

In addition to her obligations hosting the representatives of heads of state and government and accompanying Javier to more than 20 countries, Pérez de Cuéllar was responsible for caring for the visiting wives of diplomats. She hosted numerous luncheons and philanthropic events both at UN offices and in their private residence, a former home of financier J. P. Morgan in Sutton Place, Manhattan. A particularly important luncheon involved hosting Raisa Gorbacheva, when her husband Soviet leader Mikhail Gorbachev spoke the to United Nations in 1988. The luncheon served as Gorbacheva's last official meeting with outgoing First Lady of the United States Nancy Reagan and her first introduction to incoming First Lady Barbara Bush. Because of the well-known tension between Reagan and Gorbacheva, the media focused on the event, with reports appearing in newspapers across the US and in Paris. Despite expectations, the luncheon was successful and all of the guests remained cordial and friendly. Guests beside the first ladies included Maria Pia Fanfani, an International Red Cross vice president and the wife of the former Prime Minister of Italy, Amintore Fanfani; Svetlana Maksimov, wife of the Byelorussian delegate to the UN; Anne Morel, wife of Argentine Foreign Minister Dante Caputo; Dina Udovenko, wife of the Ukrainian delegate to the UN; and other diplomatic wives. Other women in attendance included socialite and philanthropist Brooke Astor, cosmetics icon Estée Lauder, and television personality Barbara Walters. Both Bush and Reagan included descriptions of the luncheon in their memoirs.

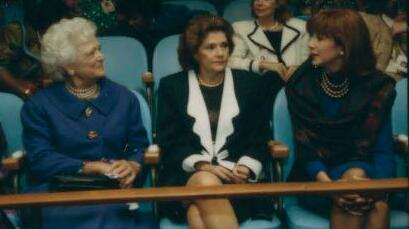
Barbara Bush, Marcela Pérez de Cuéllar, Mila Mulroney at the United Nations, 1990

Among other significant roles Pérez de Cuéllar held during her tenure as first lady were honorary chair of the UN Decade of Disabled Persons (1983–1992) global committee and honorary chair of the Global Cooperation for a Better World Project, created to support the United Nations' International Year of Peace celebrations in 1986. Along with other heads of state, and women such as Benazir Bhutto, Barbara Bush, and Princess Françoise Lobkowicz, Pérez de Cuéllar received the Together for Peace award at a celebration held at the UN in 1989. After the ratification of the Convention on the Elimination of All Forms of Discrimination Against Women in 1981, and establishment of UNIFEM as an autonomous organization within the UN Development Programme in 1985, the UNIFEM Goodwill Ambassador position was launched to bring visibility to the convention and its goals. Appointed in 1988, the first two ambassadors were Pérez de Cuéllar and Phoebe Muga Asiyo, a former Kenyan representative of the UN. Pérez de Cuéllar represented and spoke on behalf of the United Nations at the dedication of the Strawberry Fields Memorial to John Lennon in New York City's Central Park in 1985. She spoke again on behalf of the United Nations and greeted Lennon's spouse Yoko Ono in the 1990 ceremony, when Imagine was broadcast as a peace tribute world-wide in honor of what would have been the singer's 50th birthday.

=== Later years (1991–2012) ===
After retiring in 1991 from the United Nations, the couple returned to Peru. In 1995, Javier unsuccessfully ran for President of Peru, but served from 2000 to 2001 as the country's Prime Minister. At the end of his term, he was posted as Peru's ambassador to France, and the couple lived in Paris until 2004. Pérez de Cuéllar began working with the World Monuments Fund in Europe to preserve the architectural heritage of Peru. Organizing a trip for the European WMF president Bertrand du Vignaud and other supporters in 2001, she proposed that they visit colonial churches from the Inca era between Cuzco and the archaeological site at Pikillaqta. She became the inaugural president of the Peruvian branch of the World Monument Fund in 2010 and was tasked with spearheading eight restoration projects as well as fundraising. Among the projects she sponsored were the restoration of the Andean Baroque style Saint John the Baptist Church in Huaro and Saint Peter the Apostle Church in Andahuaylillas. A critical component in the restoration projects involved educating the local population about the importance of preserving their cultural heritage. In 2011, Pérez de Cuéllar was the inaugural recipient of the World Monument Fund's "Watch Award". The award's name refers to the "Watch List", a biennial report which itemizes at risk architectural and archeological sites.

== Death and legacy ==
Pérez de Cuéllar died on 1 July 2013, in Brussels, Belgium, while visiting family. She was remembered at the time for her service to the United Nations as an elegant and gracious hostess, and advisor to her husband, in addition to her global efforts on cultural and historic preservation. A collection of folk art she had acquired over the years was donated to the Canadian Museum of Civilization in 1990. Pérez de Cuéllar chose the location because of Canada's humanitarian support for developing nations and international culture and noted that the intent was to have the collection represent one item from each member-country of the United Nations.
