= Lucre District, Quispicanchi =

Coordinates: 13.6386°S 71.7407°W

Lucre
- District
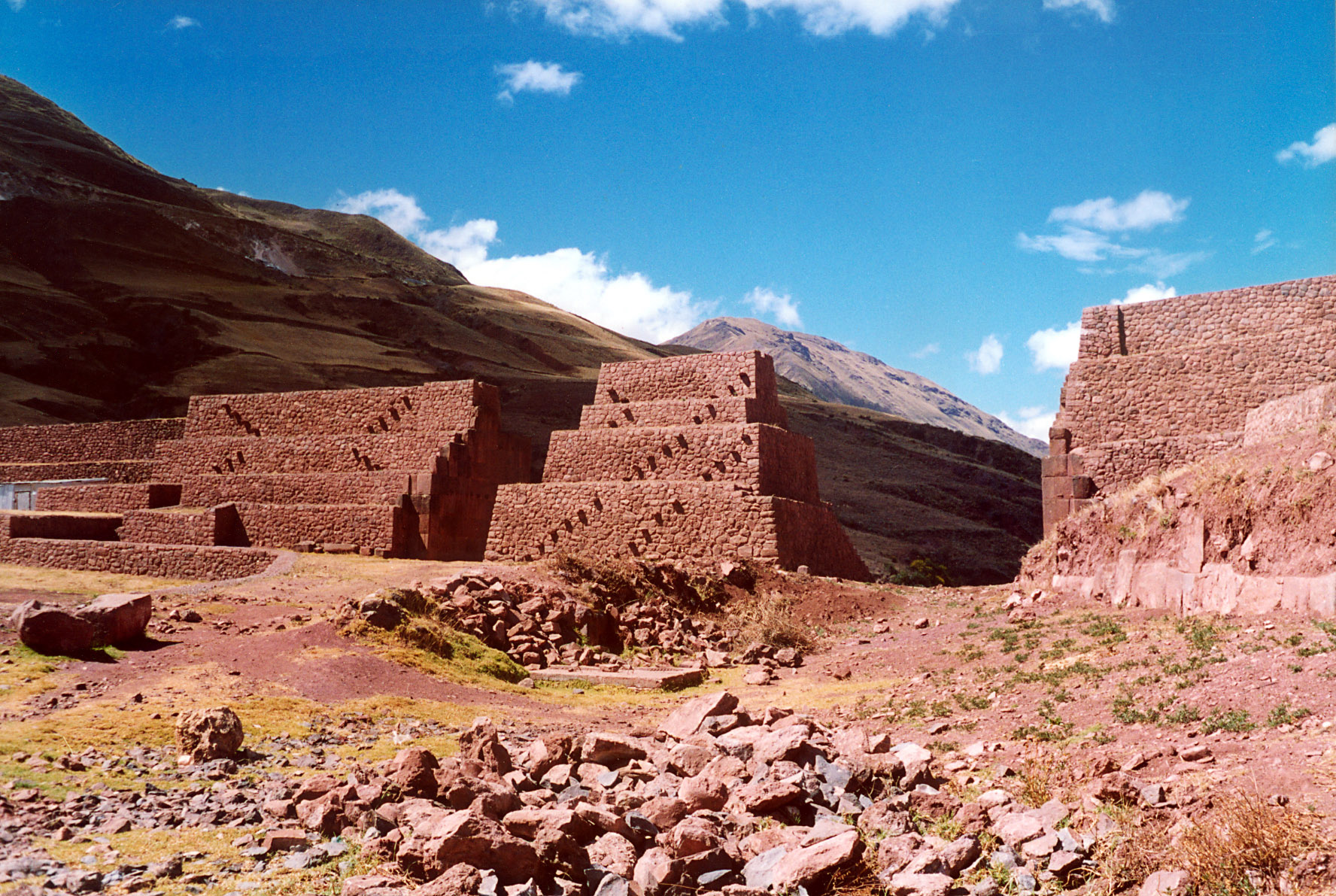
- Rumiqullqa
- Interactive map of Lucre
- Country: Peru
- Region: Cusco
- Province: Quispicanchi
- Founded: January 17, 1941
- Capital: Lucre

Area
  - Total: 118.78 km^{2} (45.86 sq mi)
- Elevation: 3,086 m (10,125 ft)

Population (2005 census)
  - Total: 4,040
  - Density: 34.0/km^{2} (88.1/sq mi)
- Time zone: UTC-5 (PET)
- UBIGEO: 081208

The Lucre District is one of the twelve districts in the Quispicanchi Province in Peru. Created by Law No. 9295 on January 17, 1941, its capital is the town of Lucre.

== Geography ==
One of the highest peaks of the district is Qusqu Qhawarina at 4,145 m (13,599 ft). Other mountains are listed below:

- Ch'illka Muqu
- Chiwakuyuq
- Ch'aki Qucha
- Kampanayuq
- Kumpayuq
- Kuntur Sayana
- Luychu
- Patu Qucha
- Puka Q'asa
- Quri Qalla
- Quriwayrachina
- Saywa
- Sinchi Q'umirniyuq
- Suysunayuq
- Tarachayuq
- Tuqtu Wampa
- Yuthu Pallana

== Ethnic groups ==
The people in the district are mainly indigenous citizens of Quechua descent. Quechua is the language which the majority of the population (57.36%) learnt to speak in childhood, 42.31% of the residents started speaking using the Spanish language (2007 Peru Census).

== See also ==
- Chuqi Pukyu
- Pikillaqta
- Rumiqullqa
