= Huaro District =

Huaro Waru
- District
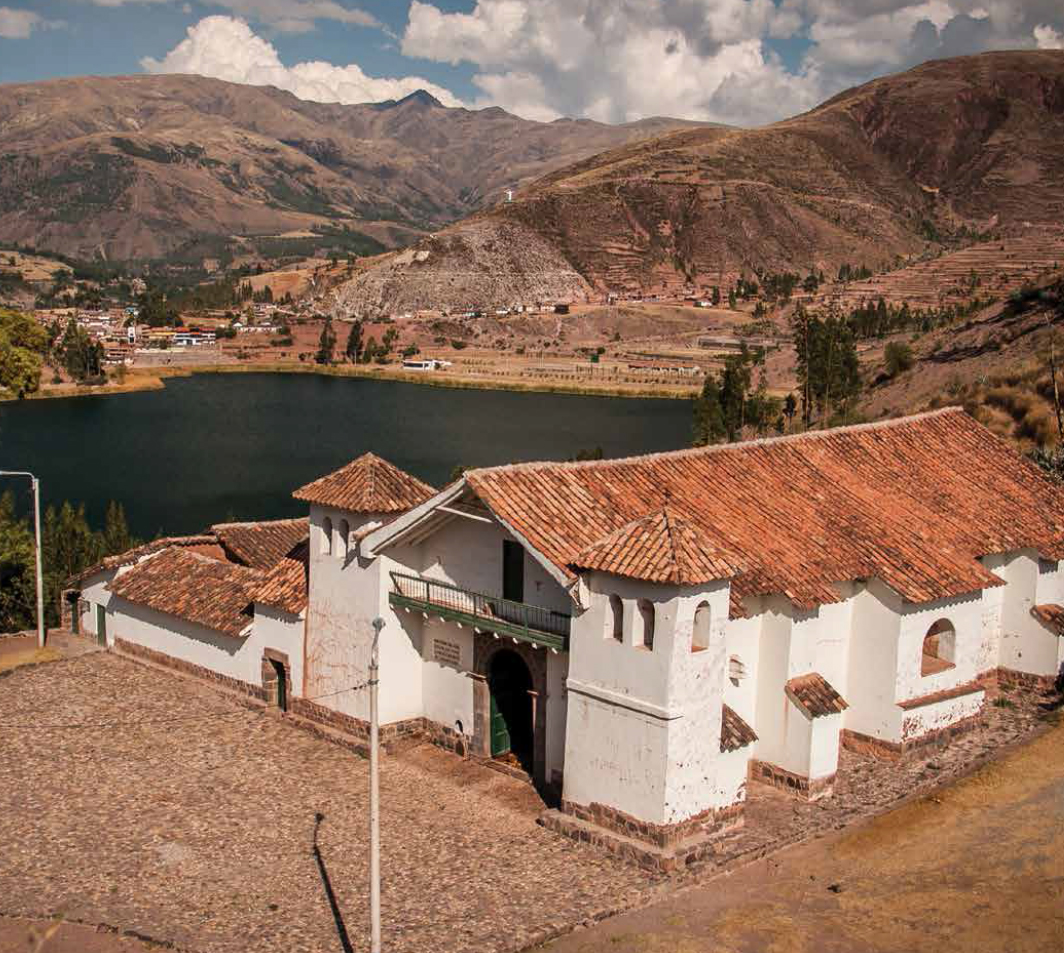
- Chapel of la Virgen Purificada de Canincunca.
- Interactive map of Huaro
- Country: Peru
- Region: Cusco
- Province: Quispicanchi
- Founded: September 26, 1952
- Capital: Huaro

Government
  - Mayor: Julián Condori Puma

Area
  - Total: 106.28 km^{2} (41.03 sq mi)
- Elevation: 3,157 m (10,358 ft)

Population (2005 census)
  - Total: 4,587
  - Density: 43.16/km^{2} (111.8/sq mi)
- Time zone: UTC-5 (PET)
- UBIGEO: 081207

The Huaro District is one of the twelve districts in the Quispicanchi Province in Peru. Created by Law No. 11863 on September 26, 1952, its capital is the town of Huaro.

== Geography ==
One of the highest peaks of the district is Khuchiyuq at approximately 4,600 m (15,100 ft). Other mountains are listed below:

- Apu Waylla Q'asa
- Kuntur Sayana
- Mit'a Mit'a
- Puka Punta
- Qullpani
- Q'illu Rumiyuq
- Willka
- Wiraqucha

== Ethnic groups ==
The people in the district are mainly indigenous citizens of Quechua descent. Quechua is the language which the majority of the population (56.81%) learnt to speak in childhood, 42.90% of the residents started speaking using the Spanish language (2007 Peru Census).

== See also ==
- Andean Baroque Route
