= Ana Paula dos Santos =

First lady of Angola from 1991 to 2017

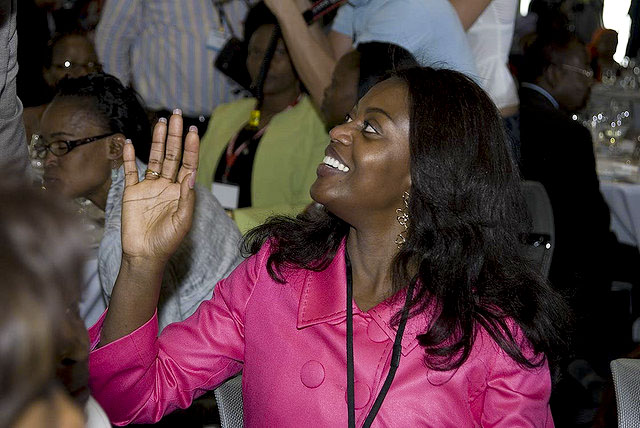

First Lady of Angola
- In office 17 May 1991 – 26 September 2017
- President: José Eduardo dos Santos
- Preceded by: Tatiana Kukanova
- Succeeded by: Ana Dias Lourenço

Personal details
- Born: Ana Paula Cristovão Lemos; 17 October 1963 (age 62) Luanda, Angola
- Party: Popular Movement for the Liberation of Angola
- Spouse: José Eduardo dos Santos (m. 1991; died 2022)
- Children: Eduane Danilo dos Santos (born 1991); Joseana dos Santos (born 1995); Eduardo Breno dos Santos (born 1998)
- Education: Agostinho Neto University

Ana Paula Cristovão Lemos dos Santos ([ˈɐnɐ ˈpawlɐ ðuʃ ˈsɐ̃tuʃ]; born 17 October 1963) is the widow of former president of Angola, José Eduardo dos Santos. She was Angola's First lady from 1991 to 2017.

== Early life and education ==
Ana Paula Cristovão Lemos dos Santos was born in Luanda, Angola in 1963. She was a fashion model and air hostess on the Angolan presidential aircraft, when she met her future husband José Eduardo dos Santos during the time she was working on presidential flights.

== Career ==
Between 1990 and 1994, she completed a state teacher training at the National Institute of Education, Luanda. Later she completed a course of law at the Faculty of Law of the Agostinho Neto University. She was Angola's First lady from 1991 to 2017.

== Personal life ==
Cristovão Lemos married José Eduardo dos Santos on 17 May 1991 and is mother of three children, Eduane Danilo dos Santos (born 29 September 1991), Joseana dos Santos (born 5 April 1995) and Eduardo Breno dos Santos (born 2 October 1998).

A diplomat described the president and first lady as: "a handsome couple, elegantly and expensively dressed, looking for all the world as though they're living in southern California." In 1997, Ana Paula undiplomatically announced that her five-year-old son would enroll at the Portuguese school in Luanda because of the "bad quality" of state education (for which many hold her husband responsible). She has also tried to make her presence felt in administrative matters; a move which has irritated the political mainstream. Also under fire are her business interests, particularly diamonds.

Dos Santos is a patron of the Committee to support rural women (COMUR), supporting with micro-credit funds. She represented her country at the Micro-credit Summit for Heads of States and Governments in Washington, D.C., in 1997.

Dos Santos supports landmine victims. She founded the Lwini Foundation for social solidarity which is dedicated to the support of civilians, particularly women and children.
