= Ruth Lara =

Portuguese-Angolan mathematician, translator, and activist

First Lady of Angola (interim)
- In office 11 September 1979 – 20 September 1979
- President: Lúcio Lara
- Preceded by: Maria Eugénia Neto
- Succeeded by: Tatiana Kukanova

Personal details
- Born: Ruth Manuela Pflüger Rosenberg Lara; 17 September 1936 Lisbon, Portugal
- Died: 25 October 2000 (aged 64) Luanda, Angola
- Spouse: Lúcio Lara
- Children: 9
- Occupation: educator; activist; mathematician; translator

Ruth Manuela Pflüger Rosenberg Lara (17 September 1936 – 25 October 2000) was a Portuguese Angolan educator, mathematician, translator, and activist. She was the First Lady of Angola briefly, after her husband, the physicist-mathematician, anti-colonial revolutionary, and politician, Lúcio Lara, took office for 9 days on an interim basis after the death of Agostinho Neto.

She developed one of the first literacy manuals made by Angolans, along with having been responsible, alongside her husband, for their historic documents on the process of Angolan decolonization during the Angolan War of Independence.

== Biography ==
Lara was born to German parents Lotte and Hermann Pflüger in Lisbon on 17 September 1936. Her parents were persecuted by Nazi Germany and had taken refuge in Lisbon, due to Lotte being Jewish and Hermann being a Communist militant. Her parents continued to be active in leftist activism while in Portugal, which influenced their children's political beliefs.

As a secondary school student at Lycée Français de Lisboa, she became a movement of the Youth wing of the Movement of Democratic Unity and began to protest against the Estado Novo regime of António Salazar. She also became a member of groups linked to composer and Communist activist Fernando Lopes-Graça until 1953. It was during this time that she also met Angolan student Lúcio Lara, already an important leader in the anti-colonial movement in Angola.

Beginning in 1953, Ruth began dating Lúcio, marrying him in July 1955. Their first child, Paulo, was born in Lisbon in 1956. During this period, she began her studies in Mathematics. The couple became godparents during the marriage of Agostinho Neto and Maria Eugénia Neto when they married in 1958.

The Laras later discovered that they were being monitored by the Estado Novo regime's secret police, the Polícia Internacional e de Defesa do Estado (PIDE). They then decided to leave Lisbon in March 1959 to West Germany. The couple proceeded to move afterwards to East Germany, receiving asylum and support from Ruth's family, the Pflügers and the Rosenbergs. At this point, Lúcio was able throw off the secret police, going to, among other places such as Rome, Tunis, Rabat, and Casablanca, while Ruth stayed in East Germany.

After Lúcio was able to establish himself in Casablanca, Ruth travelled via France to Morocco to meet her husband. From there, the family went to Conakry, where Lúcio would head the first international office of the People's Movement for the Liberation of Angola (MPLA) in Africa. While there, he worked as a French professor. He also organized the first guiding documents of anti-colonial struggles in the former Portuguese colonies, working with Hugo de Menezes, Salette de Menezes, Mário Pinto de Andrade, Amílcar Cabral, Viriato da Cruz, Eugénia Cruz, Eduardo dos Santos, Judith Mariazinha, Américo Boavida, Conceição Boavida, Gentil Ferreira Viana, and Marcelino dos Santos. The couple's second child, Wanda Lara, was born in Conakry in 1963.

That year, Ruth left for Kinshasa with her husband to establish themselves there, where Lúcio worked at the party's headquarters. They later moved with the entirety of the MPLA to Brazzaville to reestablish the party headquarters. Their third child and last biological child, Bruno Lara, was born there. Ruth went on to work as a math professor at Liceu Mafua-Virgile de Brazavile. In 1960, the Laras adopted three children from Brazzaville: José da Silva Lara, Júnior Cadete Lara, and Jean-Michel Mabeko-Tali Lara. They would also later adopt three Angolan children: José Katuya Lara (who was given the nickname Vantagem Lara), Catarina Lara (Valia Lara), and Paulo Samba Lara.

Ruth's importance grew in the MPLA beginning in 1964 and 1965, where she became one of the party's translators, as well as being an important educator when, with Guida Chipenda, they created the first literacy manual created by Angolans.

At the end of 1974, the party became known for having Lúcio participate in diplomatic negotiations on Angola's independence, taking part in the historic first delegation of the MPLA that was officially received in Luanda. He served in these positions until Angola's independence in 1975. On Angola's independence day, with Henrique Onambwé, Joaquina, and Cici Cabral, Ruth helped to create the Angolan flag.

After independence, Agostinho Neto assigned her to various activities linked to political education linked to the Angolan state, later designating her, in 1979, the chief of the Staff Training Department of the MPLA. She also played a role in the program to send Angolan students overseas. She ultimately saw, that same year, her husband led the country and become interim president of Angola after Agostinho Neto's death.

As head of the Staff Training department, she started to come into conflict with the new president of Angola, José Eduardo dos Santos, in 1982 for authorizing the preparation and presentation of a mandatory satirical piece she directed at Santos, dubbed the "caso da Peça e do Quadro". She was later stripped of her party duties, but would later reenter the MPLA afterwards.

She would later work as a translator and at an organization dedicated to the historic documentation of the process of Angolan decolonization. She founded, with her husband Lúcio, the Associação Tchiweka de Documentação (ATD). She dedicated herself to these activities until her death.

== Death ==
Lara died of cancer on 25 October 2000 in Luanda.
