= Ana Dias Lourenço =

Angolan politician

Ana Afonso Dias Lourenço GCIH
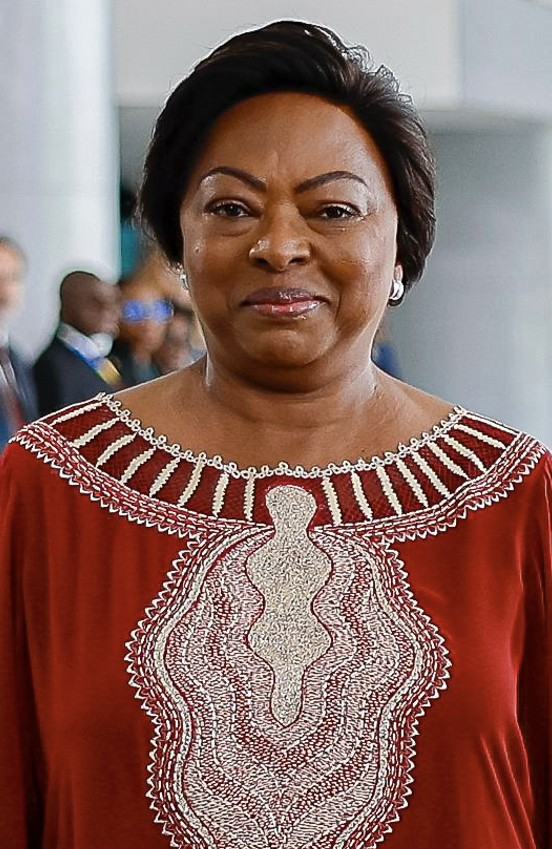
- Dias Lourenço in 2025

First Lady of Angola
- Incumbent
- Assumed office 26 September 2017
- President: João Lourenço
- Preceded by: Ana Paula dos Santos

Minister of Planning of Angola
- In office 1999–2012
- President: José Eduardo dos Santos
- Succeeded by: Job Graça

Chairperson of the Southern African Development Community
- In office 30 September 2006 – 200?

Personal details
- Born: Ana Afonso Dias; 13 April 1957 (age 68) Luanda, Portuguese Angola
- Party: MPLA
- Spouse: João Lourenço
- Children: 6

Ana Afonso Dias Lourenço, GCIH (born 13 April 1957) is an Angolan economist, politician and former government minister. She has served as the First Lady of Angola since September 2017 as the wife of President João Lourenço.

== Early and personal life ==
Lourenco was born on 13 April 1957 in Luanda in Angola. She had her primary education in Primary School No. 83 in Luanda from 1962 to 1966. She attended Preparatory School Marta Rescue Salazar, Luanda from 1966 to 1968. She attended General Course of High Schools and High School Dona Guiomar of Lancaster Luanda from 1968 to 1974. She completed her Degree in Economics (Planning) in the University of Angola in Luanda from 1979 to 1983. She completed her course on Analysis Course and Project Evaluation by African Development Bank Abidjan in Côte d'Ivoire in 1984 and a course on Macroeconomic Policy Management Institute World Bank Economic development (IDE), in Portugal during 1992. Lourenco completed her graduation from the University of Agostinho Neto in Angola and also has a certificate in Macroeconomic Policy and Management.

Lourenço is multilingual: in addition to Portuguese, she speaks English, French and Spanish. She is the mother of six children.

== Career ==
She served in various capacities as the President of the National Council of Statistics, President of SADC's National Commission, National Coordinator of the FED Fund, Angola's Governor for the World Bank and African Development Bank and Member of the Government's Economic Cabinet. She was the Senior Advisor to Provincial Planning Cabinet, Benguela, Angola, Head of Investments Department, Ministry of Planning of Angola from 1986 – 1997 and the National Director of the Investment Department. Lourenco was the Vice Minister and Minister of Planning of Angola from 1997 to 2012. She served as the Vice Chairman of the Board's Ethics Committee and on the Human Resources Committee between 2014 and 2015. Lourenco served as an Executive Director at the Board of the World Bank Group. As the head of Ministry of Planning Investment, she was responsible for the development programs of Benguela Province. Between 1997 and 1999 she served as Planning deputy minister and was twice president of the Council of Ministers of SADC. As the Governor of Angola to the World Bank and national coordinator of EDF funds.

Lourenço has been in the Ministry of Planning since 1997, first as Deputy Minister of Planning from 1997 to 1999 and national Minister of Planning from 1999 to 2012. Since September 30, 2006, she has been the chairperson of the Southern African Development Community. Lourenço was the sixth candidate on the MPLA's national list in the September 2008 parliamentary election. She won a seat in the election.

== Honours ==
=== Foreign Honours ===
- Spain:
  - Dame Grand Cross of the Order of Civil Merit (31 January 2023)
- Portugal:
  - Dame Grand Cross of the Order of Prince Henry (22 November 2018)
