= Wiraqucha (Cusco) =

Archaeological site in Peru

- Location within Peru

Highest point
- Elevation: 3,600 m (11,800 ft)
- Coordinates: 13°40′10″S 71°38′40″W

Geography
- Location: Peru, Cusco Region
- Parent range: Andes

Wiraqucha or Huiracocha (also spelled Wiraquchan or Huirajochan, see Viracocha#Etymology for etymology) is a mountain in the Andes of Peru, about 3,600 metres (11,811 ft) high. It is situated in the Cusco Region, Quispicanchi Province, in the districts Andahuaylillas, Huaro and Urcos, south-east of the higher mountain named Quri and north-west of Huaro (Waru). The Willkanuta River flows along the mountain. The lake Quyllur Urmana lies at its feet.

On top of Wiraqucha there is a pair of rocks which resemble two toads, one of them looking at "Apu" Ausangate and the other one looking at "Apu" Pachatusan. This pair, known as Wak'a Los Sapos de Wiraqucha (Spanish los sapos de the toads of), has been considered a wak'a by the local people.
