= Rumicolca =

Archaeological site in Peru

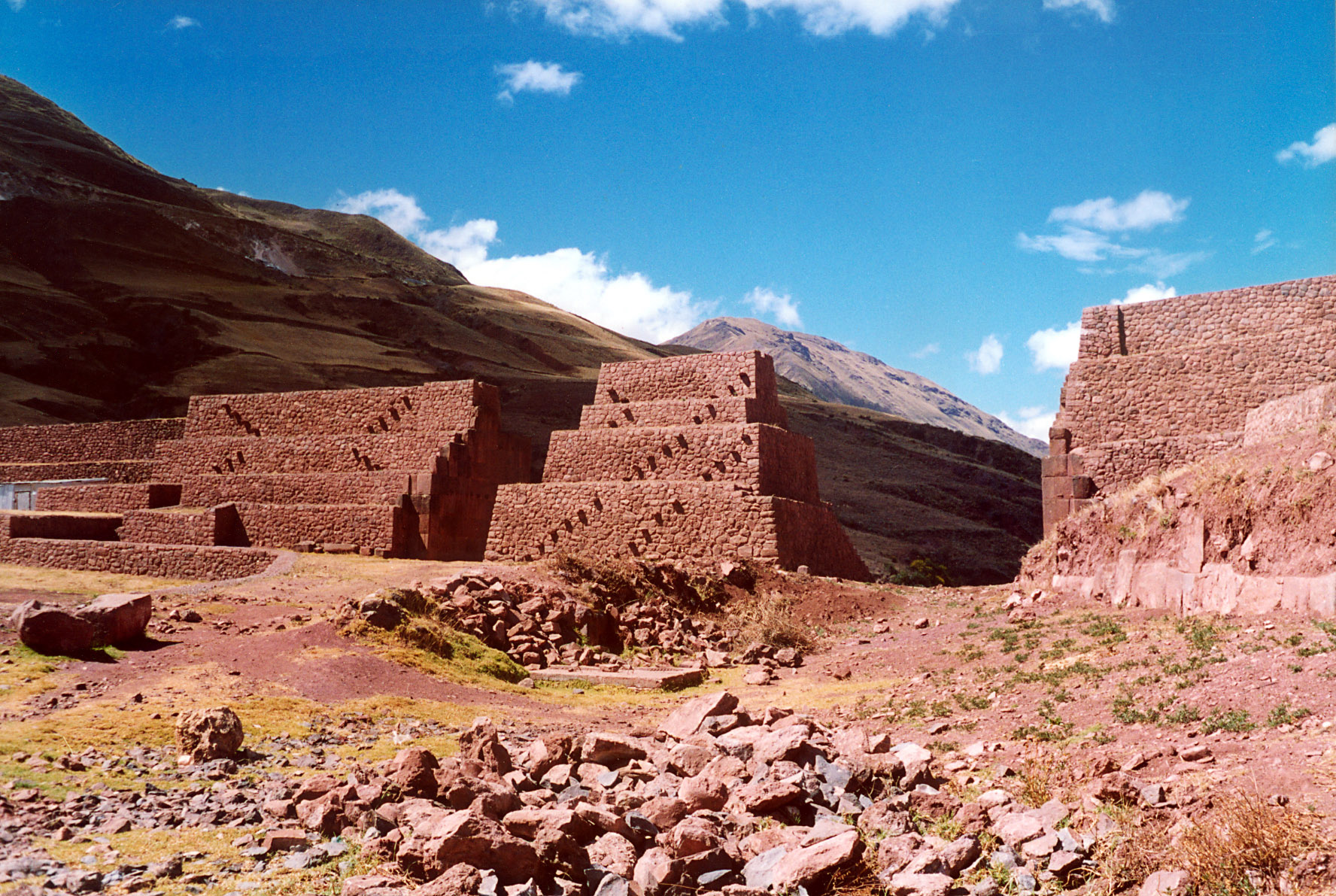
- View of Rumicolca

- Location within Peru
- 13°37′05″S 71°42′26″W
- Location: Lucre District, Quispicanchi Province, Cusco Region, Peru
- Region: Andes

Rumicolca (possibly from Quechua rumi stone, qullqa, qulqa deposit, storehouse) is an archaeological site in Peru. It is located in the Cusco Region, Quispicanchi Province, Lucre District. Rumicolca is situated near the archaeological sites Chuqi Pukyu and Pikillaqta, east of Lake Huacarpay.

== Theories on the origin of the Rumiqullqa Gate ==
Folklore

One story in Cusco folklore goes as follows: The Wari people once inhabited the city of Pikillaqta. The Wari were a pre-Inca civilization that existed from about 550 to 900 A.D., and they are known as the first state level society in the Sierra region of Peru. They were also the first to urbanize, and at Pikillaqta, this created a substantial need for a steady and large supply of water. One of the great Wari leaders decided to solve this problem by creating a competition. He offered his only daughters hand in marriage to the man who could bring water to Pikillaqta. Two men wished to marry his daughter-one from Cusco and one from Puno-and so they both began to create plans for a way to bring water to the city. In the end, the man from Cusco decided to build a great canal from the Laguna de Huacarpay to Pikillaqta. In order to do this, he needed to cross a large gap, and so he built the first and largest aqueduct in ancient Peru, which still stands today. This is La Portada de Rumicolca.

The Gate Theory

This first theory held that La Portada was originally built by the Wari to serve as a gate to their area of rule. Later, the Inca built a larger gate on top of the old Wari foundations. This gate was meant to separate the four “suyus,” or regions, of the Inca Empire. Specifically, La Portada was the gate between the northern region of Cusco and the southern region of Puno. Since it was on the main highway between these two regions, travelers would have to pass through the gate and pay a toll to the Inca. This theory suggests that the Inca also modified La Portada to serve as an aqueduct. This theory likely attempted to explain the fact that much of La Portada is made up of crude Wari stonework, encased by finely carved Inca stone veneer.

The Aqueduct Theory

The most current theory suggests that La Portada was originally built as an aqueduct by the Wari, just as told in the Cusco legend above. The Inca later adopted the site as part of their Empire, and made improvements to the structure. This is the most likely explanation, as the paleohydrologist Kenneth Wright states that the original structure is certainly of the Wari type, and the canal running along La Portada does not appear to be a retrofit, but part of the original structure. This theory does not address whether it served as a gate or not, but since it is located on the main road from Cusco, it is likely that travelers would have passed through it. In fact, the entire purpose of building the aqueduct may have been in order to provide water to Pikillaqta without interrupting the flow of traffic along the road.

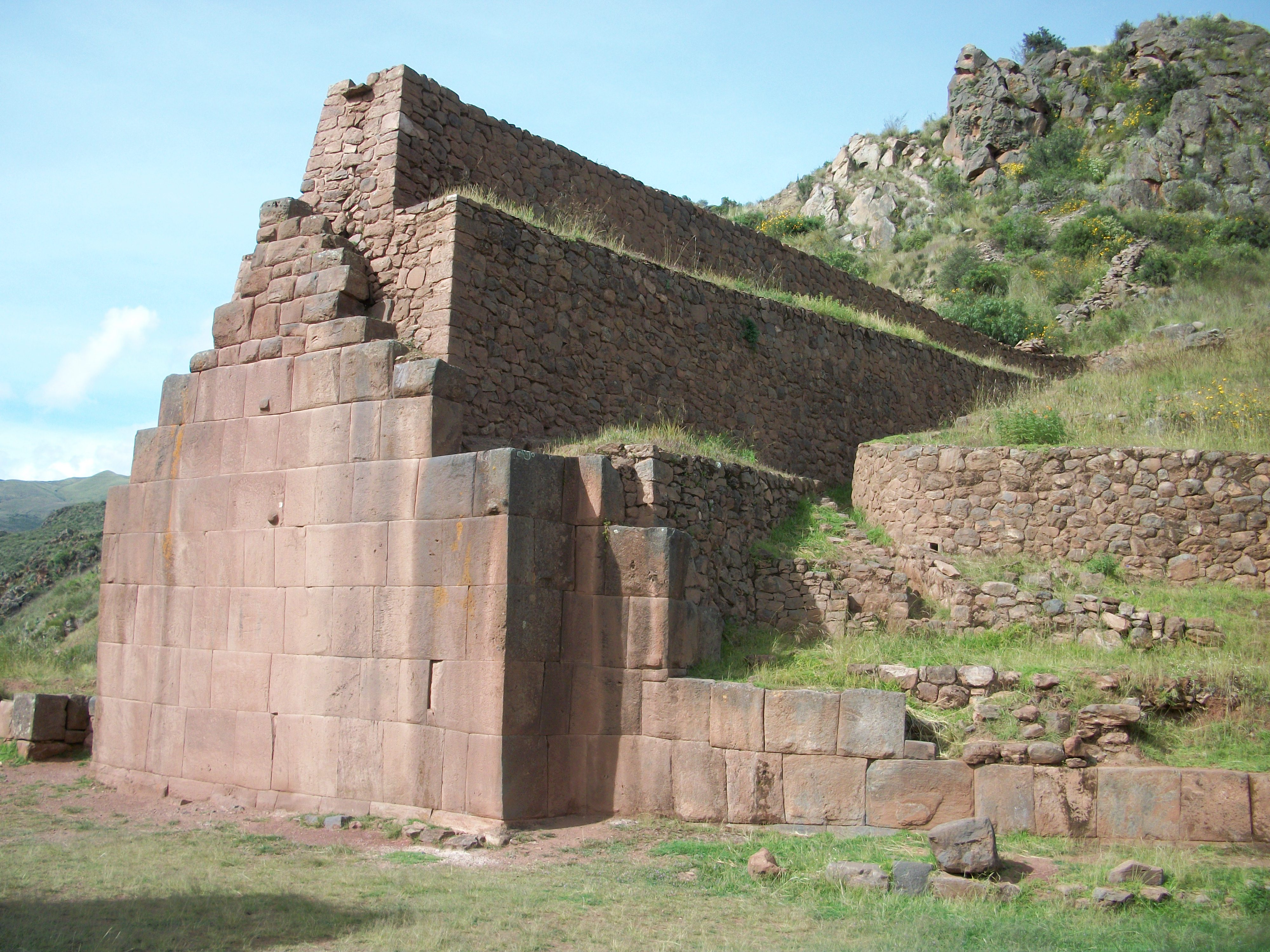
A view of the Inca stone veneer over Wari stonework and the aqueduct channel at La Portada de Rumicolca.
