= Choquepuquio =

Archaeological site in Peru

- Interactive map of Choquepuquio
- Cultures: Wari
- Location: Huacarpay, Quispicanchi Province, Cusco Region, Peru
- Region: Andes

History
- Built: Approximately 400 CE
- Abandoned: Approximately 1530 CE

Choquepuquio (possibly from Quechua chuqi metal, gold (Aymara), every kind of precious metal, pukyu spring, well) is an ancient Wari site in Peru in the valley of Cusco. These extensive ruins are situated in the Quispicanchi Province, Lucre District, near the village of Huacarpay and the homonymous lake.

The site dates back to c. 400 CE and lasted into the Colonial Period before its abandonment around 1530 CE.

== See also ==
- Pikillaqta
- Rumiqullqa
