= Qusqu Qhawarina (Quispicanchi) =

Mountain in Peru

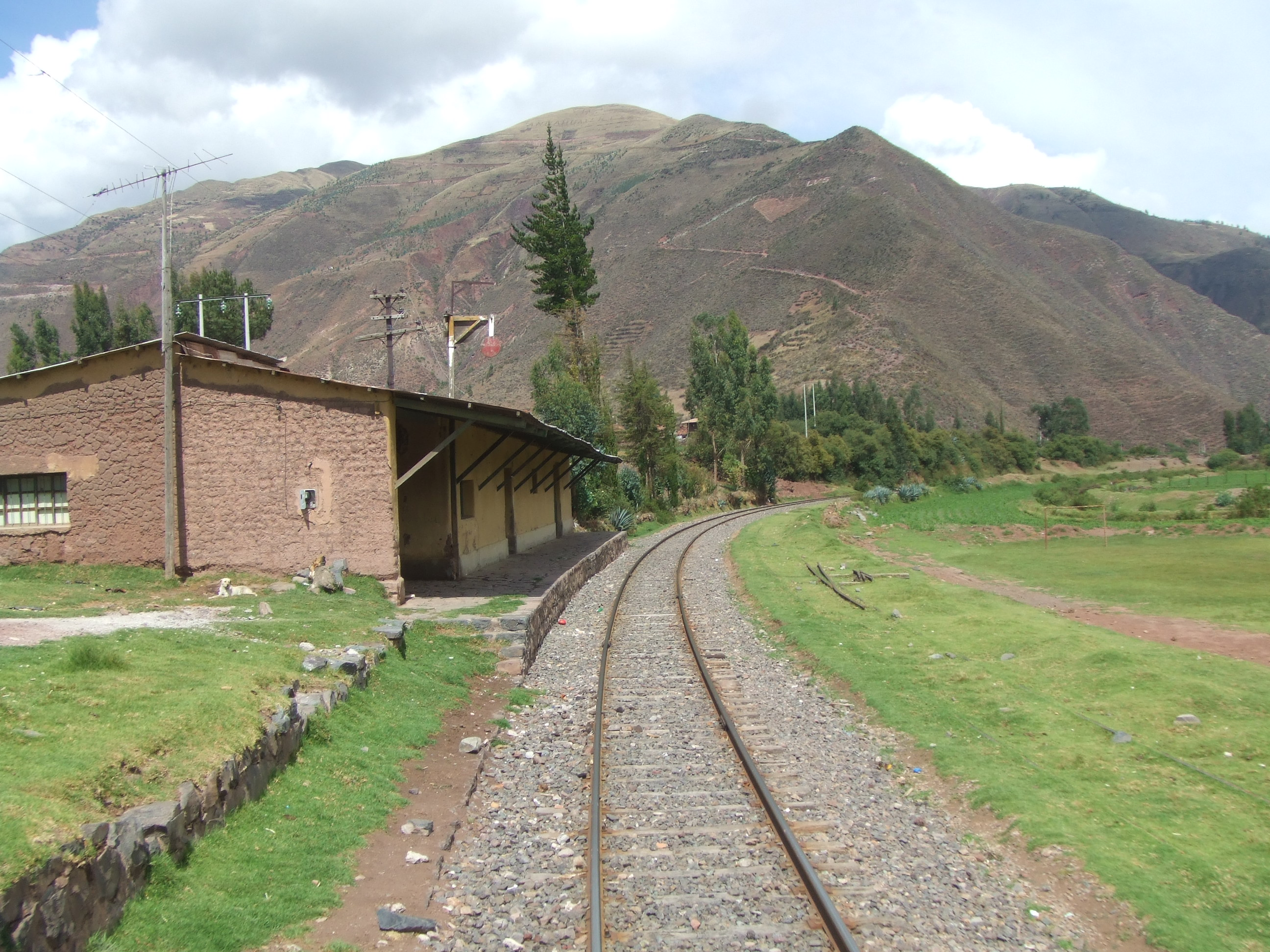
- Qusqu Qhawarina as seen from the Willkanuta valley

Highest point
- Elevation: 4,145 m (13,599 ft)5295
- Coordinates: 13°39′59″S 71°43′15″W

Naming
- Language of name: Quechua

Geography
- Location within Peru
- Location: Peru, Cusco Region, Quispicanchi Province
- Parent range: Andes

Qusqu Qhawarina (Quechua qusqu boundary stone; nucleus; navel; heap of earth and stones; bed, dry bed of a lake, Qusqu Cusco (a city), qhawarina, qhawana viewpoint, here translated to "boundary stone viewpoint", Hispanicized spelling Cusco Jahuarina) is a 4,145-metre-high (13,599 ft) mountain in the Cusco Region in Peru. It is situated in the Quispicanchi Province, on the border of the districts of Andahuaylillas and Lucre. Qusqu Qhawarina lies on the left bank of the Willkanuta River, northeast of a mountain named Saywa (Quechua for boundary stone, landmark).
