= Quyllur Urmana =

Peruvian lake

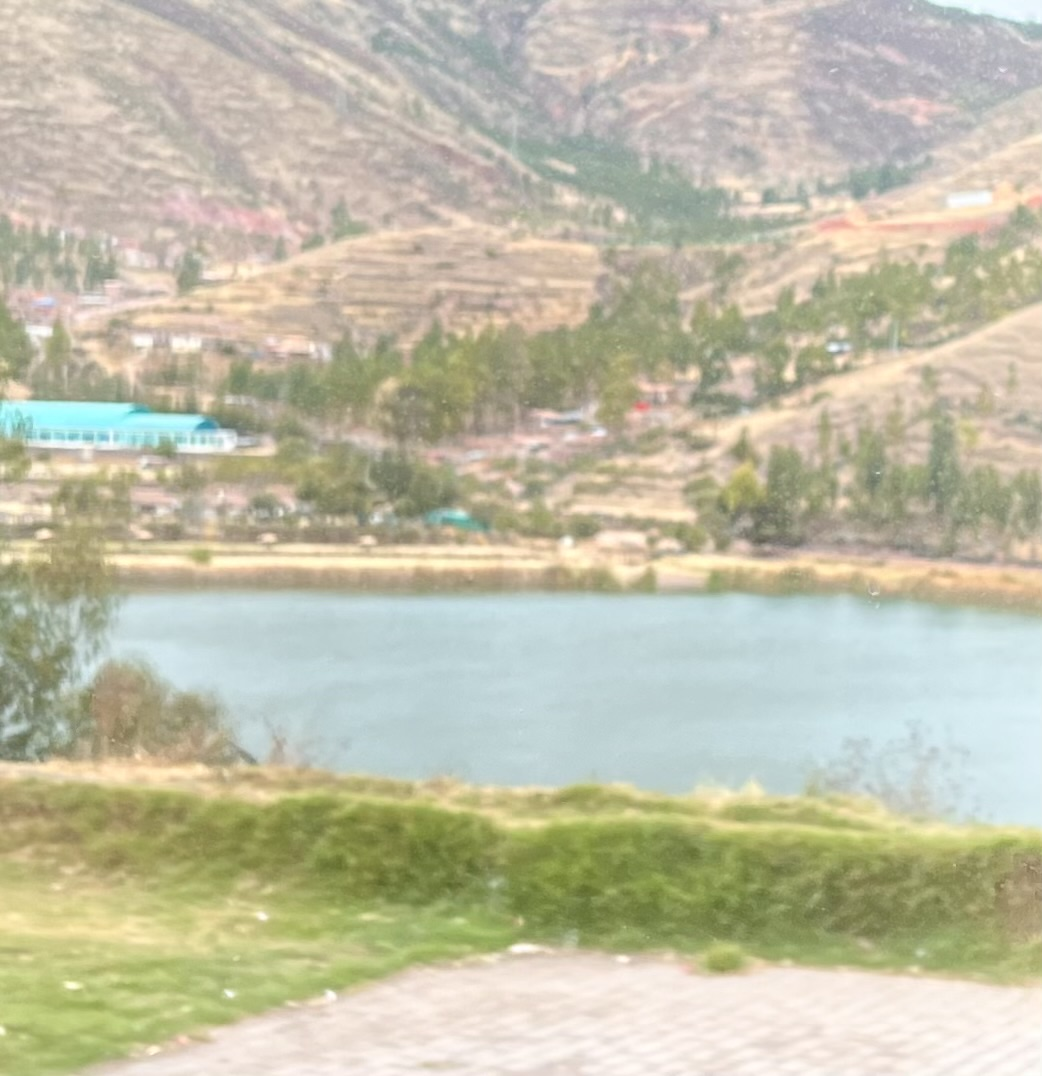

- Location within Peru
- Location: Peru; Cusco Region, Urubamba Province
- Coordinates: 13°41′20″S 71°37′50″W

Quyllur Urmana (Quechua quyllur star, urmana trap / urmay to fall, -na a suffix, Hispanicized and mixed spellings Coyllor Urmana, Qoillur Urmana, Qoyllor Urmana, Qoyllur Urmana) is a lake in Peru located in the Cusco Region, Quispicanchi Province, Urcos District. It lies west of Willkanuta River, between the towns Huaro (Waru) and Urcos, at the foot of the mountain Wiraqucha.
