= First Lady of Angola =

Title of the spouse of the president of Angola

- Primera-dama de Angola

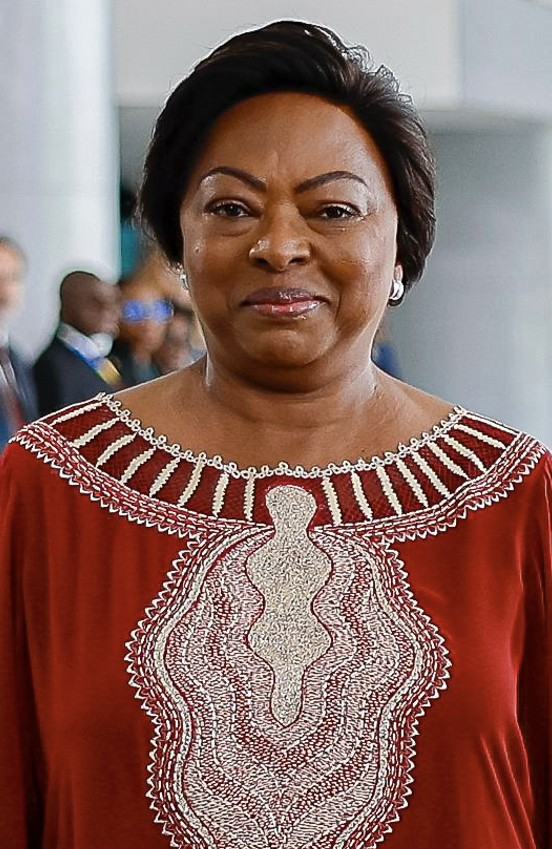
- Incumbent; Ana Dias Lourenço since 26 September 2017
- Style: Her Excellency
- Residence: Presidential Palace, Luanda
- Appointer: President of Angola
- Inaugural holder: Maria Eugénia Neto
- Formation: 11 November 1975
- Website: www.governo.gov.ao

The First Lady of Angola (Portuguese: Primeira-dama de Angola) is the title held by the wife of the President of Angola. The role of the First Lady has evolved over time, and it now includes a range of activities such as involvement in political campaigns, management of the presidential residence, advocacy for social causes, and representation of the President at official events.

Ana Dias Lourenço is the current First Lady of Angola, having assumed the position on 26 September 2017, when her husband João Lourenço became president. In many countries, the role of the First Lady is seen as an important and influential position, and first ladies often continue to be in the public eye and have influence in various sectors even after their husband's term of office has ended.

In Angola, the role of the First Lady has also evolved over time, from being primarily a ceremonial figure to having a more active role in championing social causes and supporting the President's political agenda. The First Lady often accompanies the President on official trips and represents Angola at various national and international events. The position of the First Lady also carries a degree of influence and visibility in the country, and their activities and initiatives are often closely followed by the public and media. In the absence of a First Lady, the President may be accompanied by a female relative or an official representative.

== History ==
The first person to hold the title of First Lady of Angola was Maria Eugénia Neto, the wife of Agostinho Neto, who became the first president of Angola after its independence from Portugal in 1975. She was a poet and a political activist who supported her husband's struggle for liberation. She worked with the Organization of Angolan Women (OMA) from 1968, which aimed to mobilize women for the independence movement and social development. She remained First Lady until her death in 1979.

The second First Lady was Tatiana Kukanova, a Soviet citizen who married José Eduardo dos Santos in 1970. She met him when he was studying in Azerbaijan and followed him to Angola after its independence. She was a teacher and a translator who spoke several languages. She also supported various social causes, such as education, health and women's rights. She divorced dos Santos in 1984 and returned to Azerbaijan with their daughter Isabel dos Santos, who later became Africa's richest woman.

The third First Lady was Ana Paula dos Santos, a former fashion model and air hostess who married dos Santos in 1991. She served as First Lady for 26 years, making her the longest-serving holder of the title. She completed a course of law at the Agostinho Neto University and was involved in several charitable and humanitarian initiatives. She founded the Lwini Foundation for social solidarity, which supports landmine victims, women and children. She also represented Angola at various international events, such as the Micro-credit Summit for Heads of States and Governments in Washington, D.C., in 1997.

The fourth and current First Lady is Ana Dias Lourenço, an economist, politician and former government minister who married João Lourenço in 1989. She has a degree in economics from Agostinho Neto University and a certificate in macroeconomic policy and management. She served as the Minister of Planning of Angola from 1999 to 2012 and as an executive director at the board of the World Bank Group from 2014 to 2016. She also held various positions as the President of the National Council of Statistics, President of SADC's National Commission, National Coordinator of the FED Fund, Angola's Governor for the World Bank and African Development Bank and Member of the Government's Economic Cabinet. She became First Lady in 2017 when her husband was elected president.

== List of First Ladies ==
PresidencyNo.	Portrait	Name	Tenure	Age at tenure start	President (Spouse, unless noted)
1		Maria Eugénia Neto b. 8 March 1934	11 November 1975 – 10 September 1979	41 years, 244 days	Agostinho Neto In office: 1975–1979
Interim		Ruth Lara b. 17 September 1936 d. 25 October 2000	11 September 1979 — 20 September 1979	42 years, 359 days	Lúcio Lara In office: 1979
2		Tatiana Kukanova b. Unknown	21 September 1979 – 1980	Unknown	José Eduardo dos Santos In office: 1979–2017
Vacant		Vacant	1980 – 1991	Vacant	José Eduardo dos Santos In office: 1979–2017
3		Ana Paula dos Santos b. 23 May 1963	17 May 1991 – 25 September 2017	27 years, 210 days	José Eduardo dos Santos In office: 1979–2017
4		Ana Dias Lourenço b. 17 February 1958	26 September 2017 – present	60 years, 154 days	João Lourenço In office: 2017–present
