= Maria Eugénia Neto =

Portuguese-Angolan writer (born 1934)

First Lady of Angola
- In office 11 November 1975 – 10 September 1979
- President: Agostinho Neto
- Preceded by: Office established
- Succeeded by: Ruth Lara (interim); Tatiana Kukanova

Personal details
- Born: Maria Eugénia da Silva; 8 March 1934 (age 92) Montalegre, Trás-os-Montes, Portugal
- Spouse: Agostinho Neto (m. 1957; died 1979)
- Occupation: Writer
- Nickname(s): Geni Neto, Geny Neto, Jenny Neto, Maria Eugénia da Silva Neto

Maria Eugénia "Jenny" da Silva Neto (born 8 March 1934) is a Portuguese Angolan writer. She was the inaugural First Lady of Angola from 1975 to 1979. Born in Montalegre, she was educated in Lisbon, studying languages and music. She met Angolan medical student Agostinho Neto in 1948 and ten years later the couple married. Because of his anti-colonial activities, he was jailed multiple times, causing the family to move to Angola, Portugal, Cape Verde and eventually in 1962 to orchestrate an escape on Moroccan passports to Léopoldville, now in the Democratic Republic of the Congo. In Léopoldville, he became the head of the Movimento Popular de Libertação de Angola (People's Movement for the Liberation of Angola, MPLA), but the following year, the family moved again to Brazzaville, when the MPLA was ousted. They relocated again to Dar es Salaam, Tanzania, in 1968, where Neto began working with the Organização das Mulheres de Angola (Organization of Angolan Women, OMA), publishing the organization's bulletins and writing radio broadcasts for the MPLA. She also began writing children's stories, but her works were not published at the time.

In 1975, Angola gained its independence from Portugal, Agostinho became President of Angola, and Neto became the inaugural First Lady of Angola. Besides serving as hostess of the nation, she was one of the founders of the Uniao dos Escritores Angolanos (Union of Angolan Writers) in 1975, and worked with foreign museums to recover Angolan records from abroad. She also began publishing her children's literature. Her book E nas florestas os bichos falaram (In the Forest the Animals Spoke, 1977) received the UNESCO honorary prize at the Leipzig Book Fair in 1978. According to the Union of Angolan Writers, this made her the first Angolan writer to gain international recognition.

After her husband's death in 1979, Neto focused on publishing his previously unpublished works and preserving his legacy. In addition to her own writing, she worked with other founders of the Children's Fund for Southern Africa to assist mothers and children in Southern Africa. She founded and became president of the Fondation Antonio Agostinho Neto (Antonio Agostinho Neto Foundation, FAAN) in 2007. Through the foundation, she pushed for completion of the Memorial Antonio Agostinho Neto in 2012. She has received numerous honors for her dedication to Angola's independence and for her writing, including Cape Verde's highest Honor, the Order of Amílcar Cabral in 2023, and the National Prize for Culture and Arts from the Union of Angolan Writers in 2011. In 2017, she was inducted into the Academia Angolana de Letras (Angolan Academy of Letters).

== Early life, education, and family ==
Maria Eugénia da Silva, known as "Jenny" (or Geni), was born on 8 March 1934, in Montalegre in the Trás-os-Montes region of Portugal, to Maria Amelia da Silva. She attended convent school for six years. Her family moved to Lisbon, where she attended the National Conservatory of Portugal. In 1948, she met Agostinho Neto, an Angolan medical student at the University of Lisbon, and who was involved in various literary and anti-colonial movements. Agostinho's activities resulted in several arrests but he continued to write poetry and engage in activities designed to create pride in Angola's culture and a desire for national independence. Da Silva became one of his close friends and began to explore the issues of racial discrimination and the political problems it created for Africans. She studied drawing, foreign languages and music, while Agostinho completed his medical degree. They married in Lisbon on 27 October 1958, the day Agostinho graduated. He started working as a pediatrics specialist at Hospital de Dona Estefânia and took a course on tropical medicine while Neto prepared for the birth of their first child, Mário Jorge, at the end of 1959. In December, the family relocated to Luanda and soon after, Agostinho opened a private practice and his wife worked there as his assistant. In July 1960, he was arrested by Polícia Internacional e de Defesa do Estado (International and State Defense Police, PIDE) for his political activism. Protests by his supporters outside his clinic were quelled by the police, and to prevent further problems, Agostinho was returned to Portugal to be imprisoned.

Agostinho was exiled to Cape Verde in October, but Neto did not accompany him as she was expecting their second child. Irene Alexandra was born in July 1961 and in September, Neto and the children joined Agostinho on Santo Antão, Cape Verde, where he was working as a health inspector. They moved to Praia, when Agostinho was able to secure work in a hospital, but in 1962, he was transferred back to Lisbon. Securing permission to work at the Hospital de Santa Marta, Agostinho orchestrated an escape plan to get his family to Léopoldville, now in the Democratic Republic of the Congo. The activists who had established the Movimento Popular de Libertação de Angola (People's Movement for the Liberation of Angola, MPLA) were in exile in Léopoldville and believed that should Agostinho become the leader of their organization, it would unite Angolan nationalists. Leaving his mother-in-law's home, Agostinho and his family secured passports from and passage to Morocco before they reached the Congo. His leadership was confirmed at a conference in December, and the following month, during another conference in Brazzaville, in the Republic of the Congo, Neto gave birth to their daughter Leda. At the end of 1963, the family relocated to Brazzaville, when the MPLA was expelled from Léopoldville. Agostinho's sister Ruth joined his family, when in April 1968 they relocated to Dar es Salaam, Tanzania.

== Career ==
=== Tanzania (1968–1975) ===
In Tanzania, Neto began to work for the MPLA's women's wing, the Organização das Mulheres de Angola (Organization of Angolan Women, OMA). The OMA had been established in December 1962, as a means to extend the MPLA's reach in rural areas. As most women lived in the countryside, the organization mobilized village women through seminars focused on building cooperation and practical skills, such as literacy campaigns, political and child care education, and sewing classes. Women became instrumental in the fight for independence, transporting food and other goods. The OMA sent women abroad for training to become nurses, radio operators, and guerrilla fighters. Neto was put in charge of publishing a bulletin in French and English that was sent to organizations abroad. She also wrote radio programs that the MPLA broadcast into Angola from Tanzania. She made crafts that could be sold to raise money to help children and organized activities with the University of Dar es Salaam to bring awareness to their programs.

During this period, Neto began to write children's books. In 1972, she penned E nas florestas os bichos falaram (In the Forest the Animals Spoke), which would be published in 1977. At the Leipzig Book Fair in 1978, the book was awarded UNESCO's Honorary Prize. She wrote stories which were later published as a collection about their experiences during the independence struggle. One was about Hoji-ya-Henda, a guerrilla fighter; another about their escape from Portugal; one about the northern conflict in which all but 20 of the 200-member detachment were killed; and another about the donkeys which were used to transport goods. She also wrote a song to the bao-bab, a magical African tree, and a story about how stars formed. The last two were later submitted as part of Angola's contributions to the International Year of the Child in 1979. The Portuguese coup d'état in April 1974, suspended Portugal's military involvement in Angola, and in early 1975, the family returned to Luanda.

=== First Lady of Angola (1975–1979) ===
On 11 November 1975, Agostinho was proclaimed president when Angola achieved independence. Neto became the first person to hold the position of First Lady of Angola. As first lady, she served as the hostess of the nation and made diplomatic missions abroad. Throughout their tenure, the Angolan Civil War, which erupted immediately following independence, brought instability to the country. Neto's MPLA party, backed by the Soviet Union and Cuba, and the União Nacional para a Independência Total de Angola (National Union for the Total Independence of Angola, UNITA), backed by the United States and South Africa, fought for 27 years for control of the country. In an attempt to undermine the authority of the MPLA, UNITA used Neto's heritage as a Portuguese woman to assert that the MPLA was connected to the colonization of Angola. Agostinho countered that the MPLA represented racial collaboration uniting Black, White, and Mestizo people who fought together for Angola, whereas UNITA was backed by the South African Apartheid regime. Journalist Clarisse Juompan-Yakam reported that Neto expressed the difficulties she had "with white people being the first target during the liberation war".

Although she continued to serve on the OMA executive board and work with them on projects, Neto turned her attention to cultural development. She worked with museums in England, France, and the United States to collect and recover records and photographs about Angola. She was one of the founders of the Uniao dos Escritores Angolanos (Union of Angolan Writers) in 1975, which began publishing her writings in 1977. Neto's and Gabriela Antunes's works led to a flourishing of children's literature in the early days of independence. Many of their books had political and nationalist themes. Scholars José Luís Pires Laranjeira and Júlia Parreira Zuza Andrade, who reviewed this literary period in Angola stated that Neto's work E nas florestas os bichos falaram (In the Forest the Animals Spoke) made analogies between the destruction of nature by man and the destruction of the nation by colonialism. It also spoke of caring for the guerrillas who were seeking protection in the forests, as they were trying to protect the nation. Agostinho died on 10 September 1979 in Moscow after traveling to the Soviet Union to undergo surgery for pancreatic cancer.

=== Writer and activist (1980–present) ===
After Agostinho's death, Neto struggled with depression. She worked with writers Antero de Abreu and Dario de Melo to organize and publish Agostinho's previously unpublished poems. A renúncia impossível: poemas inéditos (The Impossible Renunciation: Unpublished Poems) was released by the Instituto Nacional do Livro e do Disco (The National Institute of Books and Records, INALD) in 1982. In 1987, Neto; Jacqueline Jackson, US peace activist and writer; Miriam Makeba, South African musician and civil rights activist; Sally Mugabe, First Lady of Zimbabwe; Marcela Pérez de Cuéllar, wife of the Peruvian Secretary-General of the United Nations; and Dabanga dos Santos, a Mozambican attaché to the United Nations, formed a foundation called the Children's Fund for Southern Africa (CHISA). The organization was established to address problems, such as lack of education, food, health care, shelter, and adequate clothing for mothers and children in Southern Africa, which mainly stemmed from on-going conflicts. They created orphanages and collected materials in support of education and entertainment. They were also able to establish free health clinics in cities and mothers' brigades to run educational campaigns on health, disease prevention, and immunization in schools. Neto and others traveled to the United States in 1988 to raise awareness and support for their programs.

After her husband's death, Neto experienced a difficult relationship with the Angolan government, as she did not think they were doing enough to preserve her husband's legacy. Directional changes in the political environment and particularly a shift to "self-aggrandizement" among political elites, according to scholars Miguel Cardina and Vasco Martins, led to a suspension in completing the Memorial António Agostinho Neto (MAAN), which had begun in 1982. Many of those who had fought beside Agostinho and supported his policies were pushed out of the Political Bureau of the MPLA and their contributions were minimized. Until 1998, when the plans for the MAAN were revised, little was accomplished. At that time, Neto traveled to Pyongyang, North Korea, to consult with the sculptors designing the pieces to be exhibited. In 2007, she founded and became president of the Fondation Antonio Agostinho Neto (Antonio Agostinho Neto Foundation, FAAN), an organization dedicated to furthering research and disseminating information about Angola's first president and his works. From its creation, the foundation worked with the design team to complete the MAAN, which was finally opened in 2012.

Many of her works, such as A Trepadeira Que Queria Ver o Céu Azul (2011), A Formação de Uma Estrela (2013), As Nossas Mãos Constroem a Liberdade (2018), As Aventuras de Amor-Flor em África (2018) have been reissued since their first publication. Reviewer John Bella stated that the works illustrate the difficulties encountered during the war and help youth understand the cost of freedom. In 2016, Neto published Cartas de Maria Eugénia Neto a Agostinho Neto (Letters from Maria Eugénia to Agostinho Neto ), and in 2021, she launched three books Em cabo verde nasceu um menino chamava-se Agostinho Neto (In Cape Verde a Boy was Born Called Agostinho Neto), Fica aí dentro do quarto soldado sou eu (I'm Inside the Soldier's Room), and Ninguém impediria a chuva (No One Would Stop the Rain), which each focused on a different period in the lives of her and her husband.

== Legacy ==
Neto won the National Prize for Culture and Arts from the Uniao dos Escritores Angolanos (Union of Angolan Writers) for her body of work in 2011. The organization recognizes her as the "first Angolan writer to gain international recognition". In 2017, she became one of the three women, the other two being Irene Guerra Marques and Fátima Viegas, who have been inducted into the Academia Angolana de Letras (Angolan Academy of Letters). Angolan journalist, Artur Queiroz published a biography of Neto, Maria Eugénia Neto: Memórias de Jenny – A noiva de vestido azul (Maria Eugénia Neto: Memories of Jenny – The Bride in the Blue Dress), in 2020. She received the Order of Amílcar Cabral in the second degree, Cape Verde's highest national honor, in July 2023 for her contributions and commitment to the liberation struggles in and development of Africa. The International University of Rome awarded her an Laurea Honoris Causa in October. The Maria Eugenia Neto Provincial Hospital in M'banza-Kongo was named in her honor, as was a neighborhood in Luanda.

== Selected works ==
- Neto, Maria Eugénia (1969). No Prelúdio da Vitória [In the Prelude to Victory] (in Portuguese). Dar es Salaam, Tanzania: Departamento de Informação e Propaganda do MPLA.
- Neto, Maria Eugénia (1973). O Humanismo de Henda [Henda's Humanism] (in Portuguese). Dar es Salaam, Tanzania: Departamento de Informação e Propaganda do MPLA.
- Neto, Maria Eugénia (1977). E nas florestas os bichos falaram [In the Forest the Animals Spoke] (in Portuguese). Luanda, Angola: Uniao dos Escritores Angolanos.
- Neto, Maria Eugénia (1979). Foi Esperança e Foi Certeza [It was Hope and It Was Certainty] (in Portuguese). Lisbon, Portugal: Edições 70. OCLC 253462939.
- Neto, Maria Eugénia (1979). A Formação de Uma Estrela e Outras Histórias na Terra [The Formation of a Star and Other Stories on Earth] (in Portuguese). Lisbon, Portugal: Edições 70. OCLC 955740566.
- Neto, Maria Eugénia (1979). As Nossas Mãos Constroem a Liberdade [Our Hands Build Freedom] (in Portuguese). Luanda, Angola: Edições Instituto Nacional do Livro e do Disco. OCLC 9000678.
- Neto, Maria Eugénia (1981). A Lenda das Asas e da Menina Mestiça-Flor [The Legend of the Wings and the Mestizo Flower Girl] (in Portuguese). Luanda, Angola: Uniao dos Escritores Angolanos. OCLC 180586145.
- Neto, Maria Eugénia (1984). A Trepadeira Que Queria Ver o Céu Azul [The Bindweed That Wanted to See the Blue Sky] (in Portuguese). Lisbon, Portugal: Publicações Europa-América. OCLC 551536912.
- Neto, Maria Eugénia (1988). A Menina Euflores: Planeta da Estrela Sikus [The Euflores Girl: Planet of the Sikus Star] (in Portuguese). Lisbon, Portugal: Plátano Editora. OCLC 316805476.
- Neto, Maria Eugénia (1989). A Montanha do Sol [The Sun Mountain] (in Portuguese). Alverca do Ribatejo, Portugal: Centro de Bem-Estar Infantil de Alverca. OCLC 29916537.
- Neto, Maria Eugénia (1989). Este É o Canto: Homenagem a Agostinho Neto [This Is the Song: Homage to Agostinho Neto] (in Portuguese). Luanda, Angola: Edições Instituto Nacional do Livro e do Disco. OCLC 611961873.
- Neto, Maria Eugénia (1989). O Vaticínio da Kianda na Piroga do Tempo [Kianda's Prophecy in the Pirogue of Time] (in Portuguese). Luanda, Angola: Edições Instituto Nacional do Livro e do Disco. OCLC 439778720.
- Neto, Maria Eugénia (1991). Ninguém Impediria a Chuva [No One Would Stop the Rain] (in Portuguese). Luanda, Angola: Edições Instituto Nacional do Livro e do Disco. OCLC 33207474.
- Neto, Maria Eugénia (1992). As Aventuras de Amor-Flor em África [Amor-Flor's Adventures in Africa] (in Portuguese). Luanda, Angola: Uniao dos Escritores Angolanos. OCLC 1075936079.
- Neto, Maria Eugénia (2001). O Soar dos Quissanges [The Sound of Kisanjis] (in Portuguese). Lisbon, Portugal: Editorial Presenca. ISBN 978-972-23-3039-8.
