= Urcos District =

Coordinates: 13.6849°S 71.6267°W

Urcos Urqus
- District
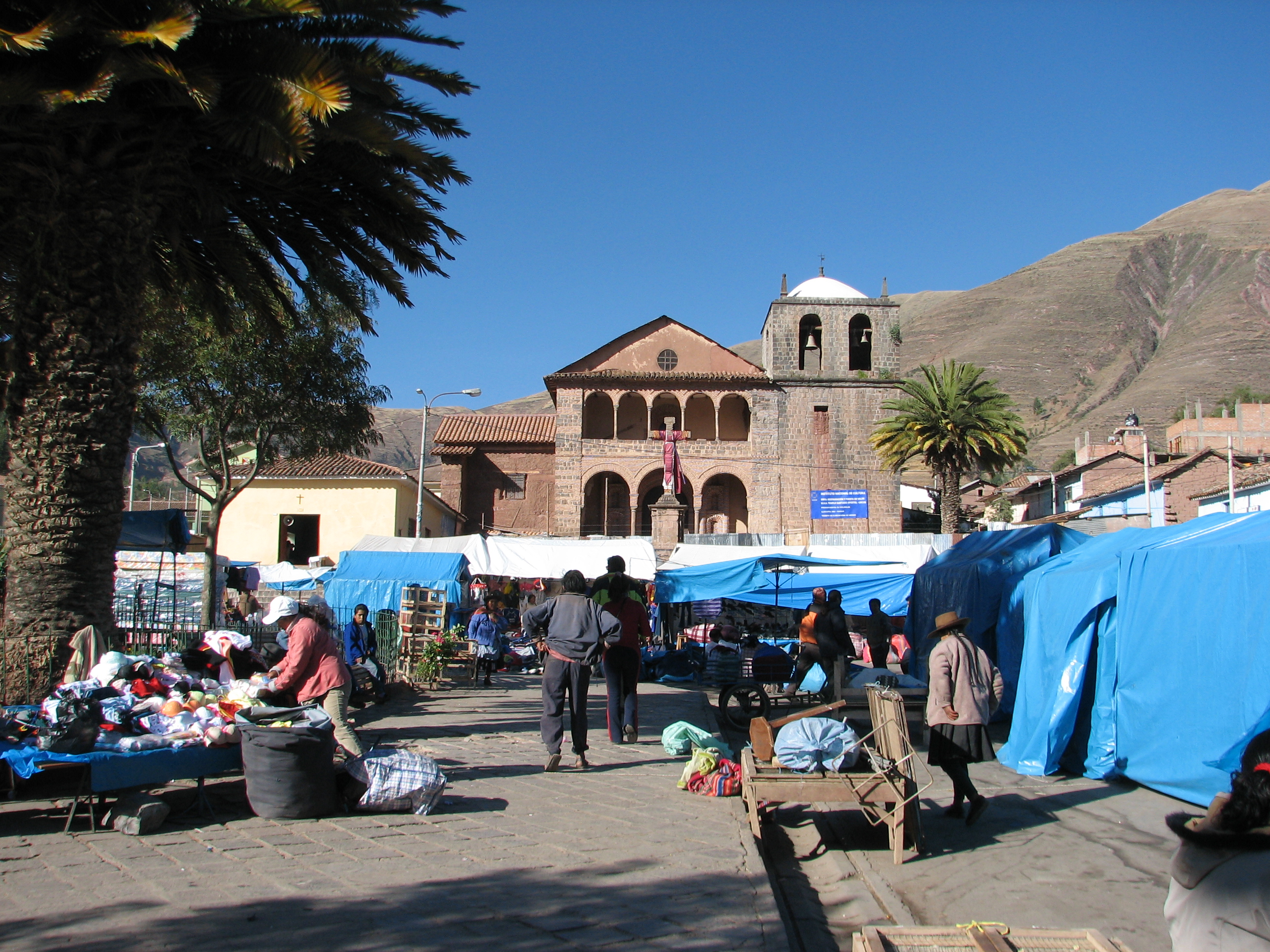
- Plaza de Armas
- Interactive map of Urcos
- Country: Peru
- Region: Cusco
- Province: Quispicanchi
- Founded: January 2, 1857
- Capital: Urcos

Government
  - Mayor: Manuel Jesús Sutta Pfocco

Area
  - Total: 134.65 km^{2} (51.99 sq mi)
- Elevation: 3,150 m (10,330 ft)

Population (2017)
  - Total: 10,614
  - Density: 78.827/km^{2} (204.16/sq mi)
- Time zone: UTC-5 (PET)
- UBIGEO: 081201

The Urcos District is one of the twelve districts in the Quispicanchi Province in Peru. Created on January 2, 1857, its capital is the town of Urcos. Urcos is southeast of the former Inca capital, Cusco, in the southern Andes, and it is at an altitude of 3,180 meters (10,430 ft).

== Geography ==
The most important river of the district is the Willkanuta which crosses the district from south-east to north-west. A lake named Quyllur Urmana lies in the west of the town at the foot of Wiraqucha.

One of the highest peaks of the district is Quri at approximately 4,200 m (13,800 ft). Other mountains are listed below:

- Minas
- Mulli Pampa
- Puka Q'asa
- Puma Urqu
- Qhispi Urqu
- Q'illu Rumiyuq
- Ruq'a Urqu
- Ruq'ayuq
- Wiraqucha
- Yana Waylla

== Ethnic groups ==
The people in the district are mainly indigenous citizens of Quechua descent. Quechua is the language which the majority of the population (54.58%) learnt to speak in childhood, 45.03% of the residents started speaking using the Spanish language (2007 Peru Census).
