= Andahuaylillas District =

Andahuaylillas
- District
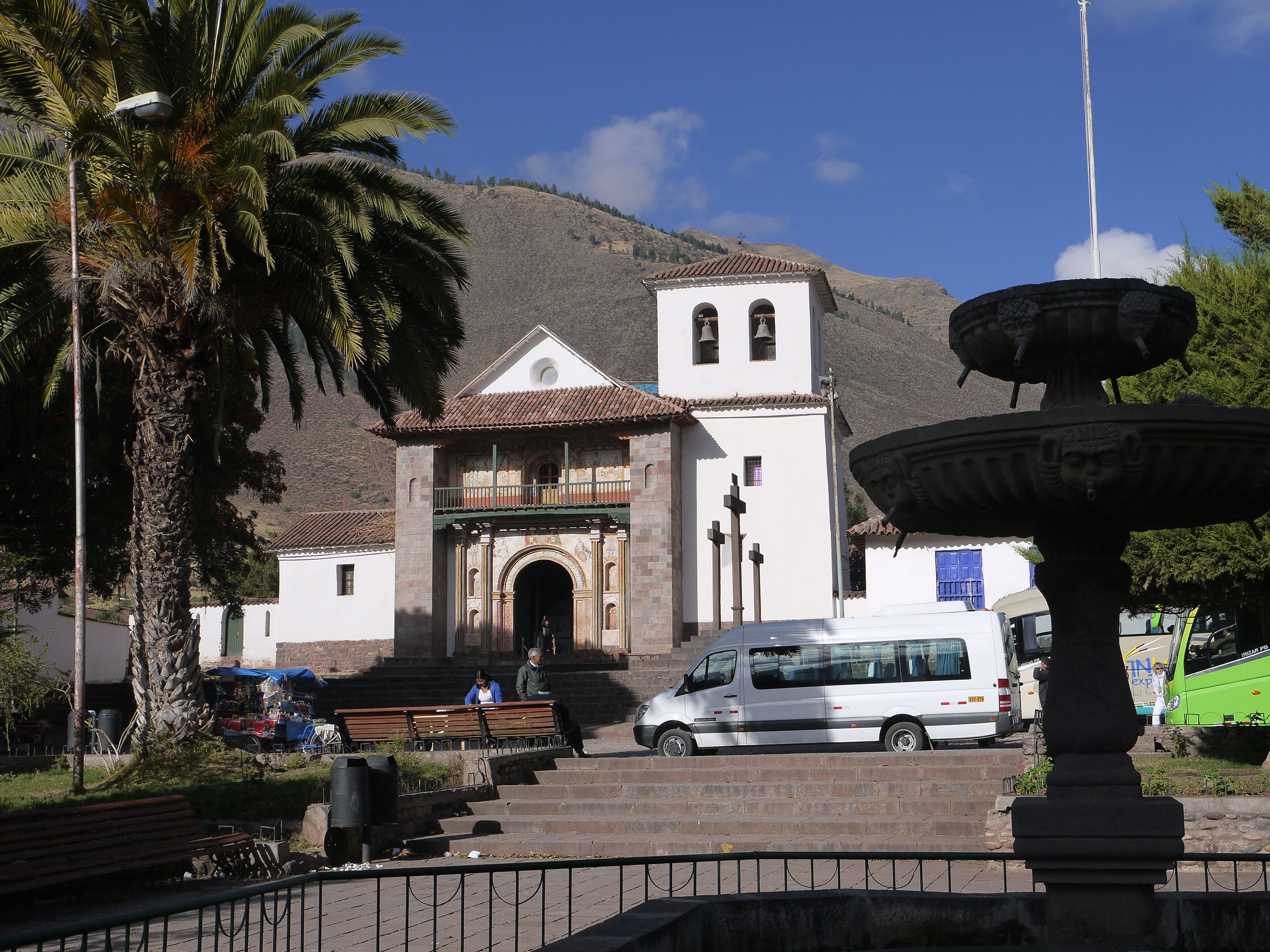
- The Church in Andahuaylilas
- Interactive map of Andahuaylillas
- Coordinates: 13°40′16″S 71°40′26″W
- Country: Peru
- Region: Cusco
- Province: Quispicanchi
- Founded: January 2, 1857
- Capital: Andahuaylillas
- Subdivisions: 27 populated centers

Government
  - Mayor: Vicente Salas Pilares

Area
  - Total: 84.6 km^{2} (32.7 sq mi)
- Elevation: 3,122 m (10,243 ft)

Population (2005 census)
  - Total: 5,399
  - Density: 63.8/km^{2} (165/sq mi)
- Time zone: UTC-5 (PET)
- UBIGEO: 081202

The Andahuaylillas District is one of the twelve districts in the Quispicanchi Province in Peru. Created on January 2, 1857, its capital is the town of Andahuaylillas. It is located 45 km South of Cusco. Andahuaylillas is one of the main stages of the Andean Baroque Route along with Cusco, Huaro and Urcos. Andahuaylillas joined the UNESCO Global Network of Learning Cities in 2024.

== Geography ==
The most important river of the district is the Willkanuta.

== Ethnic groups ==
The people in the district are mainly indigenous citizens of Quechua descent. Quechua is the language which the majority of the population (56.06%) learnt to speak in childhood, 43.25% of the residents started speaking using the Spanish language (2007 Peru Census).

== Church of San Pedro de Andahuaylillas ==
The main attraction of Andahuaylillas is its baroque church, the Church of San Pedro de Andahuaylillas (Spanish: San Pedro Apóstol de Andahuaylillas), dedicated to Saint Peter the Apostle. The church was built by Jesuits in the 16th-century, covering a pre-Columbian huaca. Construction on the chapel started in 1570. And by 1606, the church nave and the facade were completed.

The church is nicknamed, "the Sistine Chapel of America" because of the magnificent frescos that adorn its walls, painted in the 1620s by Luis de Riaño and his indigenous collaborators. The painting depicts the roads to heaven and to hell, and the composition was inspired by northern European prints.

== See also ==
- Andean Baroque Route
- Quri
- Qusqu Qhawarina
- Wiraqucha
