= Lwini Foundation =

Aid organisation in Angola

- Named after: Luvale word for "princess"
- Founded: 1998
- Founded at: Luanda, Angola
- Type: International non-governmental organization
- Purpose: Disabilities, casualties of land mines, improving living conditions in rural communities
- Headquarters: Luanda, Angola
- Region served: Angola
- President: Ana Paula dos Santos
- Website: www.fundacaolwini.org/en/

The Lwini Foundation is an aid organisation in Angola. Founded by first lady of Angola Ana Paula dos Santos (wife of President José Eduardo dos Santos) as the Lwini Fund on 30 June 1998, it caters to civilian victims of land mines and other disabilities. The foundation's activities include rehabilitation of schools, construction of training centers, and repairing rural villages. In 2010, the name was changed to the current Lwini Foundation.

== Description ==
Objectives include:

- The promotion of advocacy and awareness actions for the disabled victims, their families and families of others impacted during and after conflicts.
- Development and provision of medical pathways for referrals and adequate health care services including psychological assistance.
- Establishment of employment access through livelihood support and capacity building.
- Government engagement on policies and plans put in place to accommodate and empower mine victims.
- Joint sensitization and awareness on the prevention of land mines.
- Livelihood sensitization through group discussions on importance of agriculture and economic livelihood emphasizing on effective sustenance.
- Developing initiatives that would provide rural community loans for women and widows, sustainable livelihood etc.
- Partnership with various organisations to tackle various sectors such as; food, shelter, healthcare, livelihood, etc.

=== Leadership ===
As of April 2017, the Lwini Foundation is headed by President Ana Paula dos Santos and Vice President Joana Lina Ramos Baptista.

=== Symbolism ===
"Lwini" means a female and a princess in the Luvale language (east of Angola), who gives the wave of chanas to the wind, while reflecting the various daytime sunshades.

The Lwini logo represents protection: a woman protecting her child against existing mines in Chanas, the community adults protecting the young ones in the community, and the community protecting its members.

== Activities ==
Some of Lwini Foundation activities in recent years:

- Delivering wheelchairs to mark the International Day of Persons with Disabilities
- Commissioning a support centre for visually impaired students Law Faculty of Agostinho Neto University in Luanda
- The presentation of Palanca Parade project, at the Gala of Lwini Foundation
