= Pikillaqta =

Archaeological site in Peru

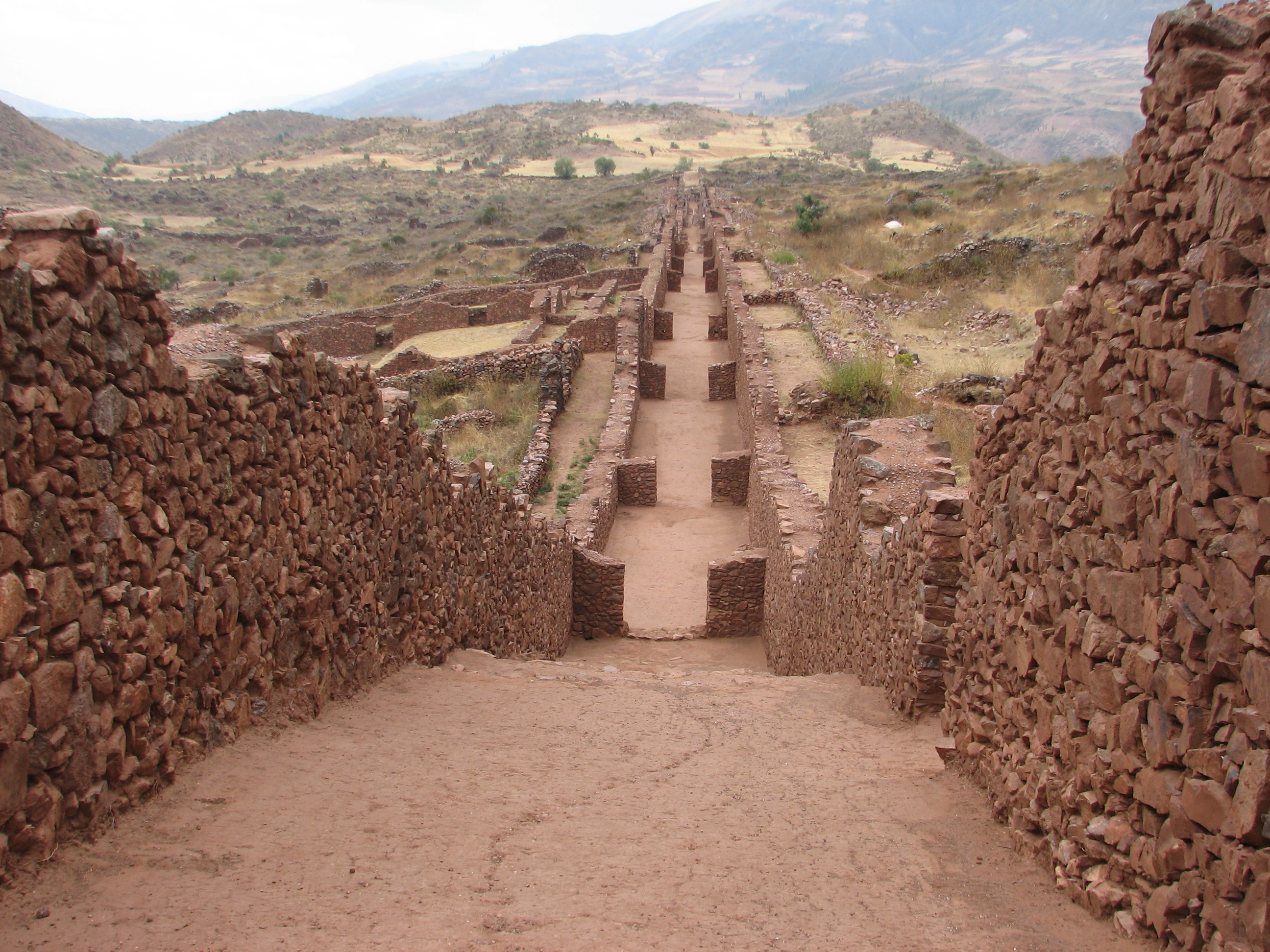
- View of a Pikillaqta sector

- Location within Peru
- Interactive map of Pikillaqta
- 13°37′00″S 71°42′53″W
- Type: Settlement
- Periods: Middle Horizon
- Cultures: Wari culture
- Location: Quispicanchi Province, Cusco Region, Peru
- Region: Andes

History
- Built: 500
- Abandoned: 1200

Site notes
- Area: 34.208 km^{2} (13.208 sq mi)

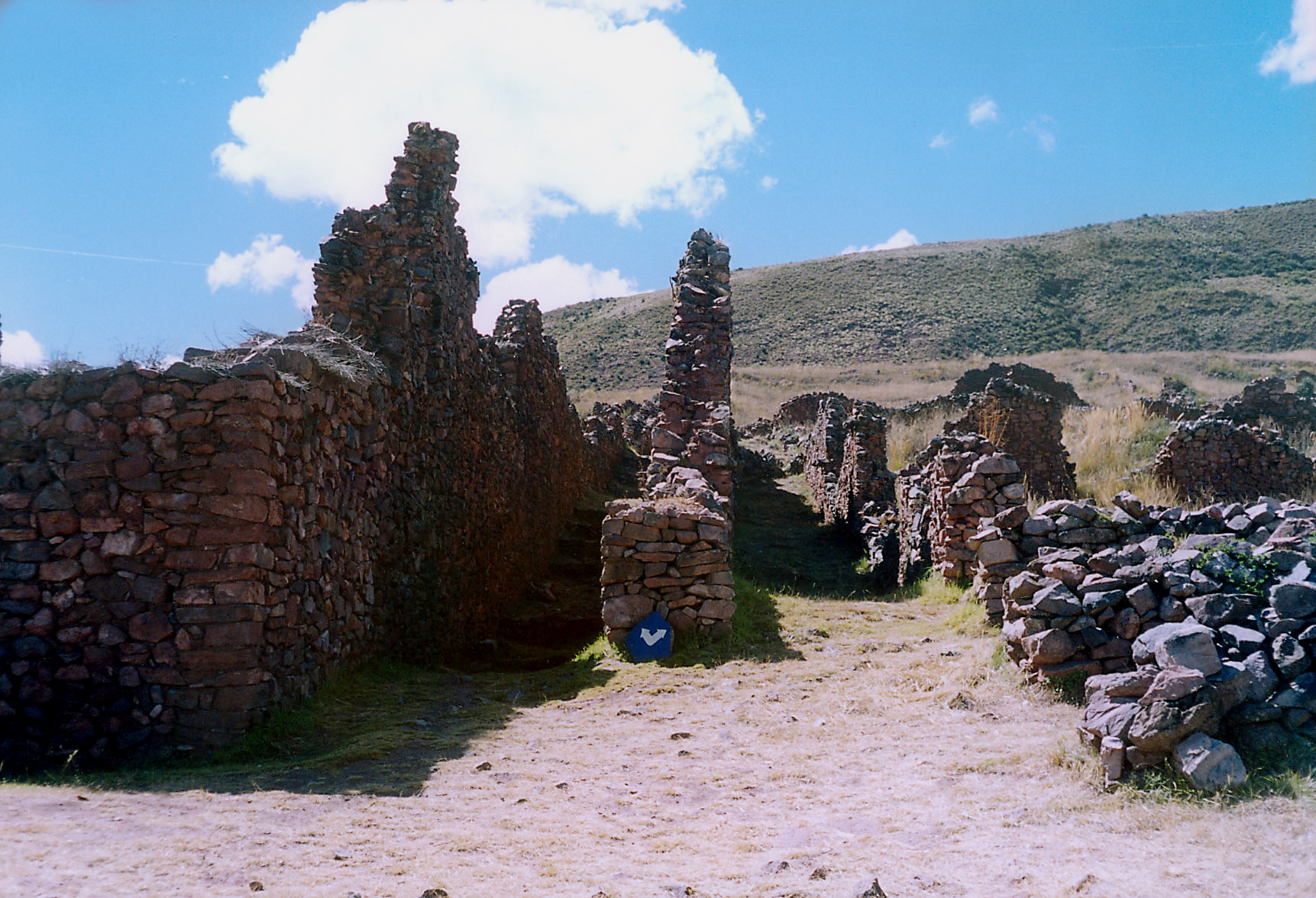
A street of Pikillaqta

Pikillaqta (Quechua piki flea, llaqta a place (village, town, community, country, nation), "flea place", also spelled Piki Llacta, Pikillacta, Piquillacta, Piquillaqta) is a large Wari culture archaeological site in the Quispicanchi province of the Cusco Region of Peru.

Pikillaqta is a village of the Wari people. Wari was the centre village and other cities like Pikillaqta were influenced by it. The Wari also inhabited many other sites around the area. The site was occupied from about 550 to 1100 AD. Its main use was for ceremonies and the site was not complete when it was abandoned.

== Geography and environment ==
Pikillaqta is located 3,200 meters above sea level in the Lucre Basin of the eastern Valley of Cusco, an area characterized by grassy hills mixed with rock and sand. The climate is cold and arid, averaging 300 millimeters of precipitation per month during winter and spring and 106 millimeters during late spring, summer, and fall. Temperature ranges between 60 degrees Fahrenheit in the warmest months, but easily reaches freezing in colder seasons.

== History of excavations ==
The history of workers and excavations at Pikillaqta is almost a century old and wrought with superficial, expedient assessments. Luis Valcarcel was the first to study Pikillaqta archaeologically—in 1927—but only found two green-stoned figurines and did not publish his findings until years later. Emilio Harth-Terre next published ground plans of Pikillaqta in 1959 but made no attempt to excavate. William Sanders assessed architectural surface remains and further subdivided the site in the 1960s, but ultimately only searched two buildings. Most questions and current knowledge about Pikillaqta were finally answered when Gordon McEwan excavated Pikillaqta on three separate occasions: in 1978-79, 1981–82, and 1989–90. In the 1989-90 excavation extensive research was done on the architecture and on trash middens. McEwan divided the site into four sectors to research them more easily. Mary Glowacki conducted a ceramic analysis of the site in 1996.

Archaeological investigations of Pikillaqta were most recently undertaken by the Peruvian Ministry of Culture between 2017 and 2018. This work included digging test pits, trenches, and excavating around Pikillaqta's central plaza.

== Agriculture and canal systems ==
Maize was found in one of the excavations carried out by McEwan along with 20 well-preserved beans. Maize was an important crop, farmed by the people of Pikillaqta as a major source of food through substantial irrigation systems. Maize was important to Wari culture and was painted on pottery alongside deities and supernaturals. Canals, reservoirs, aqueducts were at Pikillaqta along with terraces and cultivated fields. Pikillaqta economically controlled the area through agriculture. There was a hydraulic network in Pikillaqta that led through canals and agriculture fields to help the people. Water for irrigation was brought in mainly by the rainfall, which leads to the hydraulic system. August through December there was hardly any rain and the artificial irrigation system was used. December through January there was plenty of rain and artificial irrigation was not used much. May through June was the harvest season and irrigation was used when it was needed. Canals were built of stone and were connected to the Lucre River and Chelke stream. There are over 48 thousand meters of canal in the system with canal A and Canal B being the longest and connected to Pikillaqta. Canal A provided water for irrigation at terraces 1, 2, 3, and 4 and was connected to aqueducts. Canal A provided for the most important buildings in the center of Pikillaqta. These feats of hydro-engineering supported crop production and provided the people with water. In one unit of the trash middens two grinding stones were found and these were rare finds because of the scarcity surface evidence.

Middens of Pikillaqta contain over 5000 bones, most of which belonged to camelids, guinea pigs, and other small rodents. McEwan posited these were primary sources of sustenance along with maize. Projectile points were also found in the middens—possibly used to kill and prepare the animals with which they were buried.

== Functions of site ==
At around A.D. 650, the Wari erected Pikillaqta, a huge fortified complex covering 25 hectares (250,000 square meters) south of the Cusco valley. Pikillaqta was garrisoned and all five entrances to the valley accessible from the altiplano were heavily fortified (McEwan 1996:169). Pikillaqta may have been large feasting site. There was a large patio or plaza in the middle of the complex that probably was the center of the administrative rituals and religious practices. Rulers and their kin would come together and feast and drink, and with the capacity of the patio, Pikillaqta could hold a ceremony for people from other Wari settlements. Great amounts of chicha (an alcoholic beverage produced by fermenting corn) was drunk. Maize and chicha were very important in rituals, they were sacred so they appeared often in ceremonies. Even though the plaza was the focal point of the ceremonies, other places at Pikillaqta show some important ceremonial use. Niched halls were important religious buildings (McEwan 2005:152). There were 18 of these structures. The halls were looted but they may once have held sacred objects and offerings. In Wari art, ceremonies were depicted with a ceremonial pole coming out of the center of niched halls along with offerings, plants, and felines shown in a sacred context. The functions of the niched halls then were probably ceremonially and ritually used because the halls match up with other Wari sites and art. Small conjoint buildings were also present at the site for ritual use (McEwan 2005:158). There were 501 structures of these rooms. A small number of people could gather here for ritual feasting on a smaller more private scale. Sector four of the small conjoint buildings could have been a place where mummies were held and visited. Small fire hearths were found in them where offerings to the deceased could have been made. The Wari thought it was important to keep in touch with the mummies so they could watch over the living so they were regularly visited. There were four chambers included in the small conjoint rooms and one contained a large stone that the Wari couldn't move. They built their structure around this and the rock was then probably used as a sacred object.

== Leadership and religion ==
There was no distinct evidence that showed inequality at the site of Pikillaqta but there were probably different classes. People of higher power and prestige would have been needed to watch over and control the events and ceremonies of the large-scale site. Evidence form other Wari sites would insist that elites or leaders would have held everything in check and working order. Kinship was important for the Wari. Many decisions and ceremonies were revolved around fictive kinship and ancestor worship. The main Wari deity in Wari religion was Waricocha. Waricocha was the "staff god" who controlled life and death. He was the creator of all things, the universe, sun, moon, and civilization. On pottery and in art Waricocha was shown with a staff in each hand and with rays coming out of his head. These showed divine power and at the end of the rays animals, like pumas and condors, were attached along with maize.

== Trade and specialization ==
Items like turquoise bluish-green stone were traded into the area. They were used for figurines and bluish-green stone was not found in the area. Other stones, gemstones, and minerals were exchanged around the area and according to Anita Cook Pikillaqta may have been the center of the big trade network. The pottery in Pikillaqta was also traded in, Okros and Wamanga style pottery were two of the main styles and they were made around the area. Pikillaqta was one of the biggest Wari sites so other goods were probably traded in and out of the area and housed in the many buildings at Pikillaqta. Many people came around for the ceremonies so a lot of items were probably traded or brought in with them.

Specialization could be found in the bluish-green figurines found at Pikillaqta. Two different sets of 40 votive turquoise figurines were found in grave lots. This was an important number because it showed state organization as an administrative unit and rank. These were also the only figurines found so far from the Middle Horizon period. The figurines ranged in size from 18 to 52 millimetres. There were turquois processing locations and workshops at Pikillaqta. Stone carving was also present in the city and could have been a specialization. The architecture for the buildings would have needed long precise time to build because they are connected and so big. Specialization of bronze arsenic was also present at the site. There were many artifacts made out of bronze.

== Remains found ==
A few burials were uncovered during excavations at Pikillaqta. Two wall tombs, a few offering pits, and one room held skeletal remains. In the niched halls (Unit 10), 10 skulls were found in an offering pit. Seven were found during earlier excavations which were found in red soil. Three more skulls were found in gray soil during McEwan's excavations. A bronze spike was the only other object found in this pit. In another pit, bone fragments were found with green stains indicating they were buried with copper: however copper was not found in the pit, and a few shell artifacts were found. Looting occurred in many of these pits which has resulted in the loss of multiple artifacts from the burial chambers. Multiple buildings and ceremonial pits show signs of looting. The looters cleared out possible grave goods that could have been buried with skeletons, especially if they were valuable. In Wall Tomb 1, a man and woman were found. Small turquoise-colored stone beads were present with the remains. The remains were placed in the wall at time of construction in seated position. In the second wall tomb the body was also seated upright but fell over at some point.

Four nearly complete skeletons and ten other skulls were found at the site. Wall Tomb 1 included an adult male and female. The male was aged 35–45, and his skull displayed evidence of a healed fracture from blow to face, cranium deformation, and gum disease. The female was aged 35–50, had more cavities and tooth wear than male found in tomb. Wall Tomb 2 had a female aged 17–20. The partial skeleton from Unit 49 was aged 16–18. Out of the 10 skulls excavated, McEwan and his team examined three of them. One skull displayed cranial deformation and another had three healed trephinations. No clear evidence showed the signs of death in the remains in at Pikillacta.

== Abandonment ==
Pikillaqta was occupied from about 550 to 1100 AD and around 1100 AD is when it was ultimately abandoned. Reasoning for this is not exact but it could have been because of a crisis in the empire or that the Wari were trying to expand somewhere else then planning to come back. There were two stages in the abandonment: the part where the Wari left and then a giant fire after that. The site was abandoned before much of architecture was complete. Sector 2 of the site was finished architecturally and used according to research. After that part was finished, sectors 1, 4 and then sector 3 were worked on in that order. In sector 1, two excavations showed that the interior walls of the structure were not plastered with clay or white gypsum. In Unit 47 there was evidence of an offering shown there so it was in the process of being built but not complete. Section 4 had most of the architecture finished with some incomplete walls and unfinished floors. In sector 3 Unit 34 showed little amount of completion; the building was full of sterile soil, the walls were unfinished, the floor was not laid, and the offerings in there were not placed in the corners. The door was blocked and sealed in clay probably because it was abandoned during construction. Abandonment occurred during construction of sectors 1, 3 and 4. The sealing of a number of key doorways occurred so unwanted visitors would have trouble entering some structures. Some buildings were sealed off completely with clay. Valuable goods were not found at hand on site and this could explain why very few artifacts were found anywhere at the site.

The last part of the abandonment stage was marked by a massive fire. The Wari sealed up and tried to protect the site as if intending to return. McEwan believed after they left, local people wanted to destroy the site and set it ablaze. Completely carbonized beams and burning on the underside of floors suggests the fire was deliberate. Sectors 1 and 2 had been destroyed by fire. McEwan believed they were trying to expand their control and eventually the splitting of the Wari led to the end of the reign of the empire. After the fire looters at unknown times came through the site and got into some of the burials on site. They are the only known people to be active on the site before archaeologists investigated. Pikillaqta is open for visitors to view the ruins of the large complex.

== See also ==
- Chuqi Pukyu
- Rumiqullqa

== Sources ==
- Cook, Anita G., 1992 Stone ancestors: idioms of imperial attire and rank among Huari figurines. Latin American Antiquity: 341–364
- Glowacki, Mary and Gordon McEwan

2001 Pikallacta, Huaro and the greater Cuzco region: new interpretations of Wari occupation in the southern highlands. Boletin de arqueologia: 31-49

- Lau, George, 1996 Ancient Andean space and architecture: new synthesis and debate. Antiquity: 720–724
- McEwan, Gordon F., 1986 Wari Empire in the southern Peruvian highlands: a view from the provinces. Nature of Wari: a Reappraisal of the Middle Horizon Period in Peru: 53–71
- McEwan, Gordon F., 1996 Archaeological Investigations at Pikillacta, a Wari site in Peru. Journal of field Archaeology: 169–186
- McEwan, Gordon F., 2005, Pikillacta:The Wari Empire in Cuzco, University of Iowa Press, Iowa city.
