= Andean Baroque Route =

External videos
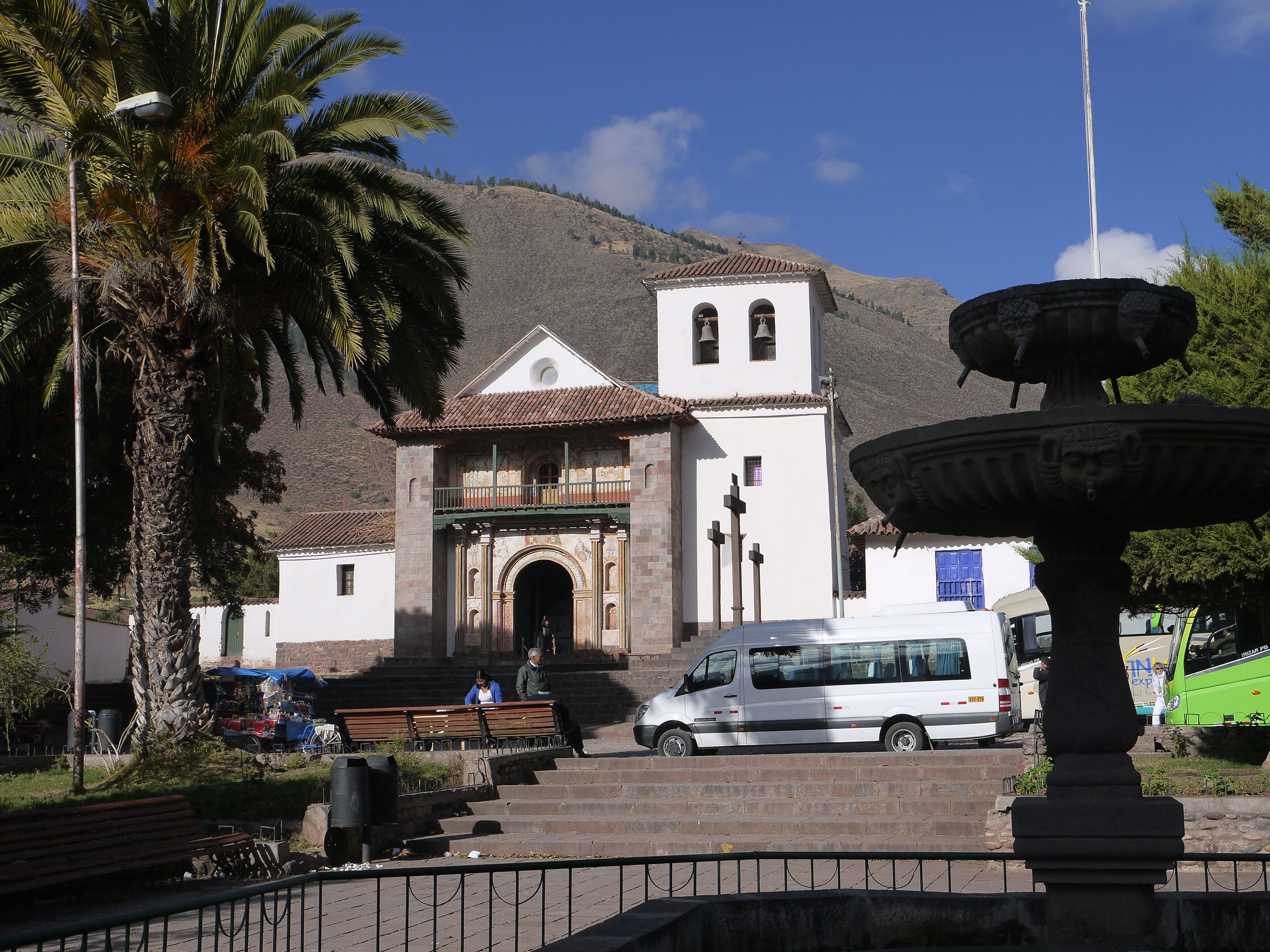
- San Pedro Apóstol de Andahuaylillas, Smarthistory

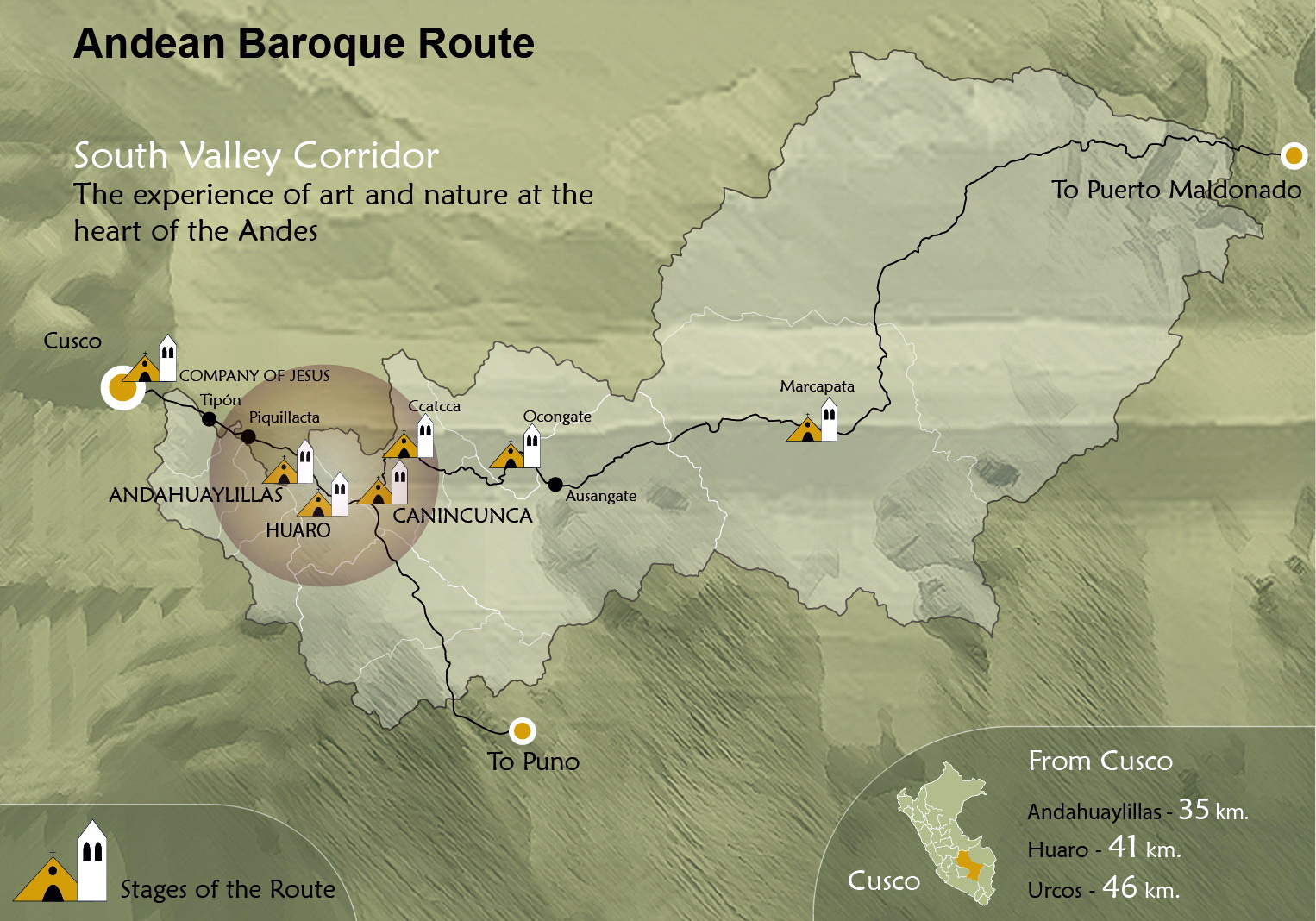
Andean baroque route

The Andean Baroque Route is a scenic route of Peru mainly dedicated to 4 churches belonging to the Andean Baroque artistic movement, including the Society of Jesus Church of Cusco and the Saint Peter the Apostle Church of Andahuaylillas.

There are two possible versions of this route: one short and one long. The short route passes through Cusco, Andahuaylillas, Huaro and Urcos towards lake Titicaca and Bolivia. The long route includes these same stages but continues towards Puerto Maldonado after reaching Urcos. It passes through Ccatcca, Ocongate and Marcapata.

== Short Route ==
=== Society of Jesus Church - Cusco ===
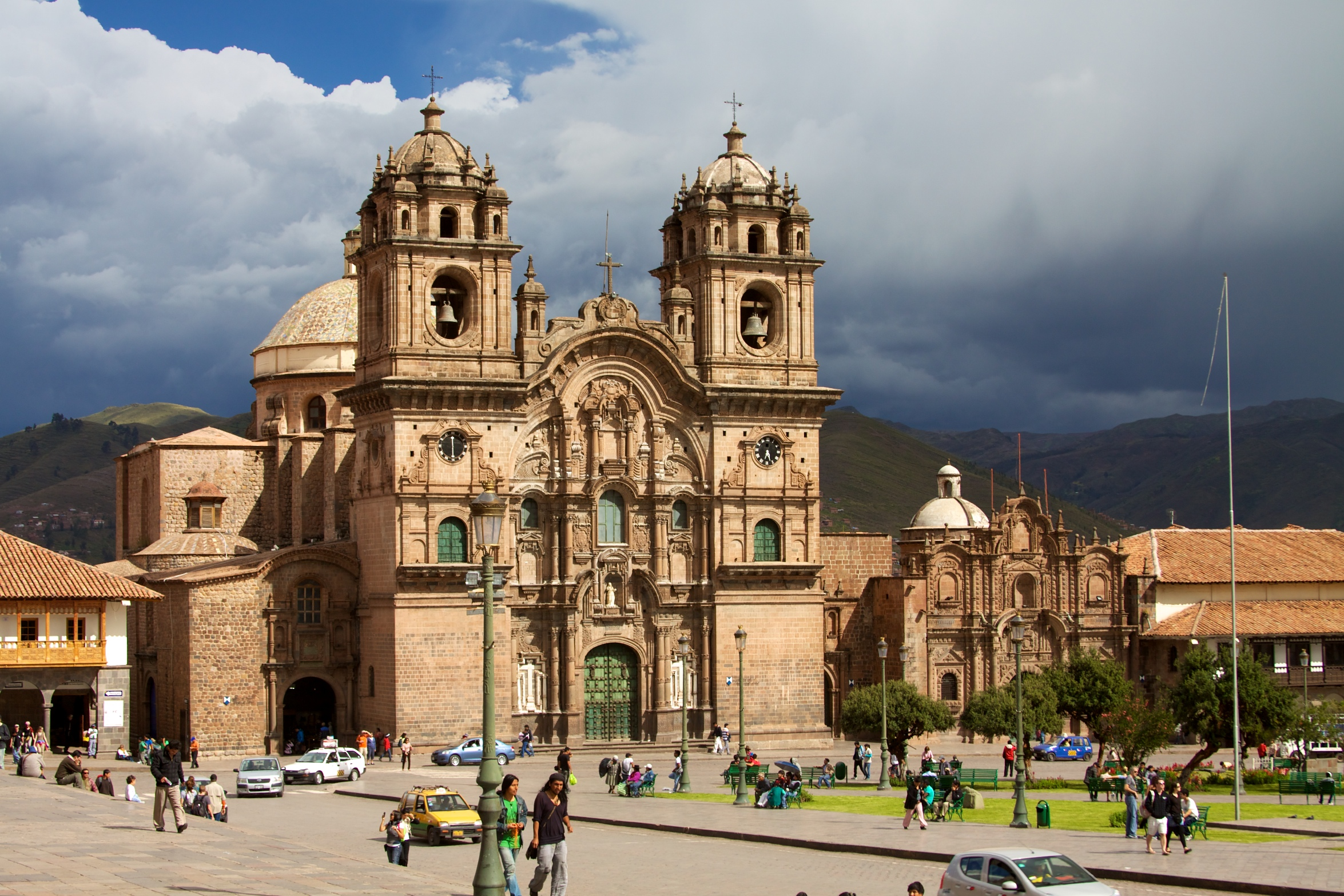
Society of Jesus Church

The construction of the church began in 1576 at the initiative of the jesuits on the top of the Amarucancha, the Palace of the Inca Huayna Capac. The church is considered to be one of the most beautiful representations of the colonial baroque art in America. Its spectacular façade, the highest of the Cusquenian churches, is entirely made of stones. Inside, one can see an altar covered with gold leaves built over an underground chapel. The church has a significant collection of sculptures and paintings such as “the wedding of Ignatius of Loyola’s nephew”.

=== Saint Peter the Apostle Church - Andahuaylillas ===
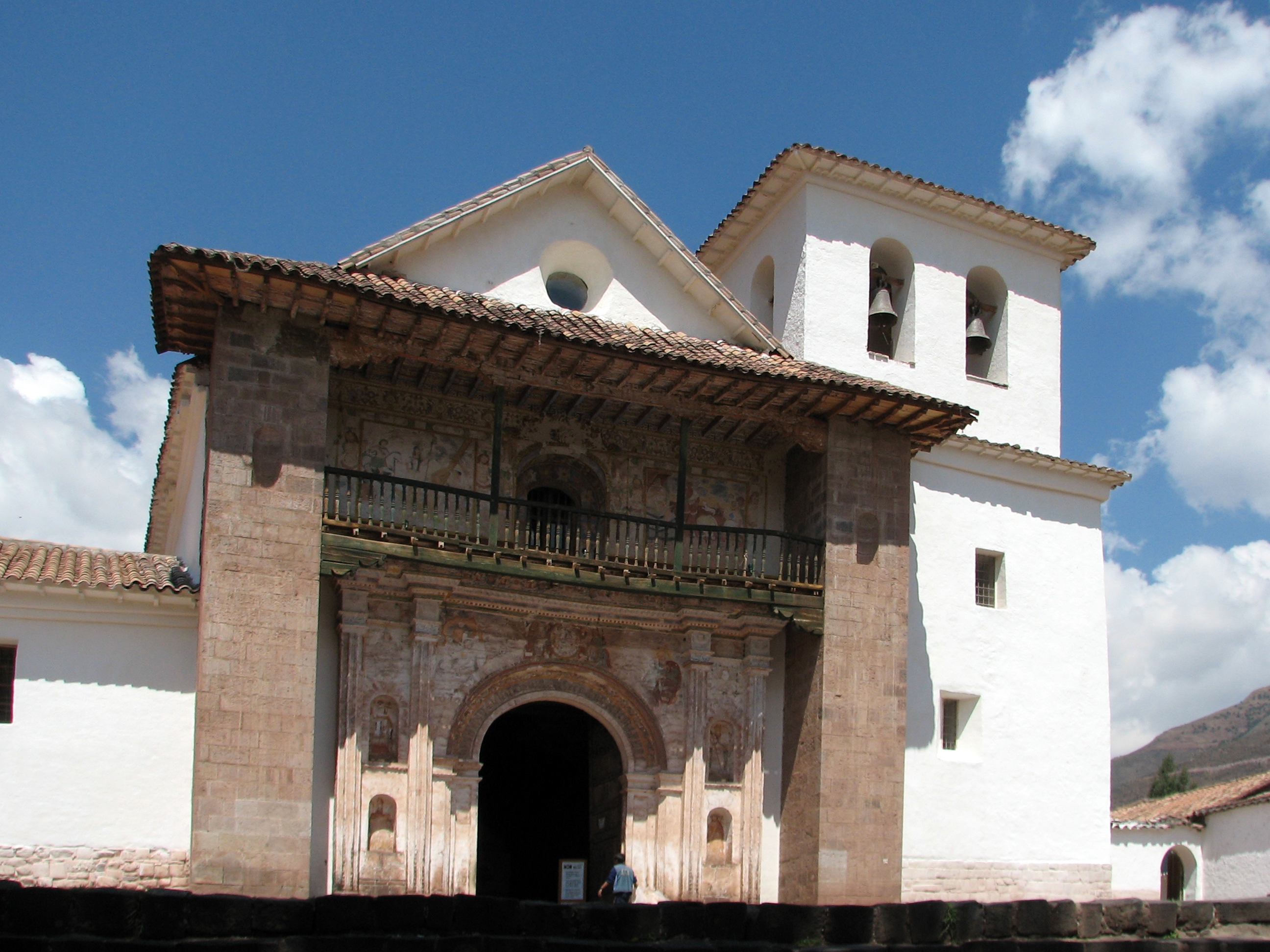
Saint Peter the Apostle Church

Saint Peter the Apostle Church of Andahuaylillas is nicknamed the Sistine Chapel of the Andes because of the magnificent frescos adorning its walls. Andahuaylillas is a small town located 45 km away from Cusco. The church, probably built on an ancient Inca site at the end of the 16th century, is covered with murals. One of them is signed by the Limenian painter Luis de Riaño in 1626.

=== Saint John the Baptist Church - Huaro ===
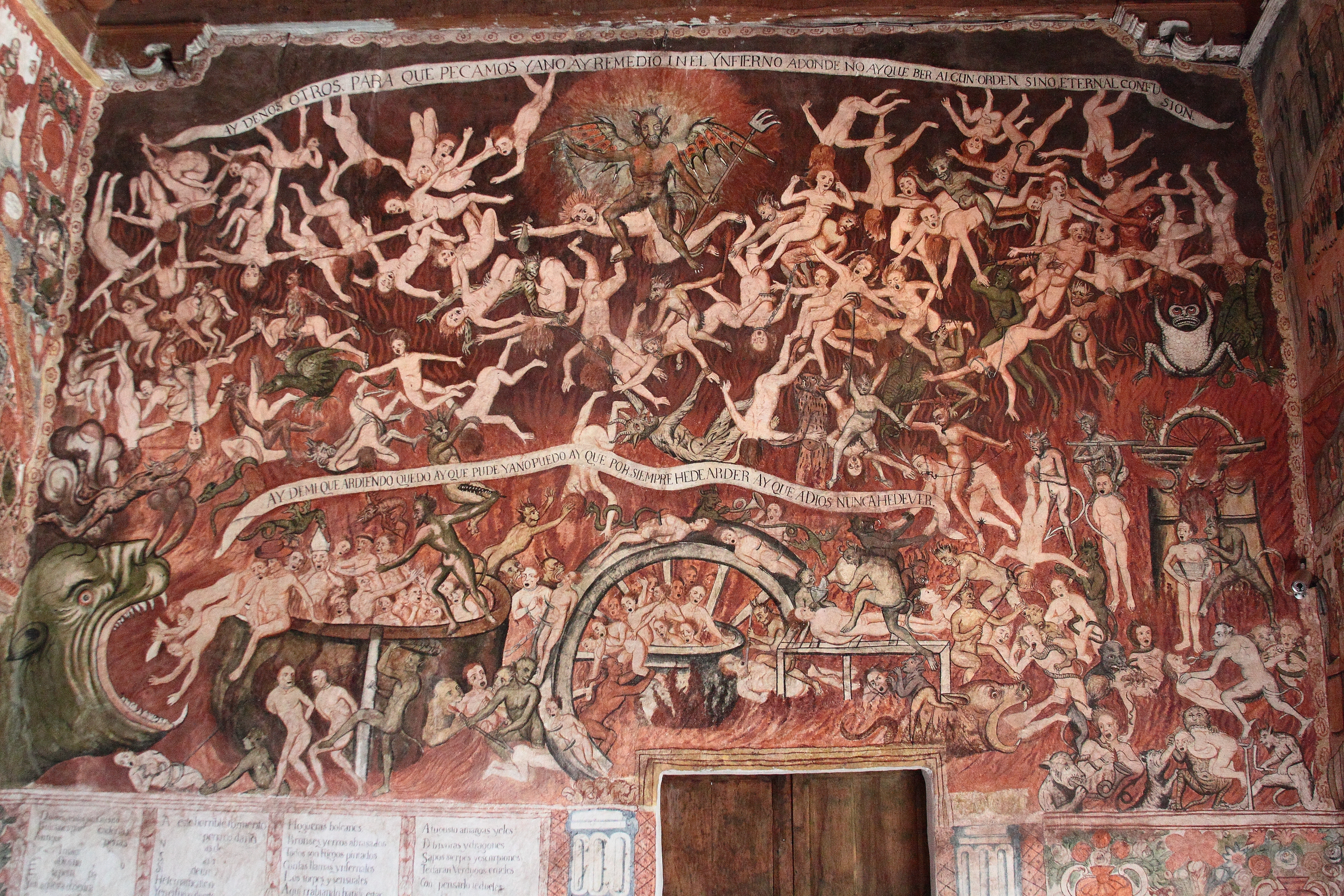
Fresco - Saint John The Baptist of Huaro

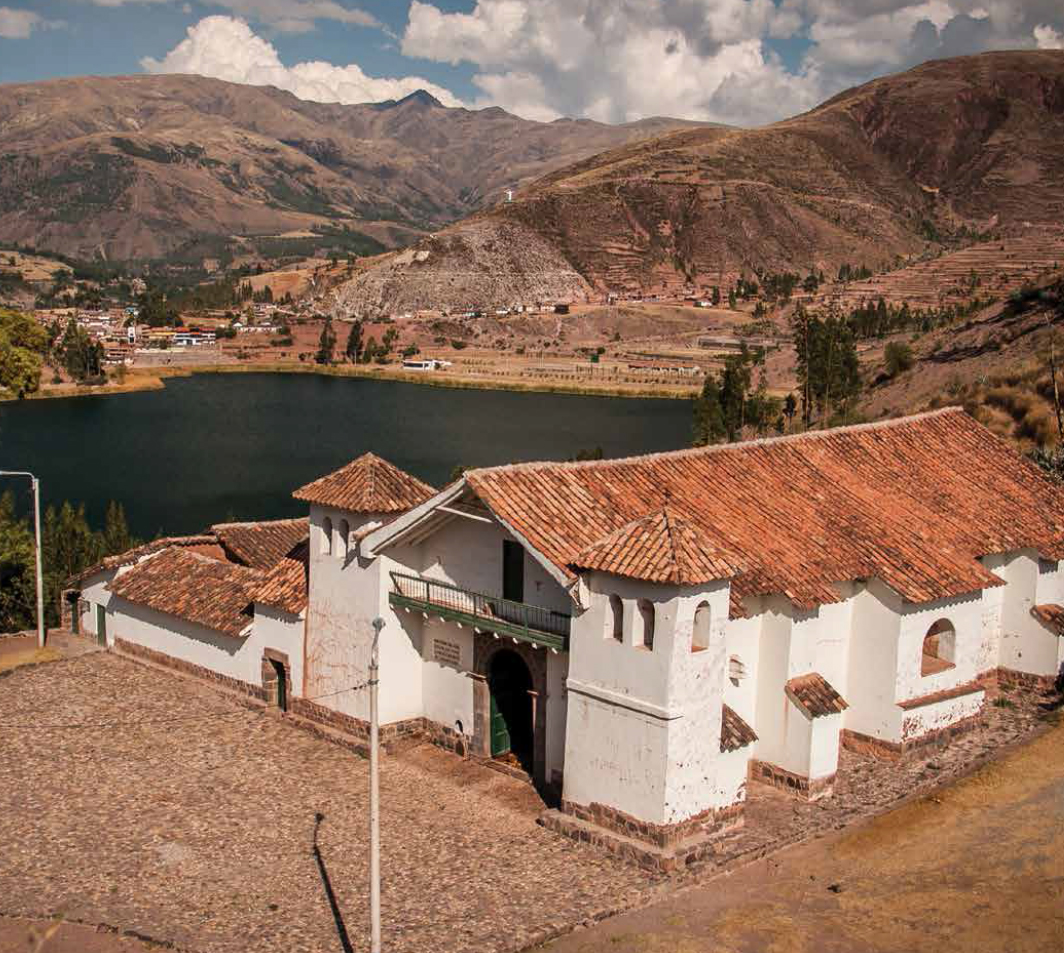
Chapel Canincunca of Urcos

The small town of Huaro is located 4 km south of Andahuaylillas. Its white church dedicated to John the Baptist was built at the end of the 17th century. Its structure, made up of a single nave, is of classic style. Its façade is enlivened by indigenous decorations and flanked by a bell gable. Inside, the Renaissance altar is among the oldest of Peru. However, the magnificent pair of frescos made by Tadeo Escalante, situated on both sides of the entrance gate, is undoubtedly the most fascinating artwork in the church.

=== Canincunca Chapel - Urcos ===
The Canincunca chapel dedicated to the Virgin of Candelaria was probably built at the beginning of the 17th century for the purpose of evangelizing the indigenous populations. It stands above Urcos´ lake on a significant pre-Hispanic site. The cemetery that sits on the hill behind the chapel holds remains that date back to the Incan Empire. The inside of the chapel contains an Andean Baroque iconography such as representations of viscachas and a representation of the Virgin of Candelaria.

== Long Route ==
=== Saint John the Baptist Church - Ccatcca ===
The small town of Ccatcca boasts of a splendid baroque church dedicated to Saint John the Baptist.

=== Saint Paul Church - Ocongate ===
The church shows aspects of churrigueresque baroque as well as neoclassicism. It contains several paintings of the famous Cusquenian painter Diego Quispe Tito.

=== Saint Francis of Assisi Church - Marcapata ===
The little town of Marcapata situated in a beautiful place between the Andes and the Amazonian forest is renowned for its thermal springs (the hottest in Peru). Its church, dedicated to Saint Francis of Assisi, is made entirely of adobe adorned with a thatch roof. A small garden hidden behind a wall of bricks decorates the outside of the church. Remarkable paintings representing persons, animals, and plants cover the walls and the ceiling of the church.

== Other sites of interest on the Route ==
There are several sites of interest unrelated to the baroque churches on the Andean Baroque Route such as the pre-Hispanic archaeological sites of Tipón and Piquillakta located between Cusco and Andahuaylillas or Mount Ausangate, renowned for its hiking trails and its Qoyllurit'i festival.
