= Jacob Caetano =

Angolan militant and politician

Jacob "Monstro Imortal" Caetano
- Born: João Jacob Caetano; 4 April 1941; Piri, Portuguese Angola (now Angola)
- Died: after 27 May 1977 (aged 36); Luanda, Angola
- Occupations: militant; activist; politician
- Spouse: Luísa Mateus Pereira Inglês Ferreira
- Children: 1

João Jacob "Monstro Imortal" Caetano (4 April 1941 – 1977) was an Angolan militant and politician who was a participant in the Angolan War of Independence and the Angolan Civil War. During his military career, he was promoted to the post of general and was vice-commander of the general staff of the People's Armed Forces of Liberation of Angola (FAPLA) and commander of the 9th Brigade of Mobilized Marines of the Special Forces of FAPLA. During his political career, he was a member of the Central Committee of the Movimento Popular de Libertação de Angola (MPLA) and a member of the leadership of the orthodox Communist Nitista-Fractionalist faction.

== Biography ==
Caetano was born on 4 April 1941 in the small town of Piri, to a peasant family from the municipality of Dembos, currently in Bengo province.

During the War for Independence, Caetano participated in numerous confrontation with the colonial Portuguese troops and militants from the National Liberation Front of Angola (FNLA). He was sent by the MPLA to Congo-Kinshasa to receive training in 1962. While there, he also became a member of the MPLA's football team.

He became a part of the first group of militants of the People's Armed Forces of Liberation of Angola (EPLA; which afterwards became FAPLA), taking leadership positions and commanding detachments of the armed wing of the MPLA. He was one of the first people who identified Mobutu Sese Seko as an adversary of the MPLA. Due to this, he was arrested by the police of Congo-Kinshasa, but was able to escape and went to Congo-Brazavile. From 1964 onward, he was a part of the MPLA's leadership, participating in the military/political meetings of the party in their headquarters in exile in Brazzaville.

He participated in reconnaissance units in the north of Angola in 1963 and in military operations in Cabinda in 1965. He commanded a guerrilla squadron named after Cuban revolutionary Camilo Cienfuegos. In 1966, the Cienfuegos Squadron, under his command, was able to establish itself militarily in the province of Luanda, which became known as one of the most crucial and most successful operations by FAPLA/EPLA before the 1970s.

After the feat, Caetano became one of the main commanders of the 1st Military-Politic Region (Luanda, Dembos e Norte Angolano) of the MPLA/EPLA. He came to be recognized by the soldiers for his courage and capacity for combat, he survived and left victorious after participating in the ambushes by the armed wing of the FNLA the Exército de Libertação Nacional de Angola (ELNA). They gave him the nickname "Monstro Imortal" (Portuguese for "Immortal Monster", given due to his almost seemingly mythical invincibility).

During the preparations for the 1st Congress of the MPLA, he was invited to coordinate plenary sessions for the party in Zambia in 1971 and for training sessions as a military official in Czechoslovakia (Military Academy of Brno). In 1972, he became a member of the delegation for negotiations in Kinshasa with the FNLA, along with Agostinho Neto and Lúcio Lara.

During this period, however, the MPLA went through an intense internal political dispute that had turned into, between 1972 and 1974, the Active Revolt and the Eastern Revolt. The disputes were instigated by anti-colonial hard-liners in Brazzaville, in 1972, and had created conspiratorial themes that would dominate the direction of the party during the height of the dispute. Large portions of the party had identified the recent and constant military defeats as having emanated from a purported "white-mestico elite", and who had identified as the main culprits Lúcio Lara, his wife Ruth Lara, Iko Carreira, and Agostinho Neto's wife, Maria Eugénia Neto. The rebels ultimately captured Lúcio Lara, who was the number 2 of the party, in an operation carried out by Caetano, and who had covert support from José Eduardo dos Santos, who had already aspired to take command of the party and establish movement leaders who were entirely non-white. The rebellion gave command of the MPLA to Santos, but was put down rapidly by Agostinho Neto, who later gave amnesty to those involved, including Caetano.

On 25 April 1974, the Carnation Revolution overthrew the regime of António Salazar and hastened the decolonization of the Portuguese colonies in Africa. On 1 August, the EPLA became FAPLA. With the creation of the new armed forces, Caetano assumed command posts in the Northern Front, which included the 1st and 2nd Military-Politic Regions (including Cabinda).

On 8 November 1974, he became part of the "delegation of 26" of the party, led by Lara, and had the historic first visit of a MPLA delegation that was officially received in Luanda. The arrival of Lara's delegation, that also had Caetano, was received very enthusiastically by a crowd of militants, whom broke the barriers and went onto the runway at Luanda's Quatro de Fevereiro Airport as their plane arrived. The sight of Lara had served to prepare them for when Agostinho Neto made his first visit to Luanda after the Carnation Revolution. This visit contributed to the MPLA rapidly gaining power in Luanda.

At the signing of the Alvor Agreement, which established the parameters of the partition of power during the process of independence for Angola, Caetano was named by the MPLA to compose the military hierarchy of the transitional government, keeping with one of the Area Commands, together with Pedro Timóteo "Barreiro" Kiakanwa (FNLA) and "Edmundo Rocha" Sabino Sandele (UNITA).

After March 1975, the anti-colonial war transformed into a civil war between the MPLA, the FNLA, and the União Nacional para a Independência Total de Angola (UNITA). Angola's independence was declared by the MPLA on 11 November 1975. Agostinho Neto thus became president of the People's Republic of Angola. With the opening of general, Caetano became one of the vice-commanders of the General State Staff of FAPLA. In November 1975, he was sent to Porto Amboim, maintaining direct contact with President Agostinho Neto in relation to the collapse of the southern and central fronts that had been under the pressure of South African and UNITA troops. The situation grew to include Cuban military intervention, that came as assistance to Caetano's troops.

Afterwards, he commanded the 9th Brigade of Mobilized Marines of the Special Forces of FAPLA, who were the elite defense forces in Luanda. He strongly contributed to the formation of class consciousness in FAPLA, creating the framework for political education in the branches of the military.

Politically, Caetano aligned more with Nito Alves, with whom was his immediate superior in the 1st Military-Politic Region during the 1960s and 1970s, along with being from the same hometown of Dembos. Caetano became one of the leaders of an orthodox communist opposition group called the Fraccionist-Nitista faction, that proclaimed that Angola urgently needed to make a transition to the Soviet communist model of governance. With these positions, the opposition group became one of Agostinho Neto's fiercest critics and of his position towards a moderate transition to socialism/communism through a nationalist route. Along with this, the group called for the continuance of class struggle that would take the form of debate against a purported "white-mestico" leadership and elite.

At the beginning of 1977, Caetano joined in on plans for a coup d'état by the Nitista faction, being one of the key figures of the conspiracy, along with Nito Alves, José Jacinto Van-Dúnem, Sita Valles, David Minerva Machado, Arsénio Totó Sihanouk, Luís dos Passos, and Eduardo Ernesto Bakalof. In planning for action, he was attached to the 9th Brigade with the role of shock troops during the coup attempt. Regardless, he had been included in the committee of the Central Committee of the MPLA to investigate the activities of the Nitistas. He would, however, regularly inform Alves about the actions and intentions of the government. His membership in the faction was kept hidden entirely. He sought to keep this secrecy and abstained from making declarations and public meetings, only appearing in important, clandestine meetings.

On 21 May, Alves and Van-Dúnem were expelled from the MPLA. Days after, on 23 May, a meeting of the 9th Brigade required the reintegration of Nitista directors in the party and the Central Committee. On 24 May, Alves held the last secret meeting. The plan had also included the planned assassinations of Neto, Lara, Carreira, Saíde Mingas, and Lopo do Nascimento. The following day, Alves had a separate meeting with Caetano, who would have been named as Minister of Defense in a hypothetical Fraccionist-Nitista government.

The coup attempt began on the morning of 27 May. Shaded vehicles from the 9th Brigade and a protest of the residents of the Sambizanga neighbourhood of Luanda were signals to initiate the coup. Going by the plan, the Nitistas occupied the Cadeia de São Paulo prison and Rádio Nacional de Angola's station. Various prominent figures in Neto's government were taken hostage. Neto, Nascimento, Lara, and Carreira, however, were not found.

Angola's intelligence agency, the Directory of Information and Security of Angola (DISA) and the Cuban troops became involved in skirmishes and confrontations to dispel the rebellion. The Nitista leaders attempted to hide in Dembos, but DISA and the Cuban troops pursued them. Caetano was one of the first to be captured. The exact date and the circumstances of his death are not known, but he is presumed to have died in Luanda in 1977.

== Personal life ==
On 26 February 1972, while in Brazzaville, he married fellow militant Luísa Mateus Pereira Inglês Ferreira, who went by the codenome Luísa Pensar Primeiro. After his death, she served as a deputy for the MPLA at the Angolan National Assembly, with her being a member of the assembly until her death from natural causes in 2004. With Luísa, they had a daughter, Florbela Caetano. His nephew, Mário Caetano, also became a politician.

== Later declarations & reburial ==
On 26 May 2021, Angolan president João Lourenço expressed his "sincere regrets" and apologized on behalf of the state after a speech in which he mentioned Caetano.

On 13 June 2022, the remains of Caetano were buried in Luanda, at Alto das Cruzes cemetery, in what was described as a solemn ceremony. President Lourenço was represent by his security service and military cabinet chief, Francisco Furtado, and had government representatives such as Minister of Justice Francisco Manuel de Queiróz, Minister of the Interior Eugénio Laborinho, and by Telecommunications Minister Manuel Homem. Florbela Caetano, his daughter, thanked the president for the act of reparations to her family.
