= 1977 Angolan coup attempt =

Failed coup in angola

1977 Angolan coup d'état attempt
Date	27 May 1977
Location	Angola
Result	Coup failed

Belligerents
People's Republic of Angola: MPLA; Supported by: Cuba	MPLA Action Committee Supported by: Soviet Union

Commanders and leaders
Agostinho Neto; Lúcio Lara; Iko Carreira; Ludy Kissassunda; Henrique Onambwé; Saíde Mingas †	Nito Alves (executed); Sita Valles (executed); José Jacinto Van-Dúnem (executed); Jacob Caetano (executed)

Casualties and losses
	2,000—70,000 executed

The 1977 Angolan coup d'état attempt was a failed attempt by the Angolan interior minister Nito Alves to overthrow the government of Agostinho Neto. It took place on 27 May.

== Background ==
By the late 1970s, Alves had become a powerful member of the government and the People's Movement for the Liberation of Angola (MPLA). He had successfully put down Daniel Chipenda's Eastern Revolt and the Active Revolt during the War of Independence. By 1975, factionalism within the MPLA had become a major challenge to Neto's power and so Neto gave Alves the task of once again clamping down on dissent. Alves shut down the Cabral and Henda Committees and expanded his influence within the MPLA through his control of the nation's newspapers and state-run television. He visited the Soviet Union in October 1976, and may have obtained Soviet support for a coup against Neto. By the time he returned, Neto had grown suspicious of Alves' growing power and sought to neutralize him and his followers. Neto called a plenum meeting of the Central Committee of the MPLA. There, he formally designated the party as Marxist–Leninist, abolished the Interior Ministry, and established a Commission of Enquiry. Neto used the commission to target the Nitistas with accusations of fractionism, and ordered the commission to issue a report of its findings in March 1977. Alves and Chief of Staff José Jacinto Van-Dúnem, his political ally, began planning a coup d'état against Neto.

Alves and Van-Dunem planned to arrest Neto on 21 May before he arrived at a meeting of the Central Committee and before the Commission of Enquiry released its report on the activities of the Nitistas. However, the MPLA changed the location of the meeting shortly before its scheduled start, throwing the plotters' plans into disarray. Alves attended the meeting and faced the commission anyway. The commission released its report, accusing him of fractionism. Alves fought back, denouncing Neto for not aligning Angola with the Soviet Union. After twelve hours of debate, the party voted 26 to 6 to dismiss Alves and Van-Dunem from their positions.

== Coup attempt ==
In support of Alves and the coup, ten armored cars with the 8th Brigade of the People's Armed Forces of Liberation of Angola (FAPLA) broke into São Paulo Prison at 4 AM, killing the prison warden and freeing more than 150 Nitistas, including 11 who had been arrested only a few days before. The 8th Brigade then took control of the radio station in Luanda and announced their coup, calling themselves the MPLA Action Committee and calling on citizens to show their support for the coup by demonstrating in front of the presidential palace. The Nitistas captured Bula (José Manuel Magalhães Paiva) and Dangereux (Paulo da Silva Mungungu), generals loyal to Neto, but Neto had moved his base of operations from the palace to the Ministry of Defence in fear of such an uprising. Cuban troops loyal to Neto retook the palace and marched to the radio station. They succeeded in taking the radio station and proceeded to the barracks of the 8th Brigade, recapturing it by 1:30 PM. While the Cuban force captured the palace and radio station, the Nitistas kidnapped seven leaders within the government and the military, shooting and killing six.

== Aftermath ==
The Angolan government arrested tens of thousands of suspected Nitistas from May to November and tried them in secret courts overseen by Defense Minister Iko Carreira. Those who were found guilty, including Van-Dunem, his wife Sita Valles, Jacob Caetano (the head of FAPLA's 8th Brigade), and political commissar Eduardo Evaristo, were shot and buried in secret graves. At least 2000 followers (or alleged followers) of Nito Alves were estimated to have been killed by Cuban and MPLA troops in the aftermath, with some estimates claiming as many as 70,000 dead. The coup attempt had a lasting effect on Angola's foreign relations. Alves had opposed Neto's foreign policy of non-alignment, evolutionary socialism, and multiracialism and favoured stronger relations with the Soviet Union, which Alves wanted to grant military bases in Angola. While Cuban soldiers actively helped Neto put down the coup, both Alves and Neto believed the Soviets opposed Neto. Cuban Armed Forces Minister Raúl Castro sent an additional 4000 troops to prevent further dissension within the MPLA's ranks and met with Neto in August in a display of solidarity. In contrast, Neto's distrust of the Soviet leadership increased, and relations with the Soviets worsened. In December, the MPLA held its first party congress and changed its name to the MPLA-Worker's Party (MPLA-PT). The attempted coup took a toll on its membership. In 1975, the MPLA had reached 200,000 members, but after the first party congress, that number decreased to 30,000.
