= Sita Valles =

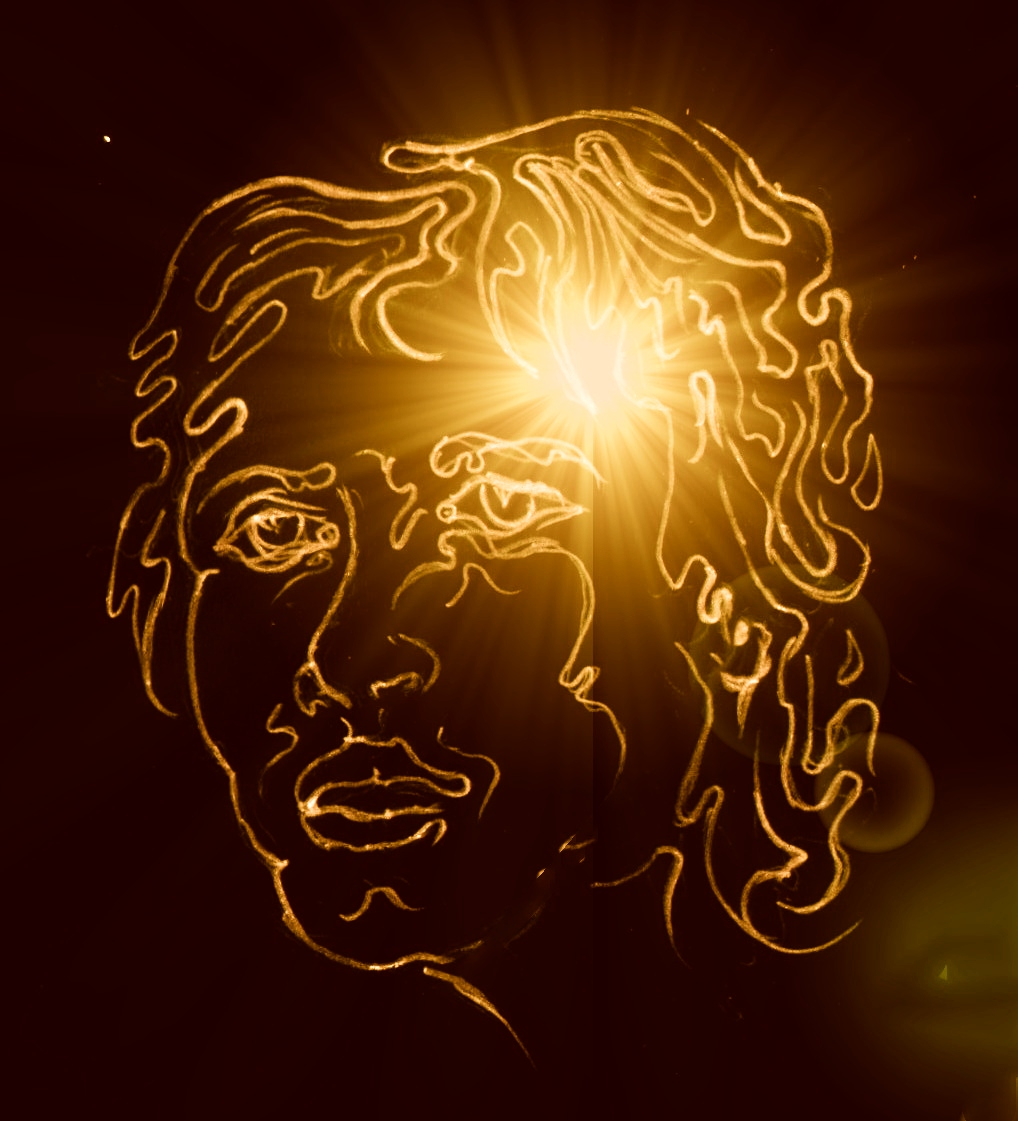
- Sita Valles by Dom Martin
- Born: 23 August 1951; Cabinda, Portuguese Angola
- Died: 1 August 1977 (aged 25); Luanda, People's Republic of Angola
- Cause of death: Execution by firing squad
- Political party: PCP (1971–1975); MPLA (1975–1977)
- Spouse: José Jacinto Van-Dúnem
- Children: 1

Sita Maria Dias Valles (23 August 1951 – c. 1 August 1977) was an Angolan revolutionary, doctor and member of the Portuguese Communist Party, in charge of the Communist Students' League. She is best known for her participation in the 1977 Angolan coup attempt in May 1977, and was later executed presumably in August 1977.

== Early life ==
Born in Luanda in 1951, Sita Valles was the daughter of Edgar Francisco da Purificação Valles, a government agronomist, and Maria Lúcia Aida Florinda Dias Valles, a housewife, a prosperous Goan Catholic couple based in what was then Portuguese Angola.

Seen in her time as pretty, intelligent and charming, she was also bold and independent, according to her biographers. She rejected her Catholic upbringing and began her political activity by joining the Faculty of Medicine of Luanda, where she briefly associated with Maoist groups before switching to a pro-Soviet position.

Reviewer Adolfo Mascarenhas describes her from a photograph he encountered in her 2018 English-language biography: "...there she was, more standing than leaning on a Morris Minor sedan of the 1950s, tallish, determined jaw, crossed legs, a shortish white skirt topped by a polar necked long sleeved blouse."

When she continued her studies in Lisbon, from 1971, she became part of the network of Communist militants and in the Communist Students' League. There, she would grow into one of Portuguese Communism's most prominent figures, next only to Zita Seabra.

== Role following the Carnation Revolution ==
At the time of the Carnation Revolution of 25 April 1974, which paralleled the upheaval in Angola following the overthrow of Marcello Caetano's government in Portugal, Valles was participating in a congress in Moscow. She decided to return to Angola in the summer of 1975 to participate in the revolution.

In Luanda she was considered to be part of the ideologically more-orthodox wing of the People's Movement for the Liberation of Angola (MPLA), seen as pro-Soviet, which was directed by Nito Alves and José Van-Dunem. By 1976, Alves was the new MPLA government's interior minister while José Jacinto Van-Dúnem, an ex-political prisoner, was a key political commissar in the army. Sita Valles became "a leading functionary in the government’s Department of Mass Organization". Valles married Van-Dunem in 1977 and had a son with him, born on 18 February 1977.

== Death ==
Following Angola's independence, Alves took the helm of a new political movement within the People's Movement for the Liberation of Angola known as Fraccionismo; this movement had ruled the country since the independence of Angola. This movement surfaced as a difference of opinion that arose in the very heart of the MPLA after the independence of Angola, from President Agostinho Neto. It was very critical of Neto's inner circle, accusing some of its members of illicit enrichment and corruption.

In Luanda, an attempted coup d'etat was launched on 27 May 1977. The attempt was foiled due to the support of the Cuban Revolutionary Armed Forces, then stationed in Angola. Alves, van Dunem and Valles were deposed from their official positions. The attempted coup was followed by a period of two years of bloody pursuit of (real and supposed) followers and sympathizers of Nito Alves leading to tens of thousands of killings.

Valles and her husband were among those killed during this period. She was accused of being one of the brains of the alleged putsch of 27 May 1977, tried in secret and found guilty.

According to her biographer Leonor Figueiredo, Sita Valles was executed by a firing squad at 5 a.m. on 1 August 1977. Her execution was preceded by her abject torture and rape by men of the Angola Information and Security Directorate (DISA), the regime's political police. It is said she refused being blindfolded, facing her death with extreme heroism. A tractor flattened the ground of the ditch where her corpse was buried so that it would not be found.

== Aftermath ==
In September 2020, the BBC carried an interview with João Ernesto Van Dunem (the son of Sita Valles) in the Newshour Sounds programme titled "My parents were killed in Angola's secret massacre".

Following the English translation of a biography on her life in 2018, there has been an interest about her life in her parents' native Goa.

== Biographies and studies ==
- Leonor Figueiredo, Sita Valles: Revolucionária, Comunista até à Morte (Alêtheia Editores, 2014) [translated as Sita Valles: A Revolutionary until Death by David Addison Smith (Goa 1556, 2018). The Portuguese author, a journalist since 1981, formerly with the Correio da Manhã till the end of the 1980s, and then for 21 years on the editorial board of the Diário de Notícias till January 2009.
- Leonor Figueiredo, Secret Files of the Decolonization of Angola (Alêtheia Editores, 2009). This study investigated, gathered evidences, and looked for decades-old memories of Valles, José Van-Dunem, Nito Alves and an unknown number of victims which is believed to have probably exceeded 20,000. The study records a brutal history which had grown into a myth for a generation.
