= José Jacinto Van-Dúnem =

Angolan militant, politician and anticolonial activist

- Born: José Jacinto da Silva Vieira Dias Van-Dúnem; 29 August 1939; Moçâmedes, Portuguese Angola (now Angola)
- Died: 8 July 1977 (aged 37); Luanda, Angola
- Education: University of Luanda
- Occupations: militant; activist; politician
- Spouse: Sita Valles
- Children: 1

José Jacinto da Silva Vieira Dias Van-Dúnem, also known as Zé Van-Dúnem Filósofo (29 August 1939 – 8 July 1977) was an Angolan militant, politician, and anticolonial activist.

He was the political commissioner of the general staff of the People's Armed Forces of Liberation of Angola (FAPLA), a member of the Central Committee of the MPLA, and political commissioner of the Eastern Front (III Região Político-Militar). He actively participated in the Angolan war for Independence and the Angolan Civil War.

A member of the orthodox communist wing of the MPLA, Van-Dúnem was also one of the leaders of the Nitista faction. Captured in the process of the repression of an attempted coup d'état of the Angolan state, he was killed along with his wife Sita Valles.

== Biography ==
The first child of Antónia Vieira Dias and Mateus Van-Dúnem, José Jacinto Van-Dúnem came from a family connected to the founding members of the modern Angolan nationalist movement, especially in regard to his grandfather, Manuel Pereira dos Santos Van-Dúnem, and his great-uncle, Manuel Inácio dos Santos Torres Vieira Dias. His sister, Francisca Van Dunem, was the first Black government minister in Portugal, serving as the Minister of Internal Administration and Minister of Justice.

Van-Dúnem received his primary school education at a school in Sumbe as his family resided in locations based on his fathers’ public employment. He moved to Luanda and went to live with his uncle so he could study at the Liceu Nacional Paulo Dias de Novais (currently the Escola Angola Quiluanje). He later studied at the Faculty of Medicine of the University of Luanda. From the middle of the 1960s, due to family influences, he became a part of the anticolonial struggle with the Marxist movement MPLA, leaving his studies at the Faculty of Medicine.

He participated in the Angolan War of Independence as an official in the intelligentsia of the People's Army for the Liberation of Angola (EPLA) and a coordinator of the Clandestine Regional Committee of Luanda (CRL), organizing a cell network with the MPLA in Luanda. His intellectual nature earned him the nickname "Filósofo" (Portuguese for philosopher). He also participated in armed action, including capturing some aircraft in 1969.

As part of a military intelligence mission, Van-Dúnem enlisted with the colonial Portuguese army in January 1970, gaining access to classified military information. He served in Huambo and in Cuíto with a specialty in cavalry shooting. He organized the theft of arms and ammunition from military barracks in Cuíto, which led to his imprisonment in Luanda and afterwards in Moçâmedes. Despite being imprisoned due to his attempt to obtain weapons for armed rebellion, he gained notoreity and respect among the EPLA troops for his personal courage and adventurous inclination to take risks.

With the Carnation Revolution in Portugal on 25 April 1974, the decolonization process had begun. Van-Dúnem was freed, and he became, along with Nito Alves and Daniel Chipenda, the most influential figures in the MPLA for their participation and leadership in the fight for independence. With Alves, both him and Van-Dúnem initiated the reforms of the 1st Military Police Region (Luanda, Dembos and Norte Angolano) of the MPLA and the reactivation of the 4th region (Malanje and Cuanza). They were also able to reactivate the important cell organizations in Luanda, the Operational Command of Luanda (COL), and partially stabilize the situation in the capital, organizing patrols to maintain order, feats that would guarantee the success of the Agostinho Neto wing of the party during the Lundoji Conference. In the conference in July 1974, Van-Dúnem was elected to the party's Central Committee and became the youngest member of MPLA's leadership.

In March 1975, Agostinho Neto named him the national political commissioner and sub-chief of the general staff of FAPLA. In his post, he was the third in command of the military hierarchy of the party, after Armed Forces head Iko Carreira and head of general staff João Luís Xietu. On 11 November 1975, Angola's independence was declared, with the MPLA as the ruling party. A long civil war began afterwards between the new Angolan state and various rival groups. Van-Dúnem actively participated in the battles of 1975 and 1976.

He became a member of the MPLA's delegation to the 25th Congress of the Communist Party of the Soviet Union, held from 24 February to 5 March 1976, led by Nito Alves. Van-Dúnem became even more ideologically aligned with the Soviet model and advocated for a more orthodox form of communism.

From March 1976 onwards, Van-Dúnem began to criticize influential leaders of the party and of the Angolan state, especially rallying against a supposed "white-mestiço elite", purportedly exemplified by now Minister of Defense Iko Carreira, as well as MPLA vice-president and president of the Revolutionary Council Lúcio Lara. He later implicated Agostinho Neto himself and his government more broadly as targets of his criticisms. These criticisms made him lose influence in the party, being sent to the 3rd Military Police Region.

In 1976, Van-Dúnem married Sita Valles, another activist in the MPLA that had overseen the youth movement and peoples' movement of the party in Luanda. They had a son whom they named João Ernesto "Che" Valles Van-Dúnem, his name being a tribute to Che Guevara.

Van-Dúnem was one of the leaders of the Nitista movement, a fact which led him to be removed from his positions with the party and the state between 1976 and 1977. He was one of the leaders of the 1977 Angolan coup attempt. Captured during the retaliation by the state against the coup attempt, both Van-Dúnem and his wife, Sita Valles, were murdered.
