= Communist Organization of Angola =

Angolan Maoist party

Communist Organization of Angola Organização Comunista de Angola
- Founded: 1976
- Dissolved: 1977
- Split from: MPLA
- Preceded by: Amilcar Cabral Committees
- Succeeded by: Front for Democracy
- Newspaper: Vanguarda Operaria
- Ideology: Maoism; Anti-imperialism
- Political position: Far-left

The Communist Organization of Angola (Portuguese: Organização Comunista de Angola; OCA) was an Angolan Maoist political party. Formed by former members of the suppressed Amílcar Cabral Committees, the OCA opposed the government of Agostinho Neto and the MPLA. It was fiercely critical of the Cuban intervention in Angola, called for the expulsion of the Cuban Army from the country and for a protracted people's war to resolve the ongoing Angolan Civil War. The organization was suppressed by interior minister Nito Alves in 1977.

== Amílcar Cabral Committees ==
Following the independence of Angola in 1975, the Amílcar Cabral Committees (Portuguese: Comités Amilcar Cabral; CAC) emerged into an environment of lively political debate, alongside several action committees, trade union committees, women's committees and youth committees. The CAC, which had a Maoist and anti-imperialist tendency, held a strong influence in the popular committees of Luanda's slums. After the outbreak of the Angolan Civil War, the CAC fought to expel the National Liberation Front of Angola (FNLA) from Luanda. Although political debate was initially seen by the ruling People's Movement for the Liberation of Angola (MPLA) as a sign of the newly independent state's strength, by 1976, it began to crack down on freedom of speech with the aim of establishing a one-party state.

In March 1976, President Agostinho Neto began nationalising property and bringing the economy of Angola under state ownership. This move was resisted by African nationalists and the far-left, including the CAC and Henda Committees. The CAC were the first organization to face political repression, under accusations of factionalism. Interior minister Nito Alves, who had previously sympathised with the far-left Maoists of the CAC and Henda Committees, directed the suppression of them. Alves first attempted to integrate the committees into his own structures, then forcibly dissolved those that refused and arrested their members.

== Communist Organization of Angola ==
To escape the repression, in April 1976, the CAC reorganized itself into the Communist Organization of Angola (Portuguese: Organização Comunista de Angola; OCA). The OCA was a small far-left Maoist group, which had developed as an outgrowth of the Portuguese Maoist movement in Angola. Many of its members were former members of both the Amílcar Cabral and Henda Committees. It was composed largely of white and mixed-race people, as well as some black African members.

The OCA took a sectarian position against the rule of the MPLA and strongly criticised the Cuban intervention in Angola, which the OCA depicted as a form of "social imperialism". The OCA supported Enver Hoxha's People's Socialist Republic of Albania, and complained that their events commemorating the Albanian state had been suppressed by the MPLA.

The OCA denounced the MPLA as a "fascist" party and accused "revisionist" elements in the MPLA, allegedly under the control of the Russian and Portuguese Communist Parties, of fomenting bourgeois capitalism under the guise of a workers' party. The OCA believed the Cuban intervention in Angola constituted a capitulation by the MPLA, accusing it of opening the country up to foreign military occupation rather than carrying out what it saw as a necessary protracted people's war. The OCA believed that the Angolan Civil War had become a proxy war between superpowers, which were fighting to divide and conquer Angola. The OCA thus called for the expulsion of the Cuban Army from Angola.

== Suppression ==
In late 1976, the MPLA government moved to suppress the OCA and arrest its members. Nito Alves, who the OCA had denounced as a "social fascist", oversaw the organization's suppression. British journalist Paul Fauvet justified the suppression of the OCA, citing the fact that it was attacking the MPLA and its allies while Angola was facing invasions by Zaire and South Africa. According to Claude Gabriel, the MPLA had suppressed the OCA because it felt threatened by its influence in the slums of Luanda. With the OCA and other political opposition repressed, the MPLA then began consolidating its control over the state, which it justified due to the conditions of the civil war.

Using his ties with the popular power groups, Alves began building his own power and later attempted a coup against Neto's government. Alves claimed that the MPLA had become dominated by right-wing elements and social democrats, who he alleged were allied with the Maoists of the OCA.

Members of the OCA were released after three years in prison in 1980. Former members of the OCA went on to establish the Front for Democracy (Portuguese: Frente para a Democracia; FpD). The FpD later collaborated with the FNLA in a united front against the MPLA, and formed ties with the Portuguese Socialist Party and Left Bloc.

== See also ==
- List of anti-revisionist groups

== Bibliography ==
- Birmingham, David (1978). "The Twenty-Seventh of May: An Historical Note on the Abortive 1977 "coup" in Angola". African Affairs. 77 (309): 554–564. doi:10.1093/oxfordjournals.afraf.a097027. ISSN 0001-9909. JSTOR 721965. OCLC 9971004115.
- Cahen, Michel (2003). "What good is Portugal to an African?". In Lloyd-Jones, Stewart; Costa Pinto, António (eds.). The Last Empire: Thirty Years of Portuguese Decolonisation (PDF). Intellect Books. pp. 83–98. ISBN 1-84150-109-3.
- de Fragoso Vidal, Nuno (2024a). "Agostinho Neto: The MPLA's alchemist, between a rock and a hard place". Cadernos de Estudos Africanos. 47: 11–42. ISSN 2182-7400.
- de Fragoso Vidal, Nuno (2024b). "Left and Right in MPLA's Angolan Socialism". História: Questões & Debates, Curitiba. 72 (2). doi:10.5380/his.v72i2.9613. ISSN 0100-6932.
- Fauvet, Paul (1977). "Angola: The Rise and Fall of Nito Alves". Review of African Political Economy. 4 (9): 88–104. doi:10.1080/03056247808703331. ISSN 0305-6244. OCLC 9974728331.
- Fauvet, Paul (1979). "In defence of the MPLA and the Angolan revolution". Review of African Political Economy. 6 (15–16): 148–153. doi:10.1080/03056247908703405.
- Gabriel, Claude (1980). "In defence of the Angolan masses". Review of African Political Economy. 7 (19): 69–74. doi:10.1080/03056248008703442.
- Lopes, Carlos; Rudebeck, Lars (1988). The socialist ideal in Africa: a debate (Report). Vol. 81. Scandinavian Institute of African Studies.
- Luke, Timothy W. (1982). "Angola and Mozambique: Institutionalizing Social Revolution in Africa". The Review of Politics. 44 (3): 413–436. doi:10.1017/S0034670500046647.
- Saul, John S. (2014). "'When freedom died' in Angola: Alves and after". Review of African Political Economy. 41 (142): 609–622. doi:10.1080/03056244.2014.928279. hdl:10.1080/03056244.2014.928279. ISSN 0305-6244. OCLC 6261335371. S2CID 154204957.
