= Nito Alves =

Angolan Independence Leader

Interior Minister of Angola
- In office 11 November 1975 – 29 October 1976
- President: Agostinho Neto
- Prime Minister: Lopo do Nascimento
- Preceded by: Position established
- Succeeded by: Position abolished (1976–1978); Alexandre Kito (1978–1979)

Personal details
- Born: Bernardo Alves Baptista; 23 July 1945 Piri, Dembos, Portuguese Angola
- Died: 14 July 1977 (aged 31) Luanda, Angola
- Cause of death: Execution by firing squad
- Party: MPLA

Military service
- Allegiance: Angola
- Branch/service: People's Army for the Liberation of Angola
- Years of service: 1966–1977
- Rank: Commander
- Commands: First Region
- Battles/wars: Angolan War of Independence; 1977 Angolan coup attempt

Bernado "Nito" Alves Baptista (23 July 1945 – 14 July 1977) was an Angolan revolutionary and politician who served as the first interior minister of Angola. A hardline member of the People's Movement for the Liberation of Angola (MPLA), Alves is best known for his failed 1977 coup attempt against the government of Agostinho Neto.

During the Angolan War of Independence, Alves fought for the MPLA as a guerrilla in the forests of Dembos, rising through the ranks to become regional commander in the country's north. He developed a reputation as an intransigent Marxist-Leninist, gaining the support of Neto and the MPLA leadership after he vocally denounced Daniel Chipenda's' Eastern Revolt.

With the independence of Angola in 1975, Alves was appointed to head the Ministry of Interior. He used the position to place his loyal followers - known as Nitistas - into positions of power in the new state. But the Nitistas ended up causing a supply chain crisis after stockpiling food, prompting the government to dissolve Alves' ministry. Alves supported fractionism, opposing Neto's foreign policy of nonalignment, evolutionary socialism, and multiracialism.

In May 1977, the MPLA expelled him from the party. He and his supporters broke into a prison, freeing other supporters, and took control of the radio station in Luanda in an attempted coup. Forces loyal to Neto took back the radio and arrested those involved in the coup attempt, with Cuban soldiers actively helping Neto put down the coup. After the failed coup the MPLA undertook a purge designed to eliminate factionalism, during which Alves and several of his supporters were executed.

== Biography ==
In 1945, Nito Alves was born in the Northern Angolan town of Piri. He started his education at an evangelical mission near his hometown, before moving to the Angolan capital of Luanda in 1960 to continue his education. In 1965, he joined the anti-colonial movement, while in his sixth year at school. After a number of his fellow activists were arrested and imprisoned in 1966, he left the capital and joined the MPLA in the forests of Dembos, where anti-colonial guerrillas had been fighting since the outbreak of the Angolan War of Independence.

=== Revolutionary activities ===
In 1967, Alves was put in command of the Centre of Revolutionary Instruction, and by 1971, he had joined the regional leadership under the command of Jacob Caetano. Encouraged by Alves, the Dembos guerrillas began to develop a "certain regionalism" which centred Dembos as the main theatre in the independence war. Already by 1969, they were taking greater casualties than other regions, with the defeat of their southern front resulting in them being cut off from the rest of the anti-colonial movement. The situation moved Caetano to seek aid in Cabinda, leaving Alves as the regional supreme commander.

After the overthrow of the Estado Novo in the Carnation Revolution, in 1974, Alves returned to the Angolan capital. In Luanda, he made contact with other anti-colonial figures, such as José Jacinto Van-Dúnem, and the Portuguese Communist Party, who came to see him as a "genuine revolutionary leader". By this time, the MPLA was beset by factional infighting, with a Congress being held in Lusaka to resolve the conflict through an organisational solution.

Alves was delegated to the Congress, where he gave the impression of being an instransigent Maoist, violently denouncing the factional leader Daniel Chipenda for his Eastern Revolt. Although his interjections won the support of MPLA leader Agostinho Neto, Alves' speeches also lay the foundations of his own divergence from the movement's leadership, as he vocally expressed his desire for the Angolan Revolution to be one of black power. At the subsequent Inter-Regional Conference of Militants, held in the liberated territories of Eastern Angola, Alves called for a "struggle against the bourgeoisie", which he identified in racial terms as White Angolans. Alves' anti-White policies were rejected by the MPLA majority, which upheld multiracialism.

Alves then returned to Luanda, where he set about reorganising the movement, establishing a network of mass organisations according to the principles of "Popular Power". These organisations were often spontaneously self-organised by the grassroots, with inhabitants of the Luanda musseques organising themselves to defend against terrorist attacks by white supremacists and the right-wing National Liberation Front of Angola (FNLA). Alves encouraged the development of these neighbourhood organisations, which culminated in July 1975, when the forces of "Popular Power" expelled the FNLA from Luanda. The success of his organisational efforts earned him the role of Interior Minister in the new People's Republic of Angola, which was established on 11 November 1975.

=== Interior Minister ===
As Interior Minister, Alves continued the work he had started in the Luandan anti-colonial network. In opposition to what he saw as a class collaborationist tendency in the MPLA, he declared himself a "partisan of unflinching class struggle", attracting support from anti-colonial activists in the bairros, radical student circles and Portuguese Communists. During this period, his friends noted him to have regularly stated that "history has reserved for me the heavy task of leading the working class to power", while often quoting from "the immortal Lenin, whose work I intend to continue".

His positions often aligned with the Communist Organization of Angola (OCA), a Maoist organisation which often denounced the MPLA as "bourgeois" and which was hostile to the "social imperialist" intervention of Soviet and Cuban forces in the Angolan Civil War. But despite their ideological similarities, Alves was a key figure in the suppression of the OCA, which likewise denounced him as a "social-fascist". Alves himself was heavily inspired by the works of Enver Hoxha and Mao Zedong, but had been forced to renounce Maoism after the People's Republic of China backed UNITA. After attending the 25th Congress of the Communist Party of the Soviet Union, Alves shifted his loyalties towards the Soviet Union, becoming known in the Western press as "Moscow's man in Luanda".

Alves used his position as Interior Minister to appoint his followers - known as Nitistas - to offices within the new government. Alves held premature elections for the Popular Bairro Committees (CPBs), resulting in a low turnout of roughly 10%, with Nitistas coming to dominate the organs of "Popular Power". Despite efforts by Neto to recover the committees, the Nitista CPBs would neglect or even obstruct initiatives to improve housing, public utilities and healthcare. Nitistas were also put in positions of command in the People's Armed Forces of Liberation of Angola (FAPLA), and installed as regional commissars in every region. The Nitista David Aires Machado, who Alves praised as a "genuine revolutionary", also took control of the Ministry of Internal Trade. Corruption quickly became rampant within the ministry, causing food shortages. As supply chains broke down under their management, Nitista organs began stockpiling food in warehouses, leaving it to rot while store shelves remained empty. Meanwhile, Nitista cells were established in all mass organizations and Nitistas took control of the Diario de Luanda newspaper.

By October 1976, Alves' behaviour had brought accusations of fractionism against him by the MPLA central committee. Nitistas were subsequently removed from their posts, their organs were suppressed and brought under government control, and it was decided that future elections would only be permitted "where MPLA structures are sufficiently strong, organizationally stable and mature". Nito Alves himself was also removed from his post and the Ministry of Interior was abolished, bringing its functions under the direct control of the Prime minister and President of Angola. Although Alves and a number of his supporters were kept on the central committee, they began plotting to overthrow the government, contradicting his own earlier declaration that "the coup d'etat, the putsch, is totally alien to socialism".

=== Fractionism ===
The Nitistas immediately began preparations for a coup, holding meetings and organising its network for the planned action. The plan was to arrange a mass demonstration against food shortages, which they would then take as justification for a putsch against the government. They marked several government figures for execution and pre-planned the formation of a new government, with Alves as its President and other leading Nitistas as its ministers.

Alves himself published his Thirteen Theses in my Defence, which was distributed en-masse to the public. In an open break with the government's democratic centralism, Alves claimed without evidence that the MPLA had been taken over by "right-wing forces, by social-democracy allied to the Maoists" and called for a renewed "class struggle". He also began directing attacks against the "petty bourgeois" Portuguese Angolans, who he called "Lisbon's new colonisers", blocking the arrival of Portuguese contract workers to the country and even overseeing the murder of some Portuguese technicians.

As Nitistas rose up in open mutiny against the government, the Directorate of Information and Security of Angola (DISA) carried out a series of raids on the bairros, while the MPLA majority and many civilians denounced the activities of the Nitista-dominated CPBs. When the MPLA Central Committee met on 20 May 1977, the Nitistas began their preparations for an immediate coup, but failed to carry it out after the committee unexpectedly changed its meeting place. When the Committee found Nito Alves guilty of fractionism, he responded with a series of unevidenced counter-claims against the government, which he variously accused of corruption, nepotism, "social democratic Maois[m]", diamond smuggling and even of being controlled by the CIA. In what amounted to a "virtual declaration of war", Alves declared that:

if there really is factionalism inside the MPLA, then it is amongst you, the present leadership, that it will have to be looked for. As for me, I am the revolution incarnate. History has reserved for me the right of carrying through the process of this revolution. The conditions I put are the only ones possible, the only ones acceptable: the immediate resignation of the political committee, suspension of the central committee, and the appointment of a revolutionary politico-military committee to take the leadership of the country into its hands.

Even still, Augistinho Neto attempted to dissuade Alves from mutiny, asking him to consider the need for "national unity" in the face of the "imperialist threat" to the country. But Alves remained intransigent, and on 21 May, he was expelled from the MPLA.

=== Coup and purge ===
The Nitistas set the date of the coup for 25 May, when they were to capture the prisons, radio stations and newspaper offices in Luanda. Alves initially drew up a list of enemies in the government to be executed, but later decided that simply imprisoning the "reactionary ministers" would be sufficient. But the coup was prematurely aborted, as Nitistas in the military were unconvinced that they had the strength to pull off the operation. Alves responded angrily: "You talk a lot about the 'People' without respect. Now the masses are ready. They're putting their trust in you. And now you don't want to advance'" Alves ordered the Nitista-controlled CPBs to go ahead with the "popular uprising", which he thought would force the Nitista faction of the military into action. He then left the capital for Caxito, where he was presented with a new plan for the coup. With the Nitista faction of the military finally on board, the date of the coup was set for 27 May, and preparations for the mass uprising were put into action.

On the morning of 27 May 1977, the Nitistas attacked São Paulo prison and released its prisoners, while others arrested members of the government and imprisoned them at Sambizanga. They captured the radio station and started broadcasting anti-government appeals, but when they called for a mass demonstration outside the presidential palace, they only managed to bring together 500 people. The military faction was only able to briefly capture one barracks, but it was quickly taken back and most soldiers remained loyal to the government. Alves himself was shocked to find out that Cuban troops in the country had immediately sided with Neto's government, which prompted him to question his "understanding of scientific socialism".

By mid-day, the Angolan army had dispersed the demonstrators at the palace and regained control of the radio station. At 13:30, the mutinous Ninth Armoured Brigade had surrendered and the coup was over. Other Nitista attempts throughout the rest of the country were also neutralised, or were never able to manifest in the first place. But by the time that President Neto declared victory over the coup in a radio broadcast, Nito Alves had already ordered the execution of several leaders of the MPLA and FAPLA; this prompted widespread calls for the coup leaders to themselves be executed.

In the wake of the coup, the MPLA carried out hundreds of arrests in Luanda, Nitistas were purged from office and several Nitista CPBs were dissolved. In the wake of the coup's suppression, the Angolan economy rapidly began to improve and the MPLA was finally united with complete control of the country's political system. While leading Nitistas were captured, Nito Alves fled north. He arrived in his hometown of Piri after six weeks of walking, but was immediately given up to the FAPLA. On 7 July 1977, Alves was arrested, bringing a definitive end to the Nitista insurrection. A military tribunal was established to try Alves and other Nitista leaders. The authorities investigated Alves for collaboration with UNITA, but no evidence of such was found. Alves was executed by firing squad on 14 July 1977.

== Bibliography ==
- Birmingham, David (1978). "The Twenty-Seventh of May: An Historical Note on the Abortive 1977 "coup" in Angola". African Affairs. 77 (309): 554–564. doi:10.1093/oxfordjournals.afraf.a097027. ISSN 0001-9909. JSTOR 721965. OCLC 9971004115.
- Domínguez, Jorge I. (1989). "Support for Revolutionary States". To Make a World Safe for Revolution: Cuba's Foreign Policy. Harvard University Press. pp. 147–183. ISBN 0-674-89325-5. LCCN 88-16556.
- Gunn, Gillian (1990). "Cuba and Angola". In Fauriol, Georges A.; Loser, Eva (eds.). Cuba: The International Dimension. Transaction Publishers. pp. 153–201. ISBN 0-88738-324-6. LCCN 89-27883.
- Fauvet, Paul (1977). "Angola: The Rise and Fall of Nito Alves". Review of African Political Economy. 4 (9): 88–104. doi:10.1080/03056247808703331. ISSN 0305-6244. OCLC 9974728331.
- Pawson, Lara (June 2007). "The 27 May in Angola: a view from below" (PDF). Relações Internacionais (14). NOVA University Lisbon: 1–18. ISSN 1645-9199. OCLC 318075781. Archived from the original (PDF) on 20 July 2011.
- Pawson, Lara (2014). In The Name of The People: Angola's Forgotten Massacre. London: I.B. Tauris. ISBN 9781780769059. OCLC 870285562.
- Pearce, Justin (2016). "Youthful Dissent Challenges Angola's Old Elite". Current History. 115 (781): 175–180. doi:10.1525/curh.2016.115.781.175. ISSN 0011-3530. JSTOR 48614167.
- Saul, John S. (2014). "'When freedom died' in Angola: Alves and after". Review of African Political Economy. 41 (142): 609–622. doi:10.1080/03056244.2014.928279. hdl:10.1080/03056244.2014.928279. ISSN 0305-6244. OCLC 6261335371. S2CID 154204957.
