= Mário Augusto Caetano João =

Mário Caetano
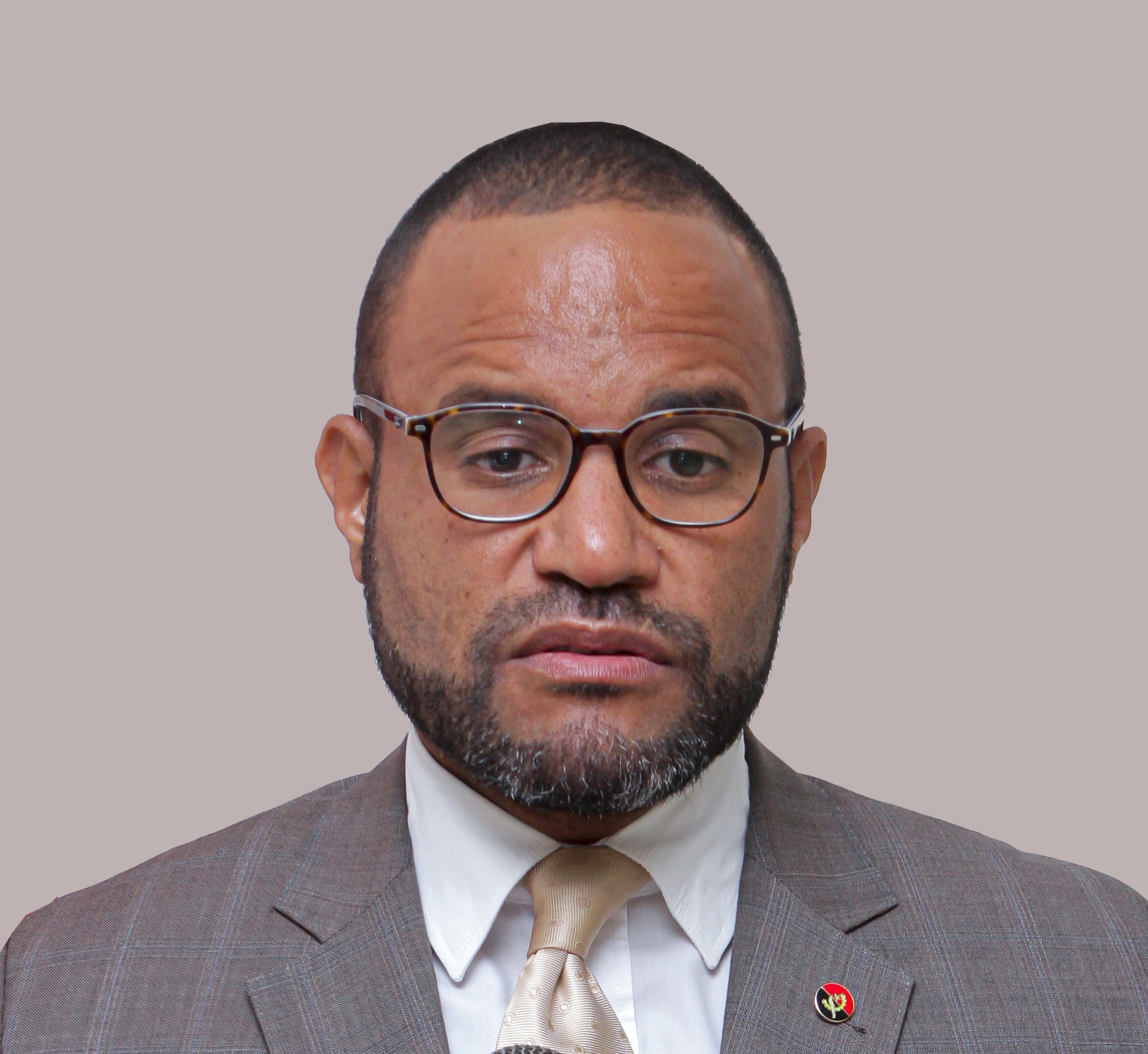

Minister of the Economy and Planning of Angola
- Incumbent
- Assumed office 1 September 2021
- Preceded by: Sérgio de Sousa Mendes dos Santos

Personal details
- Born: Mário Augusto Caetano João de Sousa; 24 November 1978 (age 47) Luanda, Angola
- Party: MPLA
- Education: Charles University; Czech University of Life Sciences Prague
- Occupation: Professor, economist, writer, and politician

Mário Augusto Caetano João de Sousa (born 24 November 1978) is an Angolan professor, economist, writer, and politician. He has been the Minister of the Economy and Planning of the Republic of Angola since 2021.

== Biography ==
Caetano was born in 1978 in the Maianga zone of Luanda. His uncle was militant and pro-independence activist Jacob Caetano. He spent his childhood in the Alvalade neighbourhood, where he went to daycare between 1982 and 1983. He went on to practice ballet at the Escola de Dança Contemporânea de Luanda, from 1984 to 1986, as well as to play basketball with C.D. Primeiro de Agosto from 1994 to 1995.

He went on to attend secondary school in Luanda until 1990, retaking it in the same city between 1993 and 1995.

=== Academic and professional career ===
Caetano moved to Bonn, Germany, where he lived from 1990 to 1992, returning to Angola afterwards. Living in Europe inspired him to move to Prague in 1995, where he graduated from secondary school in 1997. In 1998, he matriculated in licensing courses in pedagogy and physical education, with French language courses at Charles University. He transferred to the Portuguese language courses at the same university, graduating in 2003.

During his time at university in Prague, he began to work part time at a McDonald's, having eventually risen to be the manager. He also lectured part time at the Lycée Josef Skvorecky in Prague. Later on, from 2004 to 2006, he became the commercial and investment manager for AICEP Portugal Global (AICEP), the commercial section of the Portuguese Embassy in Prague.

In 2004, Caetano began a master's program in Portuguese Studies at Charles University. In 2006, he also began a master's program in agrarian economics from the College of Economics and Management at the Czech University of Life Sciences Prague. He continued his studies and, in 2009, graduated with both a master's and doctorate in African Studies from Charles University.

He began his career as an economic in the Czech Republic in 2006, during which time he also became a polyglot, becoming fluent in English, French, Czech, German, Swahili, Spanish, and Italian. He returned to Angola in 2007 to begin lecturing at the Methodist University of Angola and was admitted as an employee at the Ministry of Finance. He was the Chief of Exchange and Cooperation of Angolan Customs from 2008 to 2012.

He became, from 2008 to 2010, part of the Multisectoral Technical Group for the implementation of the Protocol on Commercial Returns from the Southern African Development Community (SADC) and, from 2007 to 2012, the Business Group of Angola for the negotiations of economic partnership agreements with the European Union.

He became the first African person to be accredited by the World Customs Organization as an Advisor of Customs Modernization in 2011. In 2011 as well, he was highlighted in Botswana, where he worked a commercial and customs expert at the Directory of TIFI (Trade, Industry, Finance, and Investment) of the SADC.

=== Political and governmental career in Angola ===
On returning to Angola, Caetano became an activist and member of the provincial Politburo of the MPLA in Luanda.

In 2012, he was transferred to the Study and International Relations Cabinet of the Ministry of Finance, having been, from 2013 to 2015, the Head of the Department of Policies and Macroeconomic Management and, from 2015 to 2016, the Head of the International Relations Department.

Caetano stepped aside from government work from 2016 to 2019 to become the Administrative Assessor of the 25th constituency of World Bank Group, based in Washington, D.C. in the United States. In 2019, however, at the invite of the Angolan government, he returned to Angola to work as the Executive Administrator of the Angola Debt and Stock Exchange (BODIVA) in their finances division.

He assumed, in January 2020, the role of Secretary of State of the Economy. While secretary, he was responsible for overseeing the Programa de Apoio à Produção, Diversificação das Exportações e Substituição das Importações (PRODESI)

On 1 September 2021, Caetano was nominated by president João Lourenço to become the Minister of the Economy and Planning and continued to do so after the 2022 Angolan general election. In 2021, after 5 successive years of GDP decline in Angola, estimates pointed towards positive GDP growth of 0.7%. Caetano, as minister, implemented the Programa de Reconversão da Economia Informal (PREI).

== Awards ==
- 2022 — Special Prize of African Public Service

== Works and public articles ==
- 2005 — Historie angolského zemědělství" (History of Angolan Agriculture), (2005) in Sbornik Prispevku z doktorskeho seminare, vol. 1., Praha: Czech University of Agriculture, Faculty of Economics and Management.
- 2006 — Ekonomie angolského zemědělství" (Economics of Angolan Agriculture), (2006) in M. Caetano Joao, P. Jelinek & A. Knitl (eds.): Lusofonní Afrika 1975–2005 África Lusófona
- 2012 — "Centenário da primeira União Aduaneira do mundo" (Centenary of the first Customs Union in the world), (2010) in Suplemento do Espaço Aduaneiro n. 56, Alfândegas de Angola.
- 2013 — Economia Internacional Volume: 1: Geografia Económica.
- 2018 — Economia Internacional. Volume. 2: Centros, Regiões e Blocos Económicos.
