= Royal Order of Munhumutapa =

The Royal Order of Munhumutapa, named after the Kingdom of Mutapa, is a national order in Zimbabwe. The Order is conferred upon national citizens and foreign former leaders of the Frontline States in recognition of exemplary support of the independence of Zimbabwe and of Southern Africa.

As of August, 2017 the Royal Order of Munhumutapa has been awarded to these 7 individuals. Tanzania is the only country that has had two recipients of the award.

Year	Recipients	Country	Rationale
2005	Julius Nyerere	Tanzania	For his exceptional accomplishments as the luminary and conscience of African nationalism, the fulcrum of liberation efforts in the region.
2005	Sir Seretse Khama	Botswana	For his exceptional commitment to the eradication of colonial domination, unyielding dedication to pan-African ideas, and the pursuit of justice and equality.
2005	Kenneth Kaunda	Zambia	For his exceptional strength of resolve, selfless dedication, revolutionary leadership and outstanding contribution to the long and arduous struggle for equality, justice and self-determination.
2005	Samora Machel	Mozambique	For his exceptional revolutionary courage, unyielding determination, selfless dedication, inspirational leadership and outstanding contribution to the liberation struggle.
2005	Agostinho Neto	Angola	For his exceptional commitment, dedication, inspirational leadership and outstanding contribution to the liberation struggle.
2014	Hashim Mbita	Tanzania	For the important role he played in regional liberation as well integration during his 20-year tenure as the Executive Secretary of the Liberation Committee of the Organisation of African Unity (OAU) – precursor to the African Union (AU).
2017	Fr. Paschal Slevin OFM	(Republic of Ireland) Ireland	For having supported the cause of the liberation struggle in Zimbabwe while a missionary priest at Mount St Mary’s Mission in Hwedza. He helped ZANLA militants to cross into Zambia, including future ZDF Commander General Constantino Chiwenga and Air Force of Zimbabwe Air Marshal Perence Shiri. He was deported back to the Republic of Ireland by the Rhodesian government in 1977. After independence, he returned and continued to work tirelessly for the development of Zimbabwe.
