= Michelle Marinova =

Snooker player

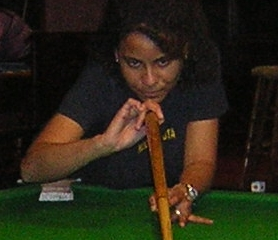
Marinova playing snooker in 2007

Mihaela Radkova Marinova, better known as Michelle Marinova, is a business administrator and former snooker player of Bulgarian and Angolan nationality. She was a snooker player on the circuits from 2002 to 2008, then later competed in 2013. She reached the quarter-finals of the World Women's Snooker Championship in 2005 and the final of the 2008 World Ladies Snooker Championship plate tournament. She was the top Bulgarian women's snooker player at the time.

== Early life ==
Michelle was born on the 26 February 1974 in Sofia, Bulgaria. Her mother was a Bulgarian woman named Radka Marinova. Her father was the Angolan President Agostinho Neto. She grew up in Bulgaria during the communist era. She attended Dudley Beauty College after leaving school. After quitting snooker, Michelle founded social media and forum site Pawer and created a community for dog-lovers. She has a keen interest in photography.

== Snooker career ==
After turning professional in 2002, Michelle first entered the 2003 World Women's Snooker Championship but withdrew before playing her first match. In 2004 she was eliminated in Group B of the Connie Gough National, finishing third behind Lynette Horsburgh, then ranked number 1 in the world, and Caroline Walch, before losing to Marianne Williams in the plate tournament.

In the 2005 World Women's World Championship, she finished second in Group D and qualified for the quarter-finals ahead of veteran Jenny Poulter, before losing to eventual champion Reanne Evans 5–0, her best run in a main tournament event.

After a mini-break from the game, she returned for the 2008 World Ladies Snooker Championship, finishing fourth in Group D and thus being eliminated from the main tournament. In the plate tournament, she defeated Gaye Jones 2–1, Eva Palmius 2-0 and Pam Wood 2–0 to reach the final. In the final she lost to Malgorzata Sikorska in a deciding frame 1–2.

After leaving the tour, Michelle would play once more in 2013 at the Connie Gough Memorial, losing in her first match 3–1 to Martina Lumsden, then in the plate tournament losing to Poulter 2–0.
