= Mausoleum of António Agostinho Neto =

Monument for Angola's first president

- Memorial António Agostinho Neto
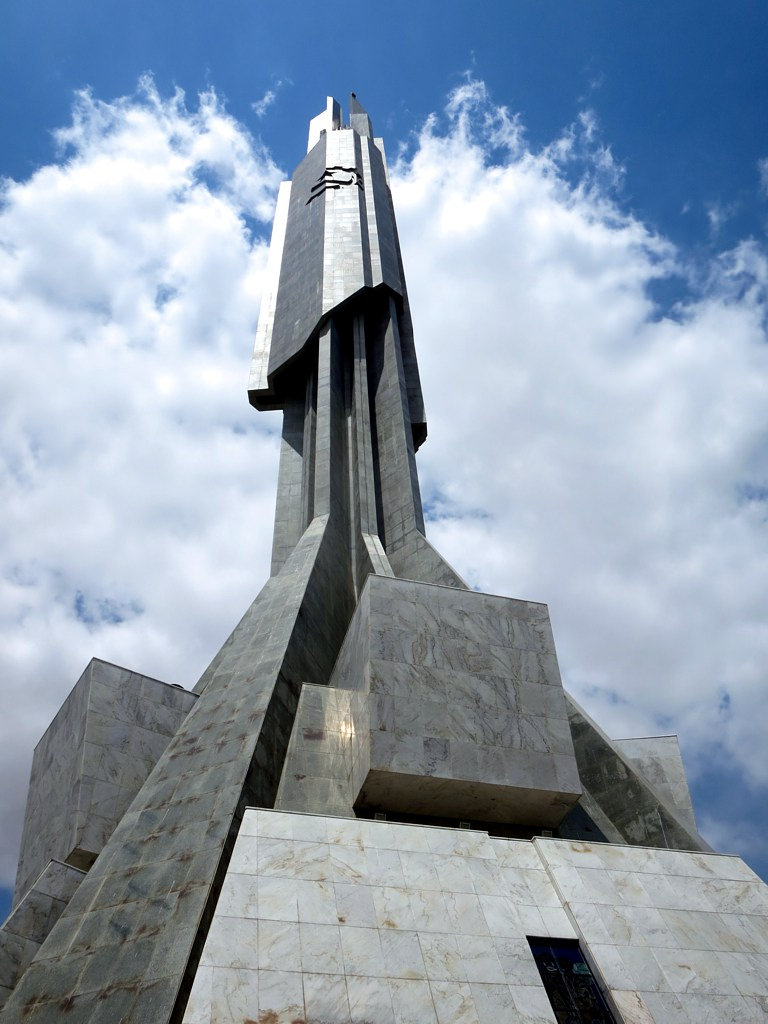
- Mausoleum of António Agostinho Neto in Luanda
- Interactive map of Mausoleum of António Agostinho Neto
- Location: Luanda, Angola
- Coordinates: 8°49′25″S 13°13′08″E
- Material: concrete
- Height: 120m
- Beginning date: September 17, 1982
- Inauguration date: September 17, 2012
- Dedicated to: Dr. Antonio Agostinho Neto

The Mausoleum of António Agostinho Neto (Memorial António Agostinho Neto), known by the acronym MAAN, is a monument in Luanda, Angola, dedicated to and housing the remains of Agostinho Neto, first president of the Republic of Angola. It is one of the tallest and most visible landmarks in the Angolan capital.

== Overview ==
The 18-hectare memorial campus is located on the Praia do Bispo in Luanda, Angola. Its primary feature is a 120-meter tall concrete spire built in a brutalist constructivist style and nicknamed "Foguetão", meaning "Space Rocket". Foguetão was designed as a reference to Neto's poem A Caminho das Estrelas (Pathway to the Stars). The machete-cogwheel-and-star emblem of the Flag of Angola features prominently on its side.

The pyramid at the base of the spire contains the sarcophagus and last remains of Neto, embalmed by the same organization responsible for the embalming of Vladimir Lenin. It also houses the last remains of his successor, José Eduardo dos Santos, as of 2022.

The main entrance features a gallery of bronze artworks and commemorative plaques including twelve sculptures in neo-socialist realist style, forty-eight plates featuring eulogies and quotations from speeches, and an engraving of Neto's signature flanked by Neto's poems Pathway to the Stars and Farewell at the Moment of Parting.

MAAN also features a museum, exhibition gallery, library, video library, and documentation center, all of which are available to visitors. In 2020, during the COVID-19 pandemic, MAAN put its art collection available for view online.

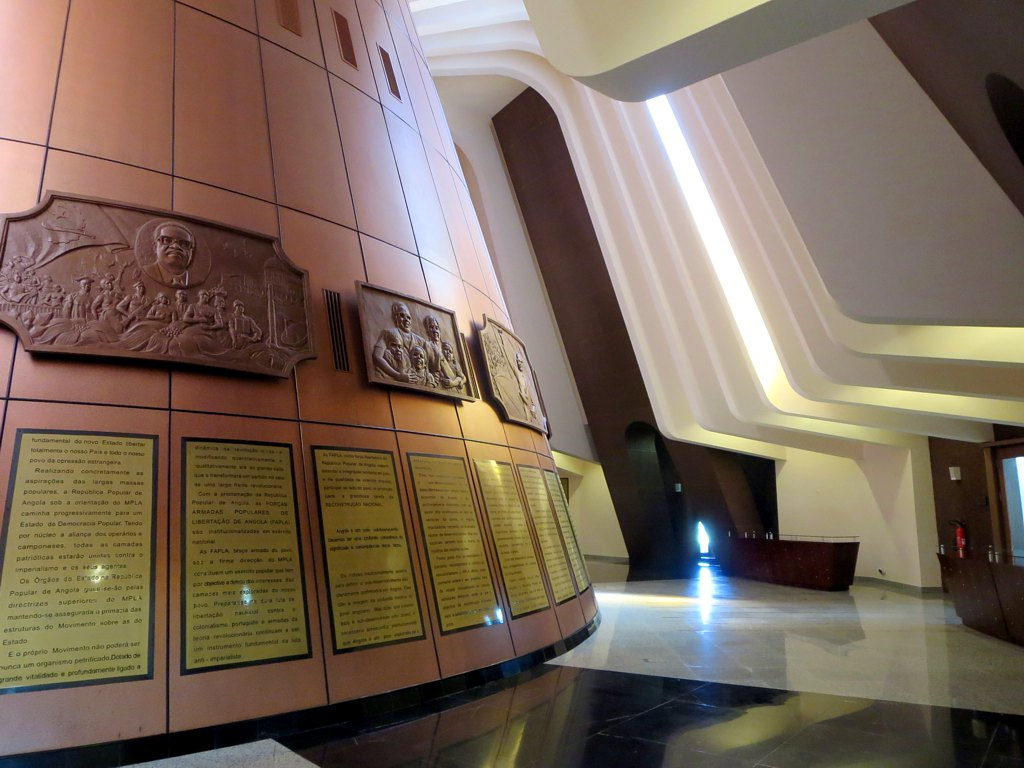
Interior of MAAN showing bronze plaques at sculptures

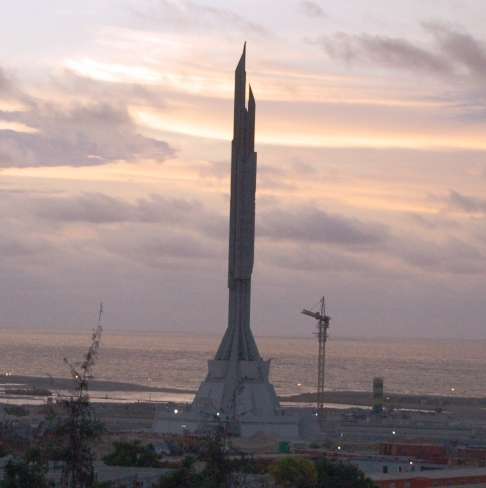
MAAN under construction in 2008

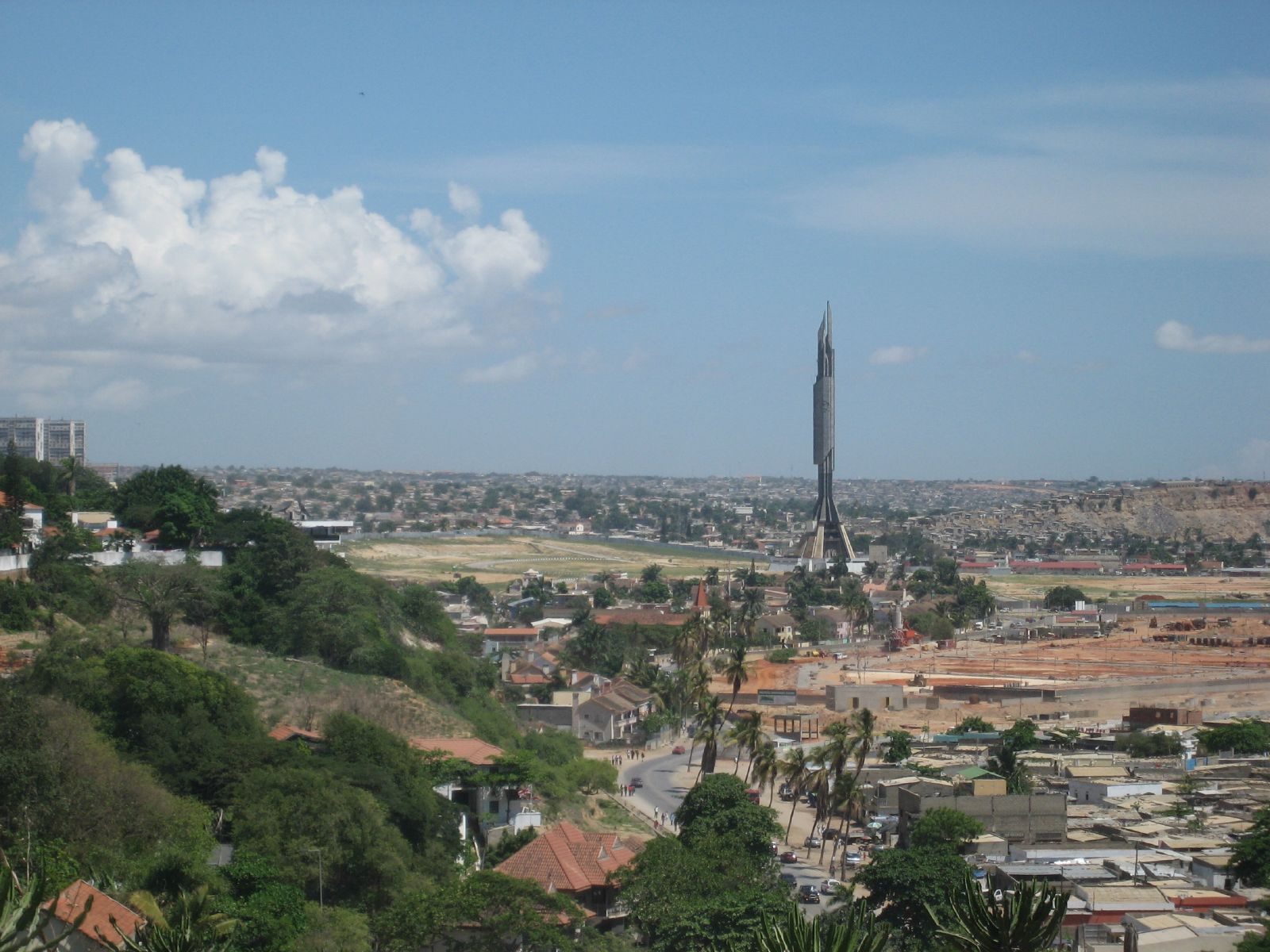
MAAN standing tall over Luanda

== History ==
After Neto died of pancreatic cancer in September 1979 in Moscow, Soviet Union, the government of his successor, José Eduardo dos Santos, commissioned the USSR to construct an enormous mausoleum for him. In 1980, designers from the Soviet Union began working on the design. The first stones of the memorial were laid on September 17, 1982, which would have been Neto's 60th birthday. Work on the MAAN project was suspended in the late 1980s due to multiple economic and political factors including worsening conditions around the Angolan Civil War and the dissolution of the Soviet Union.

In 1998, the Angolan government began working towards restarting construction, with the intent to make the mausoleum into a cultural center with assistance from Brazilian architecture office Willer and Associates. Work resumed in 2005 after the project obtained the necessary funds, and the memorial was completed in January 2011. Dos Santos inaugurated the memorial the following year on September 17, 2012, the 90th anniversary of Neto's birth.

The MAAN project cost approximately US$40 million and was funded by Angola's MPLA in partnership with the government of North Korea. MAAN is one of two Angolan monuments built by North Korea-based Mansudae Overseas Projects, the other being the Peace Monument in Luena.

Upon its completion, MAAN was the tallest structure in Luanda until construction of the 145 meter tall IMOB Business Tower in 2018.

MAAN was the site of both the inauguration of President João Lourenço on September 26, 2017 and the wake of former president Dos Santos in 2022.
