= Ludy Kissassunda =

Angolan politician (1932–2021)

Gen. Ludy Kissassunda

Governor of Zaire Province
- In office 1995–2004
- Preceded by: Zeferino Estêvão Juliana
- Succeeded by: Pedro Sebastião

Governor of Malanje Province
- In office 1980–1986
- Preceded by: Domingos Afonso Neto
- Succeeded by: Lt. Col. João Ernesto dos Santos Liberdade

Personal details
- Born: João Rodrigues Lopes; 27 September 1932 N'zeto, Portuguese Angola (now Angola)
- Died: 6 January 2021 (aged 88) Setúbal, Portugal
- Party: MPLA

General João Rodrigues Lopes, known by his nom de guerre Ludy Kissassunda (27 September 1932 – 6 January 2021) was an Angolan general and politician. Born in 1932 in N'zeto, Zaire Province, he held important ranks during the Angolan War of Independence and the Angolan Civil War, holding a particularly important role with the reorganization of troops of, as well as the overall logistics of, the People's Liberation Army of Angola, which would later become the People's Armed Forces of Liberation of Angola (FAPLA).

During his political career, he was a member of the Politburo of the Central Committee of the People's Movement for the Liberation of Angola (MPLA), being one of Agostinho Neto's closest associates. He was the founder and director of the Department of Information and Security of Angola (DISA), the MPLA's (and later Angola's) intelligence agency, from 1975 to 1979. He was also the governor of Malanje Province from 1980 to 1986, and of Zaire Province from 1995 to 2004.

Kissassunda died on 6 January 2021 in Setúbal, Portugal. He was buried at Alto das Cruzes cemetery in Luanda.
