= Directorate of Information and Security of Angola =

- Direcção de Informação e Segurança de Angola
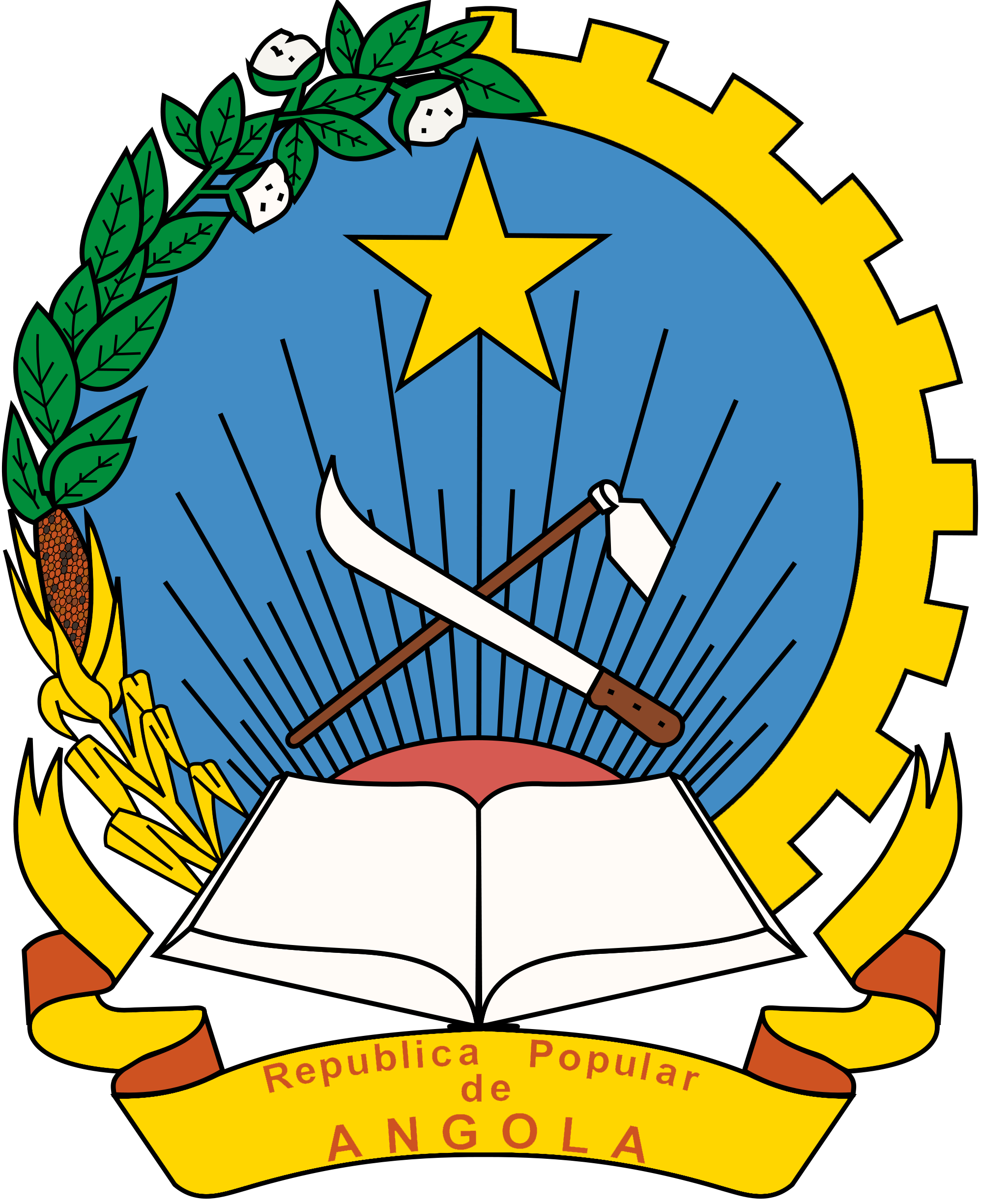

Agency overview
- Formed: 1975
- Dissolved: 1979
- Headquarters: Luanda, People's Republic of Angola

The Directorate of Information and Security of Angola was the secret police of the communist People's Republic of Angola from 1975 until its absorption by the Interior Ministry in 1979.

DISA had the authority to detain and interrogate those suspected of actions against the MPLA for indefinite periods of time and its operations were quite notorious in the early stages of the Angolan Civil War, though it was somewhat disorganized. This lack of organization was one of the primary factors for the organization's dissolution in 1979.
