= Fractionism =

Political movement

Fractionism (Angolan Portuguese: fraccionismo), also called Nito's Group or Nitism (Angolan Portuguese: nitismo), and self-called MPLA Action Committee — FAPLA-People Unit, was an Angolan political movement with an orthodox communist nature, led by Nito Alves, former leader of the People's Movement for the Liberation of Angola (MPLA).

Fractionism was a movement of dissent from the MPLA, organized after Angola's independence, in opposition to President Agostinho Neto. He launched an attempted coup d'état in Luanda on May 27, 1977. The movement failed due to poor planning of the actions to take power, the lack of a clear objective in front of the popular masses and the military support to the State apparatus provided by the troops of the Cuban Armed Forces, who had been carrying out Operation Carlota in Angolan territory since 1975.

Despite the failure of the Factionist movement, the attempted coup d'état of May 27, 1977 promoted profound structural changes in the MPLA party and the Angolan State, such as the official adoption, by both, of the Marxist-Leninist ideology until 1990.

== Description ==
Fractionism culminated in the attempted coup d'etat on 27 May 1977 against Agostinho Neto, led by a leading figure of the MPLA (Movimento Popular de Libertação de Angola), Nito Alves, who was in power since the country's independence. The movement had the support of the Communist Organization of Angola but was suppressed with the help of Cuban military. An estimated 18,000 followers (or alleged followers) of Nito Alves were killed in the aftermath of the attempted coup, over a period that lasted up to two years.

== Background ==
Nito Alves fought alongside MPLA since 1961. In 1974, during the Carnation Revolution in Portugal, he was the leader of the military in the MPLA, in the region of Dembos, to the northeast of Luanda.

During the Provisional government, he became the leader of MPLA's supporters in the musseques of Luanda, where he organised committees named "Poder Popular" (Popular Power), fighting during the Civil War in Luanda against the National Liberation Front of Angola.

Angola would obtain its independence one year and a few months later. At that point, according to the fraccionists, there was already a distortion of the ideals many supported had fought for. There was a wedge at the core of the movement between the "moderados" (moderates), committed to a steady and careful growth and the return of Agostinho Neto and Lopo do Nascimento, and a radical faction, led by Nito Alves, which objected to the predominance of mestizos and whites in the government.

According to the radicals, "the whites and those of mixed blood performed a disproportionate role in the government of a predominantly black country". However, at that time, there were already some black people in power, more so because president Agostinho Neto insisted in establishing a multiracial government in Angola. Some of those government members saw the opportunity of obtaining a larger share of power, explicitly launching an appeal for race to the people, as Nito Alves did when claiming, in a rally in Luanda's periphery, that "Angola would only be truly independent when whites, mestizos and blacks swept the streets together".

Nito Alves was considered by some as second in power to Agostinho Neto. He had been nominated Minister of the Interior when MPLA formed the first government of Angola. However, Nito Alves' dissatisfaction with Agostinho Neto's alleged orientation toward the intellectual urban mestizos, such as Lúcio Lara, influential historian and the party's chief ideologist, Paulo Jorge, and the Minister of Defence, "Iko" Carreira, constituted a division in the government.

This division became more evident during the Central Committee's 3rd plenary meeting on 23 to 29 October 1976, when Nito Alves and José Van-Dúnen were suspended for accusations of fractionism, after having played a crucial role in creating a 2nd MPLA.

As a result of their suspension, Nito Alves and José Van-Dúnen proposed the creation of a committee of inquiry to find out whether there truly was fractionism at the core of the party. The committee was led by José Eduardo dos Santos, who dragged out the inquiries, as well as the reports about fractionism, causing the division to spread in MPLA.

It was because of this committee of inquiry that José Eduardo dos Santos himself, and the then prime-minister Lopo do Nascimento, were later on accused of being fractionists. However, José Eduardo dos Santos was cleared of charges by the provincial commissioner of Lubango, Belamino Van-Dúnem.

José Van-Dúnem's wife, Sita Valles, who had connections to the Communist Party of the Soviet Union obtained through the Komsomol, was also expelled from the MPLA, accused of being a spy for the KGB.

The realisation of a Grand Assembly of supporters on 21 May 1977, in Luanda, was the breaking point, with the official announcement of Nito Alves and José Van-Dúnem's expulsion.

== Bibliography ==
- Agostinho Neto, O que é o fraccionismo, Luanda: Departamento de Orientação Revolucionária (MPLA), Colecção Resistência, 1977
- David Birmingham, The Twenty Seventh of May: An Historical Note on the Abortive Coup Attempt in Angola, African Affairs, 77/3, pp. 37–56
- Dalila Cabrita Mateus & Álvaro Mateus, Purga em Angola, Lisboa: Edições Asa, 2007, ISBN 978-972-41-5372-8
- Américo Cardoso Botelho, Holocausto em Angola, Lisboa: Editora Vega, 2007, ISBN 978-972-699-877-8
- Miguel Francisco, Nuvem Negra, o drama do 27 de Maio de 1977, Lisboa: Clássica Editora, 2007
- Felícia Cabrita, Massacres em África, Lisboa: A Esfera dos Livros, 2008 ISBN 978-989-626-089-7
