= People's Republic of Angola =

Self-declared socialist state (1975–1992)

People's Republic of Angola República Popular de Angola (Portuguese)
- 1975–1992
- Flag Coat of arms
- Anthem: Angola Avante ("Onwards Angola")
- Capital: Luanda
- Common languages: Portuguese
- Religion: State atheism
- Government: Unitary communist state
- President
  - 1975–1979: Agostinho Neto
  - 1979–1992: José Eduardo dos Santos
- Prime Minister
  - 1975–1978: Lopo do Nascimento
  - 1991–1992: Fernando José de França Dias Van-Dúnem
- Historical era: Cold War
  - Independence from Portugal: 11 November 1975
  - Abolition of Marxist government: 25 August 1992
- Currency: Kwanza
- Calling code: 244
- ISO 3166 code: AO
Preceded by	Succeeded by
Overseas Province of Angola; Republic of Cabinda	Republic of Angola

The People's Republic of Angola (Portuguese: República Popular de Angola) was declared on 11 November 1975 by leaders of the Popular Movement for the Liberation of Angola (MPLA), at the time a Marxist–Leninist organisation, as a communist state. (Note: Angola was first declared a national democratic state on 11 November 1975 and later a people's democratic state on 12 October 1977) The Angolan War of Independence from Portugal which had begun 14 years prior in 1961 ended with the Alvor Agreement, which granted independence to Angola under a transitional government that initially included groups such as the FNLA and UNITA along with the MPLA.

Disagreements between these factions resulted in civil war, which escalated following the MPLA's unilateral declaration of a people's republic in November; it competed with the rival Democratic People's Republic of Angola (UNITA), backed by South Africa and the United States, and received aid from Cuba and the Soviet Union, to which it was aligned to in the Cold War until its dissolution in 1991. The landmark Tripartite Accord of 1988 led to the withdrawal of South African and Cuban forces from Angola, and following the Bicesse Accords Angola transitioned into a multiparty democracy that was finalised with the adoption of a new constitution in 1992 while civil war between UNITA and MPLA forces continued until 2002.

== History ==
=== War of Independence, 1961–1975 ===
In 1961, the People's Movement for the Liberation of Angola (MPLA) and National Liberation Front of Angola (FNLA), based in neighbouring countries, launched a guerrilla campaign against Portuguese rule in Angola, in what was called the Overseas Province of Angola. In 1966, the National Union for the Total Independence of Angola (UNITA) joined the struggle for independence against Portugal. The MPLA was Marxist-Leninist and backed by both Cuba and the Soviet Union. UNITA was primarily backed by China. The war lasted until the overthrow of Portugal's Estado Novo regime in 1974 through the Carnation Revolution. On 15 January 1975 the different parties signed the Alvor Accords. The agreement promised Angolan independence and elections for the National Assembly of Angola in October 1975. The agreement also called for the integration of the Angolan parties into a new unified Angolan military.

=== Civil War, 1975–1991 ===
During the independence war, the three pro-independent groups sometimes fought each other, in addition to the Portuguese. Following the Alvor Accords, the relationship between these groups deteriorated further. In July 1975, the MPLA violently forced the FNLA out of Luanda, while UNITA voluntarily withdrew to its stronghold in the south. By August, the MPLA had conquered 11 of the 15 provincial capitals, including the capital city Luanda, and also the oil rich Cabinda, which was claimed by the separatist Front for the Liberation of the Enclave of Cabinda (FLEC). On October 23, South Africa launched Operation Savannah, with 2,000 soldiers crossing from Namibia in support of both the FNLA and UNITA. They quickly captured five provincial capitals from the MPLA. Zaire also intervened from the north against the MPLA in support of the FNLA. At the start of November, Cuba sent 4,000 soldiers in support of the MPLA as part of Operation Carlota.

On 11 November 1975, Agostinho Neto, the leader of the MPLA, declared Angola's independence as the People's Republic of Angola a one-party Marxist-Leninist state. In response, UNITA declared Angolan independence as the Social Democratic Republic of Angola in Huambo, while the FNLA declared the Democratic Republic of Angola based in Ambriz. FLEC declared the independence of the Republic of Cabinda. The FNLA and UNITA forged an alliance on 23 November 1975, proclaiming their own coalition government, the Democratic People's Republic of Angola, based in Huambo with FLNA's Holden Roberto and UNITA's Jonas Savimbi as co-presidents.

The Cuban intervention, which would eventually number 18,000, was key in securing the MPLA's positions and repelling the advances of FNLA and UNITA. South Africa began withdrawing its troops in January 1976. The MPLA, with Cuban help, consolidated power over the whole country capturing all of Angola's provincial capitals, including Huambo on 8 February. Without South African support, UNITA was weakened and withdrew into the bush to fight a guerrilla war where they continued to be supplied by South Africa and the United States.

Factionalism within the MPLA became a major challenge to Neto's power by late 1975. Interior minister Nito Alves, and Chief of Staff José Jacinto Van-Dúnem, began planning a coup d'état against Neto, allegedly with Soviet backing. Alves and Van-Dunem planned to arrest Neto on 21 May 1977 before a meeting of the MPLA's Central Committee but this was cancelled after the location of the meeting was changed. The Central Committee accused Alves of factionalism and voted to dismiss Alves and Van-Dunem. In support of Alves, the FAPLA 8th Brigade freed more than 150 supporters of Nito Alves, called Nitistas, from São Paulo prison on 27 May. The Nitistas then took control of the palace and the radio station in Luanda, announcing their coup. Cuban forces loyal to Neto retook the palace, radio station and the barracks of the 8th Brigade. The MPLA government arrested tens of thousands of suspected Nitistas from May to November, including Van-Dunem who was executed. Thousands of Nitistas were executed by Cuban and MPLA troops in the purge.

During the civil war, South Africa would launch large-scale operations in Angola to attack SWAPO guerrillas who were fighting for Namibian independence from South Africa. They would also launch operations in support of UNITA guerrillas while Cuban forces remained in Angola in support of government military operations. In January 1984, an agreement was negotiated. South Africa obtained from Angola a promise to withdraw its support for the SWAPO in exchange for the evacuation of all South African troops from Angola, however South Africa continued to launch raids into Angola.

In 1988, the Battle of Cuito Cuanavale, where the MPLA and Cuba battled UNITA and South Africa to a stalemate, led to the Tripartite Accord, which secured Namibia's independence and the withdrawal of Cuban and South African forces from Angola.

In tandem with the fall of the Soviet Union, in 1991 the MPLA and UNITA signed the peace agreement known as the Bicesse Accords, which allowed for multiparty elections in Angola. In 1992, the People's Republic of Angola was constitutionally succeeded by the Republic of Angola and elections were scheduled.

Angola held the first round of its 1992 presidential election on 29–30 September. Dos Santos officially received 49.57% of the vote and Savimbi won 40.6%. A second round of voting was required since no candidate had received more than 50%. UNITA and the other opposition parties, as well as some election observers, said the election hadn't been fair. On 31 October, government troops in Luanda attacked UNITA supporters, including UNITA Vice President Jeremias Chitunda, who was killed. Thousands of UNITA and FNLA voters were massacred across the country by the MPLA in what is known as the Halloween Massacre. The civil war resumed and only ended after Savimbi was killed in 2002. The war had killed 800,000 people and displaced 4 million.

=== Economy ===
Following Angola's war of independence, the nation was plunged into a profound economic crisis and suffered extensive destruction of its infrastructure.The conflict against Portugal devastated the land, crippling agriculture. The mass exodus of Portuguese settlers resulted in a significant brain drain, particularly of skilled technicians in industry, hindering its development. Furthermore, the institution of the new Marxist-Leninist government led many companies to flee Angola.

The MPLA's main objective was to rebuild the country's economy. Mass campaigns to socialize the means of production would begin, leading to nationalizations in industry and collectivizations in agriculture. In the early years of the People's Republic of Angola, the economy would be heavily dependent on aid from the Eastern Bloc and the Soviet Union, which would be so extensive as to be indispensable.

The Angolan government managed its oil windfall effectively. The trade balance remained profitable and external debt was kept within reasonable limits. In 1985, debt service amounted to $324 million, or about 15% of exports.

The oil industry was the backbone of Angolan industry and a major contributor to the country's GDP, and it experienced significant growth under the MPLA. When the Portuguese fled, most small manufacturing businesses were left without their administrative workforce, managers, and even owners; by 1976, only 284 of 692 manufacturing companies were operating under their former management. In response to the decline of the manufacturing sector, in March 1976 the MPLA government enacted the State Intervention Act and nationalized all the abandoned businesses.

=== Education ===
A major effort was made in the field of adult education and literacy, particularly in urban centers. In 1986, the number of primary school students exceeded one and a half million, and nearly half a million adults learned to read and write. The language of instruction remained mainly Portuguese, but experiments were tried to introduce the study of local African languages from the first years of schooling. Relations between the churches and the ruling party remained relatively calm.

== See also ==
- African socialism
