= Alto das Cruzes cemetery =

Cemetery in Luanda, Angola

Coordinates: 8°48′44″S 13°14′44″E

- Cemitério do Alto das Cruzes

Details
- Location: Miramar, Luanda, Angola
- Country: Angola
- Type: Public cemetery

Alto das Cruzes cemetery (Portuguese: Cemitério do Alto das Cruzes) is a cemetery in Miramar, Luanda, Angola. It is one of the most prominent cemeteries of the city, where many of the illustrious Angolan personalities are buried. In 1996 the cemetery was photographed extensively by the Escola Profissional da Lousã.
