= Lúcio Lara =

Angolan politician

Lúcio Rodrigo Leite Barreto de Lara

Acting President of Angola
- In office 11 September 1979 – 20 September 1979
- Preceded by: Agostinho Neto
- Succeeded by: José Eduardo dos Santos

Personal details
- Born: 9 April 1929 Caála, Portuguese Angola
- Died: 27 February 2016 (aged 86) Luanda, Angola
- Spouse: Ruth Manuela Pflüger Rosemberg Lara
- Occupation: Politician
- Known for: Founding member of MPLA; Anti-colonial ideologist Theorist of Marxism

Lúcio Rodrigo Leite Barreto de Lara (9 April 1929 – 27 February 2016), also known by the pseudonym Tchiweka, was an Angolan revolutionary, physicist-mathematician, politician, anti-colonial ideologist and one of the founding members (and president) of the Popular Movement for the Liberation of Angola (MPLA). He served as General Secretary of the MPLA during the Angolan War of Independence and Angolan Civil War. Lara, a founding member of the MPLA, led the first MPLA members into Luanda on 8 November 1974. He swore in Agostinho Neto as the first president of the country.

He was acting president of Angola for ten days, from 10 September 1979 to 20 September 1979, briefly leading the country between the death of Agostinho Neto and the inauguration of José Eduardo dos Santos. He was a member of the Angolan parliament from independence until 2003.

He was the main ideologist and thinker of Angola's self-determination, as well as an important theorist of Marxism, being one of the biggest names in the country in the 20th century.

== Early life and education ==
Lúcio Lara was born in the city of Caála, in the province of Huambo, on 9 April 1929. His father was a merchant, and his mother was a princess of the Bailundo kingdom.

Between 1949 and 1952, he studied for a degree in mathematics at the University of Lisbon. During this period, he became a resident of the House of Students of the Empire, a student body that served as a center for anti-colonial discussions in Lisbon, Portugal. It was in this discussion center that he became friends with António Agostinho Neto (future president of Angola). The two would be responsible for the formation of the ideological nucleus of the Popular Movement for the Liberation of Angola (MPLA). After graduating in mathematics, he began working as a teacher in Lisbon.

He entered the University of Coimbra in 1954 to study for a degree in physical chemistry, abandoning his studies in 1958 without completing them.

While participating in political party activities in Lisbon, he met Ruth Pflüger, a young Lisbon-born Portuguese Jew of German ancestry whom he married in 1955.

== Political career ==
He founded, together with several anti-colonial students and workers, the Clube Marítimo Africano in Lisbon, a recreational and sports entity that also served as a center for debates about colonialism. The Clube was important to circumvent Portugal's intelligence and information services and prevent the interception of correspondence.

In 1955, he joined the Angolan Communist Party (PCA), while taking part in the activities of the Portuguese Communist Party (PCP). In 1957, he joined the MPLA (founded the previous year), becoming its main ideologue, being even attributed to him the elaboration of the Marxist ideology of the party, which would become the dominant current.

His political activities lead him to be pursued by the PIDE (political police of Portugal). He is forced to flee Lisbon with his wife Ruth in March 1959 to West Germany and then to East Germany. In the same year, he fled again to Italy, when he discovered that there were Portuguese agents infiltrated in East Germany to assassinate him. In Italy, the philosopher Frantz Fanon found shelter for the couple in Tunisia and later in Morocco. In Rabat, Morocco, it signs an agreement with the African Party for the Independence of Guinea and Cape Verde (PAIGC) to establish the MPLA's first international office in Conakry, Guinea. He stayed for a period in Guinea working as a professor of chemistry.

He was elected at the first conference of the MPLA party, in December 1962, as secretary of the organization and cadres and as a member of the central committee of the MPLA. In 1963, with its expulsion from Democratic Republic of Congo/Zaire, and its flight across the river to Congo-Brazzaville, the MPLA fell into a state of total disarray and might have ceased to exist had Lara's brilliant organizational skills and cunning political decisions not saved it.

After being elected as secretary general of the party, he moved permanently with his family to Brazzaville (in 1964), considered the pro-tempore seat of the MPLA during the period of Angola's war of independence. In this city, he worked as a teacher of mathematics and chemistry in the party's schools and organizes the MPLA's department of education and culture, responsible for preparing teachers and maintaining a vast library.

On 8 November 1974 Lara was appointed head of the MPLA's diplomatic delegation for the first official visit to Luanda. His arrival was greeted by an ecstatic crowd of supporters, who broke through the containment barriers and invaded the runway at Luanda Airport when the delegation plane landed. Lara's delegation served to prepare the visit of Agostinho Neto to Luanda, the first visit of the party chief after the Carnation Revolution. Neto landed in the capital on 4 February 1975, being received by an even larger number of supporters.

On the date of Angola's independence, Lara was elected president of the Constituent Assembly. He enacted the Constitution of Angola on 10 November 1975. In addition, he conducted Angola's first formal presidential election (indirect), won by Agostinho Neto. On the same date, Neto was sworn in by Lara as the first President of Angola. Lara remained president of parliament until 1977.

In the purge of Fractionism between June 1977 and mid-1979, ordered by Agostinho Neto, "an undisclosed number of people, sometimes estimated to be in the tens of thousands, were executed". Though the work of arresting, jailing, torturing and killing dissidents, real or imagined, was ordered by Neto, and carried out by lower-level cadres, it is generally accepted that the operation was directed by Lara, Minister of Defence Iko Carreira, Head of DISA Ludy Kissassunda and Kissassunda's Deputy Henrique de Carvalho Santos (Onambwe).

On 10 December 1977, despite the tragic results of the purge, Lara was re-elected to the central committee of the MPLA, which made him the second most important member of the political bureau (after only Neto) and vice-president of the party, being responsible for the organization and the ideological sector.

== Angola's presidency and end of political career ==
On the date of Agostinho Neto's death, Lara was the highest member of the political bureau and vice-president of the MPLA. With this, he assumed, on an interim basis, the functions of president of the party, and, by extension, president of the People's Republic of Angola. He urgently convened the 2nd MPLA Congress on 11 September 1979, working hard for the election of José Eduardo dos Santos, which occurred on September 20 of that same year. He rejected all proposals made to him to effectively take over the leadership of the country.

In 1980 he was re-elected member of the MPLA's central committee, political bureau and secretary of organization. In addition, he was elected chairman of the intergovernmental council of the Pan-African News Agency (PanaPress), a position he held for 5 years. In the same year, he was elected deputy representing the province of Moxico. While in this term, he was responsible for the special parliamentary commission for coffee production and the permanent parliamentary health commission.

In 1985, Angolan President José Eduardo dos Santos removes him from the MPLA's political bureau, remaining only on the party's central committee, in what is called an Edwardian internal political purge against adversaries. In March 1986, he assumed the functions of 1st secretary of the National Assembly, which he remained until 1992.

At the same time, in the 1980s and 1990s, the United States Central Intelligence Agency (CIA) had him as the main target to be neutralized and overthrown in the party's internal destabilization campaign.

He decided to leave public life for health reasons in November 2003, when he resigned from the legislative mandate he had held since 1975. The Angolan Ministry of Defense retired him as an army general in 2004, but he refused to use the rank because he did not consider himself a military professional.

== Retirement and death ==
After leaving a political career, Lara dedicated himself to organizing his historical and documental collection about the independence process and the formation of Angola, creating the Tchiweka Documentation Association (ATD). In 1996 he released the memoir "For a broad movement…", with a preface by his wife Ruth.

He died in the Angolan capital on 27 February 2016, aged 86.

== Personal life ==
His only wife was the German-Angolan teacher Ruth Manuela Pflüger Rosemberg Lara, with whom he had three children: Paulo, Wanda and Bruno. Ruth died of natural causes in 2000. With Ruth, in the 1960s, she adopted a Brazzaville-Congolese child Jean-Michel Mabeko Tali.
