= Agostinho Neto =

President of Angola from 1975 to 1979

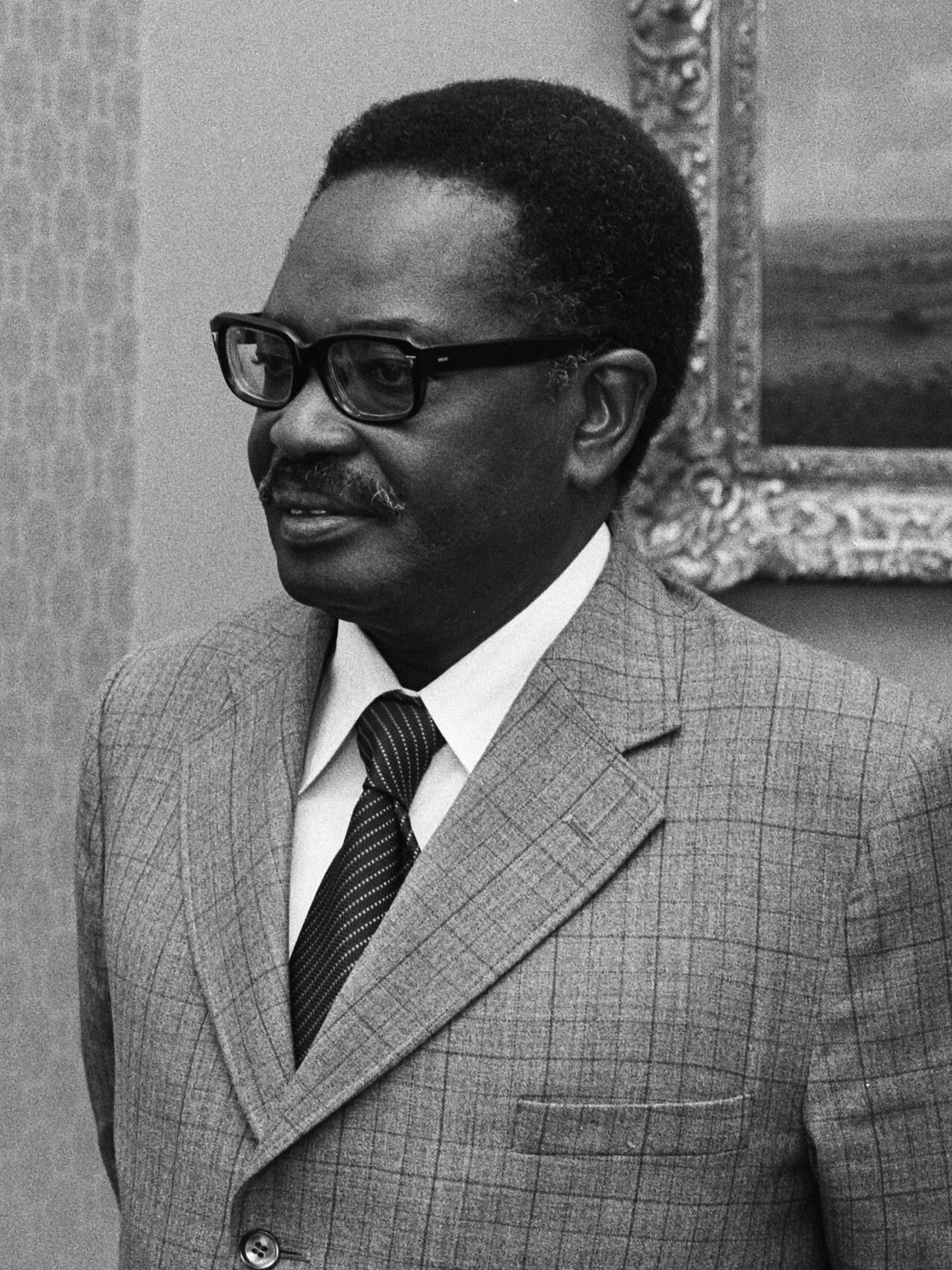
- Neto in 1975

1st President of Angola
- In office 11 November 1975 – 10 September 1979
- Prime Minister: Lopo do Nascimento
- Preceded by: Office established
- Succeeded by: José Eduardo dos Santos

President of the People's Movement for the Liberation of Angola
- In office 10 December 1956 – 10 September 1979
- Preceded by: Ilídio Machado
- Succeeded by: José Eduardo dos Santos

Personal details
- Born: António Agostinho Neto; 17 September 1922 Caxicane, Portuguese Angola
- Died: 10 September 1979 (aged 56) Moscow, Soviet Union
- Cause of death: Pancreatic cancer
- Party: MPLA
- Spouse: Maria Eugénia Neto (m. 1957)
- Relations: António Alberto Neto (nephew); Ruth Neto (sister); Deolinda Rodrigues (cousin); Roberto Francisco de Almeida (cousin)
- Children: 4, including Michelle Marinova
- Education: University of Lisbon

Military service
- Allegiance: People's Republic of Angola
- Years of service: 1961–1979
- Battles/wars: Angolan War of Independence; Angolan Civil War

António Agostinho Neto Kilamba (17 September 1922 – 10 September 1979) was an Angolan communist revolutionary, politician and poet. He served as the first president of Angola from 1975 to 1979, after leading the Popular Movement for the Liberation of Angola (MPLA) during the war for independence. He led the MPLA during the beginning of the Angolan Civil War, which began in 1975 and lasted until 2002. An author of several books, he is considered Angola's preeminent poet. His birthday is celebrated as National Heroes' Day, a public holiday in Angola.

== Early life and education ==
Neto was born at Caxicane, in Ícolo e Bengo, a province of Portuguese Angola, on 17 September 1922, to parents who were both school teachers and Methodists. His father was also a Methodist pastor. Neto attended high school in Luanda, Angola's capital.

After secondary school, Neto worked in the colonial health services, before going on to university. The younger Neto left Angola for Portugal, and studied medicine at University of Coimbra and University of Lisbon.

As a college student, Neto combined his academic life with covert revolutionary political activity. In 1951, PIDE, the security police force of the Estado Novo regime headed by Portuguese Prime Minister Salazar, arrested him for his separatist activism, and he was held for three months. The following year, in 1952, he was arrested again for joining the Portuguese Movement for Democratic Youth Unity. In 1955, he was arrested for a third time and held until 1957.

Following his release, he finished his studies. The same day as his graduation, he married Maria Eugénia da Silva, a 23-year-old Portuguese woman from Trás-os-Montes. In 1959, he returned to Angola. In 1960, he was arrested for a fourth time, but escaped from prison and went on to assume leadership in the armed struggle against colonial rule.

== Career ==
=== Angolan politics ===
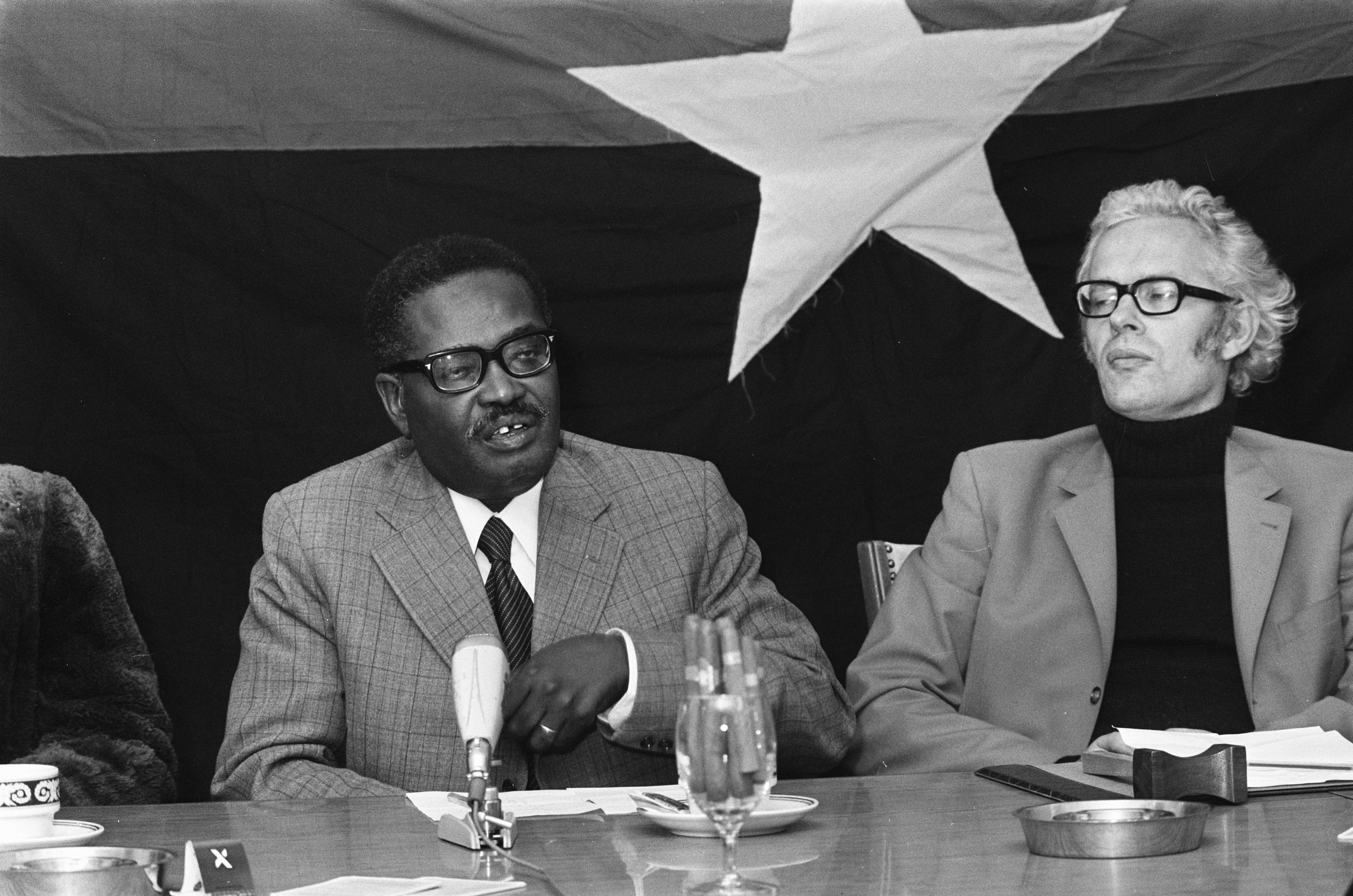
Neto and Sietse Bosgra in the Netherlands in 1975

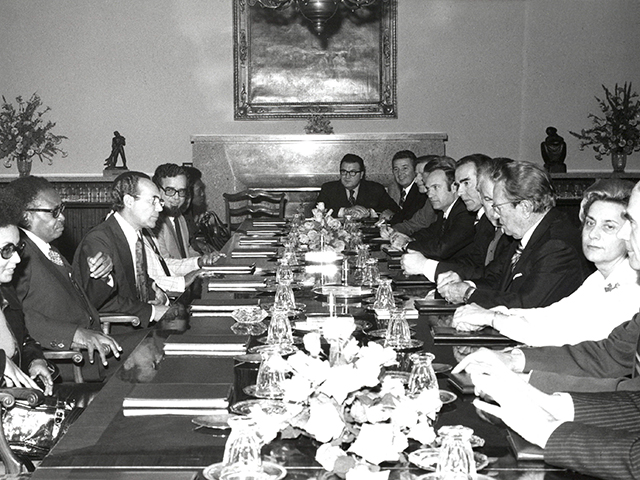
Neto participating in Yugoslav-Angolan talks with Marshal Tito in the White Villa, Brijuni Islands, during Neto's visit to Yugoslavia in 1977

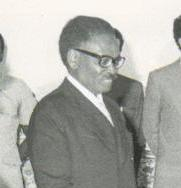
Neto in 1978

In December 1956, the Angolan Communist Party (PCA) merged with the Party of the United Struggle for Africans in Angola (PLUAA) to form the Popular Movement for the Liberation of Angola with Viriato da Cruz, the President of the PCA, as Secretary General and Neto as president.

The Portuguese authorities in Angola arrested Neto on 8 June 1960. His patients and supporters marched for his release from Bengo to Catete, but were stopped when Portuguese soldiers shot at them, killing 30 and wounding 200 in what became known as the Massacre of Ícolo e Bengo. At first Portugal's government exiled Neto to Cape Verde. Then, once more, he was sent to jail in Lisbon. After international protests were made to Salazar's administration urging Neto's release, Neto was freed from prison and put under house arrest. From this he escaped, going first to Morocco and then to Congo-Léopoldville. During this period, he adopted his war name and pseudonym as a writer, Manguxi Kilamba, a Kimbundu language term meaning "immortal guide," "conductor of the spirit of the people," or "wisest among men". The name Kilamba would become part of his given name starting in 1976.

In 1962, Neto visited Washington, D.C., and asked the Kennedy administration for aid in his war against Portugal. The U.S. government turned him down, because it had oil interests in colonial Angola, choosing instead to support Holden Roberto's comparatively anti-Communist National Liberation Front of Angola (FNLA).

In 1965, Neto met Che Guevara and began receiving support from Cuba. He visited Havana several times, and he and Fidel Castro shared similar ideological views.

In February 1973, Neto and MPLA visited Romania to meet with Dictator (Conducător) Nicolae Ceaușescu on a four day official trip between 12–16 February, to discuss political matters in Africa. On 17 February Neto visited Bulgaria along with Lúcio Lara, Ruth Neto and other party officials where he also sought support from the Bulgarian authorities, as well as meeting with some of the MPLA students in Bulgaria amongst them was also Dino Matrosse – who later became the MPLA General Secretary. The MPLA delegation then continued with their official trip to Yugoslavia on 18–22 February to meet with President Josip Broz Tito. Neto spent most of his time in 1973 in Europe, where he visited Oslo, in Norway, and on 2 July he was in Geneva. On 15–16 July Tito and Ceausescu met in Yugoslavia to discuss the situation in Angola,

Following the Carnation Revolution in Portugal during April 1974 (which deposed Salazar's successor Marcelo Caetano), three political factions vied for Angolan power. One of the three was the MPLA, to which Neto belonged. On 11 November 1975, Angola achieved full independence from the Portuguese, and Neto became the nation's ruler after the MPLA seized Luanda at the expense of the other anti-colonial movements. He established a one-party state and his government developed close links with the Soviet Union and other nations in the Eastern Bloc and other Communist states, particularly Cuba, which aided the MPLA considerably in its war with the FNLA, the National Union for the Total Independence of Angola (UNITA) and South Africa. Neto made the MPLA declare Marxism-Leninism its official doctrine. As a consequence, he violently repressed a movement later called Fractionism which in 1977 attempted a coup d'état inspired by the Organização dos Comunistas de Angola. In December 1977 at their first congress, they changed their name to MPLA-PT (MPLA Partido do Trabalho) officially adopting the Marxist-Leninist ideology, requested by Nito Alves. Tens of thousands of followers (or alleged followers) of Nito Alves were executed in the aftermath of the attempted coup, over a period that lasted up to two years, although Agostinho Neto only ratified the death sentence of Nito Alves. After corresponding with several relatives of the disappeared, Neto decided to dissolve the Directorate of Information and Security for the "excesses" they had committed.

According to his sons, President Neto never assigned business or privileges to them, suggesting that despite a controversial presidency he never forgot his humble origins.

=== Author ===
Agostinho Neto's poetic works were written chiefly between 1946 and 1960, largely in Portugal. He published three books of poetry during his lifetime. Several of his poems became national anthems. Poems included collections like Sacred Hope, which was published in 1974 (Titled Dry Eyes in the Portuguese Version). He was also the first member voted into the Anglo Writers Union and The Center for African Studies in Lisbon. He was later awarded the Lotus Prize presented by the Conference of Afro-Asian Writers.

== Death ==
Agostinho Neto died on 10 September 1979 in Moscow after travelling to the Soviet Union to undergo surgery for cancer and hepatitis. He was a week shy of his 57th birthday at the time of his death. Neto had a long battle with pancreatic cancer, as well as chronic hepatitis that ultimately took his life. Neto had been to the Soviet Union multiple times for treatment because of the high level of medical professionals there. Few people knew about his failing health because he and his colleagues thought it was better to hide this information, as to not show weakness.

== Legacy ==
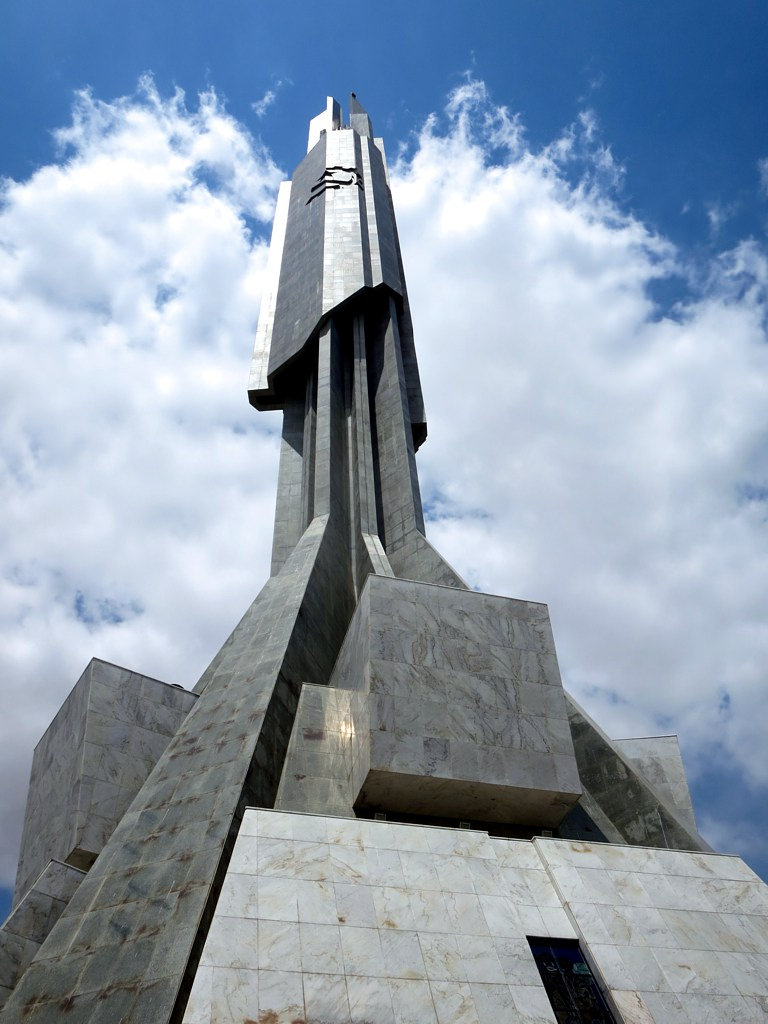
The Mausoleum of António Agostinho Neto in Luanda

The Soviet Union awarded Neto the Lenin Peace Prize for 1975–76.

The public university of Luanda, the Agostinho Neto University, is named after him. A poem by Chinua Achebe entitled "Agostinho Neto" was written in his honour. An airport in Santo Antão, Cape Verde, is named after him, due to the beloved work he performed there as a doctor. For the same reason, the main hospital of Cape Verde in the capital Praia is named "Hospital Agostinho Neto" (HAN). There is also a morna dedicated to him. A street in New Belgrade in Serbia is named after him, the Dr Agostina Neta street.

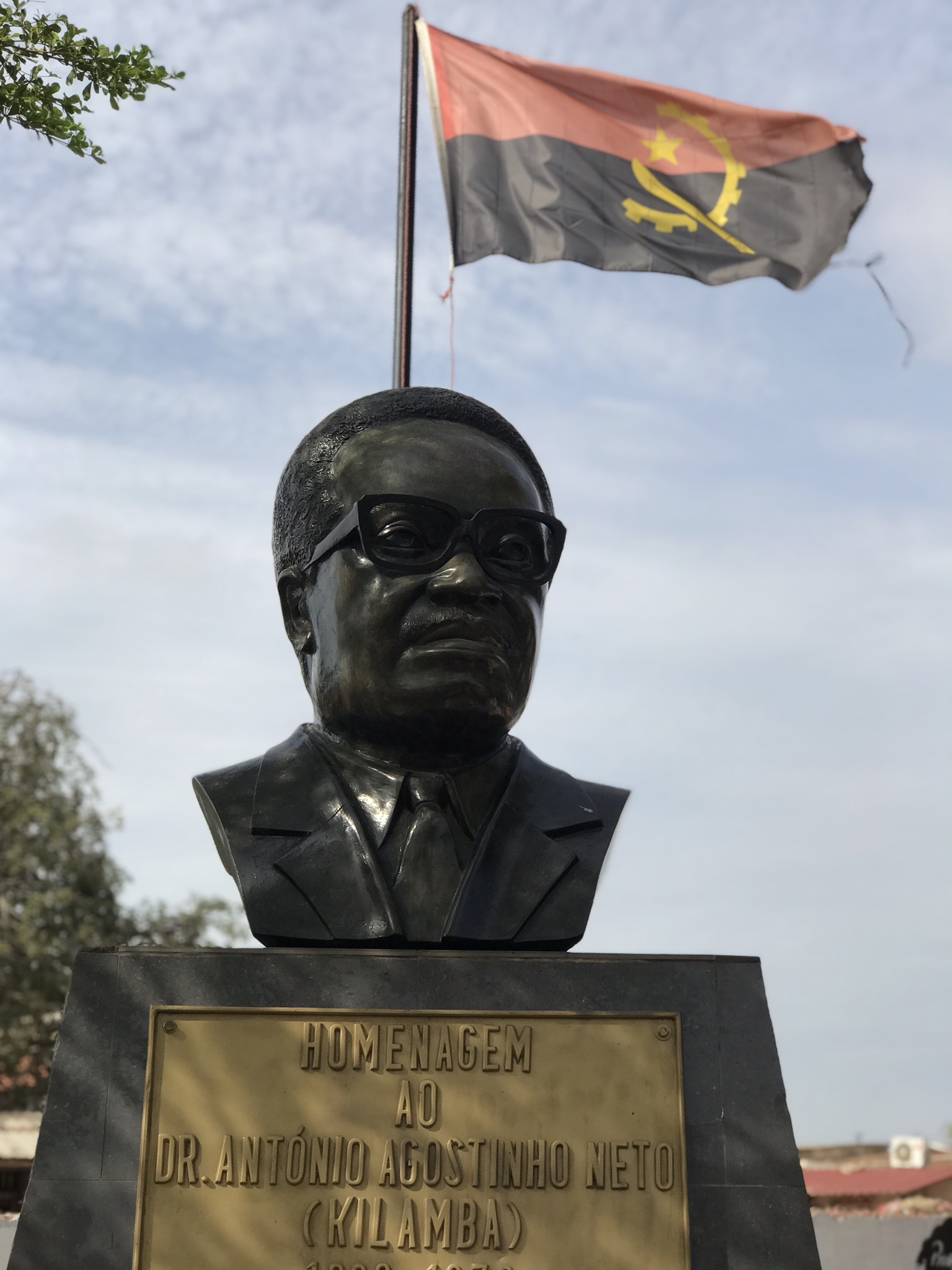
A bust of Neto

A street in Ghana (Agostinho Neto Road), which can be found in Airport City in the capital, is named after him.

Luanda's new airport located in Neto's birthplace, Icolo e Bengo Province, opened in 2024 and is also named after him.

On 17–19 July 1973, The Congress was held at The July Plenum in Sofia organised by the Bulgarian Communist Party leader Todor Zhivkov, and also attended by Neto who at the time stayed in Hotel Rila. During that period he had a brief relationship with a Bulgarian woman with whom he had met earlier in the same year on 17 February and they had a daughter Mihaela. A DNA test performed in 2013 concluded with 95% confidence that she is Neto's daughter.

== Foreign honours ==
- Cape Verde
  - Order of Amílcar Cabral, First Class
- Cuba
  - Recipient of the Order of Playa Girón
- Guinea
  - Grand Cross of the National Order of Merit
- Namibia
  - Order of the Welwitschia
- Poland
  - Order of Merit of the Republic of Poland, First Class
- South Africa
  - Supreme Commander of the Order of the Companions of O. R. Tambo
- Soviet Union
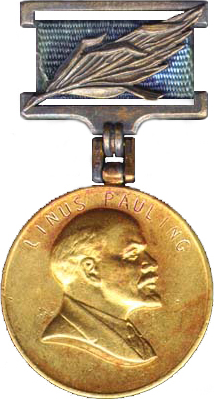
  - Lenin Peace Prize
- Yugoslavia
  - Order of the Yugoslav Star
- Zimbabwe
  - Recipient of the Royal Order of Munhumutapa

Political offices
Preceded by Position created	President of Angola; 1975–1979	Succeeded by Lúcio Lara (Acting)
