= Portuguese Navy =

Naval branch of the Portuguese Armed Forces

- Marinha Portuguesa
- Founded: 12 December 1317
- Country: Portugal
- Type: Navy
- Size: 8,200 military 620 paramilitary 79 ships 5 aircraft units
- Part of: Portuguese Armed Forces
- Headquarters: Alfeite Naval Base, Lisbon
- Patron: Henry the Navigator
- Mottos: Ships motto: Honrai a Pátria que a Pátria vos contempla (English: "Honor the Fatherland for the Fatherland beholds you"); Heraldic motto: Talant de bien faire (English: "Wiling to do well"); Battle cry: São Jorge (English: "Saint George")
- Anniversaries: Royal Charter of King Denis: 12 December 1317; Sea route to India by Vasco da Gama: 20 May 1498; Discovery of Brazil by Pedro Álvares Cabral: 22 April 1500
- Website: https://www.marinha.pt/pt

Commanders
- Chief of Staff: Admiral Jorge Nobre de Sousa

Insignia
- Ensign

- Pennant

- Jack

The Portuguese Navy (Portuguese: Marinha Portuguesa), also known as the Portuguese War Navy (Marinha de Guerra Portuguesa) or as the Portuguese Armada (Armada Portuguesa), is the navy of the Portuguese Armed Forces. Chartered in 1317 by King Denis of Portugal, it is the oldest continuously serving navy in the world; in 2017, the Portuguese Navy commemorated the 700th anniversary of its official creation.

The Navy played a key role in Portuguese maritime exploration during the Age of Discovery in the 15th and 16th centuries. The result of these technical and scientific discoveries led Portugal to develop advanced ships, including the caravel, new and more sophisticated types of carracks for interoceanic travel and the oceanic galleon, and to find the sea route to the East and routes to South America and Northern North America.

Bartolomeu Dias rounded the southern tip of Africa and Vasco da Gama reached India, linking Europe and Asia for the first time by ocean route, as well as the Atlantic and the Indian oceans. This led to the discovery of Brazil in the first expeditions that linked Europe, Africa, the New World, and Asia on a single voyage, such as the expedition of Pedro Álvares Cabral, and through the skills and experience of their navigators in the Atlantic, the Indian Ocean, and in the Far East, also contributed to the technical and geographical advance of other European navies, such as the first circumnavigation by Ferdinand Magellan (including, in the expedition, other captains, sailors and pilots), sailing across the Atlantic and the Pacific Ocean.

From the late 15th century until the late 16th century, the Portuguese Navy was one of the most powerful maritime forces in the world. For most of the 16th century, the Portuguese India Armadas and fleets, then the world leader in shipbuilding and naval artillery and technology, dominated most of the Atlantic Ocean south of the Canary Islands, the Indian Ocean and the access to the western Pacific.

Following the Iberian Union, the Portuguese Empire and its maritime power began to be overtaken by other newly emerging European imperial powers, although the Portuguese Navy still saw periods of prestige and expansion such as the reign of King John V of Portugal.

Today, the Portuguese Navy assumes a dual role capacity: naval combat missions to assure Portugal's sovereignty and international commitments, and coast guard operations in its territorial waters and areas of influence. The Portuguese Navy also participates in missions related with international commitments assumed by Portugal (mainly within NATO), as well as missions of civil interest.

Ships of the Portuguese Navy use the ship prefix NRP for Navio da República Portuguesa, (Ship of the Portuguese Republic).

== History ==
=== Creation of the Portuguese Navy ===
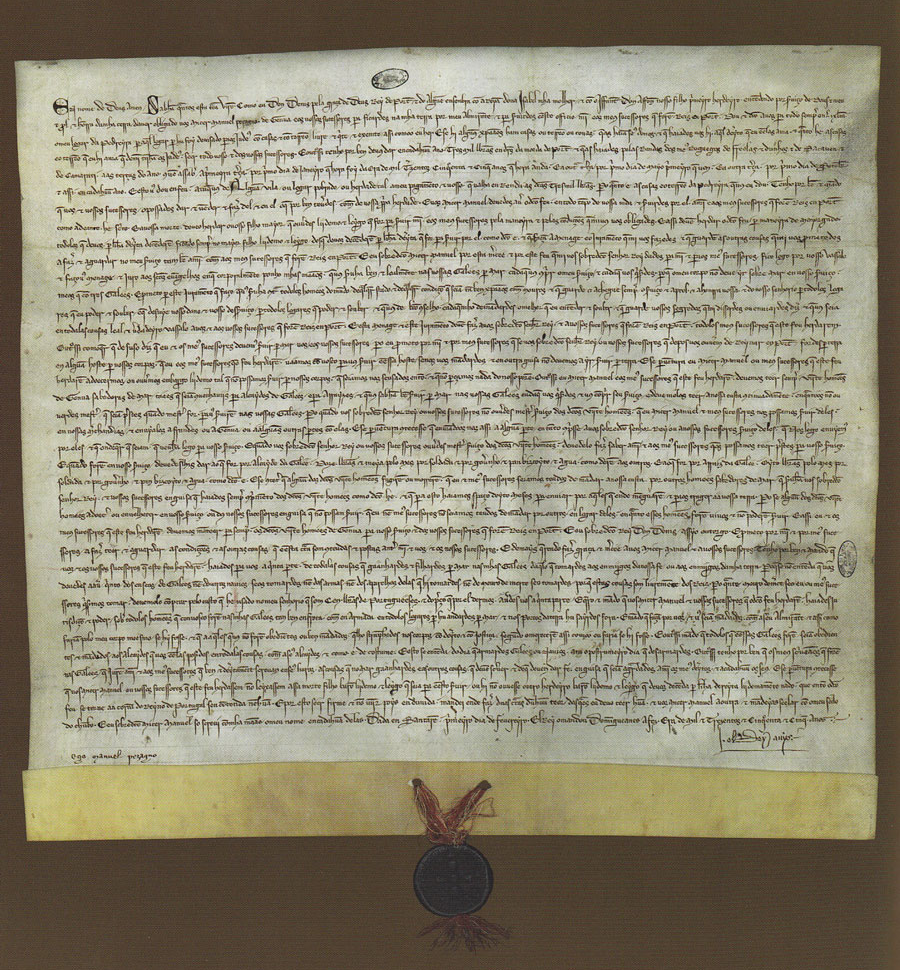
King Dinis's 1317 charter formally establishing a permanent naval force and appointing Manuel Pessanha as the first Admiral of Portugal.

The first historically known battle involving Portuguese naval forces happened in 1180, during the reign of Portugal's first king, Afonso I. The battle occurred off Cape Espichel, with a Portuguese naval squadron, commanded by the knight Fuas Roupinho, defeating a Muslim naval squadron. Fuas Roupinho also made two incursions at Ceuta, in 1181 and 1182, and died during the latter of these attempts to conquer the North African city. During the 13th century, in the Reconquista, the Portuguese naval forces helped in the conquest of several coastal Moorish towns, like Alcácer do Sal, Silves and Faro. It was also used in the battles against Castile—through incursions in Galicia and Andalusia—and also in joint actions with other Christian fleets against the Muslims.

King Denis gave a permanent organization to his naval forces, appointing Manuel Pessanha of Genoa to be the first Admiral of the Kingdom, on the 12 December 1317. This is considered the official date of foundation of the Portuguese Navy, with its 700 years being commemorated on the 12 December 2017. In 1321, the Portuguese Navy successfully attacked Muslim ports in North Africa. Maritime insurance began in 1323 in Portugal. Between 1336 and 1341, the first attempts at maritime expansion were made, with an expedition to the Canary Islands, sponsored by King Afonso IV. In the context of the 1383–85 Crisis, the Portuguese Navy took an active participation in the war against Castile.

A Portuguese naval campaign conducted in Galicia led to the conquest of the coastal towns of Baiona, A Coruña and Neda, as well as the destruction of the naval base of Ferrol and of several ships that were on the way to reinforce the Castilian forces that were besieging Lisbon. In July 1384, the Portuguese Navy was able to break the Castilian siege of Lisbon and to supply the city, defeating the Castilian Navy in the naval battle of the Tagus.

=== Age of Exploration ===
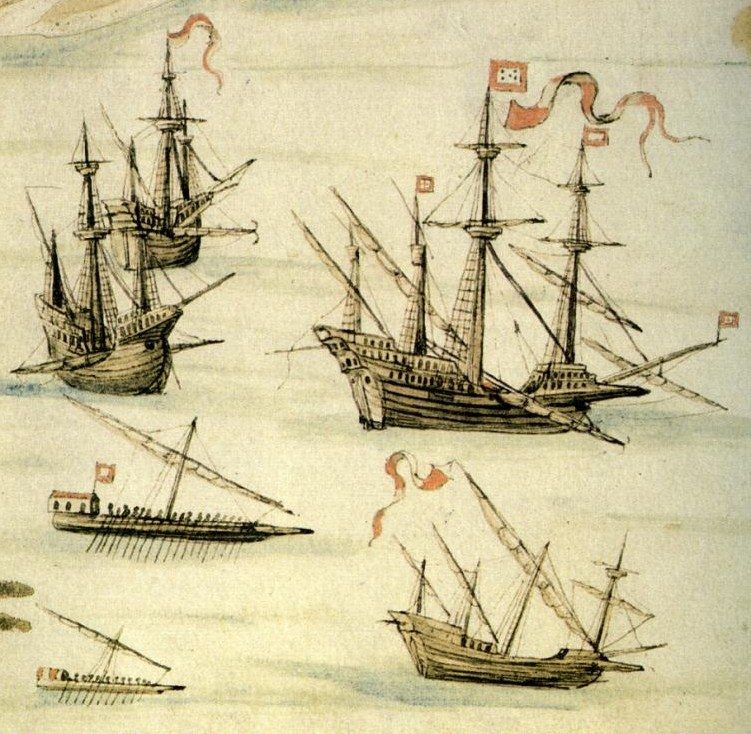
Depiction of the Expedition to Suez led by João de Castro in 1541, showing the main types of Portuguese ships that operated in the Indian Ocean in the 16th century, including two carracks, a galleon, two galleys and a round square caravel

In the beginning of the 15th century, the country entered a period of peace and stability. Europe was still involved in wars and feudal conflicts which allowed Portugal to be the only capable country to methodically and successfully start the exploration of the Atlantic. Portuguese expansion during the 15th century can be divided in:

- Territorial expansion to North Africa
- Hydrographic survey of the African coast and Canary Islands
- Oceanographic and meteorological survey of the Atlantic Ocean
- Development of navigation techniques and methods

Territorial expansion began in Morocco with the conquest of Ceuta in 1415. Exploration in the west African coast started in 1412 and ended with the crossing of the Cape of Good Hope in 1488. After his return from Ceuta, Henry the navigator founded a school of navigation in Sagres.The vessel employed in the beginning of the Discoveries was the caravel, varying from 50 to 160 tons. The first results came soon when Gonçalves Zarco discovered Porto Santo Island in 1419 and Madeira Island in 1420, and Diogo de Silves discovered the azorean island of Santa Maria in 1427. In 1424, Gil Eanes crosses the Cape Bojador. Diogo Cão and Bartolomeu Dias arrived to the mouth of the Zaire River in 1482.

In the same year, the São Jorge da Mina castle was built on the coast of Western Africa, by Diogo de Azambuja, becoming one of the most important Portuguese naval bases. The structure exists to this day and is a robust example of slave trade in this era. In 1488, Bartolomeu Dias became the first European to sail around the southernmost tip of Africa, the Cape of Good Hope. João Vaz Corte-Real arrived at Newfoundland in 1473. Part of the coast of Newfoundland was charted by the Corte-Real brothers, sons of João Vaz Corte-Real, in a failed attempt to find the Northwest Passage in 1501. In 1499, João Fernandes Lavrador and Pero de Barcelos arrive in Labrador ( named after João Fernandes Lavrador ) and map its coast.

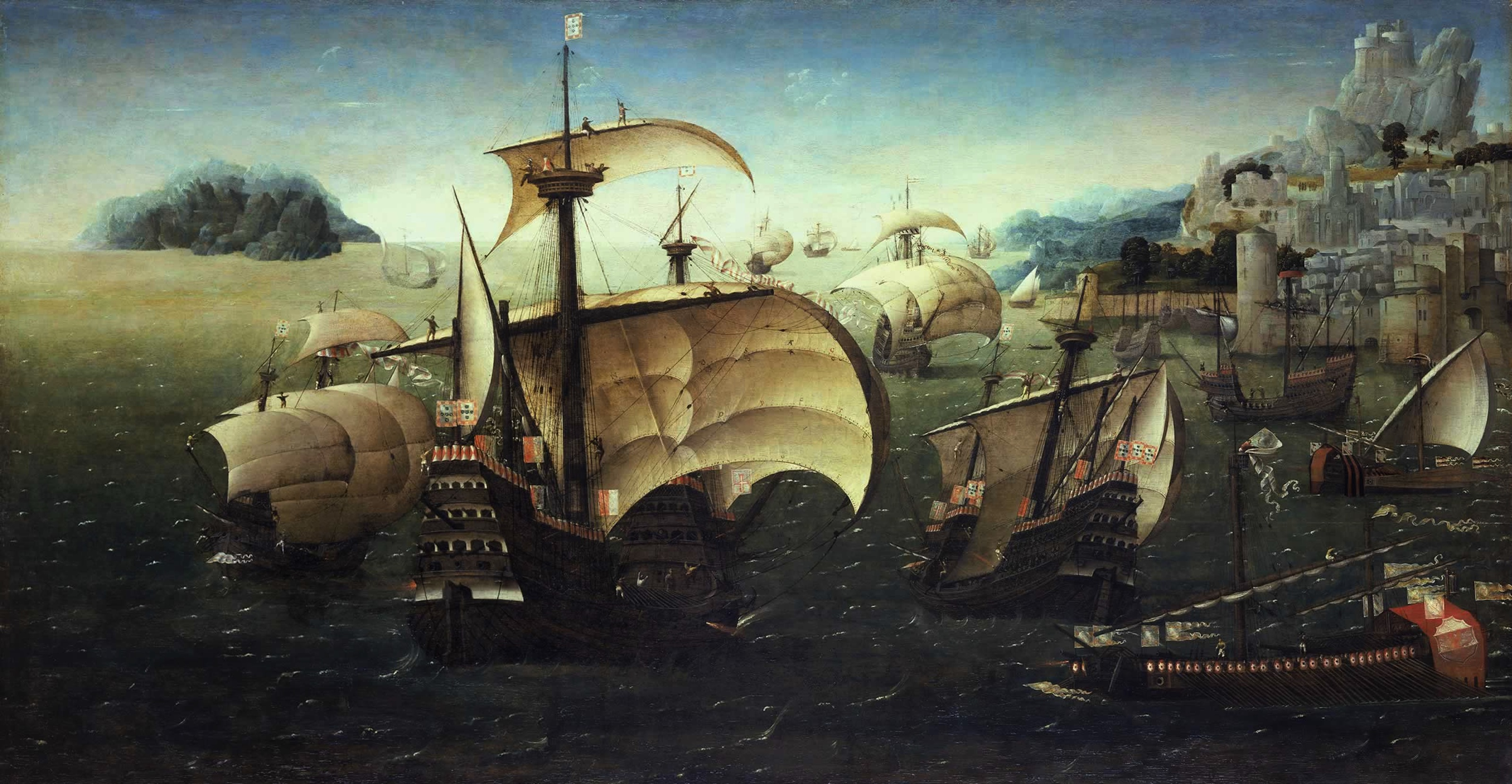
The carrack Santa Catarina do Monte Sinai and other Portuguese Navy' ships in the 16th century

The greatest achievement of these exploration voyages was attained by Vasco da Gama, who in 1498 became the European discoverer of the sea route to India. In 1500, when leading a second Portuguese Armada of 13 ships to India, Pedro Álvares Cabral discovered and explored Brazil, claiming it for Portugal. In the same year, Diogo Dias, as one of the Captains of the fleet to India of Pedro Álvares Cabral, is separated from the main fleet by a storm while crossing the Cape of Good Hope, and becomes the first European to reach Madagascar. Besides the already existing role of Admiral of Portugal, the Crown creates the role of Admiral of India, whose first holder becomes Vasco da Gama in 1500.

With the first established sea route to the Indian Ocean, the Portuguese started to use the carrack ship (nau in Portuguese). Nevertheless, the Portuguese penetration in the Indian Ocean was not peaceful due to the opposition of the Muslims. However, in 1509 Francisco de Almeida had a tremendous victory over the Muslims in the naval Battle of Diu, and the Portuguese presence and dominance in the area is definitely attained. In Morocco the Portuguese conquests continued and they took over the cities of Safim, Azamor, Mazagão and Mogador. In the Far East, Portuguese navigators continue their progress visiting the southeast of Asia, China in 1517 and Australia in 1522. In the same period they reached Taiwan (baptizing it Formosa) and Japan where they became the first Europeans to arrive.

They entered the Red Sea in 1542 to destroy the Ottoman armada in Suez. In the West the Portuguese visited the coast of New England in 1520, California in 1542 and Hudson Bay in 1588. All of these actions were only possible with the naval capability and the navigation knowledge of the Portuguese navigators, as well as their courage and determination. In 1520, King Manuel I organized the Portuguese Navy in three permanent armadas (fleets): the Armada of the Coast (for coastal patrol), the Armada of the Islands (based in the Azores, for the protection of the ocean navigation in the North Atlantic) and the Armada of the Strait (operating in the area of the Strait of Gibraltar, to protect the navigation with North Africa and the Mediterranean). The first two fleets were mostly made of ships of the line (carracks and galleons), while the Strait fleet was mostly made of ships powered by oars (fustas and galleys).

These fleets would subsist until the beginning of the 19th century. Besides the permanent three fleets, the Navy continued to organize the ad hoc India armadas, dispatched to India on an annual basis.To aid the Christian forces to conquest Tunis in 1535, King John III sent the Portuguese galleon Botafogo, the world's most powerful warship of the time, armed with between 80 and 200 guns and under the command of the brother of the King, Louis, Duke of Beja. In 1567, a Portuguese naval squadron, under the command of Mem de Sá, took Fort Coligny and expelled the French from the Guanabara Bay.

=== Habsburg dynasty ===
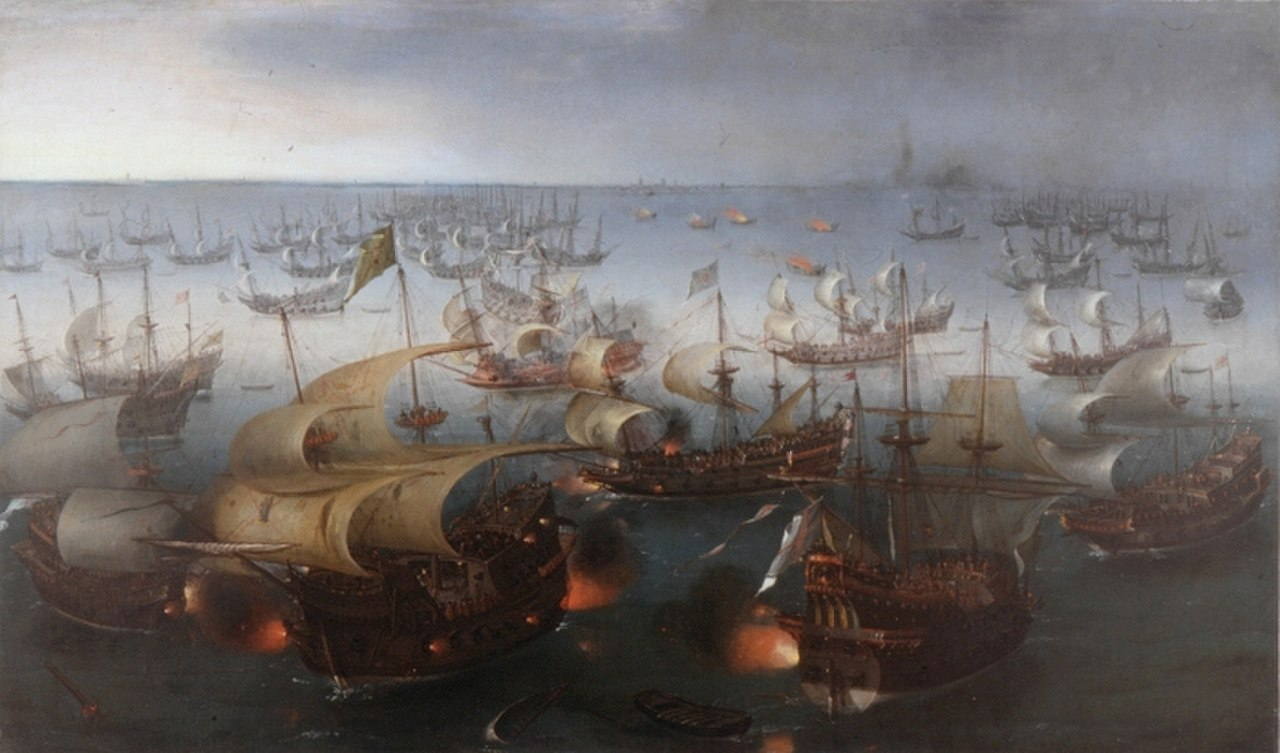
The Portuguese galleon São Martinho, flagship of the Spanish Armada, in the Battle of Gravelines

Following the Portuguese succession crisis of 1580 and having defeated António, Prior of Crato in the War of the Portuguese Succession, the Habsburg Philip II of Spain became King of Portugal as Philip I. Under the Iberian Union, Portugal continued to be formally an independent kingdom with its own Navy, but its foreign and naval policies became increasingly subordinate to and oriented by Spanish interests. The Portuguese Navy was soon ordered by King Philip to contribute to the Spanish Armada intended to invade England, although England was an old ally of Portugal. Portugal provided the most powerful squadron of ships of the Armada, including its flagship, the galleon São Martinho (called the San Martin by the Spanish). The Portuguese participation included a squadron of nine galleons (a tenth galleon provided by Tuscany was added to the squadron) and two zabras, and another squadron of four galleys, with a total of 16 vessels and more than 5,800 men. This expedition culminated in the naval battle of Gravelines.

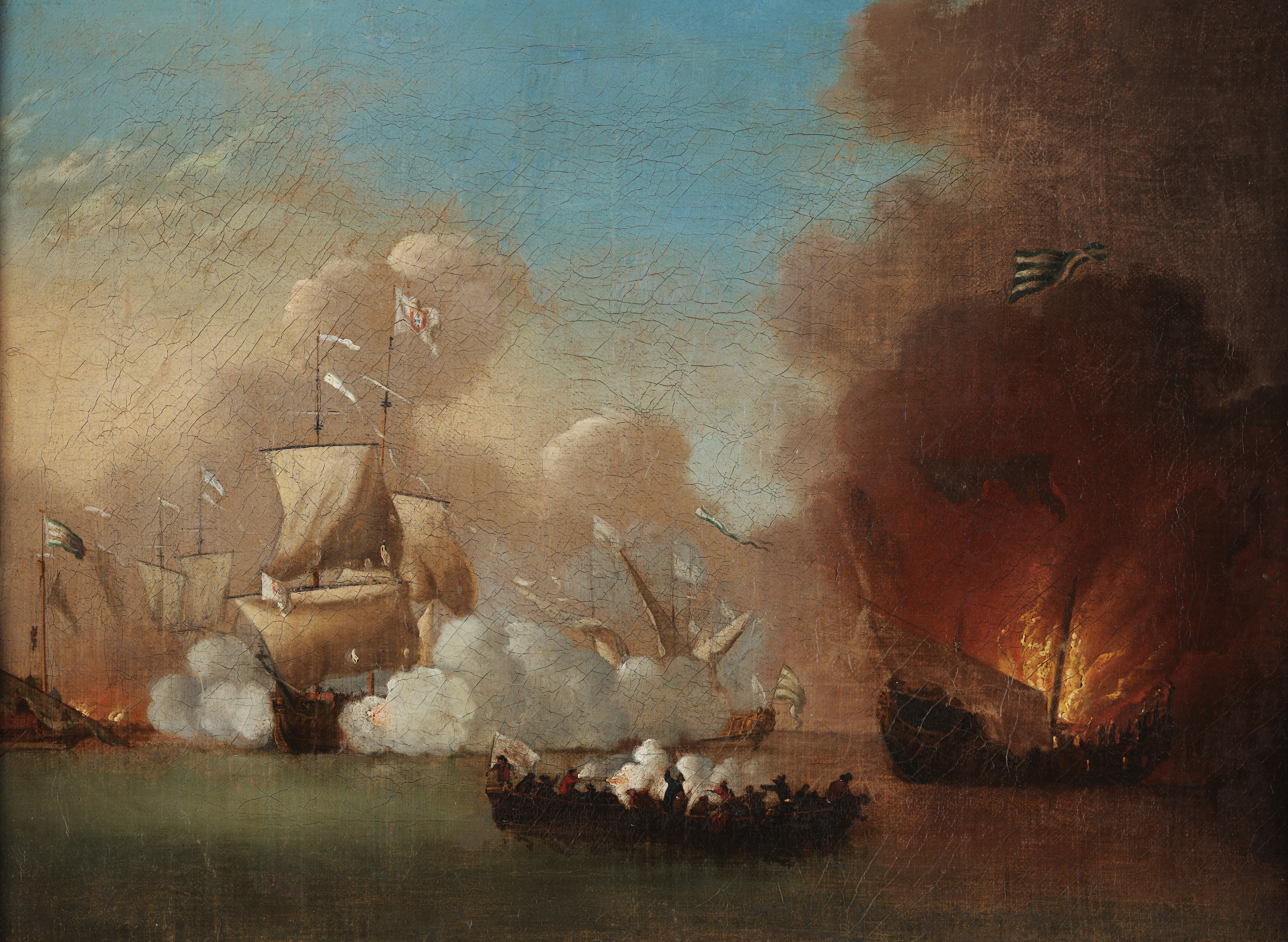
Two Portuguese ships repelling an attack by Barbary pirates from Tunis during the Barbary–Portuguese conflicts in the 17th century

Linked to Spain by a dual monarchy, Portugal saw its large Empire being attacked by the English, the French and the Dutch, all enemies of Spain. The reduced Portuguese population (around one million) was not sufficient to successfully resist so many enemies, and the Empire began a slow decline. During the Iberian Union, the Portuguese Navy was still involved in several other conflicts and maintained an important role in the fight against pirates. António Saldanha, commanding a fleet of 30 carracks, defeated an Ottoman fleet in the Mediterranean and conquered Tunis. Meanwhile, João Queirós accomplished a double crossing of the Pacific Ocean leaving from California.

While specialized troops had long existed to provide artillery and riflemen aboard Portuguese warships, Portugal's first official naval infantry force was founded in 1618 as the Terço of the Navy of the Crown of Portugal (Portuguese: Terço da Armada da Coroa de Portugal), making it the second-oldest marine corps in the world only after the Spanish Marine Infantry and the direct origin of the modern Portuguese Marine Corps.

During 14 days of fighting in February 1625, the Portuguese Navy fought an inconclusive action when a squadron of galleons, commanded by Rui Freire de Andrade, and another one of galleys, commanded by Álvaro Botelho, engaged a combined English and Dutch naval force in the Strait of Hormuz. Following the battle, Persia and Portugal signed a treaty that regulated their commerce in the gulf. It is generally agreed that the treaty was signed in 1625, but the surviving text is undated and it may have been signed as late as 1630. A major joint Portuguese–Spanish naval and military expedition was organized in April 1625 to retake Salvador da Bahia in Brazil from the Dutch, who had captured the city one year before. The Portuguese fleet was commandeered by Manuel de Menezes and counted 22 ships, including the Terço da Armada da Coroa de Portugal, and about 4,000 men.

=== Portuguese Restoration War ===
On 1 December 1640, the Portuguese revolted and restored the full independence of Portugal after 60 years of Spanish domination. To defend its independence, the Portuguese Restoration War had to be fought against the Spanish forces. Although the threat from the powerful Spanish Navy existed, no major naval engagements occurred, with the war being fought mainly on land. At the same time, Portugal made peace agreements with England, France and the Netherlands.

In the period of the Restoration War, the major engagements of the Portuguese Navy were not against the Spanish but against the Dutch, that—despite having signed a peace agreement with the Portuguese—decided to take advantage of the difficult conditions caused by the war effort of Portugal in Europe and to assault and capture some of its colonies in America, Africa and Asia. Despite some important initial setbacks, the Portuguese were finally able to react, repulsing the Dutch assaults on Mozambique, Goa and Macau and recapturing Northeast Brazil, Angola, São Tomé and Ano Bom, in several naval and military campaigns.

=== 18th century ===
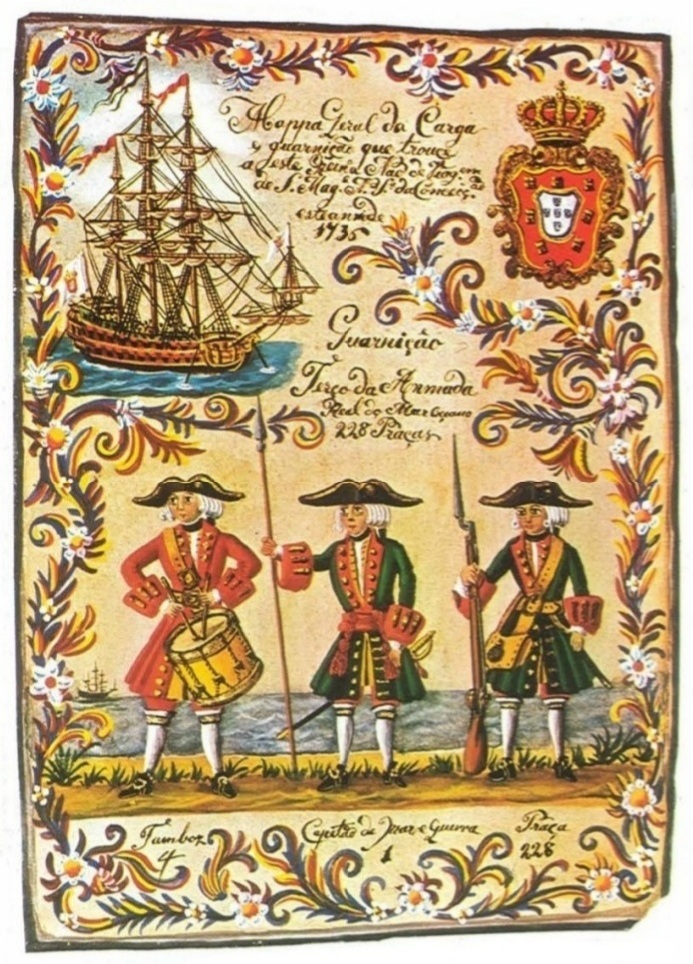
1736 manuscript showing the Portuguese Navy warship Nossa Senhora da Conceição and its garrison of marines from the Terço da Armada. In the 17th and 18th centuries, Portuguese marines were recognisable by their bottle green uniforms

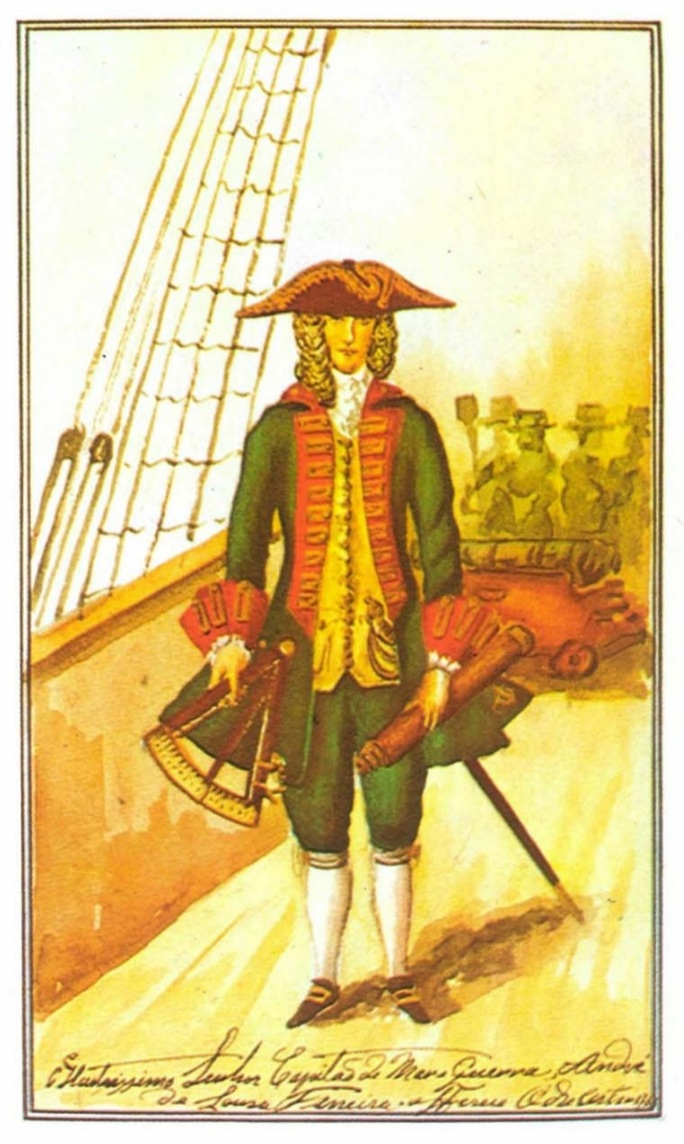
Portrait of the Portuguese Navy captain of sea and war André de Sousa Ferreira in 1751

As the King of Portugal possessed only the ceremonial Royal Guard of the Archers, the marines of the Portuguese Navy's Terço da Armada were also responsible for the role of bodyguard of the Monarchs. During the reign of John V of Portugal, the Portuguese Navy underwent a period of growth and large transformation, as warships started being differentiated from merchant ships.

In 1705, a Portuguese squadron of eight ships of the line was sent to help England against the Franco-Spanish forces that were besieging Gibraltar, which culminated in the Battle of Cabrita Point. At the request of the Republic of Venice and Pope Clement XI, in 1716 the Portuguese Navy sent a fleet to counter the Ottoman Empire's activities in the Mediterranean Sea. This expedition culminated in the Battle of Matapan on 19 July 1717, in which the Portuguese fleet, supported by the Venetian and Maltese navies, defeated the Ottoman Navy.

From 1762 to 1777, Portuguese naval forces in Brazil participated in the several conflicts that occurred with the Spanish in South America, but with limited success. From 1770, under the leadership of Martinho de Melo e Castro, Secretary of State of the Navy, the Portuguese Navy went through large reform and modernization. Incidentally, as part of these reforms, the old procedure of baptizing Portuguese ships with names of Saints was replaced by names of mythical or historical figures and living royals. The Royal Academy of the Midshipmen (Academia Real dos Guardas-Marinhas) was created in 1792, as a university-level naval academy. This Academy is the origin of the present naval schools of Portugal and of Brazil.

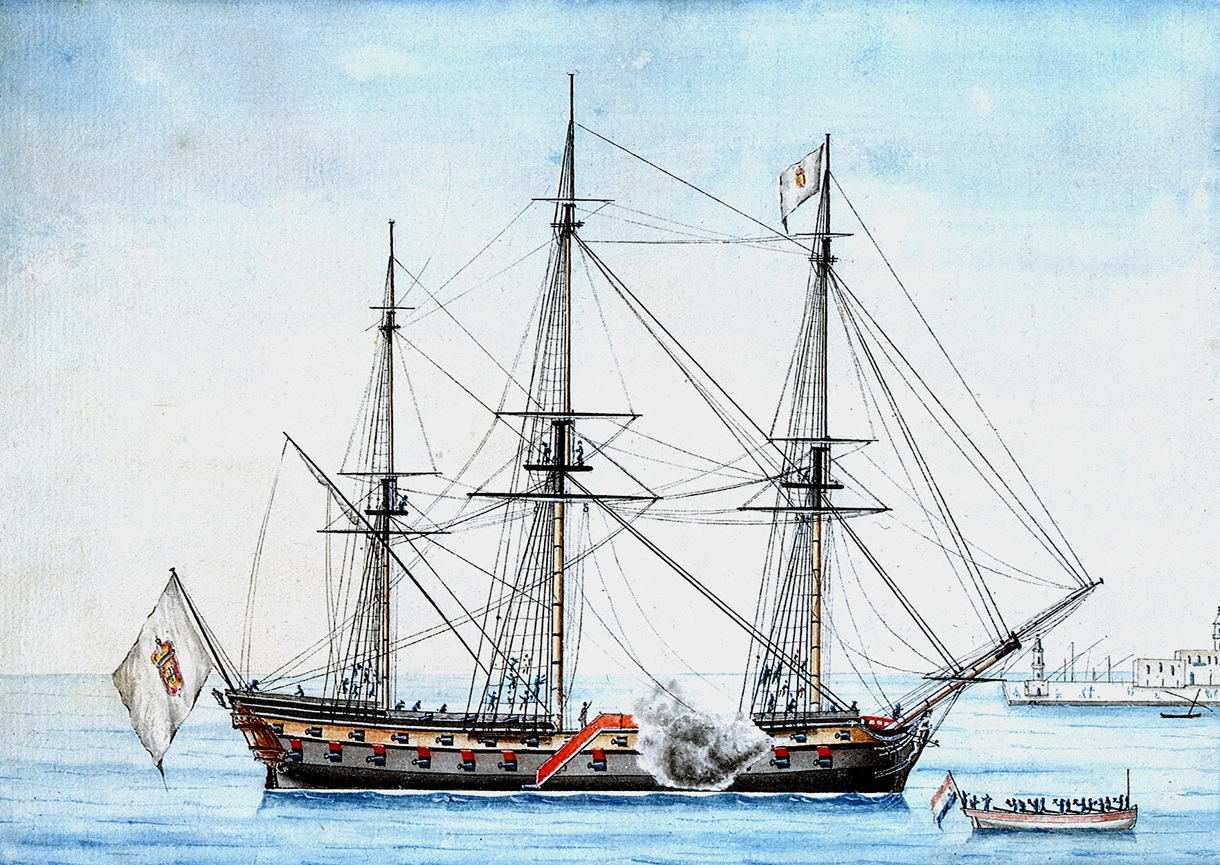
1780 illustration of a Portuguese Navy second-rate

In 1792, the three naval regiments (two of infantry and one of artillery) were reorganized and merged as the Royal Brigade of the Navy (Portuguese: Brigada Real de Marinha). This Brigade was commanded by a flag officer and included divisions of naval artillery, naval infantry and naval artificers, with a total of more than 5000 men. Following the execution of Louis XVI by the French revolutionaries, Portugal entered the First Coalition. In 1793, the Portuguese Navy was tasked with transporting by sea and escorting the Portuguese Expeditionary Army sent to help Spain in the War of the Pyrenees against France. This was done by the Transport Squadron organized with four ships of the line, one frigate, four transport ships and 10 merchant ships.

To aid Britain to defend itself from a possible French invasion, the Portuguese Navy organized and sent the Channel Squadron, with five ships of the line, two frigates, two brigantines and a hospital ship. From July 1794 to March 1796, under the command of António Januário do Valle, the Portuguese Channel Squadron patrolled the English Channel in cooperation with the Royal Navy. The Portuguese Navy ended the 18th century with a fleet that included 13 ships of the line, 16 frigates, three corvettes, 17 brigs and eight support ships. In addition, the Portuguese naval forces also included the Navy of India, based in the Indian Ocean, with a ship of the line and six frigates.

=== Napoleonic Wars and the early 19th century ===
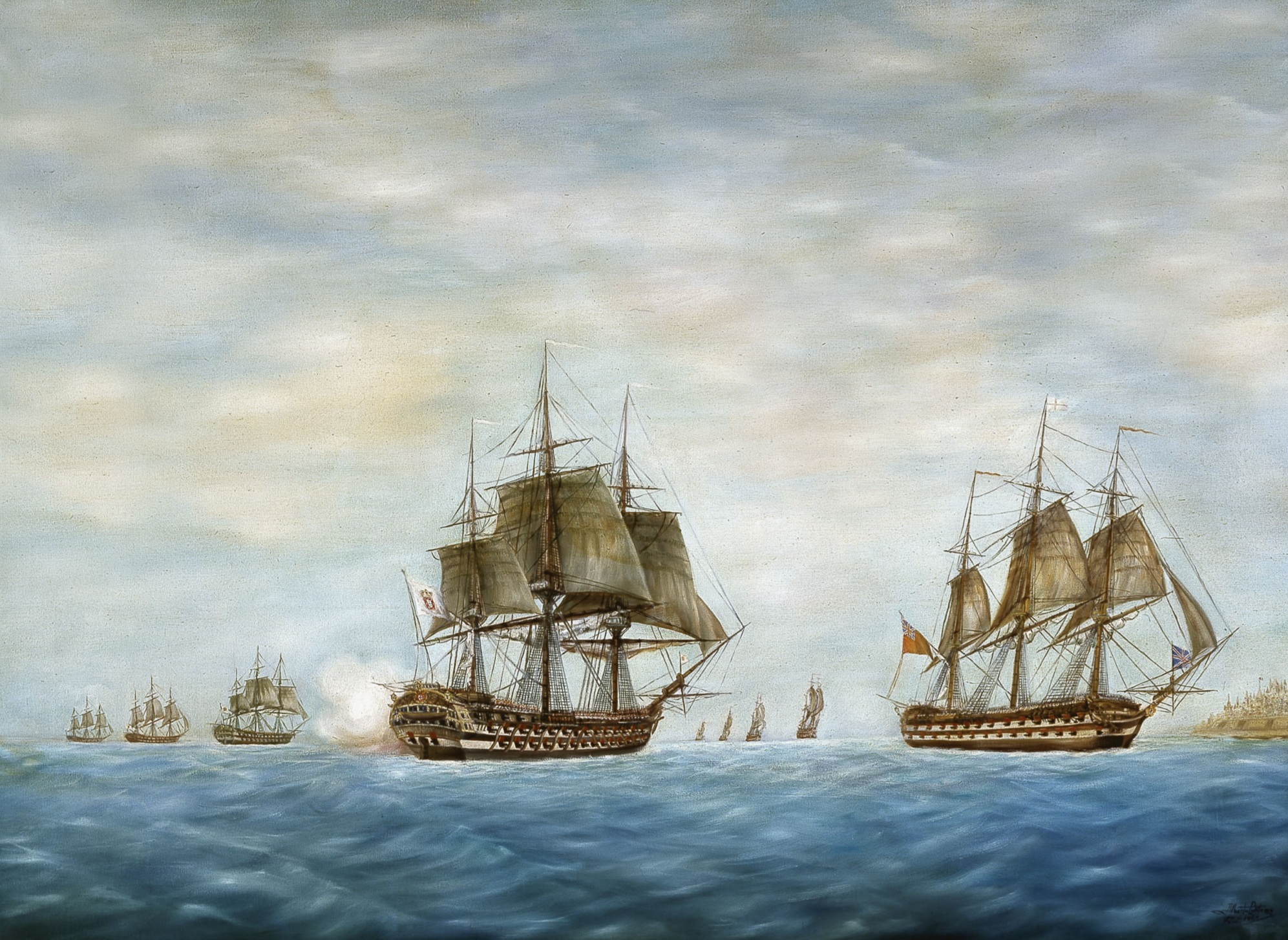
A Portuguese ship of the line saluting a British squadron under Alexander Ball during the siege of Malta

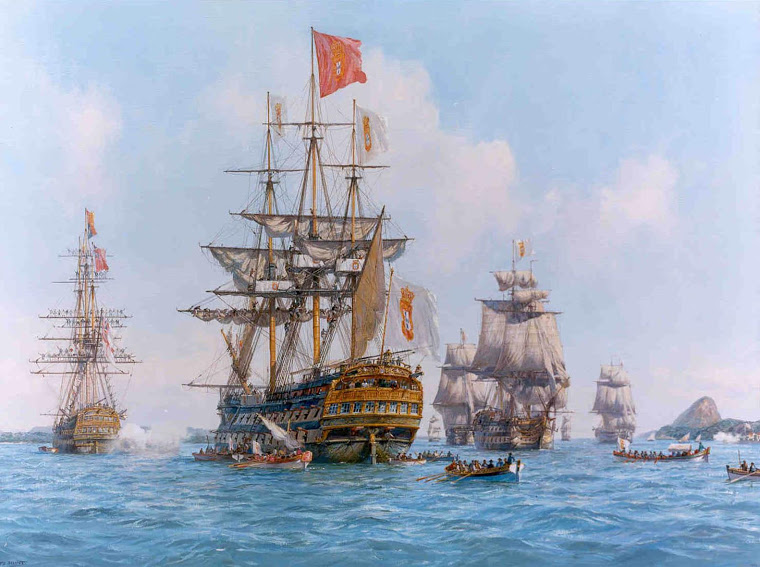
The Anglo-Portuguese fleet carrying the Portuguese court arriving at Guanabara Bay in 1808

In the late 18th century, under the command of the Marquis of Nisa, the Portuguese Navy took part in the Mediterranean campaign of 1798 against the French Republic in Egypt and in the Siege of Malta. In November 1807, General Jean-Andoche Junot invaded Portugal in an attempt to expand Napoleon's continental empire. With insufficient forces to deter the invasion, in order not to be captured and keep the independence of the Kingdom, the Prince Regent John of Portugal activated an ancient strategic plan that foresaw the transfer of the Portuguese court to Brazil. The Prince Regent called upon his navy to execute this mission and, on 29 November 1807, the Royal Family, the Government and 15,000 state and military officials and their families left Lisbon and sailed to Brazil, carried by a Portuguese fleet that included eight ships of the line, five frigates and five other smaller ships.

The 90-gun ship Príncipe Real served as flagship, carrying on board the Prince Regent and his family. The fleet arrived at Bahia on 22 December, and, finally, at Rio de Janeiro on 8 March 1808. The new Portuguese capital was established in Rio de Janeiro. Carried in the fleet, the Royal Academy of Midshipmen also arrived and was installed in the city, as well as a part of the Royal Brigade of the Navy. In retaliation for the French invasion of Portugal, the Portuguese forces in Brazil conquered Cayenne in January 1809. The amphibious invasion was done by a Portuguese naval flotilla supported by a British frigate, a force of 550 marines of the Royal Brigade of the Navy and 700 Brazilian regulars.

While participating in the Napoleonic Wars in the Western Hemisphere, the Portuguese Navy was also engaged in operations in the waters of Southeast Asia. Between November 1809 and February 1810, the Portuguese naval forces based in Macau conducted a campaign against Chinese pirates of the Guangdong Pirate Confederation, defeating them in a series of naval actions in the Bocca Tigris. Political instability dominated Portugal during the 19th century after the Napoleonic invasions. In 1820, after a Revolution in the city of Oporto, the Constitutional regime is established in Portugal. The Parliament in Lisbon required the return of the King from Brazil to Europe. King John VI returns in 1821, leaving his heir, Prince Peter, as regent of Brazil. After a period of political dispute with the Parliament in Lisbon, Prince Peter finally broke with it and declared the independence of Brazil in 1822, becoming its first Emperor, as Peter I.

Peter I was supported by many of the Portuguese naval personnel stationed in Brazil, whose members became citizens of the new country. The new Brazilian Navy was constituted mainly with the Portuguese ships based in Brazil at that time and their respective crews. In the Brazilian War of Independence, naval engagements occurred between the Brazilian Navy and the Portuguese naval forces in Brazil that remained loyal to the Government of Lisbon. However, the engagements were limited by the fact that the Portuguese that constituted the majority of the crews of the Brazilian ships—although loyal to Pedro I—refused to fight against other Portuguese. The conflict ended in 1825, with Portugal recognizing the independence of Brazil in the Treaty of Rio de Janeiro. In the same year, the Royal Academy of Midshipmen in Rio de Janeiro was divided in two, one for Brazil and the other for Portugal, with the students and faculty members that opted for Portuguese nationality returning to Lisbon.

=== Portuguese Civil War ===
Painting of the Battle of Cape St. Vincent by Antoine Léon Morel-Fatio

The death of King John VI in 1826, together with the disputes between the Absolutists and the Liberals, created a succession and political crisis. Being the heir of the Portuguese Crown, Emperor Peter I of Brazil briefly becomes the King of Portugal, as Peter IV, then abdicating in favor of his eldest daughter, who became Queen Mary II, although still a child. This succession was contested by the absolutists, that considered Peter I of Brazil a traitor and so defended that the crown should go to Michael, Peter's younger brother. After a period as Regent of Portugal in name of Mary II, Michael assumes the Crown himself and becomes King Michael I of Portugal in 1828.

These events gave origin to the Portuguese Civil War. Most of the Portuguese Navy would maintain its loyalty towards Michael, with the Liberals—loyal to Peter and Mary—building a new Navy, mostly made up of foreign ships and crews. The War started when the Liberals took control of the Terceira island in the Azores. The Miguelite Navy tried to retake the island in an amphibious operation, but the assault was repulsed by the defenders in the Battle of Praia da Vitória in 1829. The Miguelite fleet continued to blockade the island. In 1831, Peter I abdicated also from the crown of Brazil in favor of his older son, who become Peter II of Brazil, sailed to Britain and then to Terceira island with military reinforcements.

Meanwhile, the French liberal king Louis Philippe—strong supporter of Peter—sends a fleet to Portugal. The French fleet blockades Lisbon and tries to attack the rearguard of the Miguelite Navy that was blockading Terceira, but obtains limited success. Finally, on 11 July 1831, taking advantage of the absence of the bulk of the Miguelite fleet in the waters of the Azores, the French Navy was positioned at the entrance of the Tagus to compel the Miguelist Government to give in to several French demands, with the few operational and undermanned Portuguese warships (only one ship of the line, four frigates and two corvettes) that were in the Tagus not being able to oppose the superior French forces (six ships of the line, three frigates, three corvettes and four brigs).

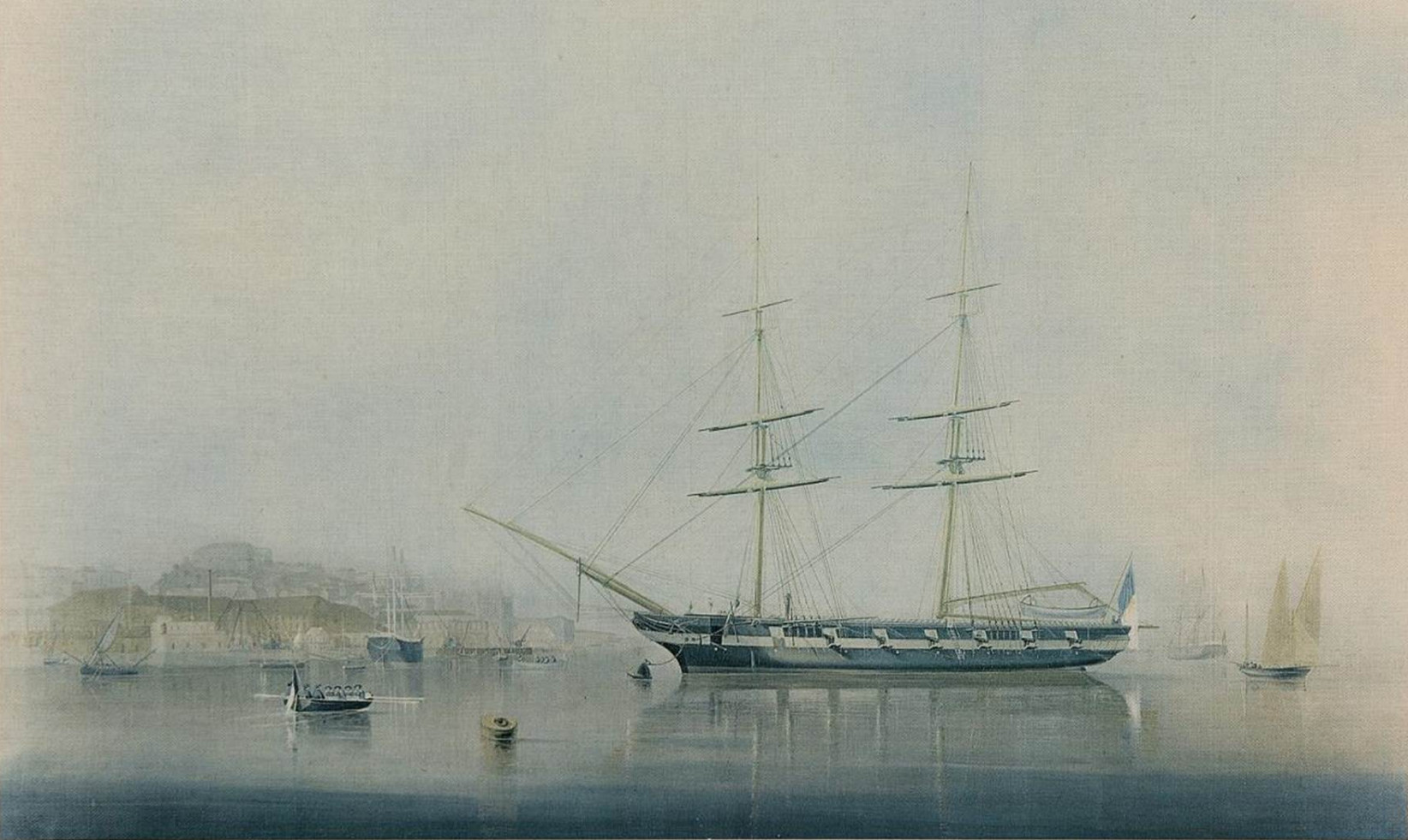
Portuguese brig Pedro Nunes (1856-1871)

Meanwhile, Peter gathers a fleet of about 60 ships, under the command of George Rose Sartorius, that on 8 July 1832, disembarks a force of 7500 men near Mindelo, from where they advance to the nearby city of Oporto, taking it on the next day. The Liberal army becomes them under siege inside Oporto by the Miguelite army that concentrates around the city. A dead-lock occurs then during an entire year, with neither the Miguelite forces being able to take the city neither the Liberal ones being able to break the siege. To break the impasse, the Liberals then decide to open another front in the rearguard of the enemy forces. A naval fleet sails from Oporto on 20 June 1833—with half of the Liberal army on board—and disembarks it in the Algarve. On the return voyage, the Liberal fleet under the command of Charles Napier encounters and defeats the Miguelite fleet under the command of Manuel António Marreiros in the Battle of Cape St. Vincent on 5 July 1833. The Civil War finally ended on 24 May 1834, when Michael I signed the Concession of Evoramonte, renouncing all claims to the Portuguese throne.

The long period of conflict ranging from the Napoleonic Wars to the end of the Civil War weakened the country and caused a sharp decline of its Navy. This decline was further reinforced due to the mutual mistrust between the Liberal politicians and the Navy due their past in the Civil War, symbolized by the disagreement between Queen Mary II and the Navy which caused the Navy to not receive regimental colors during the whole Constitutional Monarchy, with its landed forces always parading carrying a simple guidon. This mistrust resulted in a lack of priority given by the Government towards the Navy, with a neglecting in the investment in the naval forces for many years. In this period, the Portuguese Navy lost most of its capacity as a global blue-water navy, becoming a small naval force limited to having merely the capacity to patrol the littoral zone of Portugal and perform naval policing of the Portuguese colonies.

=== Late 19th century to World War I ===
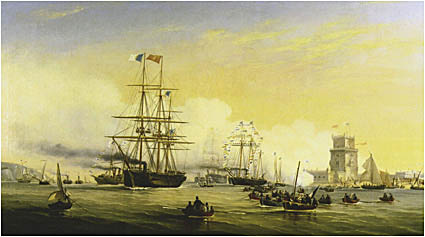
The mixed propulsion corvette Bartolomeu Dias and other Portuguese warships arriving at the Tagus with Queen Stephanie on board, in 1859

In the 1830s, the Portuguese Navy incorporated its first steamships. The last Portuguese ship of the line, the 80-gun Vasco da Gama, was built in Lisbon in 1841 and the last sailing frigate, the 60-gun Dom Fernando II e Glória, was built in Daman (Portuguese India) in 1845. From the late 1850s, the Navy gradually replaced its sailing ships by steam or mixed propulsion ships, its principal warships becoming the mixed-propulsion corvettes for the high seas operations and the gunships mainly for coastal and colonial patrols. In 1880, the Portuguese fleet included an armored corvette, six corvettes, 13 gunships, three training ships and four support ships.

At the end of the 19th century, and especially following the Berlin Conference called for by Portugal, the Navy participated in the Portuguese exploration and mapping of the interior of Africa. Out of the Portuguese explorers of the African hinterland stood out the naval officers Hermenegildo Capelo, Brito Capelo and Roberto Ivens, who made several expeditions starting in the late 1870s. Hermenegildo Capelo and Roberto Ivens made the first land connection between Angola and Mozambique, crossing the interior of Africa by unexplored territory, leaving the west coast in January 1884 and arriving at the east coast in September 1885.

In this period, the Navy also focused on the mission of the naval defense of Lisbon, complementing its ground defense. This was part of the national strategy which considered that the defense of Portugal would be assured by the defense of its capital and most important city. As part of this mission, in 1876, the Portuguese Navy acquired the ironclad Vasco da Gama, its first armored vessel, intended to operate as a floating coastal defense battery. The plans for the naval defense of Lisbon would also include the use of torpedo boats and submarines, that are later also acquired.

In 1882, the Portuguese Navy received its first torpedo boat and, in 1884, it received the corvette Afonso de Albuquerque, its first unprotected cruiser.

In 1889, Naval Lieutenant João Augusto Fontes Pereira de Melo presented the project of a "submarine station". A model of the so-called submarine Fontes was tested in the Naval Arsenal of Lisbon.

At the end of the 19th century, the Portuguese Navy had the conscience that it did not possess a capable force to defend the Portuguese European waters and ports against a possible enemy aggression. Portuguese naval theorists started to defend the use of the submarine as the only weapon capable of facing a more powerful enemy navy.

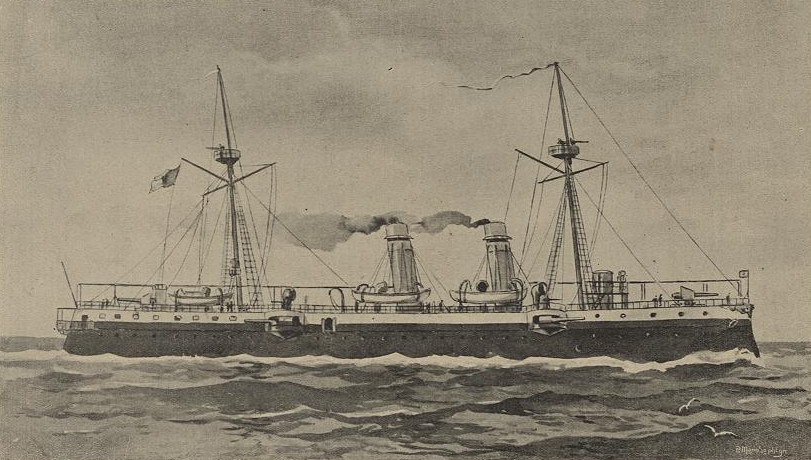
Rainha Dona Amélia, one of the cruisers of the 1896 naval program, built in the Lisbon Naval Arsenal

In 1896, an emergency naval program proposed by the Navy Minister Jacinto Cândido da Silva was approved. This included the construction of four protected cruisers, which replaced the mixed propulsion corvettes as the primary ships of the fleet. A fifth cruiser was also ordered in the scope of a public subscription organized as a response to the 1890 British Ultimatum. In 1901, the old ironclad Vasco da Gama suffered a major refurbish, being transformed into an armored cruiser and, in 1907, the first submarine was ordered.

From the end of the 19th century until the beginning of the 20th century, the Portuguese Navy participated in a series of colonial pacification campaigns, aimed to neutralize local uprisings and to enforce Portuguese sovereignty in Angola, in Mozambique, in the Portuguese Guinea and in other overseas territories. Most of these campaigns were the responsibility of the Army, but the Navy actively supported them, including leading some of the operations. For these campaigns, the Portuguese Navy organized a brown-water navy mostly made up of river gunboats that operated in the African rivers in support of the ground forces. The Navy also organized expeditionary naval infantry units that operated in Africa as landing forces in support of the Army units.

The Báruè Campaign, in 1902, stood out as an example of a colonial campaign led by the Navy and where important naval assets were employed. The campaign was aimed to pacify the Báruè, a hinterland region of central Mozambique, crossed by the Pungwe River. The operations were under the overall command of Lieutenant-Commander João Coutinho. They included the initial maritime movement of troops by the cruisers São Gabriel and São Rafael and the gunships Chaimite and Liberal, from several areas in Mozambique and its concentration in the area of operations. The operations in the Pungwe River were conducted by the gunboats of the Zambezi Flotilla, reinforced with chartered merchant vessels. The landing forces included Army artillery and infantry troops, Colonial native units and naval infantry forces constituted by sailors detached from the crews of the ships of the Mozambique Naval Station.

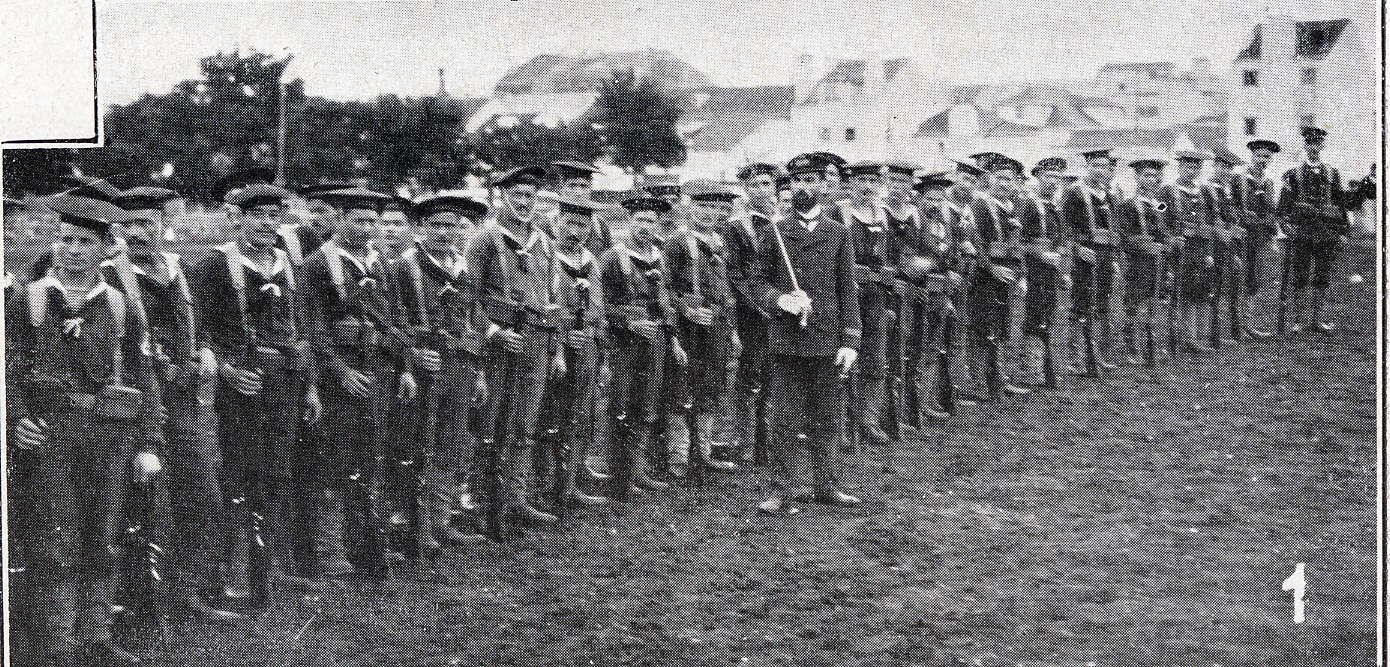
Expeditionary force of naval infantry preparing to embark to Angola in 1907

In the beginning of the 20th century, the Portuguese Naval League started to study a program of reforms and equipment to apply to the Portuguese Navy. These studies were mainly led by young naval officers from which stood out Lieutenant Álvaro Nunes Ribeiro and Lieutenant Fernando Pereira da Silva.

The modernization of the Portuguese Navy in the last years of the Monarchy meant that in 1910, it had sophisticated ships, already equipped with electric energy, wireless communications, torpedoes and modern artillery. The fleet included six cruisers, four torpedo boats, a torpedo gunboat, thirteen gunships and other auxiliary and minor vessels, with a submarine under construction. Nonetheless, owing to financial problems as a result of mismanagement and failure to develop its African possessions, Portugal was unable to maintain a larger fleet.

On 10 October 1910, the monarchy was deposed and replaced by the Portuguese First Republic. The new political regime presented an ambitious naval program, that foresaw the building of three powerful dreadnought battleships, three cruisers, 12 destroyers and six submarines. Although approved by the parliament in 1912, the program comes to almost nothing, mostly due to the lack of funding. On the contrary, during the First Republic, the Navy entered a period of neglect, gradually losing part of its capabilities, in a process that culminated in a situation that would be referred in the late 1920s as an almost "naval zero".

=== World War I ===
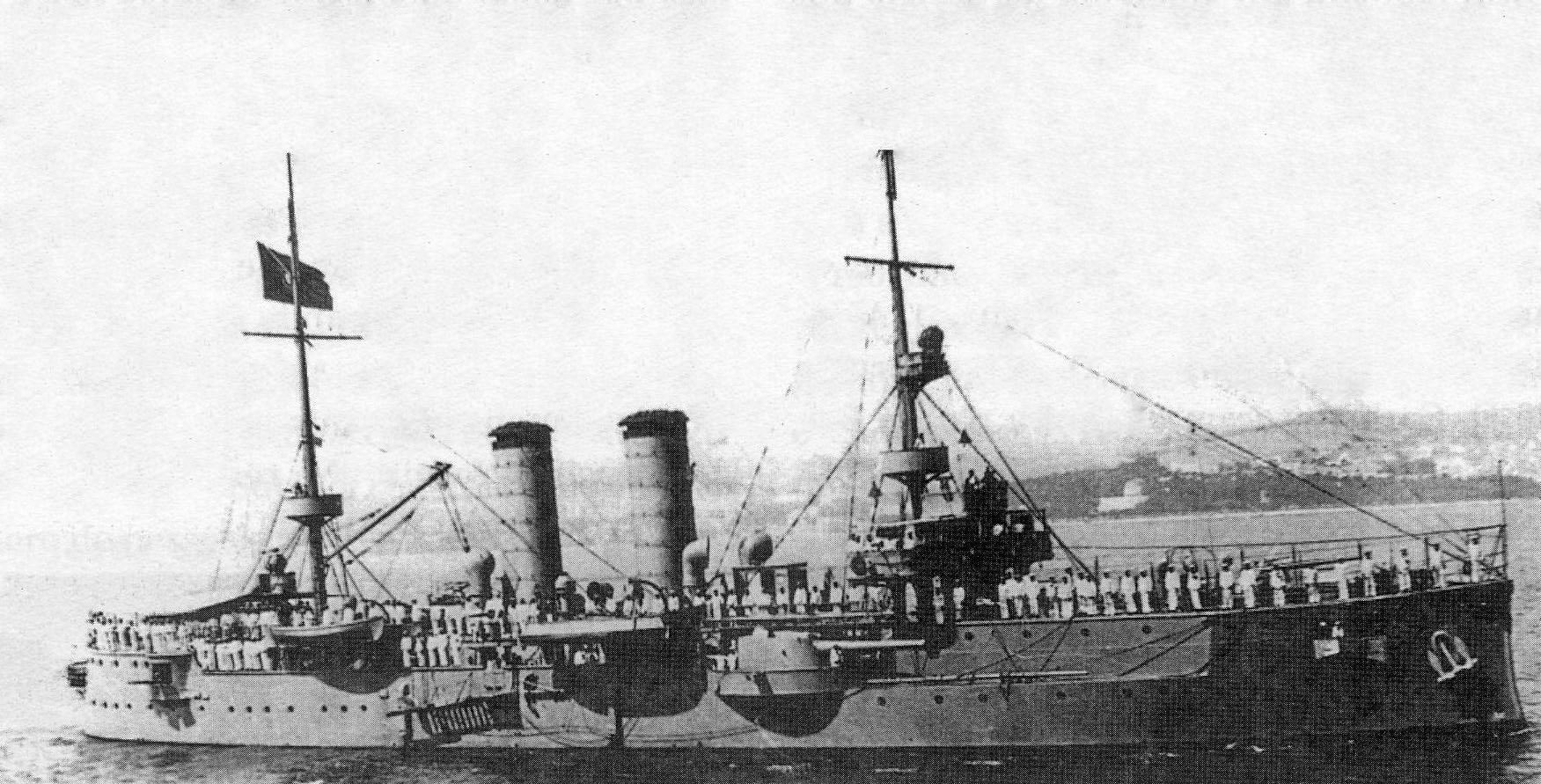
NRP Vasco da Gama, in the early 20th century

The conflict between Portugal and Germany started before the formal declaration of war between the two countries, when several military clashes occurred in the borders between Angola and German West Africa and between Mozambique and German East Africa, in the middle of 1914. In August 1914, a German surprise attack against the isolated border post of Mazúia in the Rovuma riverbank in Northern Mozambique, resulted in the massacre of the small garrison, including its commander, the Navy sergeant Eduardo Rodrigues da Costa, who become the first Portuguese killed in action during the World War I. Another of these surprise attacks occurred against the post of Cuangar in southern Angola in October, also resulting in the massacre of most of the Portuguese garrison, machine-gunned by the attacking German forces. As part of the Portuguese military reinforcements sent to respond to the German aggressions, a naval infantry expeditionary battalion was sent to Angola in November 1914, participating in the South-West Africa Campaign land fighting, under the command of Lieutenant-Commander Afonso Cerqueira.

On 23 February 1916, in an operation led by Commander Leote do Rego from the cruiser Vasco da Gama, the Portuguese Navy captured 38 German ships anchored in the Lisbon harbor. Other ships are captured in the Portuguese harbors of Mainland Portugal (Porto and Setubal), the Azores (Horta and Ponta Delgada), Madeira (Funchal), Cape Verde (São Vicente), Angola (Luanda), Mozambique (Mozambique Island, Beira and Lourenço Marques) and Portuguese India (Mormugão), in a total of 72 German and Austro-Hungarian vessels. This is followed by the German declaration of war to Portugal on 9 March, marking the formal Portuguese entrance in World War I.

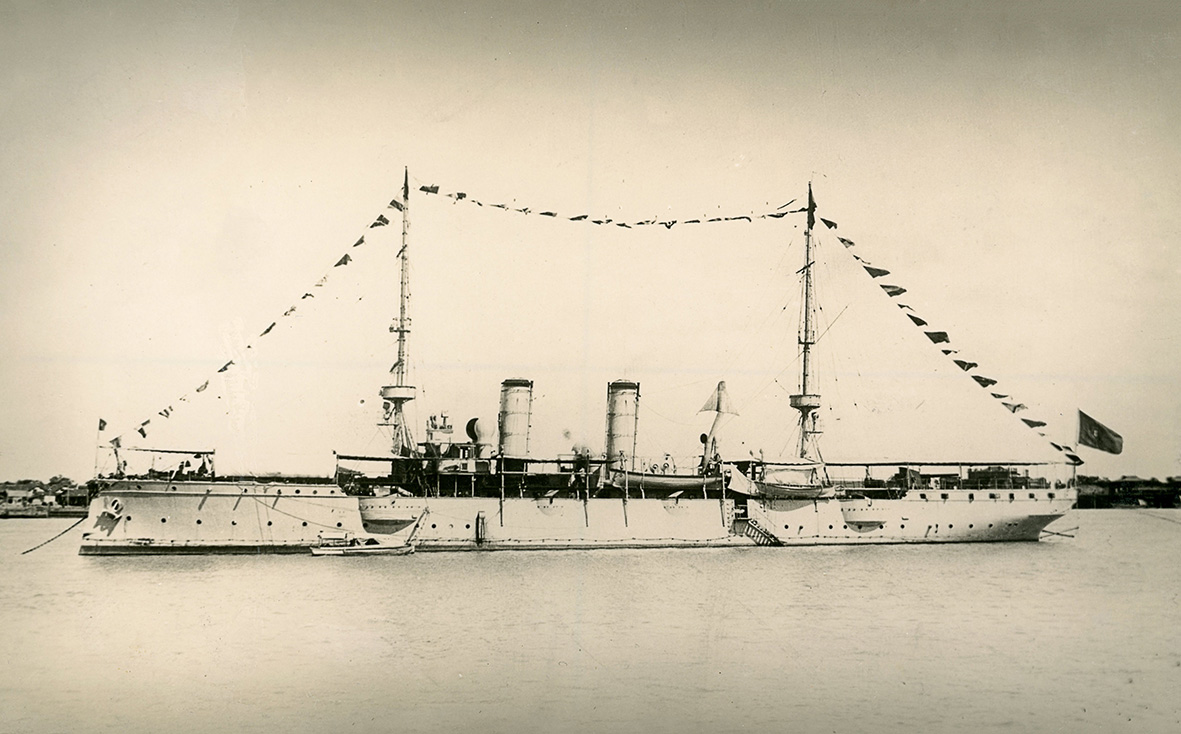
The Portuguese cruiser Adamastor

In the beginning of the World War I, the Portuguese fleet included five cruisers, one aviso (sloop-of-war), one destroyer, one submarine, 12 gunships, seven river gunboats, four torpedo boats, two training ships and other seven armed vessels. During the war, two additional destroyers, three submarines and three gunships would be received. A number of liners, cargo ships, trawlers and tugs would be mobilized and fitted for naval service, these including three auxiliary cruisers, one hospital ship, four transport ships and more than 20 naval trawlers (patrol boats and minehunters). The Portuguese Naval Aviation as well as its Lisbon Naval Air Station would be created in 1917, receiving more than 25 seaplanes during the wartime.

From February 1916, the Portuguese naval forces operating in Mozambique included the cruiser Adamastor and the gunship Chaimite, besides several river gunboats and other small vessels of the Zambezi Flotilla. During May 1916, Adamastor and Chaimite led an operation against the German forces in the mouth of the Rovuma River, bombarding the enemy positions and launching landing parties that took the German fortifications of the Namaca island. An amphibious assault against the northern bank of the river was however repulsed by well entrenched German forces, with intense machine-gun fire that caused a high number of casualties in the Portuguese landing parties. The northern bank of the Rovuma would finally be occupied by the Portuguese forces three months later. The cruiser São Gabriel was also sent to Mozambique in April 1918, incidentally detecting and engaging a U-boat, while en route. When it was anchored in Cape Town, South Africa, São Gabriel was requested to collaborate in the security of the city, that was under the threat of an uprising and only guarded by 50 police officers, disembarking 116 of the members of its crew, that assumed the defense of the port for four days, until the return of the British naval forces that had left for the sea.

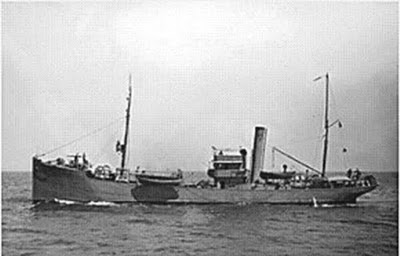
NRP Augusto de Castilho, leading figure of the action of 14 October 1918 in the North Atlantic

One of the main roles of the Portuguese Navy was to defend the ports of Mainland Portugal and of the Portuguese North Atlantic isles (the Azores, Madeira and Cape Verde), specially against naval mines and U-boat attacks. The main effort was made on the defense of the Lisbon harbor, the principal Portuguese seaport and naval base, with intense naval patrolling done by surface vessels, submarines and naval aircraft, naval surveillance from land stations and the launching of antisubmarine mines and net barrages. The Navy also manned some of the coastal defense artillery batteries. In the defense operations of the Lisbon harbor, the Navy lost the minehunter Roberto Ivens, that hit an enemy mine, sinking with the death of all its crew, and a FBA seaplane, that disappeared with its crew while patrolling off the bar of the Tagus estuary.

Another port that received much attention from the Portuguese Navy was that of São Vicente, in the Cape Verde isles. São Vicente was the interface of the telegraph submarine cables that connected America, Europe and Africa, as well being a major coaling station for the Allied warships and merchant vessels that navigated in the Atlantic. In 1914, the Navy dispatched a naval infantry force and the gunships Beira and Ibo for the islands. Later, these forces were reinforced with the gunship Bengo, with antisubmarine barrages and with coastal batteries operated by the Navy. From 1916 to 1918, the Portuguese naval forces in Cape Verde were able to successfully repulse several U-boat attacks against ships anchored in the São Vicente harbor.

Important efforts were also made in the defense of the harbors of Leixões, Horta, Ponta Delgada, Funchal and coast of the Algarve, with engagements occurring when Ponta Delgada and Funchal were attacked and bombarded by U-boats. The Portuguese Navy also supported the naval base and air station operated by the United States Navy in Ponta Delgada and the naval air station operated by the French Naval Aviation in São Jacinto, Aveiro. A Portuguese naval air detachment was deployed to Horta, Azores and a naval air station was built in the Culatra Island, Algarve, although never activated because the War meanwhile ended.

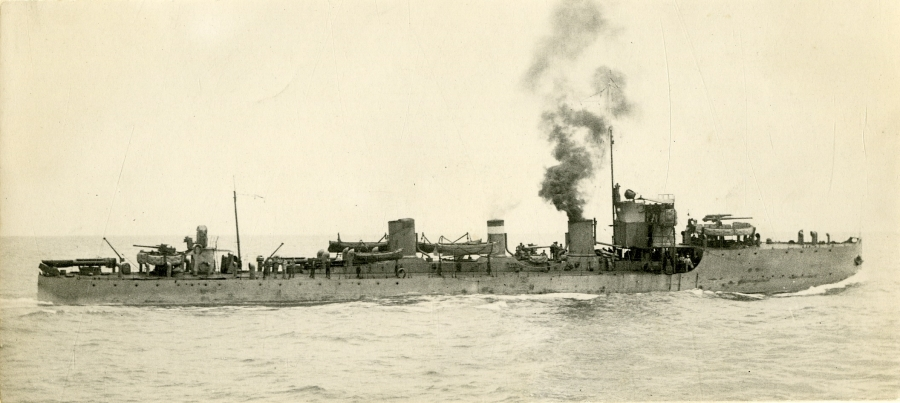
NRP Guadiana, a Douro-class destroyer employed in the defense of the Lisbon harbor

The Portuguese Navy operated in the North Atlantic, escorting merchant vessels and protecting the maritime communication lines between the Mainland and the Portuguese Atlantic isles. In one of these missions, occurred the famous Action of 14 October 1918, between the naval trawler Augusto de Castilho, under the command of Lieutenant Carvalho Araújo, and the German U-boat cruiser SM U-139. U-139 attacked the Portuguese liner SS San Miguel, that was navigating from Funchal to Ponta Delgada, with 209 passengers on board, under the escort of Augusto de Castilho. Despite being a small boat only armed with a 65 mm and a 47 mm guns, Augusto de Castilho engaged U-139 (armed with torpedoes and two 150 mm deck guns), successfully covering the escape of San Miguel. After being able to sustain a disproportionate combat for several hours, Augusto de Castilho was destroyed and sunk, with the death of its captain and several other crew members.

Another wartime mission for the Navy was the transportation and the convoying of the Portuguese expeditionary troops sent to fight in the European Western Front and in the Southern African campaigns. More than 56,000 men of the Portuguese Expeditionary Corps and of the Portuguese Independent Heavy Artillery Corps were transported to France, more than 15,000 men to Angola and more than 17,000 to Mozambique. Smaller military contingents were also transported to other Portuguese island and overseas territories.

The Portuguese Merchant Marine also made a major contribution for the war effort of Portugal, either with their vessels and personnel mobilized to serve as part of the Portuguese Navy, either by their own, transporting troops and supplies under the constant danger of U-boat, naval mine and merchant raider attacks. From 1916 to 1918, 115 Portuguese merchant ships were sunk by U-boats, with the loss of 120 members of their crews.

=== Interwar period ===
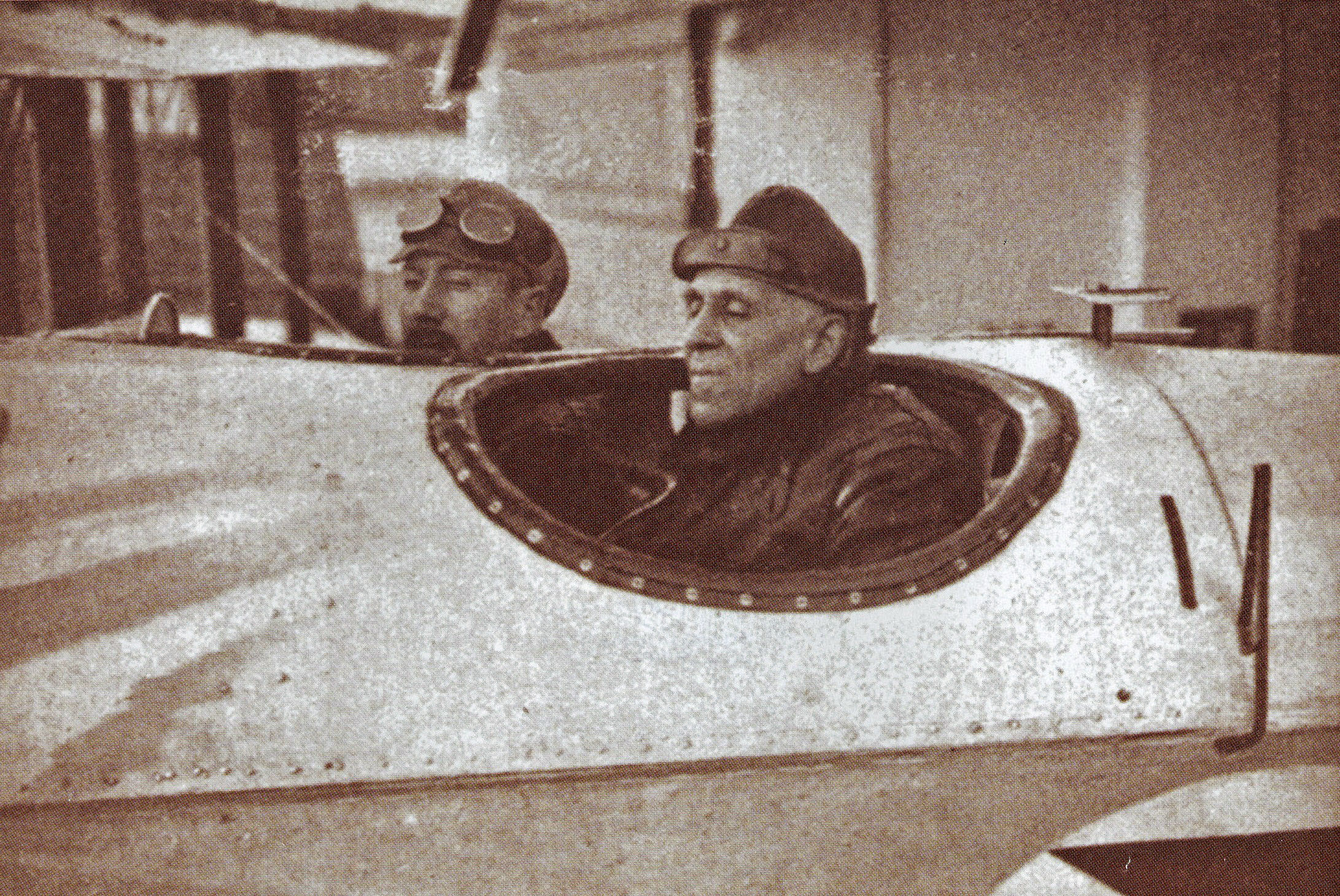
Lieutenant-Commander Sacadura Cabral and Captain Gago Coutinho in the cockpit of the Fairey III seaplane Lusitânia, at the departure for the first aerial crossing of the South Atlantic

After the end of World War I, Portugal continued the Douro-class destroyer and the Beira-class gunship programs, building two additional units of the previous and three units of the latter. As a war compensation, the Portuguese Navy received six Austrian-Hungarian Tb 82 F-class torpedo boats, with only four of these being commissioned. The Navy also acquired two British Arabis-class sloops, that were commissioned as cruisers.

In 1922, the Portuguese naval officers Sacadura Cabral and Gago Coutinho made the first aerial crossing of the South Atlantic. They left the Lisbon Naval Air Station in Bom Sucesso, on 30 March, in a Fairey III-D MkII seaplane of the Navy, specifically outfitted for the journey. The aircraft was equipped with an artificial horizon for aeronautical use, a revolutionary own invention of Gago Coutinho. They arrived on the Brazilian Saint Peter and Saint Paul Archipelago on 17 April and ended the journey in Rio de Janeiro on the June, 17.

The Interwar period sees the start of the construction of a new naval base and a large arsenal at the Alfeite, in the southern bank of the Tagus estuary. The facilities at the Alfeite were intended replace the Lisbon Navy Arsenal and the several small stations dispersed throughout Lisbon and the Tagus estuary, that together constituted the Lisbon Naval Base, concentrating them in a single place. The plans for the new Naval Base facilities also foresee the transference of the Lisbon Naval Air Station, from the Bom Sucesso docks to a new air base to be built at Montijo. The first naval facilities at the Alfeite were finished in 1924, with the Naval School being transferred to there in 1936 and the Alfeite Arsenal being finished in 1937. The construction of the new facilities would continue gradually until the 1950s.

Due to the frequent piracy attacks and the civil conflicts affecting China, in 1927 the Portuguese Navy reinforced its station at Macau, with the cruisers República and Adamastor, that joined the gunships Macau and Pátria already based there. As part of the Portuguese naval forces in Macau, a naval air station was created at Taipa island, operating Fairey III seaplanes. In 1937, the Chinese Civil War and the Japanese invasion, would lead the Portuguese Navy to reinforce again the naval forces in Macau, this time with sloops in rotation. The Macau Naval Air Station would be reactivated with Hawker Osprey seaplanes.

On the early morning of 4 April 1931, several officers of the Madeira garrison, that opposed the National Dictatorship Government, revolted. As part of this movement, military uprisings are also planned for other parts of the Portuguese territory, but they either fail to occur or are quickly dominated by forces loyal to the Government. However, in Madeira, the rebels have the support of part of the population and of several exiled opposition politicians, managing to prevail and control the island. Under the threat of a possible intervention from foreign powers that send warships to the area and the threat from the Portuguese opposition politicians that suggested the creation of a separate "Republic of the Atlantic", the Government finds itself under pressure to quickly dominate the rebellion.

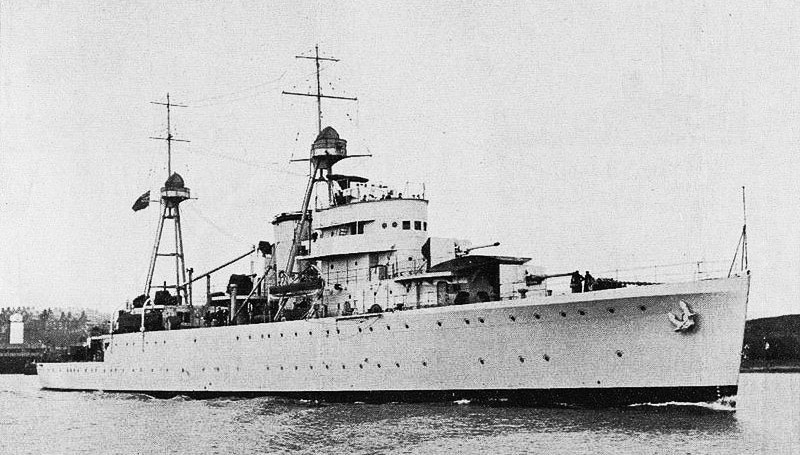
NRP Afonso de Albuquerque, one of the ships of the Portuguese Naval Program of the 1930s

This could only be accomplished by conducting an amphibious operation to retake the island, but this showed difficult to execute without a properly equipped Navy that had been neglected for years and was in a state of almost "naval zero". Under the leadership of the Navy Minister Magalhães Correia, the Portuguese Navy will, however, demonstrate great ability to improvise, mobilizing a flotilla of merchant and fishing vessels, that are urgently fitted for naval service. This flotilla includes the seaplane carrier Cubango (a cargo ship transformed in the only aircraft carrier ever operated by the Portuguese Navy), two auxiliary cruisers, two transport ships and four naval trawlers, that join the cruiser Vasco da Gama, a destroyer and three gunships, to constitute the naval forces organized to retake Madeira. These forces carried on board four CAMS 37 flying boats and an Army landing force. The naval expedition leaves Lisbon on 24 April, with the landing operations starting on 26 April. The air support, provided by the Naval Aviation flying boats operating from the Cubango, was crucial for the success of the landings and the advance of the Government forces inside the island. After several days of combat, on 2 May 1931, the rebels cease the resistance.

The rebellion in Madeira made it more clear that an Atlantic country like Portugal, with islands and overseas territories, could not survive without a capable and adequately equipped Navy. An important investment in the Portuguese Navy was authorized by the Government, with Minister Magalhães Correia launching a new naval program, partially based in early plans conceived by Admiral Pereira da Silva. The naval program foresee the existence of a European naval force for Atlantic control centered in destroyers and an overseas naval force for colonial service centered in avisos (sloops). These forces would be supported by a surface strike force of two cruisers, a seaplane carrier, naval aircraft, submarines and support vessels. Although only half of the program was executed, from 1933 to 1939, the Portuguese Navy acquired a total of 22 new warships, including state-of-the-art Vouga-class destroyers, Delfim-class submarines and Afonso de Albuquerque-class, Gonçalo Velho-class and Pedro Nunes-class avisos. The cruisers ended by not to be built and the seaplane carrier started to be built, but was later cancelled and replaced by other additional ships.

=== World War II ===
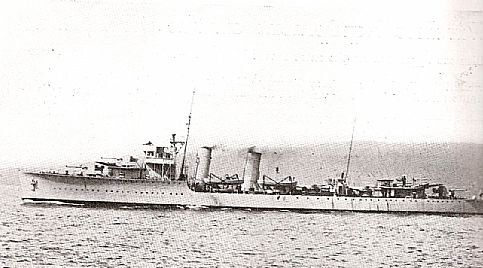
NRP Vouga, lead ship of the Vouga-class destroyers employed in the defense of the Portuguese sea lines of communications during World War II

Portugal remained a neutral country during World War II, but its Government would later assume a neutral collaborating attitude toward the Allied powers. The Navy contributed for the defense of the Portuguese neutrality at sea and air. In the beginning of the war, the Portuguese Navy included six destroyers, seven avisos, three submarines, three torpedo boats, five gunships, two river gunboats, three patrol boats, two mine warfare vessels, four survey vessels, two support vessels and two training ships. Naval Aviation included around 40 aircraft, mainly seaplanes operating from the naval air stations of Lisbon, Aveiro and Macau and from the avisos of the Afonso de Albuquerque class.

To avoid being confused with ships from belligerent countries, the Portuguese merchant vessels started to navigate with large flags of Portugal and their names painted on the sides of the hull. However, this did not completely prevent some submarine attacks against Portuguese ships. The most serious attack would occur in 1942, when the three-masted lugger sailing ship Maria da Glória, navigating en route to Greenland, was attacked and sunk by the German submarine U-94, with the death of 36 of her 44 crew.

A particular concern was the defense of the strategic Atlantic islands of the Azores against a possible invasion. In 1941, islands began to be strongly reinforced with ground and air forces, with a garrison of 32,500 troops and more than 60 aircraft. The Portuguese Navy focused in the defense of the waters and ports of the Azores with patrol boats and destroyers deployed on rotation. These surface forces were supported by Fleet 10, Avro 626, Grumman G-21 and Grumman G-44 seaplanes that patrolled the waters from the reactivated Azores Naval Air Station at Ponta Delgada. In a smaller scale, similar reinforcements were also sent to Madeira and to Cape Verde islands. Although both the Axis and the Allied powers had plans to invade the islands and use them to control the Atlantic (including the planned British operations Alloy, Shrapnell, Brisk, Thruster, Springboard and Lifebelt, the US Operation Grey and the German operations Felix, Ilona and Isabella), the Portuguese military reinforcements were able to support Portuguese diplomacy in successfully deterring any attempt at performing that invasion.

The Navy also had to plan a possible strategic evacuation of the Portuguese Government to the Azores. This evacuation was planned to occur in the case of an enemy invasion and successfully occupation of Continental Portugal. The risk of this invasion happening was considered high and plans for it were in fact included in the German preparations for the planned operations Isabella and Felix.

An effort was also made to defend the Portuguese overseas territories in Africa, Asia and Oceania. Although the naval and military assets were always few for such large number of territories, it was still possible to maintain the integrity of the great majority of them. The major exception being Portuguese Timor, which was occupied by Australian and Dutch forces in December 1941, allegedly to defend it against a possible Japanese invasion. After protests from the Portuguese Government, an agreement was reached in which the Allied forces would withdraw from the Portuguese territory after the arrival of the Portuguese military reinforcements that were sent from Mozambique on board the aviso Gonçalves Zarco and the transport ship João Belo. In February 1942, when the Portuguese reinforcements were still en route, the Japanese used the pretext of the Australian and Dutch invasion to invade Portuguese Timor, catching the Allied forces by surprise and forcing them to withdraw to the mountains. This evolved into the Battle of Timor, fought from 1942 to 1945.

In 1943, following an evocation of the Anglo-Portuguese Treaty of 1373 by the British Government, Portugal ceded air facilities to the Royal Air Force in the Terceira Island, Azores. Latter, similar facilities were also ceded to the United States in Santa Maria Island. The facilities in the Azores would be crucial for the Allied victory in the Battle of the Atlantic and its global Victory in Europe. However, this Portuguese collaboration with the Allies increased the threat of a possible aggression from the Axis, forcing the Portuguese Navy to increase its efforts to deter any possible naval attack against Continental Portugal, the Azores and the other Portuguese islands in the North Atlantic.

To address the need to defend the coast and the harbors of the Atlantic islands and Continental Portugal, the Portuguese fleet was reinforced with about 30 patrol boats and mine hunters, including newly built vessels and naval trawlers adapted from fishing vessels. Additionally, a number of naval trawlers were built in Portugal and transferred to the Royal Navy to aid the British war effort. The Navy built and commissioned a survey ship and the tanker Sam Brás, with this one being critical to ensure the wartime supply of fuel to Portugal. Naval Aviation was greatly reinforced, receiving more than 100 new aircraft and activating a naval strike unit equipped with land based Bristol Blenheim torpedo bombers, later replaced by Bristol Beaufighters.

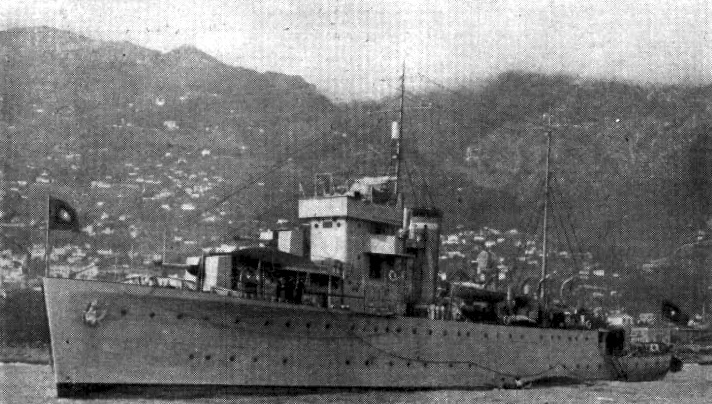
NRP Gonçalves Zarco, one of the ships that took part in the reoccupation of Portuguese Timor, invaded by the Japanese

Besides the purely military missions, during the conflict, the Portuguese Navy performed a number of humanitarian missions, that included many maritime search and rescue operations. In this operations, it was able to save thousands of lives of survivors from vessels and aircraft sunk near the Portuguese waters. These included both warships and merchant vessels, from the Allies, the Axis and the Neutral countries. In one of these operations in January 1943, when returning to Ponta Delgada, after rescuing 119 survivors of the US merchant ships City of Fint and Julia Ward Howe sunk by German U-boats, the destroyer Lima, under the command of Lieutenant-Commander Sarmento Rodrigues, suffered a failure of her engines for 45 minutes. In a middle of a heavy storm, without engines and suffering the strong impact of the huge waves of the North Atlantic, the ship tilted 67°, the highest slope of a ship without sinking ever registered in the history of navigation.

In January 1945, aircraft from the carrier USS Enterprise bombarded the Macau Naval Air Station, destroying its facilities and aircraft. This never well explained attack was done, allegedly, because United States forces were mistakenly thinking that Macau had been occupied by the Japanese.

After the cession of hostilities in 1945, the Portuguese Navy organized an expedition to Timor to reoccupy the territory and to restore Portuguese sovereignty. The naval component of the expedition included the avisos Bartolomeu Dias, Gonçalves Zarco and Afonso de Albuquerque and the transport ships Angola, Sofala and Quanza, carrying supplies and about 2,000 troops.

=== Early Cold War ===
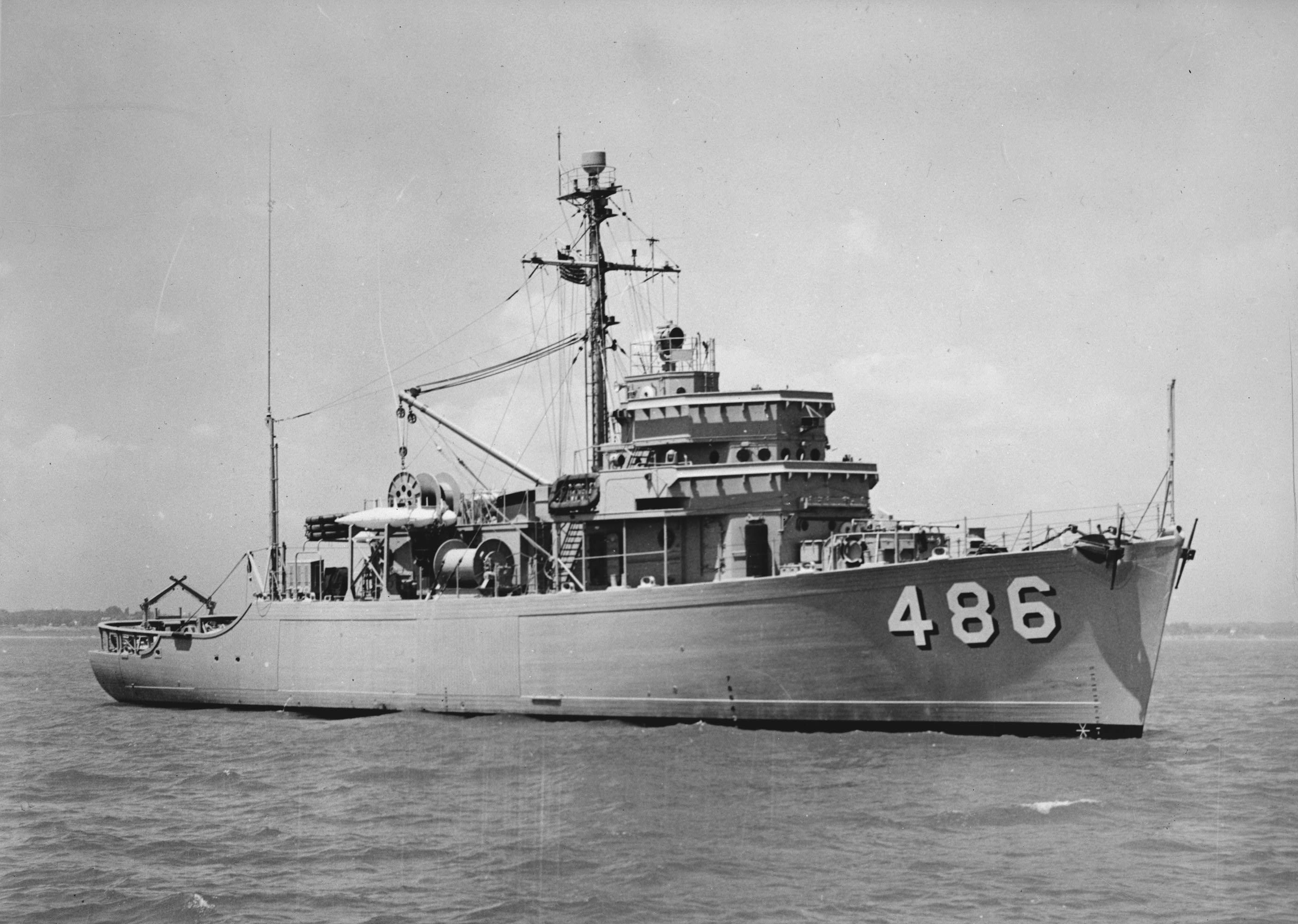
The minesweeper NRP Graciosa, in trials, just before being delivered to the Portuguese Navy in 1955

After World War II, Portugal was one of the founding nations of NATO. In the scope of the Cold War, the Portuguese fleet participated in the defense of the North Atlantic against the Soviet naval threat. Inside NATO, the Portuguese Navy stands out by the development of a high proficiency in the mine and anti-submarine warfare.

Besides the already existing ships that suffered modernization programs, the Portuguese Navy started to receive a series of new ships from the late 1940s, including nine frigates, three submarines, 14 patrol ships and 15 mine warfare ships. The Naval Aviation also received new aircraft, including 24 Curtiss SB2C Helldiver dive bombers that formed an anti-submarine squadron, considered a case study of efficiency among NATO, initially based at the Aveiro Naval Air Station and then transferred to the new Montijo Naval Air Base.

The roles of Minister of National Defence and Chief of the General Staff of the Armed Forces were created in 1950, uniting the Navy and the Army under a joint command and marking the creation of the Portuguese Armed Forces as an integrated force.

After an intense debate and fierce opposition from the naval aviators, in 1952, the Government took the controversial decision to place the Naval Aviation under the control of the then-created independent Portuguese Air Force, as the semi-autonomous Naval Air Forces. The Naval Air Forces would be fully integrated in the Air Force in 1958, effectively ceasing to exist as a separate branch, with many of the naval aviators and other personnel opting to return to the Portuguese Navy.

In the early 1960s, the Portuguese fleet included 16 ocean escorts (including destroyers, frigates and avisos), three submarines, 23 patrol vessels, 19 mine warfare vessels (including ocean mine-sweepers, coastal mine-sweepers and mine-hunters), four survey vessels, one tanker, one buoy tender and one training ship.

From the late 1950s, the Portuguese Government and Military began to be concerned about the increasing external and internal threats against the overseas territories of Portugal and the consequent need to defend them, including with adequate naval forces. While the "European" navy was equipped mainly with anti-submarine frigates, submarines and mine warfare vessels to operate in the North Atlantic in the scope of NATO, a new "Overseas" navy started to be planned. Initially, the planned Overseas navy was conceived as a mobile intervention force, centered on light aircraft carriers carrying Marine assault forces. However, this concept was not considered the most adequate and soon evolved into the concept of a force centered on frigates and corvettes capable of carrying and supporting small landing forces, as well as on patrol ships. The beginning of the separatist guerrillas in the early 1960s and the consequent need of operating in the rivers and lakes of Portuguese Africa would force the evolution of the Overseas navy concept, with the creation of brown-water forces equipped with a high number of small patrol and landing craft.

In parallel to developing its fleet, the Portuguese Navy started to expand its worldwide capacity of command, control and logistics in order to cover all Portuguese Overseas territories and respective waters. From 1957, naval commands were created in Cape Verde, in Angola, in Mozambique and in Goa (Portuguese India), besides those established in the Continent and in the Azores. Each naval command was responsible for an oceanic area of operations, in a way that most of the North Atlantic, the South Atlantic and the Indian Ocean were contiguously covered by Portuguese oceanic areas. Subordinated to the naval commands, a number of local maritime defense commands and naval support facilities were also created. The Portuguese Navy also developed a worldwide communications network, with naval radio stations being established in all Portuguese Overseas territories. This network gave the Navy full responsibility for providing the long range inter-territorial radio communications service to all branches of the Portuguese Armed Forces.

=== The Overseas wars ===
After half a century, the Portuguese Navy was in combat again during the second half of the 20th century. This combat took place in the Indian Ocean against the Indian Union and in Africa against the independence movements of the Portuguese territories.

On the morning of 17 December 1961, the Indian Armed Forces launched a massive attack against Portuguese India, invading the territories of Goa, Daman and Diu with overwhelming land, air and naval forces. The Indian naval forces attacking Goa included an aircraft carrier, two cruisers, eight frigates and five other ships. The Portuguese naval forces comprised only three small patrol boats, one each in Goa, Daman and Diu, and the old aviso NRP Afonso de Albuquerque, based in Goa. Besides its mission of facing the enemy naval units, Afonso de Albuquerque was also tasked with serving as coastal battery for the defense of the Mormugao harbour, as well as providing vital radio communications with Lisbon after on-shore radio facilities had been destroyed in Indian air-strikes.

Afonso de Albuquerque engaged in the last conventional battle fought by the Portuguese Navy to the present day, when, at the 12h00 of 18 December, several Indian frigates entered Mormugao harbour and opened fire. In response, Afonso de Albuquerque lifted anchor, headed out towards the enemy and returned fire with its 120 mm guns. For about an hour, Afonso de Albuquerque was able to sustain a disadvantageous battle with the Indian ships, firing nearly 400 rounds and hitting two of the enemy vessels. Finally, after having suffered severe damage from the enemy fire, with five of the crew killed and 13 injured (including its captain), the ship was stranded and later evacuated by the crew under heavy bombardment.

The patrol boat NRP Vega also engaged in combat, first defying the attacking Indian cruiser Delhi and then opening fire with its 20 mm gun against the enemy aircraft that were striking Diu, including an Indian Vampire jet fighter. In retaliation, the enemy aircraft focused the attack on the Vega, which was finally destroyed and sunk, with two members of the crew (including its captain) killed and other three injured.

During the Overseas wars fought in Africa (1961–1975), the Portuguese Navy played a fundamental role in combat, patrol and amphibious missions in the ocean and inland waters of Angola, Portuguese Guinea and Mozambique. In amphibious missions the action of the Portuguese Marines was fundamental. Two types of Marine units were created, the Special Marines (fuzileiros especiais) specialized in offensive operations and the Marines (fuzileiros) for the defense of naval assets. The Portuguese Navy had to equip itself with a large fleet of small units including patrol boats and landing craft, many of them designed and built in Portugal.

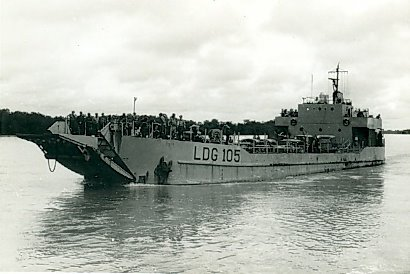
The landing craft NRP Bombarda preparing to land troops in Xime, eastern Portuguese Guinea, in 1969

In the Angolan theater, the main focus of the Portuguese Navy effort was the protection of the Zaire River, to avoid the infiltration of UPA/FNLA and MPLA guerrillas from the bordering Congo-Léopoldville (later known as Congo-Kinshasa and then Zaire). This mission was done by the patrol and landing crafts of the Zaire Flotilla, occasionally supported by frigates, and by units of Marines using rubber boats. The interdiction of the Zaire River was so successful that the Portuguese was able to stop the infiltration of the guerrillas, allowing the Portuguese Forces to defeat and almost totality eliminate them from Northern Angola, virtually terminating the war in the region in the early 1970s. The defeat and elimination of the guerrillas in Northern Angola, led the independence movements to re-orientate their activity to the vast, remote and almost desert areas of Eastern Angola in the late 1960s, benefiting from support and bases in the neighboring Zambia. To respond to this move, the Navy also started to focus in Eastern Angola, establishing naval and Marine units at more than 1,000 km (620 mi) from the sea coast. These operated in the Zambezi, Cuando, Cuanza and other local rivers, against the MPLA and UNITA guerrillas that were active in the area. In the end of 1968, the Command of the Navy Forces in the East was established in a base located in a region known as the Terras do Fim do Mundo (the Lands of the End of the World), that gave origin to a small town named Vila Nova da Armada (New Town of the Navy).

From 1970, the Portuguese naval presence in Angola stabilized, including one frigate in rotation, four patrol ships, 11 patrol motor launches, 15 landing crafts, two Special Marine detachments, four Marine companies and five detachments of the Navy Forces in the East.

Due to the geographical and hydrological characteristics of the Portuguese Guinea, it was in this theater of operations that the Navy could give a proportionately higher contribution to the Portuguese war effort. Guinea is crossed by a multitude of water streams, many of them navigable rivers, and a large part of its territory is marshy and flooded. This conditions allowed the Portuguese Navy to intervene in virtually all the territory, including in its hinterland regions. By the other side, in this theater, the Portuguese forces faced the PAIGC, probably the best organized, trained and equipped of the independence movements, that from a certain point, managed to obtain a combat potential often equivalent or even superior to that of the Portuguese, which led to the conflict take on many characteristics of a conventional and no longer a mere guerrilla warfare.

The PAIGC was even able to create its own Navy, equipped with some Eastern Bloc and Chinese naval assets, including modern P 6-class torpedo boats that constituted an additional threat to be faced by the Portuguese naval forces. Besides this, the PAIGC benefited from the support of the neighboring countries of Senegal and specially, of the Republic of Guinea. Given the relatively small land area of the Portuguese Guinea, the sanctuaries offered by those countries allowed PAIGC forces to be able to launch direct attacks against the Portuguese garrisons from their bases in those countries and quickly withdraw to the other side of the border before being hit by the Portuguese counter-strikes. In this theater, the Portuguese Navy played the most varied missions, including most of the logistical support to the Portuguese military units scattered throughout the territory, fire support to the land forces, amphibious assaults with Marine units and the interdiction of the water supply lines used by the PAIGC.

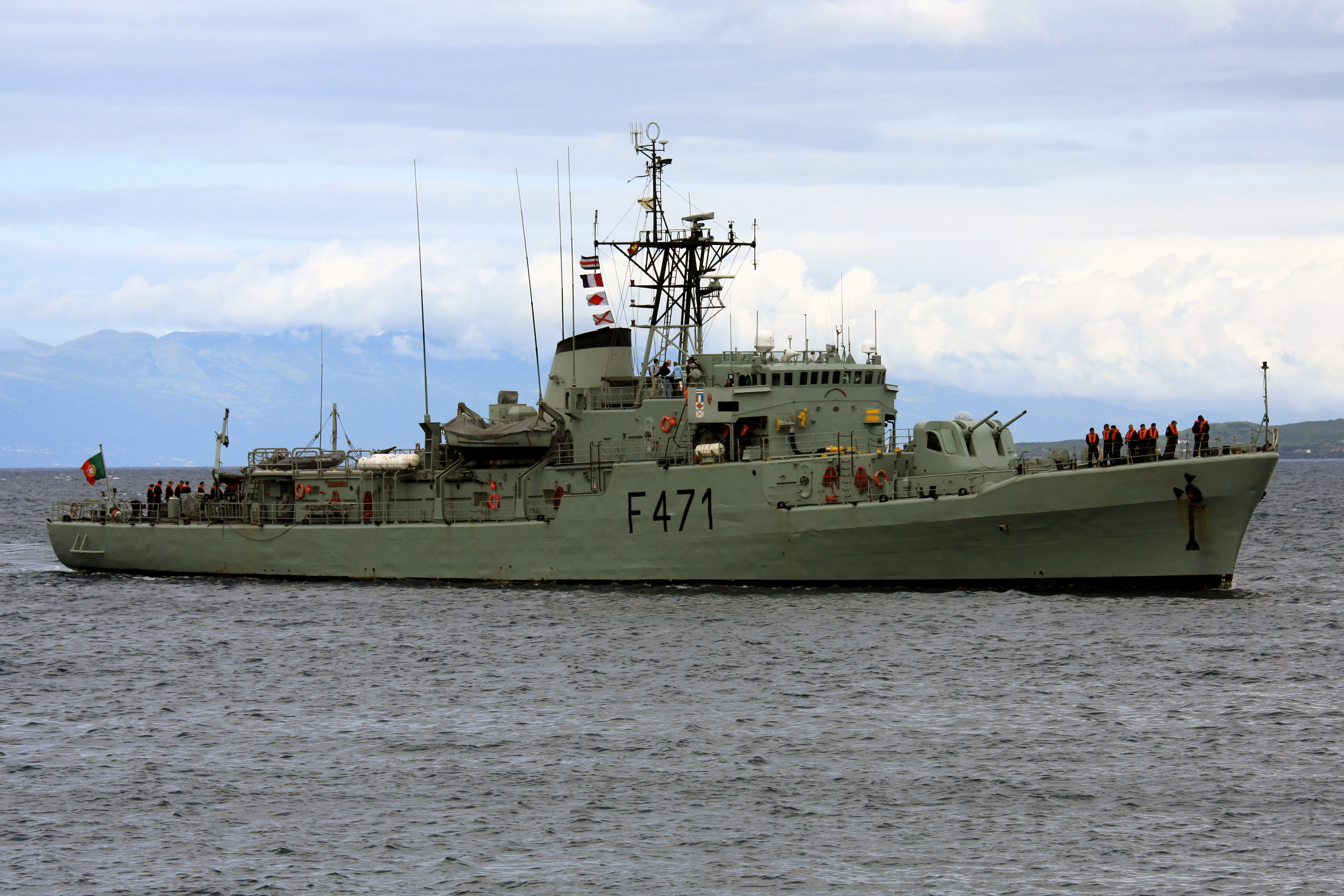
NRP António Enes, a Portuguese-designed Overseas War era João Coutinho-class corvette

The Portuguese naval presence in Guinea, from 1964, included a frigate, seven patrol boats, 15 landing craft, four Special Marine detachments and two Marine companies. Latter, additional landing craft and a Sapper Divers unit would be added, this latter to face the use of naval mines by the PAIGC forces. In 1971, in the scope of the "Africanization" policy of General Spínola, two African Special Marines detachments were created, staffed with personnel recruited locally in the Portuguese Guinea.

To expel the PAIGC forces that were occupying the Como island and other near islands in the southern region of the Portuguese Guinea, in January 1964, the Portuguese Armed Forces launch the Operation Trident, a major conventional type joint operation, on which, for the first time ship based helicopters were used and large scale amphibious assaults were made. The assaults against the several islands were supported by naval bombardments and air strikes. For the operation, the Navy employed the frigate Nuno Tristão—that served as the command post for the operation—the destroyer Vouga, seven patrol boats, eight landing craft and three detachments of Special Marines – that, together with a reinforced Army battalion, formed the landing forces.

In 1970, the Naval Forces in the Portuguese Guinea perform the secret Operation Green Sea (Operação Mar Verde), a major amphibious raid on Conakry, the capital of the neighboring Republic of Guinea, an open supporter and a sanctuary for the PAIGC. The Operation was led by Lieutenant-Commander Alpoim Calvão, heading task force TG 27–2, composed of the patrol boats Cassiopeia, Dragão, Hidra and Orion and the landing craft Bombarda and Montante, carrying a landing force that included 250 Portuguese Commandos and Special Marines and 150 political opponents of the Guinean dictatorship. During the night of 21–22 November, the Portuguese forces were able to take the control of the city, neutralizing the Guinean Army and the locally based PAIGC forces, destroying several naval and military assets of the PAIGC and rescuing 26 Portuguese POWs that were being held in a local prison.

In the theatre of Mozambique, the main operational focus of the Portuguese Navy was the Lake Nyasa, in an effort to deter FRELIMO forces infiltrations from their bases in Tanzania and to cooperate with the Military of Malawi. This mission was done by the Nyasa Flotilla, operating mainly from the Metangula naval base, and by units of marines. The establishment of the Nyasa Flotilla was possible by the organization of complex logistical operations to transport a total of 12 patrol and landing craft from the coastal port of Nacala to Lake Nyasa, in a route of about 750 km by land. In the scope of the cooperation with the neighbor Malawi, the Portuguese Navy was deeply involved in the organization of its naval forces, transferring to them some of the Nyassa Flotilla boats. The Navy also focused in the resupply of the Portuguese Forces operating in Northern Mozambique, connecting them, by sea, with the main logistical centers in Lourenço Marques and Beira. With the beginning of the construction of the Cahora Bassa Dam and the spread of the FRELIMO guerrillas to the Tete region, in the early 1970s, the Navy oriented part of its effort to the Zambezi River.

In addition to its commitment in the Mozambican theatre of operations against the independence forces, from 1966, the Portuguese Navy had to maintain an oceanic task force in the Mozambique Channel, composed of frigates on rotation, to deter any possible hostile action from the British naval forces that kept stationed off the port of Beira to try to force the embargo of oil to Rhodesia, following its unilateral declaration of independence.

From 1971, the Portuguese naval presence in Mozambique included three frigates or corvettes, one logistical support ship, three patrol boats and one landing craft in the Indian Ocean, five patrol boats and seven landing craft in Lake Nyassa, three Special Marines detachments and three Marine companies.

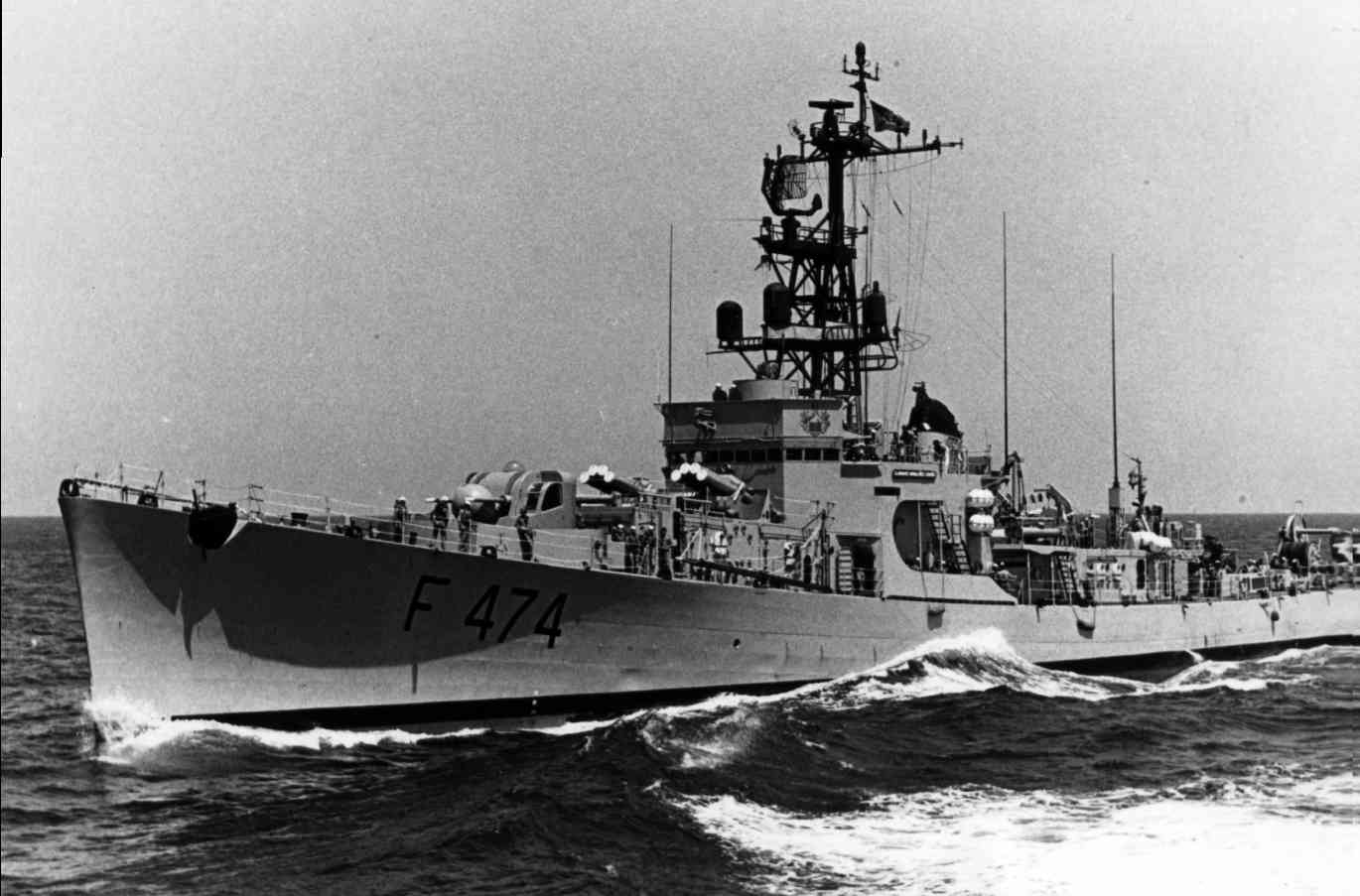
NRP Almirante Magalhães Correia, one of the anti-submarine frigates built in the 1960s to assure the Portuguese commitments towards NATO in the North Atlantic

Besides combat operations, the Portuguese Navy continued to provide long-range and coastal logistics to the Portuguese Armed Forces stationed in the several overseas territories of Portugal in the Atlantic (Cape Verde, São Tomé and Príncipe, Portuguese Guinea and Angola), the Indian Ocean (Mozambique) and the Pacific (Portuguese Timor and Macau).

The need to give priority for the acquisition of a large number of small units to operate in the African rivers delayed the plans for the ocean overseas force foreseen in the late 1950s. However, these plans went forward in the late 1960s, with the construction of ships capable of operating as anti-submarine ocean escorts and performing overseas patrol and landing operations. These ships were foreseen as a modern version of the avisos of the 1930s. For this role, four Comandante João Belo-class frigates were ordered from French yards. In parallel, the Portuguese Navy's engineer Rogério d'Oliveira designed a revolutionary type of ship for the role, which would be the João Coutinho-class corvettes. These corvettes were the first modular ships in the world, capable of being adapted for several types of missions, including anti-submarine warfare and amphibious operations, all while being cheap to operate. Its design would soon be copied, giving origin to a series of frigates and corvettes classes that served several navies. For the operations in Africa, the João Coutinho-class corvettes were designed with small draft to be able to navigate near the coast and in large rivers and had accommodations on board for a force of Marines, being capable of supporting it in landing operations. Six ships of the João Coutinho class were built, these being followed by four of the improved Baptista de Andrade-class corvettes.

Besides the efforts made in the Overseas wars, during this period the Navy was able to continue to guarantee Portuguese naval commitments to the NATO missions in the North Atlantic. To be able to continue to support these missions, the Portuguese Navy built three Almirante Pereira da Silva-class anti-submarine frigates and acquired four Albacora-class submarines. As part of the commitments to NATO, the Portuguese Navy supported the installation of the COMIBERLANT in Lisbon and deployed the Almirante Pereira da Silva-class frigates to regularly participate in the STANAVFORLANT since its creation.

=== Decolonization and late Cold War ===
On the early morning of 25 April 1974, young officers of the Portuguese Armed Forces triggered the almost bloodless Carnation Revolution, which overthrew the Salazar regime. Incidentally, NATO's Atlantic force, STANAVFORTLAND was leaving the Tagus on the day of the Revolution, integrating the Portuguese frigate Almirante Gago Coutinho. Whilst disembarking with the other NATO ships, Almirante Gago Coutinho was ordered by the Portuguese Navy Staff to leave the international formation, turn back and place itself in front of the Terreiro do Paço riverside square, where most of the revolutionary forces were congregated. Once in position, the frigate was ordered to open fire against the armored vehicles of the revolutionary forces, but its crew refused.

The new regime quickly negotiated ceasefires with the insurgents in Angola, Mozambique and Guinea, ending the Overseas wars. This was soon followed by the independence of the Portuguese African territories, the first being Guinea-Bissau (ex-Portuguese Guinea) on 10 September 1974 and the last being Angola on 11 November 1975. Most of the Portuguese small naval units based in those territories were transferred to the newly established nations. The Navy supported the withdrawal of many thousands of Portuguese troops and civilians from Africa, transporting them back to Portugal. On the day of Angolan independence, the task force FO 15 – which included the frigates Hermenegildo Capelo and Roberto Ivens, the corvette General Pereira d'Eça and the tanker São Gabriel, together with the hospital-ship Gil Eannes and the troop transport ships Niassa and Uige – executed the last of these operations in the bay of Luanda, taking on board Vice-Admiral Leonel Cardoso, the last Portuguese governor, and a military detachment then sailing to Lisbon.

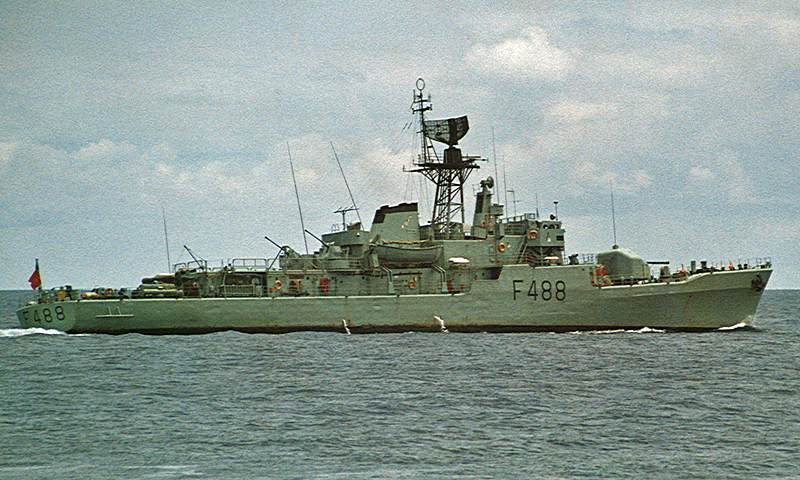
NRP Afonso Cerqueira, a Baptista de Andrade-class corvette

Follow the Carnation Revolution, the Portuguese authorities also started preparations for the independence of East Timor (ex-Portuguese Timor), which unlike the African colonies had no recent history of revolutionary guerilla activity. Political organizing was legalized, but dispute between the new Timorese political parties soon devolved into an armed conflict, forcing the recently appointed Portuguese governor Mário Lemos Pires to withdraw to Atauro Island, 25 km (16 mi) off Dili, in late August 1975. Per request from Lemos Pires, the Portuguese Navy sent the newly built corvette NRP Afonso Cerqueira, which arrived in the waters of Timor in early October 1975. The corvette NRP João Roby joined it in early December. On 7 December 1975, nearby Indonesia took advantage of the instability and undertook an invasion of East Timor.

Upon detecting the Indonesian invasion, the naval units evacuated Portuguese authorities and a small military detachment from Atauro to friendly territory in Australia. They remained in the area with the mission to continue to patrol the waters around Timor, in preparation for possible military action in response the invasion. Ultimately no response was forthcoming, with the last remaining Portuguese naval assets retreating in the first half of 1976. Other Western powers likewise either declined to intervene or, in the case of the United States, explicitly approved of Indonesia's invasion one day prior and extensively armed its forces, relegating East Timor to a quarter century of Indonesian occupation.

By the end of 1975, for the first time in 500 years, Portugal was again a mostly European country, save for Macau, and its Navy a merely North Atlantic navy. The Portuguese Navy refocused its efforts on defense of the Atlantic against the potential naval threat of the Warsaw Pact states in the context of the late Cold War. The Navy also focused on its responsibility for the patrol and control of the redefined exclusive economic zone of Portugal, the 10th largest in the world.

Going in to 1976, the Portuguese fleet included four Comandante João Belo-class frigates, three Almirante Pereira da Silva-class frigates, six João Coutinho-class corvettes, four Baptista de Andrade-class corvettes, three Albacora-class submarines, ten Cacine-class patrol ships, four support ships and one training ship, together with a number of remaining patrol boats, mine sweepers and landing craft. Although most of these ships were recent and modern, they had been mostly equipped to operate in support of low intensity conflicts in Africa, with limited capability for anti-submarine and anti-ship roles. A planned fleet retrofit program, including the installation of anti-ship and SAM missiles on the frigates and corvettes, could not proceed due to lack of funds. Without modernization, the Almirante Pereira da Silva-class frigates would soon be considered obsolete, being taken out of service in the early 1980s, but remaining moored at the Lisbon Naval Base until finally decommissioned in the early 1990s.

With no significant new ships commissioned for many years, the Portuguese Navy spent most of the 1980s with four frigates, ten corvettes, three submarine and ten patrol ships, besides the support ships and minor units. The lack of specialized offshore patrol vessels meant that the corvettes and even frigates were intensively used for fishery protection and maritime search and rescue missions, besides their original military roles.

=== Activity since 1990 ===
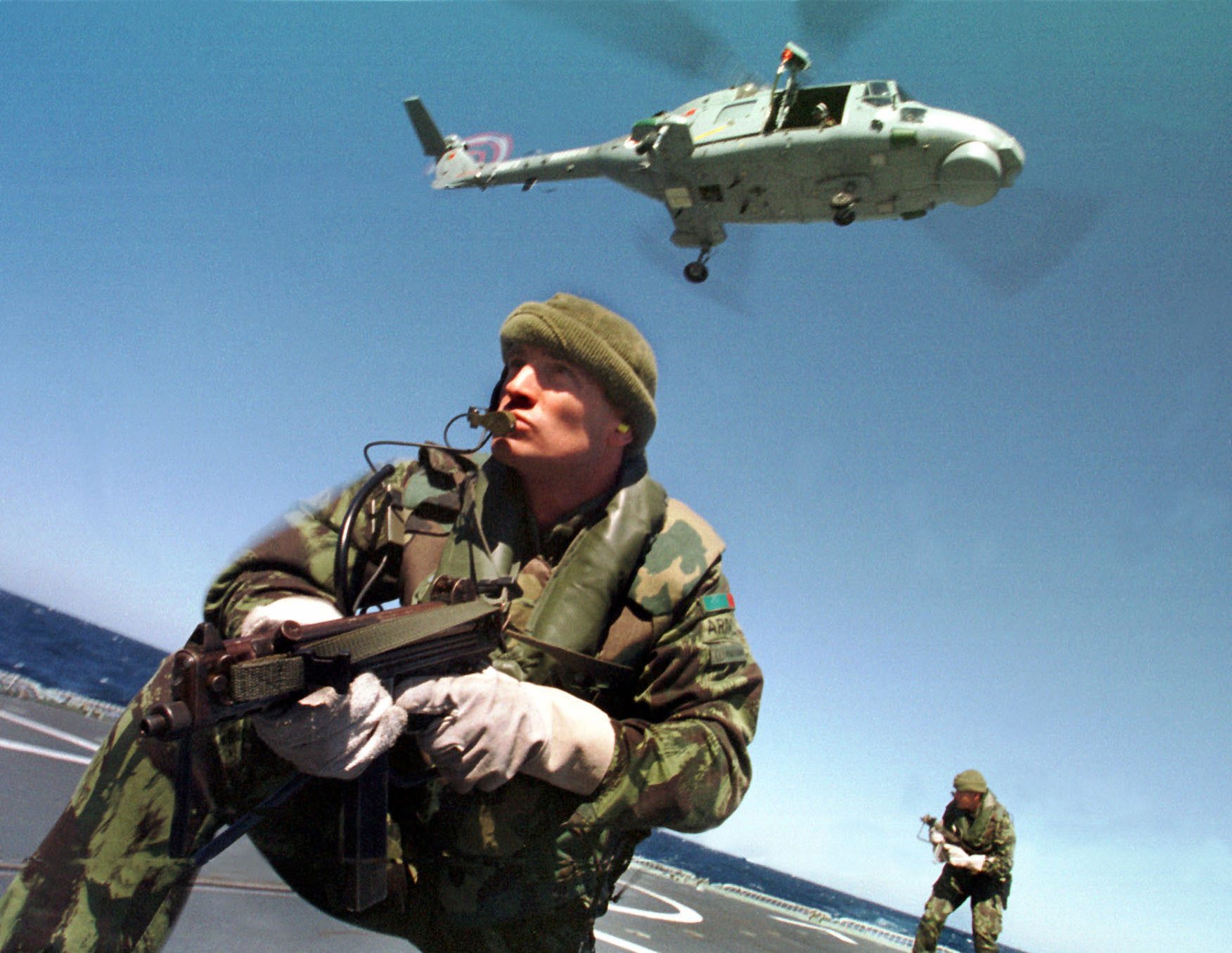
A Portuguese Marine (fuzileiros) team conducts a boarding exercise, under the coverage of a Navy's Super Lynx helicopter, in 1998

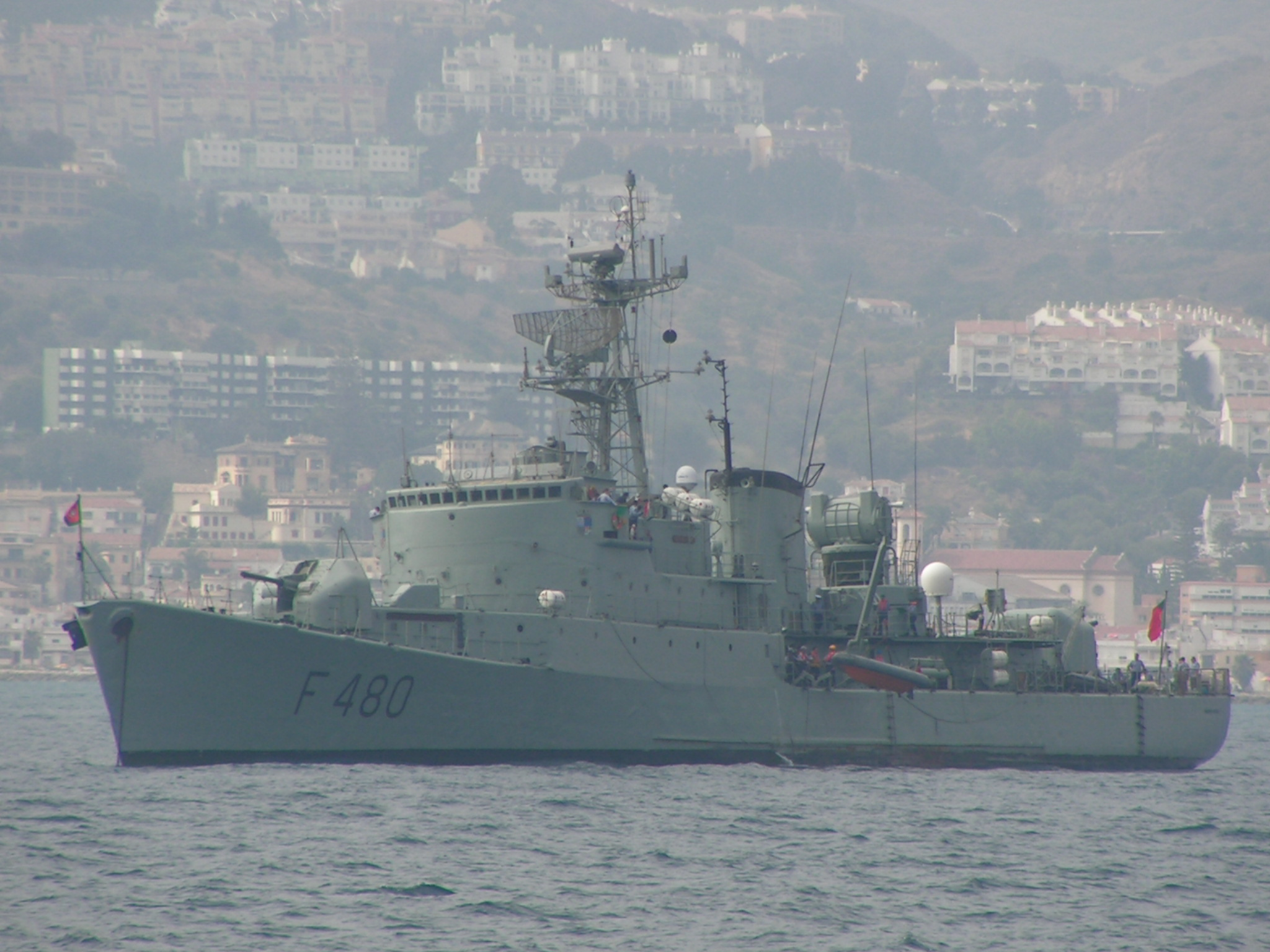
NRP Comandante João Belo, lead ship of the João Belo-class frigates, in the Mediterranean in 2005

Since 1990, the Portuguese Navy has participated in various long-range missions where it has effectively conducted Portugal's foreign policy, using its units solely or integrated in vaster campaigns articulated with the Portuguese Army and the Portuguese Air Force. The Portuguese Navy has been especially active in peace-enforcement campaigns using combat ships, helicopter missions and special force marine detachments in amphibious and air evacuation of Portuguese nationals and other foreign civilians from dangerous war zones in Sub-Saharan Africa. The most notable missions performed were in Bolama (Guinea-Bissau, 1990), Luanda (Angola, 1992), and Bissau (Guinea-Bissau, 1998 and again in 1999). In these theatres the Portuguese Armed Forces set up secure zones amidst the combat areas, and evacuation units, sometimes operated by Portuguese Army special forces or Portuguese Marines Special Actions Detachment (DAE) to retrieve civilians from hot-spots and evacuate them onto frigates stationed off-shore or onto Portuguese Air Force C-130 Hercules transports, as in Angola in 1992.

The Portuguese Navy has also actively participated in several international peace-keeping and peace-enforcing efforts in conjunction with other NATO, United Nations or European Union forces in numerous theatres, distant from Portuguese territory.

In the 1990s, the Portuguese Navy was modernized with new vessels that included the Vasco da Gama-class frigates and the Portuguese designed and built Argos-class patrol boats. The Navy's aviation was reborn with the reception of Westland Lynx helicopters. These new systems greatly increased the Navy's capacity to intervene in the high seas and the shores.

During the liberation of Kuwait in 1990–91, the Portuguese Navy logistics ship NRP São Gabriel supported allied forces in the Persian Gulf. In the various Balkan wars which resulted from the dismembering of Yugoslavia, the Portuguese Navy was an active player in Portugal's UN and NATO commitment, maintaining a frigate with DAE special forces in the Adriatic Sea continuously between 1991 and 2000, and commanding the NATO Operation Active Endeavour in the Mediterranean Sea in December 2001 and January 2002. Closer to home, the Portuguese Navy has consistently contributed patrol boats and corvettes to joint-nation EU exercises designed to aid Spain in dealing with its problem of illegal immigration and drug-trafficking off the Southern coast and the Canary Islands. During the Prestige oil-spill incident, off the coast of Northern Spain, Portugal dispatched various frigates and surveillance aircraft to the area, which were fundamental in providing independent information regarding the events.

On 7 June 1998, a military coup occurring in Guinea-Bissau, would trigger a major naval rescue operation that would demonstrate the capacity of the Portuguese Navy to intervene at thousands of kilometers away from Portugal. The coup quickly evolved into a civil conflict opposing the rebel forces to the forces loyal to the Government (with military support from the neighbors Senegal and Republic of Guinea), with thousands of Portuguese and other foreign residents being caught in the middle of the fights. The Portuguese Armed Forces immediately prepared a rescue operation, codenamed Crocodile (Operação Crocodilo). An initial evacuation of civilians was made by the Portuguese merchant ship MS Ponta de Sagres, that was navigating in the region.

On 11 June, under the command of Captain Hélder Costa Almeida, Ponta de Sagres entered in the Port of Bissau, under artillery fire, rescuing more than 2,200 civilians, including 500 Portuguese nationals. An air evacuation, planned to be conducted by Portuguese Air Force C-130 aircraft and Special Operations forces deployed to Senegal, had to be cancelled, due to the occupation of the Bissau International Airport by belligerent forces. The Portuguese Navy sent a naval force, under the command of Captain Melo Gomes, composed of the frigate Vasco da Gama, the corvettes Honório Barreto and João Coutinho and the support ship Bérrio.

Bérrio carried on board a Marine force that included the Special Actions Detachment (DAE), the 22nd Marine Company and support elements (command, liaison, boat, divers and medical teams). The Portuguese naval force arrived at Guinea-Bissau on 15 June and the next day entered Geba River. Its Marine force—led by the DAE operatives—landed and occupied the Port of Bissau, starting the evacuation of Portuguese citizens and foreign nationals to the ships. Later, additional people were collected from other parts of the coast of Guinea-Bissau, using rubber boats and helicopters, in a total of more than 1,200 rescued citizens.

On 28 June, under the mediation of the Community of Portuguese Language Countries, the negotiations for a ceasefire between the belligerents began on board the frigate NRP Vasco da Gama. Operation Crocodile terminated on 21 July 1998, with the Portuguese naval force leaving the waters of Guinea-Bissau and being rendered by the frigate NRP Corte-Real.

Portuguese Navy Marine contingents have also participated in United Nations peacekeeping missions in Kinshasa (Zaire, 1997) and Congo (1998), East Timor (1999–2004), the European Union Mission in the Democratic Republic of Congo in 2006, and the NATO fleet off the coast of Somalia, where Portugal's Navy has played a prominent role. During the flooding of the Save River, in Mozambique (2000) a detachment of Portuguese Marines conducted flood rescue operations as part of the humanitarian relief effort.

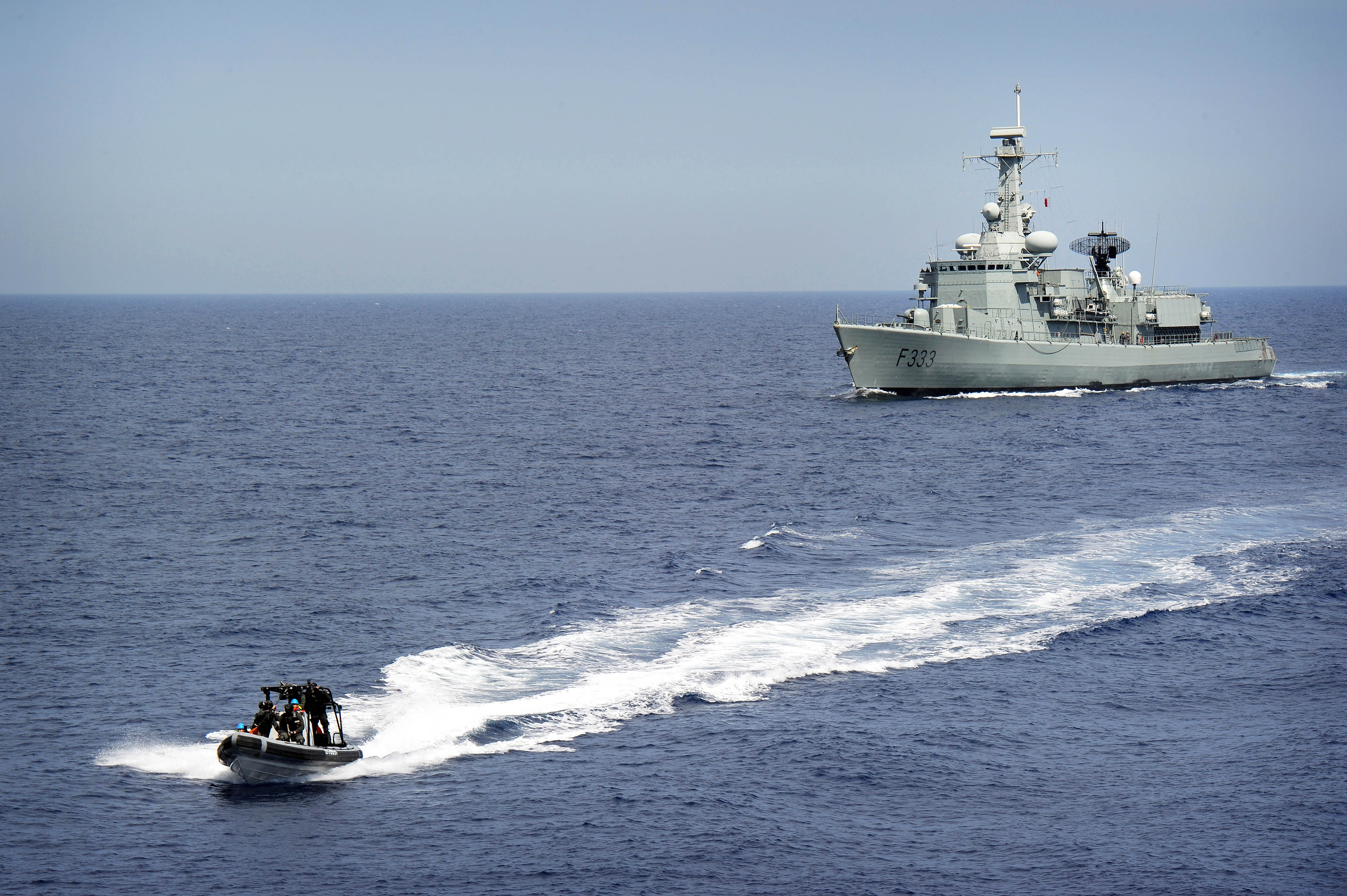
A VBSS team leaves NRP Bartolomeu Dias, lead frigate of the Bartolomeu Dias class

During the onset of East Timor's independence from Indonesia in 1999, Portugal sent two frigates and various troops to aid its former colony in the Pacific Ocean. NRP Vasco da Gama and NRP Hermenegildo Capelo remained in the area until mid-2001. A company of 155 Marines was also sent to the territory as part of Portugal's UN peacekeeping role while the situation was volatile. Since 2004 a smaller detachment of Portuguese Marines is integrated in the Timor Military Liaison Group closely coordinated with the Portuguese National Republican Guard (GNR) contingent stationed in the capital, Dili, and the Armed Forces of Timor.

The 2000s saw the reception of the Bartolomeu Dias-class frigates (replacing the old Comandante João Belo class), of the Tridente-class submarines (replacing the old Albacora class) and of the Portuguese designed and built Viana do Castelo-class patrol vessels (intended to gradually replace the João Coutinho-class and Baptista de Andrade-class corvettes).

The Vasco da Gama-class frigates Álvares Cabral and Corte Real have regularly contributed to long-range NATO exercises in the Indian Ocean, and both have served as NATO task-force flagships in the mission against Piracy in Somalia. During 2009 and January 2010, the NATO fleet in the Gulf of Aden was commanded by the Portuguese Navy, who received the award of "exceptional bravery at sea" from the International Maritime Organization for its successful attacks on pirate activity, conducted by Corte Real during the peak of pirate activity.

In parallel with its military roles, the Portuguese Navy continued to assume an important scientific role, mainly in the scope of the oceanographic and hidrographic research. The scientific missions of the Navy are led by the Hydrographic Institute, with the support of the Hydrographic Ships Group. One important role in this area is the support to the Mission for the Extension of the Continental Shelf of Portugal, that has been given since 2004. For this mission, the hydrographic surveys carried away by the Dom Carlos I-class research ships have been crucial. The success of this mission, allowed Portugal to be able to substantiate and present its Extended continental shelf beyond the 200 nautical miles claim to the United Nations in 2009. If the claim is accepted, the Portuguese Continental Shelf will become one of the largest in the World.

In the 2010s, the Portuguese Armed Forces created the Immediate Reaction Force (FRI, Força de Reação Imediata), with the main mission conducting operations of evacuation of Portuguese citizens from regions under crisis or tension. The initial core of its naval component—with an operational readiness of 48 hours—has permanently assigned a frigate, a corvette, a Marine company, a sappers divers detachment, a mine warfare detachment and, when available, a submarine and a fleet tanker. The Navy' Special Actions Detachment is assigned to the special operations component of the force. The FRI—including its naval component—was activated and pre-positioned in Cape Verde in April 2012, prepared to intervene in Guinea-Bissau if needed, following a military coup that occurred in that country.

The Navy is also developing the Portuguese Task Group (PO TG), a naval force aimed to guarantee a naval warfare national autonomous capacity. This force is intended to act as a naval element of power projection, able to intervene in any place of the national interest strategic space of Portugal. The PO TG is planned to include submarines, ocean escorts, amphibious and logistical support ships, Marine and special operations forces, divers units and hydrographic ships. An important element will be a landing platform dock ship, whose planned acquisition has been however delayed. The readiness of the PO TG has been regularly trained and evaluated in the INSTREX series naval exercises.

== Organisation ==
Distinctive flag of the Chief of Staff of the Portuguese Navy

The Portuguese Navy is under the command of the Chief of Staff of the Navy (CEMA, Chefe do Estado-Maior da Armada). He/she is the only full admiral in active service in the navy and is proposed by the government and vested by the President of Portugal. The CEMA also continues to be the head of the National Maritime Authority, although this became separated from the Navy in 2014.

Besides the CEMA and under his command, the Portuguese Navy includes:

- Naval Staff (EMA, Estado-Maior da Armada);
- central bodies of administration and management: Superintendence of Personnel, Superintendence of Material, Superintendence of Finance and Superintendence of Information Technologies;
- naval component command: Naval Command and subordinate maritime zones commands (North, Center, South, Azores and Madeira);
- advising bodies: Admiralty Council, Superior Council of Discipline of the Navy and Medical Revision Board of the Navy;
- inspection body: Inspection-General of the Navy;
- base bodies:
  1. bases: Lisbon Naval Base and Support Unit of the Navy Central Facilities,
  2. Naval School,
  3. Navy Vocational Training System schools and centers: Marines School, Hydrography and Oceanography School, Diving School, Naval Technologies School and Naval Integrated Training and Evaluation Center,
  4. squadrons and groups of operational units: Surface Ships Squadron, Subsurface Ships Squadron and Helicopters Squadron,
  5. service execution bodies: Underwater and Hyperbaric and Naval medical centers, laboratories and depots, Hydrographic Base, naval support points and other bodies;
- cultural bodies: Marine Academy, Vasco da Gama Aquarium, Navy Band, Central Library of the Navy, Navy Museum, Calouste Gulbenkian Planetarium and Navy Magazine;
- elements of the operational component of the system of forces:
  1. Marine Corps Command,
  2. forces: naval forces and Marine forces,
  3. operational units and assets: naval, Marine and divers,
  4. centers of the operational component of the system of forces: command centers, command posts and operations support centers;
- bodies regulated by specific legislation: Hydrographic Institute and Maritime Search and Rescue Service.

== Culture ==
=== Ceremonial musical support ===
Musical support is rendered by two formations under the Cultural Center of the Navy: one military band and one fanfare band/drum and bugle corps.

==== Navy Band ====
The Navy Band (Banda da Armada) traces its origins to 1740, when a band called Charamela da Armada was established to provide musical support to the then Royal Navy. Dissolved many times, its current form dates back from the 1880s. Today, under its current Director of Music, Commander Délio Alexandre Coelho Gonçalves it continues a long legacy of service in support of the Navy's primary missions and in the ceremonial role. In April 1903 the Band provided the music to the first ever audio recording ever to be made in Portugal, in memory of the recent visit of British King Edward VII to the country. The band also has been active in a number of foreign engagements beginning in 1922, when musicians performed in Brazil to celebrate the country's centennial year of independence. As the Navy's sole band, it continues the heritage and traditions of the bands that have had served the Navy for many centuries.

==== Fanfare Band of the Navy ====
Known in Portuguese as the Fanfarra da Armada, its history dates back to 1837. Until that year the Royal Brigade, ancestor to the Marine Corps, have had drummers, fifers, buglers and trumpeters in its ranks, a tradition inherited by the current Brazilian Marine Pipes, Drum and Bugle Corps, by itself a descendant of the field musicians of the Royal Brigade that arrived in Brazilian lands in 1808. The current formation actually is rooted from the twin formations of the Naval Battalion formed that year: the Corps of Drums/Field Music (Charanga Marcial) and the Fanfare Section of the battalion, the former organized in the British and French manner of a corps of drums and the latter as a drum and bugle corps. Combined the ensembles were composed of 51 members, divided into 34 musicians (1 bass drummer, 10 snare drummers, 5 fifers, 5 bass trumpeters, 8 buglers, 10 trumpeters) and 16 field musicians (the latter made up of a drum major, a bass drummer, 5 fanfare trumpeters and 10 drummers). It was to be the basis of the field music of the units under the Corps of Military Seamen and the current form was established in 1937 on the basis of the regional drum and bugle formations of the Navy within Portugal and overseas. Since 1975, the band has been composed solely of personnel of the Marine Corps, and today is committed to fulfill the ceremonial duties of the Corps as well as of the entire Navy. With 30 drummers and trumpeters, it reports to the Marine Corps Command in Lisbon, and attends ceremonial events of the Navy as well as local events within Portugal. Playing solely using percussion (bass drum, tenor drums, snare drums and cymbals), fanfare trumpets and optionally helicons (and formerly bugles), the Fanfare Band is led on the field and parade by the Drum Major, using since the 1980s a replica mace similar to that used by the Naval Battalion. All wear the black beret with their dress and service uniforms.

== National Maritime Authority ==
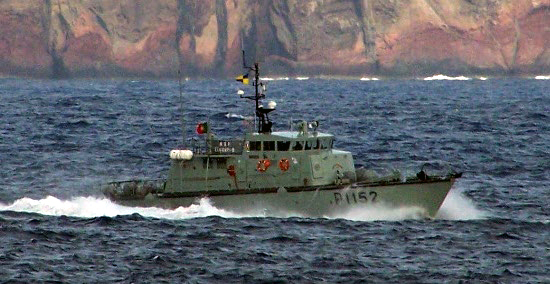
The patrol boat NRP Escorpião, one of the naval assets regularly placed at the disposal of the AMN by the Portuguese Navy

The National Maritime Authority (Autoridade Marítima Nacional) or AMN is the public body responsible for most of the coast guard type activities in Portugal, including the security, safety, life-guard, lighthouses and pollution fighting at sea. For hundreds of years and until 2014, the maritime authority role in Portugal was performed by the Navy, with the AMN constituting a branch of it. However, due to the constitutional issues of having a branch of the Armed Forces performing an internal security role, the AMN was separated from the Navy in 2014, being now formally an entire separate organization. However, although legally separate, the AMN and the Navy organizations still override in many aspects. So, a single person has the double hat of being the head of the Navy (with the title of "Chief of Staff of the Navy") and the head of the AMN (with the title of "National Maritime Authority"). The same happens with other persons that have double hats (e.g. the Navy's maritime zone commanders are also the AMN heads of maritime departments, which territorial jurisdictions coincides). Besides this, the Navy continues to provide naval and other assets to the service of the AMN and continues to staff with its personnel a number of bodies of the AMN.

The term "National Maritime Authority" has a double meaning, referring both to an entity and to an organization. As an entity, AMN is the person responsible for the administration and coordination of the organization, who inherently is the admiral that has the role of Chief of Staff of the Navy. This person is frequently referred as "Admiral AMN" to distinguish him/her from the AMN organization. As an organization, AMN is the structure that includes the Directorate-General of the Maritime Authority (DGAM) and the Maritime Police (PM). Among other bodies, the DGAM includes itself the Life Guard Institute, the Directorate of Lighthouses, the maritime departments, captaincies of the ports and maritime delegations, the Sea Pollution Fighting Service and the Maritime Authority School.

The National Maritime Authority is part of the Maritime Authority System, which includes other public agencies that also perform authority duties at the sea.

== Ships and aircraft ==
=== Submarines ===
Class	Photo	Type	Units	Built	Note
Tridente class		Attack submarine	NRP Tridente (S160); NRP Arpão (S161)	2010	Displacement: 2020 t Length: 68 m Speed: 20 kn Range: 12 000 NM Complement: 33

=== Frigates ===
Class	Photo	Type	Units	Built	Note
Bartolomeu Dias class		Multipurpose frigate	NRP Bartolomeu Dias (F333); NRP Dom Francisco de Almeida (F334)	1994	Displacement: 3320 t Length: 122.5 m Speed: 30 kn Range: 5 000 NM; Complement: 176
Vasco da Gama class		Multipurpose frigate	NRP Vasco da Gama (F330) (Being repaired since 2025); NRP Álvares Cabral (F331); NRP Corte-Real (F332)	1991–1992	Displacement: 3200 t Length: 115.90 m Speed: 32 kn Range: 4 000 NM; Complement: 180

=== Patrol vessels ===
Class	Photo	Type	Units	Built	Note
Viana do Castelo class		Offshore Patrol Vessel	NRP Viana do Castelo (P360); NRP Figueira da Foz (P361); NRP Sines (P362); NRP Setúbal (P363); 6 more ordered in 2023	2010-2019	Displacement: 1750 t Length: 83.1 m Speed: 20 kn Range: 4859 NM; Complement: 35
Tejo class		Patrol vessel	NRP Tejo (P590); NRP Douro (P591); NRP Mondego (P592); NRP Guadiana (P593)	1992-1996	Displacement: 320 t Length: 54 m Speed: 30 kn Range: 3860 NM; Complement: 19
Cacine class		Patrol vessel	NRP Zaire (P1146)	1971	Displacement: 292 t Length: 44.1 m Speed: 20 kn Range: 2500 NM; Complement: 33
Argos class		Patrol boat	NRP Argos (P1150); NRP Dragão (P1151); NRP Escorpião (P1152); NRP Cassiopeia (P1153); NRP Hidra (P1154)	1991	Displacement: 97 t Length: 27 m Speed: 26 kn Range: 1350 NM; Complement: 8
Centauro class		Patrol boat	NRP Centauro (P1155); NRP Oríon (P1156); NRP Pégaso (P1157); NRP Sagitário (P1158)	2000-2001	Displacement: 94 t Length: 27 m Speed: 26 kn Range: 1350 NM; Complement: 8
Rio Minho class		Patrol boat	NRP Rio Minho (P370)	1991	Displacement: 70 t Length: 22.5 m Speed: 9.5 kn Range: 800 NM; Complement: 8

=== Research vessels ===
Class	Photo	Type	Units	Built	Note
Dom Carlos I class		Offshore research vessel	NRP Dom Carlos I (A522); NRP Almirante Gago Coutinho (A523)	1985-1989	Displacement: 2300 t Length: 68.7 m Speed: 10.5 kn Range: 6400 NM Complement: 49
Andrómeda class		Coastal research vessel	NRP Andrómeda (A5203); NRP Auriga (A5205)	1987-1988	Displacement: 245 t Length: 31.4 m Speed: 12 kn Range: 1980 NM Complement: 19

=== Sailing vessels ===
Class	Photo	Type	Units	Built	Note
Gorch Fock class		Tall ship	NRP Sagres	1937	Displacement: 1940 t Length: 70.4 m Speed: 10.5 kn Range: 5450 NM Complement: 139
Creoula class		Sail training ship	UAM Creoula	1937	Displacement: 1300 t Length: 67.4 m Speed: 5 kn Range: Complement: 38
Polar class		Sailing vessel	NRP Polar	1977	Displacement: 70 t Length: 22.9 m Speed: Range: Complement: 5
Zarco class		Sailing vessel	NRP Zarco	1983	Displacement: 60 t Length: 23 m Speed: Range: Complement: 4

=== Auxiliary vessels ===
The Portuguese Navy has dozens of small vessels, of which 35 are Navy Auxiliary Units. All of these vessels belong to the Maritime Authority System.

- 12 rescue crafts;
- 7 captaincy vessels;
- 16 other vessels, such as armed speedboats belonging to Portuguese Marine Corps and anti pollution boats.

=== Unmanned surface vehicles (USVs) ===
The Portuguese Navy operates a number of unmanned surface vehicles (USVs).

- 4 × (Portugal) CEOV Trator do Mar;
- 1 × (Portugal) Unmanned Maritime Vehicle Hidrográfico X-2601;
- 1 × (Portugal) Unmanned Maritime Vehicle X-2701;
- 1 × (Portugal) Unmanned Maritime Vehicle X-2801;
- 1 × (Portugal) Unmanned Maritime Vehicle Orca;
- 1 × (Portugal) Tecnoveritas UOPV Unmanned Oceanic Patrol Vessel.

=== Unmanned underwater vehicles (UWVs) ===
- ? × (Portugal) OceanScan-MS&T LAUV;
- 1 × (Portugal) OceanScan SABUVIS II (Biomimetic Underwater Vehicle);
- ? × (United States) Teledyne Marine Gavia;
- ? × (Italy) Graal Tech X-300.

=== Future procurement ===
Ship types that are planned:

- 2 new diesel-electric submarines;
- 1 amphibious transport dock vessel – locally known as Navio Polivalente Logístico (NPL);
- 1 landing platform known as NRP D. João II - to operate helicopters, unmanned aerial vehicles and unmanned underwater vehicles. Ordered 2024 from Damen shipyards for $132 million Euros, to enter service 2026;
- 2 Multi-Role Support Ships – To be built by STM Shipyard in Turkey to replace Berrio-class fleet tanker. Under construction.
- 6 Viana do Castelo-class patrol vessels.
- 8 new Coastal Patrol Vessels to replace the Argos, Centauro, Minho and Tejo class patrol vessels.
- 3 (and up to 6) new Italian FREMM EVO Frigates

=== Aircraft ===
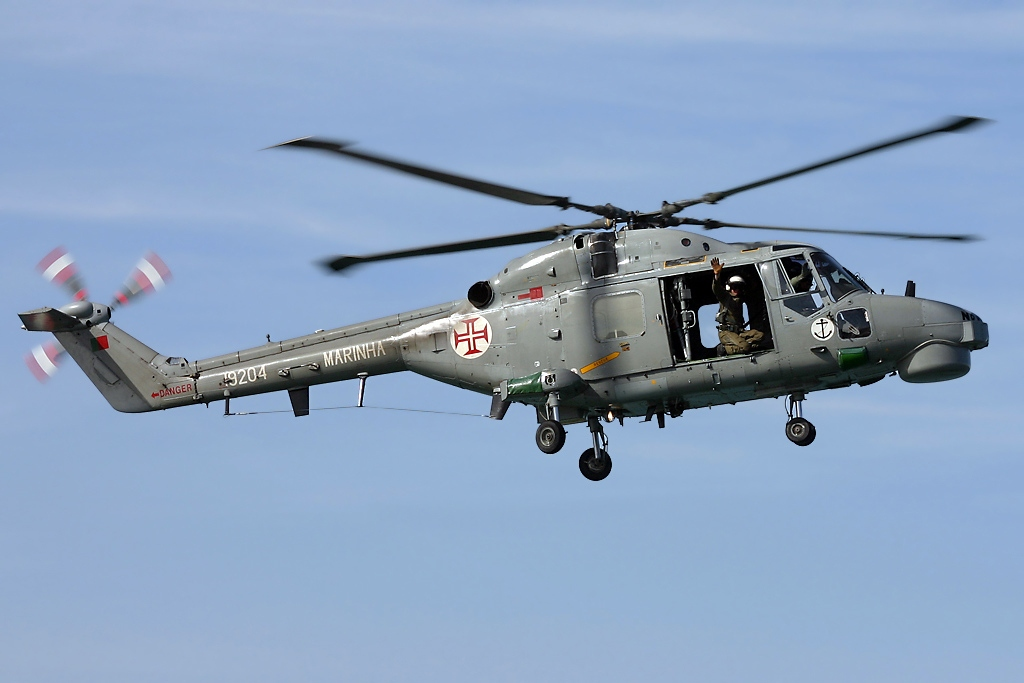
Westland Lynx

The Navy only has rotary assets, there has been no fixed-wing air support since 1952 when the Curtiss SB2C Helldiver fighters were in use. Only the largest of the Portuguese Navy's vessels are capable to support aviation: two frigates classes (Bartolomeu Dias class and Vasco da Gama class), four patrol vessels (Viana do Castelo class), the largest corvette class (Baptista de Andrade class) and a tanker (Bérrio class).

The Navy currently has five Westland Lynx Mk.95A Super Lynx helicopters in service.

=== Unmanned aerial vehicles (UAVs) ===
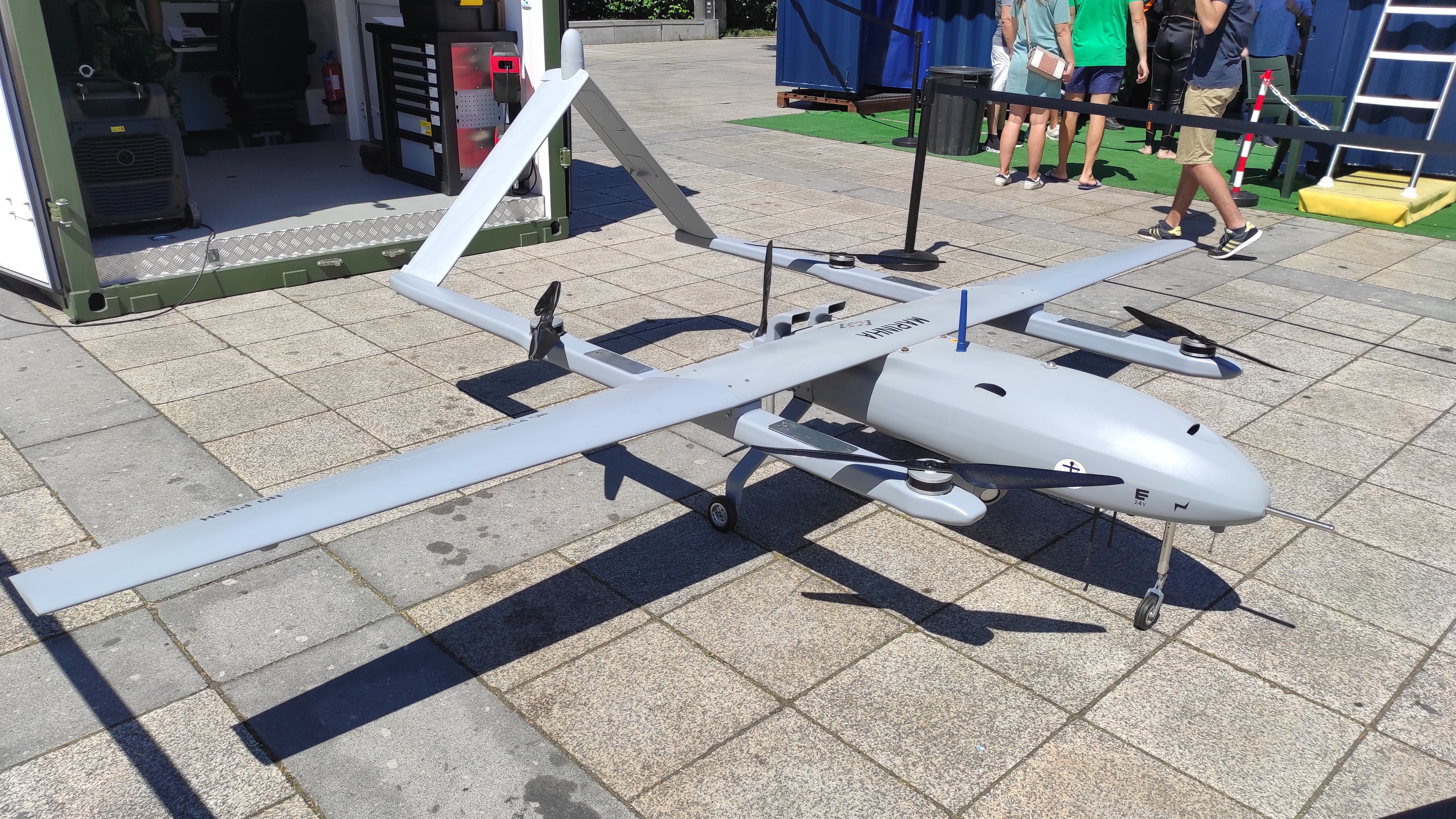
UAVision OGASSA OGS42 VTOL of the Portuguese Navy.

- 6 × (Portugal) Beyond Vision VTOne.
- 6 × (Portugal) Beyond Vision HEIFU.
- 4 × (Portugal) UAVision UX Spyro;
- 2 × (Portugal) UAVision Ogassa OGS42/V;
- ? × (Portugal) X-1001;
- ? × (United States) AeroVironment RQ-20 Puma;
- ? × (France) Parrot Anafi UKR;
- ? × (China) Autel EVO II Dual 640T Enterprise V2;
- 1 × (China) AUTEL EVO MAX 4T V2.

== Ranks and insignia ==
=== Officers ===
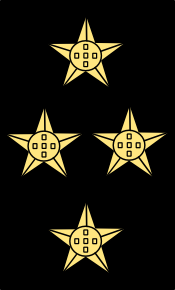
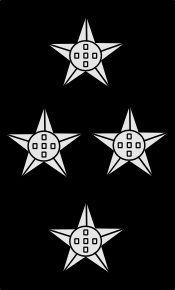
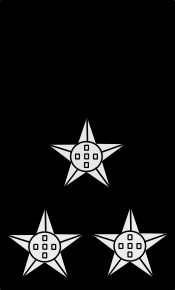
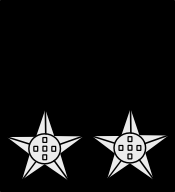
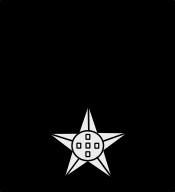
NATO code	OF-10	OF-9	OF-8	OF-7	OF-6	OF-5	OF-4	OF-3	OF-2	OF-1
Portuguese Navy
Portuguese Navy	Almirante da Armada	Almirante	Vice-almirante	Contra-almirante	Comodoro	Capitão de mar e guerra	Capitão de fragata	Capitão-tenente	Primeiro-tenente	Segundo-tenente	Guarda-marinha/ Subtenente

=== Ratings ===
NATO code	OR-9		OR-8	OR-7	OR-6	OR-5	OR-4		OR-3	OR-2		OR-1
Portuguese Navy											No insignia	No insignia
Portuguese Navy	Sargento-mor	Sargento-chefe	Sargento-ajudante	Primeiro-sargento	Segundo-sargento	Subsargento	Cabo-mor	Cabo	Primeiro-marinheiro	Segundo-marinheiro	Primeiro-grumete	Segundo-grumete

== See also ==
- List of ships of the Portuguese Navy
- Military history of Portugal
- Fuzileiros, Portuguese Marine Corps
- Special Actions Detachment, naval special operations unit
- Sapper Divers Group, combat divers unit.
- Portuguese Naval Aviation
- Maritime Museum of Lisbon
- Academia de Marinha
- Ship prefix
- Pennant number
