= Portuguese incursions in Zambia =

- Part of the Portuguese Colonial War
Date	1966–1969
Location	Angola–Zambia border; Mozambique–Zambia border

Belligerents
Portugal	Zambia

The Portuguese incursions in Zambia were a series of border operations led by Portuguese Armed Forces against nationalist guerrilla movements in Zambia during the Portuguese Colonial War. Between 1966 and 1969, there were about 60 Portuguese incursions into Zambian territory.
