= Portuguese irregular forces in the Overseas War =

In various theaters of operations in the Portuguese Colonial War arose at the outset the need to create various types of irregular forces to help the Portuguese Armed Forces.

These irregular forces were usually held at the local level of Theater of Operations and included various types in terms of origin and dependence: militias of white settlers, native militias and forces, foreign forces from exile, forces of ex-guerrillas, dependent forces the Civil Administration, forces dependent on the armed forces and forces dependent on the International and State Defense Police (PIDE).

Officially the totality of these forces was known by Auxiliary Forces. In Portuguese Guinea, General Spínola introduced the term African Force to designate the irregular forces composed of natives of the province.

In the theater of operations, the main irregular forces were as follows:

== Portuguese Angola ==
- Organização Provincial de Voluntários de Defesa Civil de Angola (Provincial Organization of Volunteers of Civil Defence of Angola) - mainly urban militia, consisting mainly of white settlers.
- Guarda Rural (Rural Guard) - auxiliary force of Public Security Police, dedicated to the defense of companies and farms.
- Formações Aéreas Voluntárias (Volunteer Aerial Formations) - aerial militia.
- Grupos Especiais (Special Groups) - units of volunteer black soldiers that had commando training.
- Tropas Especiais (Special Troops) - the name of the Special Groups in Cabinda.
- Fiéis (Faithfuls) - force composed of military and police from Katanga, exiled for opposing the regime of Mobutu; these men fled to Angola with their families in a total of nearly 5,000 people. The Portuguese Army selected 2,000 of these exiles and organized them on 3 Battalions of 5 companies each, with these three battalions placed in Chimbila, Camissombo and Gafaria; they had their own Katangan officers and sergeants.
- Leais (Loyals) - a force composed by exiles from Zambia, black soldiers that were against Kenneth Kaunda.
- Flechas (Arrows) - a very successful unit, controlled by the PIDE/DGS, composed by Bushmen, that specialized in tracking, reconnaissance and pseudo-terrorist operations.

== Portuguese Guinea ==
- Corpo de Milícias (Militia Corps) - made up of Africans, mainly for self-defense of villages, they were divided into two types: the Regular Militia, defensive, organized in 45 companies of 200 men, and the Special Militias, similar to Special Groups in other colonies, organized in 23 groups of 31 men.
- Comandos Africanos (African Commandos) - units of commandos entirely composed by black soldiers, including the officers.
- Fuzileiros Especiais Africanos (African Special Marines) - Marine units entirely composed by black soldiers, including the officers.

== Portuguese Mozambique ==
- Organização Provincial de Voluntários de Defesa Civil de Moçambique (Provincial Organization of Volunteers of Civil Defence of Mozambique) - an organization similar to the one of Angola, but in much smaller size and importance.
- Formações Aéreas Voluntárias (Volunteer Aerial Formations) - aerial militia.
- Aviação do Gabinete de Planeamento do Zambeze (Aviation of the Zambezi Planning Office) - civil aviation service, but with a paramilitary organization, responsible for giving air support to the security of Cahora Bassa Dam.
- Grupos Especiais (Special Groups) - force similar to that of Angola; at its height in Mozambique there were 84 groups of 90 men each.
- Grupos Especiais Paraquedistas (Paratrooper Special Groups) - units of volunteer black soldiers that had paratrooper training; they were organized into 12 groups of 70 men each and were attached to the Air Force.
- Grupos Especiais de Pisteiros de Combate (Combat Tracking Special Groups) - special units trained in tracking.
- Flechas (Arrows) - force similar to that of Angola.

== See also ==
- Portuguese Colonial War
