= Special Groups (Portugal) =

Special Groups Grupos Especiais
- Active: 1966-1975
- Country: Portuguese Angola, Portuguese Mozambique
- Allegiance: Portugal
- Branch: Portuguese Army
- Type: Commando
- Part of: Portuguese Armed Forces
- Nickname: GE
- Engagements: Portuguese Colonial War

The Special Groups or GE (Grupos Especiais in Portuguese) were commando of platoon size, set up from 1966 to 1974 by the Portuguese Armed Forces in Angola and in Mozambique. Later, Paratrooper Special Groups or GEP (Grupos Especiais Paraquedistas) were formed, these being units able to conduct airborne operations. By 1974 there were 84 GE and 12 GEP, with 7,700 members, operating in Mozambique and 90 GE, with 3,069 members, operating in Angola.

== Constitution and Training ==
Although they were trained and operated under the command of the Portuguese African Command (and Portuguese Air Force for the GEP), the GE were not integrated into the Armed Forces and were considered paramilitary forces. The GE were made up of local volunteers from African tribes, trained and led by senior Portuguese Army NCOs and officers and some Rhodesian veterans from the Second World War. With the exception of the GEP, each GE was usually fully established by members of the same ethnic African group. The GE received a similar training to commandos and the GEP to paratroopers. The GEP were created and used only in Mozambique. Training was at the Company level. A few Rhodesian veterans of the Second World War were tasked with the training, like Squadron Leader (retd) Francis Nicholson of the No. 237 Squadron RAF, Major (retd) Richard Brent, Company Sergeant Major Blessed Mbangwa and Platoon Sergeant (retd) Henry Utsaya of the Rhodesian African Rifles, Colour Sergeant (retd) Tony MacDonald of the 1 Special Service Battalion, Platoon Sergeant (retd) Angus Fraser and Corporal (retd) James Harris of the Rhodesia Regiment. Also involved in training and advisory roles were serving Rhodesian Police officers, Senior Sergeant Prosper Ndabingi, Senior Sergeant William Nkomo, Staff Lance Section Officer Piet Cronje and Chief Inspector Richard Davis of the British South Africa Police.

== Organization ==
Each GE or GEP was organized as a combat group (platoon-sized), consisting of an officer (commander of group), a sergeant (assistant) and 28 soldiers, organized into 3 sections, each consisting of two squads. Section leaders usually held the rank of corporal. The commander and sergeant from each group were typically military or former military personnel. The remaining fighters were local Africans. Usually four GEs or GEPs formed a company. A company headquarters element had the co-located assistance of two Alouette II helicopters loaned from the Portuguese Air Force or the Police, for transporting, medevac, target location and close air support during individual platoon or even section operations. A company would usually be led by a Portuguese major of the infantry or artillery with a captain as second-in-command, assisted by three lieutenants, four sergeant majors and eight sergeants looking after intelligence, operations, training and logistics, and cover an area of 100 square kilometres and population of 50,000. A platoon had two rifle sections armed with FN FAL and one 'heavy' section armed with 2 two-inch mortars and two M67 recoilless rifles. The two rifle sections each also had one FN MAG operator with another Rifleman carrying spare ammunition and barrels; and one Rifleman with a Rifle Grenade enabled FN FAL carrying three ENERGA anti-tank rifle grenades in the rifle grenade role. The heavy section was armed with FBP submachine guns with one lone rifleman armed with an FN FAL. From 1973 onwards, many of the heavy sections tended to discard their extra M67 recoilless rifle in favour of a single M2 Browning Heavy Machine Gun, mounted on a jeep. Each Platoon was armed with two AN/MPQ-4 counter mortar Radars, with which the platoon leader could track the location of enemy mortars and call in artillery and air support. The headquarters platoon of the company also had a heavy section used a flying firefighting squad for all platoons, armed with 2 M2 Browning HMGs and 1 mounted on two jeeps and a single M40 recoilless rifle on a jeep, commanded by a sergeant. The heavy section could be deployed into operation by helicopters.

While the GEP were all grouped together under a single parent unit the Batalhão de Grupos Especiais Páraquedistas (Battalion of Special Groups Paratroopers), the GE were dispersed, operating under the command of several regular Army units and employed as their intervention sub-units.

== Symbols and uniforms ==
The GE had, as a standard uniform, a completely black battledress. However, they often used the camouflaged uniform of the Portuguese Army in the field. As headgear, the GE used a Yellow beret and one GEP garnet red beret, both with the emblem of GE (Shield of Mozambique Province on a dagger and surrounded by a laurel wreath).

The GEP wore the Portuguese Air Force paratroopers camouflaged uniform and a Maroon beret. The GEP was the first Portuguese military force to use a red beret, prior to the commandos who only officially adopted its use in 1974.

== See also ==
- Flechas
- Portuguese irregular forces in the Overseas War
- Portuguese Colonial War
