= Frente Leste =

Frente Leste (Portuguese for Eastern Front) was the name of the theater of Portuguese Armed Forces' anti-guerrilla operations in the East of Angola (by then a Portuguese overseas territory), during the Portuguese Colonial War (1961-1974). After the success of the Portuguese military in the Eastern front by 1973, it started to be known as the Eastern Zone, since guerrilla warfare episodes were nonexistent. Through economic and social promotion campaigns, including the construction of healthcare, education, sanitation, transport and security infrastructure, the construction of new villages, the training of new black military units like the Flechas, and the foreign units known as the Fiéis (former gendarmes from Zaire) and the Leais (refugees from Zambia), the Portuguese operations in the late stage of the anti-guerrilla war in Portuguese Angola, eradicated all the main sources of conflict in the territory.

== History ==
=== Campaign in the Eastern Front ===
From 1966 to 1970, the pro-independence guerrilla movement People's Movement for the Liberation of Angola (MPLA), expanded their limited insurgency operations to the East of Angola. This vast countryside area was far way from the main urban centers and close to foreign countries were the guerrillas were able to take shelter. The National Union for the Total Independence of Angola (UNITA), a smaller pro-independence guerrilla organization established in the East, supported the MPLA.

Until 1970, the combined guerrilla forces of MPLA and UNITA in the East Front were successful in pressuring Portuguese Armed Forces (FAP) in the area to the point that the guerrillas were able to cross the Cuanza River and could threat the territory of Bié which had an important urban center in the agricultural, commercial and industrial town of Silva Porto.

In 1970, Francisco da Costa Gomes, the Chief-Commander of the Armed Forces of Angola, decided to reinforce the Eastern Front by relocating troops and armament from the North to the East. In 1971, the FAP started a counter-insurgency military campaign, that although provoking a number of civilian collateral damages in its first stage, effectively expelled the three guerrilla movements operating in the East of Angola to beyond the frontiers of the territory. The last guerrillas lost hundreds of soldiers and left tons of equipment behind, disbanding chaotically to the neighboring foreign countries in the region or in some cases, joining or surrendering to the Portuguese authorities. In order to gain the confidence of the local rural populations, and create conditions for their permanent and productive settlement in the region, the FAP organized massive vaccination campaigns, medical check-ups, water, sanitation and alimentary infrastructure. 45% of Eastern Angola population were under 15 years old and less than 10% of those children had gone to school. The FAP built schools and enforced policies to stimulating the admittance of the local child in those schools.

On 31 December 1972, the Development Plan of the East (Plano de Desenvolvimento do Leste) included in its first stage, 466 development enterprises (150 were completed and 316 were being built). 19 health centers had been built and 26 were being constructed. 51 new schools were operating and 82 were being constructed.

=== Life in the Eastern Zone ===
The move also included the grouping of the population in purpose-built villages as a way to better accomplish the imperatives of the two assigned missions: to contribute to the economic and social development of people and dissociate the population of the guerrillas and their influence, avoiding scattered rural villagers of being an easy source of coercive recruitment or logistics by the guerrillas.

The reorganization of populations in Angola took several forms that deserved the attention of journalists and writers, both foreign and national, that compared the development plans of the Portuguese authorities to what they knew what they did in the wars in Algeria and Vietnam. They were amazed how, without great resources in Eastern Angola, it was possible to put together the concept of strategic village to the concept of socioeconomic village to build a mixed settlement for the local populations. This was the typical village of East Zone in Phase 1, built from scratch for military reasons but where was exerted an intense economic and social promotion campaign.

In 1973, in the East were working five contracting firms with annual capacity to build 700 km of paved road and at the same time, the military engineering company proceeded to the opening and repair of trails with tactical operational interest.

=== Special military units ===
New all-black military units like the Flechas, the foreign units known as the Fiéis (former gendarmes from Zaire) and the Leais (refugees from Zambia), were armed, equipped and trained in order to combat the guerrillas and later were used to patrol the borders and perform routine security missions.

== Aftermath ==
After the Portuguese withdrawal from Angola in 1974-75 due to the events of the Carnation Revolution military coup in Lisbon, the MPLA and UNITA splintered, and the Angolan Civil War began as the movements clashed militarily and ideologically. MPLA leader Agostinho Neto became the first president of newly independent Angola, officially the People's Republic of Angola. Backed by Soviet and Cuban money, weapons and troops, the MPLA defeated the National Liberation Front of Angola (FNLA) militarily and forced them largely into exile. UNITA was also nearly destroyed in November 1975, but it managed to survive and set up a second government in the provincial capital of Huambo. UNITA was hard-pressed but recovered with South African aid and then was strengthened considerably by U.S. support during the 1980s. The MPLA's military presence was strongest in Angolan cities, the coastal region and the strategic oil fields, but UNITA controlled much of the highlands interior, notably the Bié Plateau, and other strategic regions of the country. Over 500,000 Angolans died in the civil war. Millions of refugees were displaced from their lands.

== See also ==
- South African Border War
- Operation Green Sea
- Gordian Knot Operation
