= Angola–Zambia border =

International border

Coordinates: 17°38′24″S 23°25′48″E

The Angola–Zambia border is 1,110 km (690 mi) in length and runs from the tripoint with the Democratic Republic of Congo, a series of rivers, two straight-line segment on the 13th parallel and the 22nd meridian, then a series of straight-line segments along the limit of the Kwando River Eastern flood plain into the tripoint with Namibia.
