= Portuguese Armed Forces =

Combined military forces of Portugal

- Forças Armadas
- Flag of the Portuguese Armed Forces
- Founded: 25 July 1139 (887 years, 119 days)
- Service branches: Portuguese Army; Portuguese Navy; Portuguese Air Force
- Headquarters: Lisbon, Portugal

Leadership
- President of Portugal: António José Seguro
- Prime Minister: Luís Montenegro
- Minister of National Defence: Nuno Melo
- Chief of the General Staff: General João Cartaxo Alves

Personnel
- Military age: 18–35
- Active personnel: 23,678 (2024)
- Deployed personnel: 1335 (2025)

Expenditure
- Budget: €5.900 billion (2025)
- Percent of GDP: 2.00% (2025)

Industry
- Domestic suppliers: Arsenal do Alfeite; Edisoft; EID, S.A. OGMA; Tekever; UAVision; West Sea Shipyard
- Foreign suppliers: Austria; Belgium; Brazil; Finland; France; Germany; Italy; Israel; Spain; Sweden; United Kingdom; United States; European Union; NATO
- Annual exports: €2,902 billion (2024)

Related articles
- History: Military history of Portugal
- Ranks: Military ranks of Portugal

The Portuguese Armed Forces (Portuguese: Forças Armadas) are the military of Portugal. They include the General Staff of the Armed Forces, the other unified bodies and the three service branches: Portuguese Navy, Portuguese Army and Portuguese Air Force.

The President of the Republic is the head of the Portuguese military, with the title of "Supreme Commander of the Armed Forces" (Comandante Supremo das Forças Armadas). The management of the Armed Forces and the execution of the national defense policy is however done by the government (chaired by the Prime Minister) via its Minister of National Defense. The highest-ranking officer in the military is the Chief of the General Staff of the Armed Forces, which has operational control of the Armed Forces during peacetime and assumes their full control when a state of war exists.

The Armed Forces are charged with protecting Portugal as well as supporting international peacekeeping efforts when mandated by North Atlantic Treaty Organization, the United Nations or the European Union.

Portugal was ranked the 3rd most peaceful country in the World in the Global Peace Index 2017, presently not having significant national security issues. The Portuguese Armed Forces have been thus focused in non-military public service activities and in external military operations. Recent external operations include anti-piracy action in the Gulf of Aden, the conflicts in the Central African Republic and in Afghanistan, the peacekeeping missions in East-Timor, Lebanon, Kosovo and Bosnia-Herzegovina, and the air policing of Iceland and the Baltic States.

Military units and other bodies are stationed all throughout Portuguese territory, including Continental Portugal, Madeira and the Azores.

The Portuguese Armed Forces were opened to women during the early 1990s. Portugal had mandatory conscription for all able-bodied men until November 2004.

== General principles ==
=== The national defense ===
The national defense is the activity whose objectives are to guarantee the State sovereignty, the national independence and the territorial integrity of Portugal, as well as to assure the liberty and security of the populations and the protection of the fundamental values of the constitutional order against any external threat or aggression. The national defense also assures the fulfillment of the international military agreements of the State, accordingly with the national interest.

The Portuguese Armed Forces are responsible for the military defense, which is the military component of the national defense.

=== The Armed Forces ===
The Portuguese Armed Forces are an essential pillar of the national defense and are the structure of the State that has as its main mission the military defense of the Republic. They obey to the competent bodies of sovereignty, accordingly with the Constitution and the law, being integrated in the State direct administration through the Ministry of National Defense. The bodies of State directly responsible for the national defense and the Armed Forces are the following:

- President of the Republic
- Assembly of the Republic
- Government
- Superior Council of National Defense

The Minister of National Defense is the politician responsible for the elaboration and execution of the military component of the national defense policy, for the administration of the Armed Forces and for the results of their employment.

=== System of forces ===
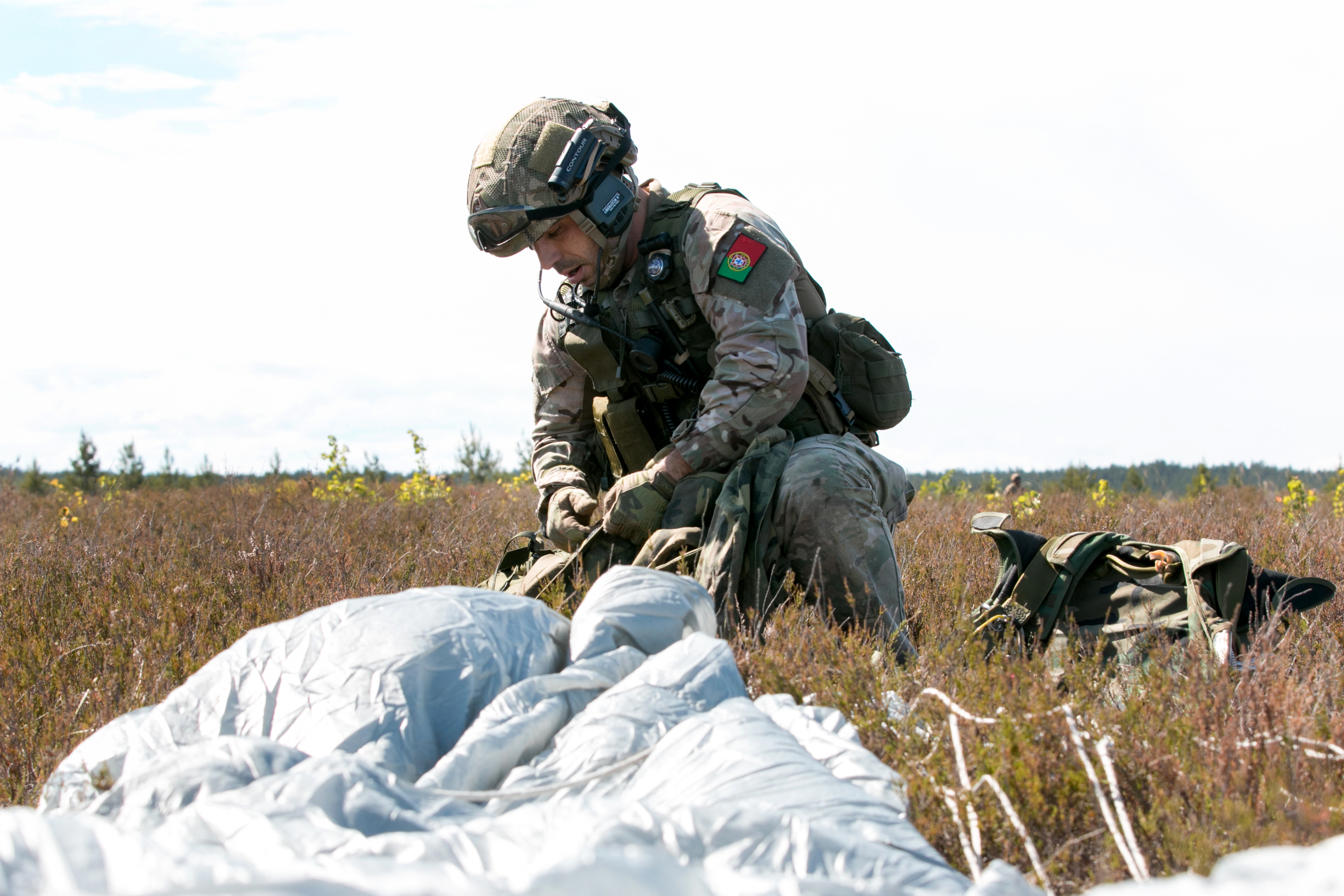
A Portuguese paratrooper gathers his chute and gear after landing into Adazi Base, Latvia, after conducting a high-altitude low-opening (HALO) jump

The system of forces defines the set of capacities that should exist for the fulfillment of the missions of the Armed Forces. It encompasses the set of systems of forces of all branches of the Armed Forces. The system of forces includes two components:

- Operational component - includes the set of assets and forces to be employed operationally. It is the dynamic part of the system of forces, including mainly deployable elements, such as frigates, infantry battalions and flying squadrons. The operational component includes also some non-deployable operational command bodies.
- Fix component - is the set of commands, units, establishments, bodies and services that are essential to the organization and general support of the Armed Forces and their branches. It is the static part of the system of forces, including only non-deployable elements, such as naval facilities, regiments and air bases.

=== Structure of the armed forces ===
The Portuguese armed forces' structure includes:

- the General Staff of the Armed Forces (EMGFA)
- the three branches of the Armed Forces: Navy, Army and Air Force
- the military bodies of command: Chief of the General Staff of the Armed Forces (CEMGFA), the Chief of Staff of the Navy, the Chief of Staff of the Army and the Chief of Staff of the Air Force
- the military bodies of advisement

=== Guidelines ===
The Armed Forces activity is mainly defined and oriented by the following strategic guidelines:

- The National Defense Law (Lei da Defesa Nacional, LDN) defines the general guidelines of the national defense, including the concept of national defense, the national defense policy, the responsibilities of the several bodies of State regarding national defense, the assignments and general structure of the Ministry of National Defense and of the Armed Forces, the participation of the citizens in the Homeland defense and the situation of State of War. The LDN is regularly updated, with the present version being the Law 21-A/2006.
- The Strategic Concept of National Defense (Conceito Estratégico de Defesa Nacional, CEDN) is the component of the national defense policy which defines the State's priorities in terms of defense, accordingly with the national interest. The present version of the CEDN was approved by the Council of Ministers through its Resolution 19/2013.
- The Organic Basic Law of the Organization of the Armed Forces (Lei Orgânica de Bases da Organização das Forças Armadas, LOBOFA) defines the organization of the Armed Forces. The present version of the LOBOFA is the Organic Law 1-A/2009.
- The Strategic Military Concept (Conceito Estratégico Militar, CEM) – due to the Strategic Concept of National Defense, it defines the conceptual guidelines of actuation of the Armed Forces and the general guidelines for its preparation, employment and sustainment. It is elaborated by the Council of Chiefs of Staff, approved by the Minister of National Defense and confirmed by the Superior Council of National Defense. The present CEM in force is the CEM 2014.
- The Military Programming Law (Lei de Programação Militar, LPM) establishes the programming of the public investment of the Armed Forces in terms of armament and equipment, for the modernization and operationalization of the system of forces, through the building of their capacities. The present version of the LPM is the Organic Law 7/2015.

== Current deployments ==
The national deployed forces (forças nacionais destacadas or FND) are units or teams deployed by the Portuguese Armed Forces in foreign missions, mostly in the scope of NATO, the United Nations or the European Union. Currently, the Portuguese Armed Forces maintain 1775 military personnel, 7 Military vessels and 9 aircraft in forces or elements deployed in the following international missions:

- United Nations
  - MINUSMA in Mali (2 personnel)
  - MINUSCA in the Central African Republic (215 personnel and 45 vehicles)
  - United Nations Verification Mission (2 personnel)
- European Union
  - Operation Poseidon in Greece (15 personnel and 3 vehicles)
  - Operação Indalo - Frontex 223 (17 personnel and 1 vessel)
  - EU Navfor Med in the Mediterranean (4 personnel)
  - Operation Atalanta in the Indian Ocean (10 personnel)
  - EUTM-Mali in Mali (4 personnel)
  - EUTM-Somalia in Mogadishu, Somalia (2 personnel)
  - EUTM Central African Republic in the Central African Republic (31 personnel)
  - Insurgency in Cabo Delgado in Mozambique (65 personnel)
  - Takuba Task Force (77 personnel)
- NATO
  - Baltic Air Policing (82 personnel and 4 General Dynamics F-16 Fighting Falcon)
  - Very High-Readiness Joint Task Force Maritime (VJTF) in Baltic Sea (168 personnel and 1 frigate)
  - Enhanced Vigilance Activity in Romania (235 personnel and 46 vehicles)
  - Tailored Forward Presence in Romania (221 personnel)
  - NATO Assurance Measures in Lithuania (146 personnel)
  - Enhanced Vigilance Activities in Slovakia (24 personnel and 5 Leopard 2 A6)
  - Operation Active Endeavour in the Mediterranean
  - Operation Sea Guardian in the Mediterranean Sea (52 personnel and 1 vessel)
  - Standing NATO Maritime Group 1 (196 personnel)
- Multilateral
  - Combined Joint Task Force – Operation Inherent Resolve in Iraq
  - EUROMARFOR in Mediterranean Sea
  - Operation Gallant Phoenix in Jordan

=== Exercises ===
Some of the exercises organized by the Portuguese Armed Forces annually are:

- Exercise Açor is the responsibility of the Azores Military Zone and is part of the joint operational exercises and training program of the Armed Forces, with the objective of evaluating the readiness of the National Forces System.
- Exercise Celulex is an exercise that aims to contribute to the maintenance of the technical skills of the Army's Radiological Defense Element.
- Exercise Contex Phibex is a naval and amphibious exercise that aims to improve the proficiency of the Portuguese Navy fleet and marines.
- Exercise Lusitano aimed to assess and certify the military operational capability, providing training, qualification and apron for the participating military.
- Exercise Orion is hosted each year by Portugal, with participation by the armed forces of Spain and the United States. Troops practice responding to crises such as the evacuation of non-combatants.
- Exercise Real Thaw is an annual military exercise organized and hosted by the Portuguese Air Force with the participation of forces from the Army and Navy and foreign military forces.
- Exercise REP(MUS) is an annual exercise organized by the Portuguese Navy and NATO with the participation foreign military forces, universities and tech companies.
- Exercise Strong Impact is an exercise focused on real field artillery fire.
- Exercise Swordfish objective is to improve the squadron's proficiency in conducting naval operations.
- Exercise Zarco aimed to test the security plans of the Commands and Military Units based in the Madeira Archipelago and to test the Armed Forces responses to cyberattacks, in the face of threats or aggression.

== History ==
=== Background ===
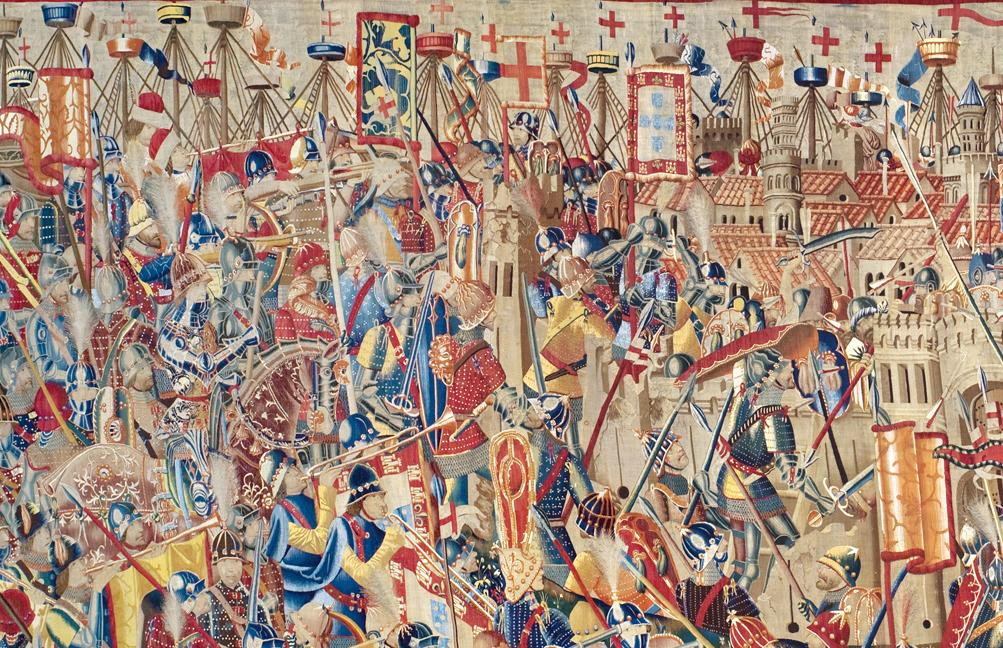
Portuguese naval and land forces in the Conquest of Asilah, 15th century

The history of the Portuguese military itself begins in the 12th century with the creation of the Kingdom of Portugal. Since the early beginning, the Kingdom had naval and ground forces. The Portuguese Navy exists as a permanent force since 1317, however non-permanent naval forces existed already before, with their first known naval engagement occurring in 1180. The Portuguese ground forces were established as a standing army in 1570, however they had existed since the 12th century, as the non-permanent hoste. The Navy and the Army would remain independent from each other for hundreds of years.

By the early 20th century, some joint military and national defense bodies had been created but these had mostly mere political coordination responsibilities. The administration of the several forces of the military remained in charge of separate government departments, respectively the Navy Ministry for the Navy (Marinha), the War Ministry for the Metropolitan Army (Exército Metropolitano) and the Colonies Ministry for the Colonial Military Forces (Forças Militares Coloniais). Operationally, the service branches were also completely independent from each other, with totally separated chains of command.

During the 1930s, plans were laid to merge all of the previously mentioned ministries under a single defense ministry. However, the service branches lobbies for the maintenance of their autonomy – represented by their separate government departments – politically opposed and were able to block this reorganization for the next couple of decades.

Nevertheless, the need to defend the Overseas Empire against possible foreign aggression during World War II, did lead to a significant step being taken during this period for an increased integration of the several military services, when the Colonial Military Forces were placed under the dependency of the War Ministry, which then became in charge of all Portuguese ground forces (metropolitan and colonial).

=== Establishment of the unified Armed Forces ===
Lessons learned from World War II, the start of the Cold War and the creation of NATO (which Portugal integrated as a founding member) partially ended the objections for the creation of a joint command for the military forces. In 1950, the roles of Minister of National Defense and of Chief of the General Staff of the Armed Forces (CEMGFA) are created. To the CEMGFA were given almost all the responsibilities until then assigned to the majors-generals of the Navy and of the Army (service branches military commanders), whose roles were at the same time extinct. This can be considered the beginning of the existence of the Portuguese Armed Forces as an unified organization.

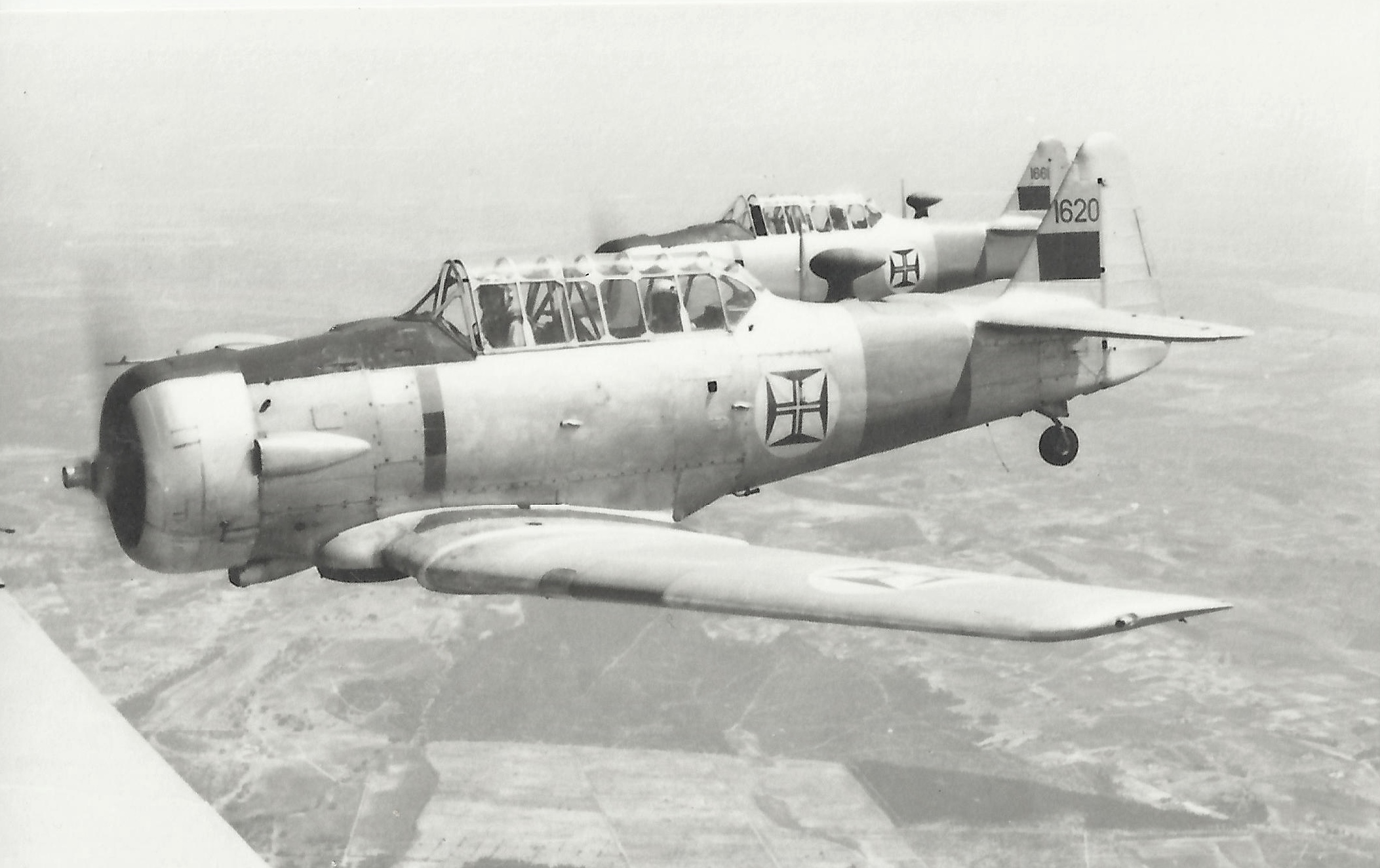
Training of pilots of the Portuguese Armed Forces in the early 1960s, in T-6 aircraft

However, opposition from both of the then existing military branches prevented the formation of a single ministry for the military. The political solution for this was to keep the existing Navy and Army ministries and to create the role of Minister of National Defense but without its own ministry, instead integrating the Government's Presidency Office. The Minister of National Defense directed an umbrella organization, named the National Defense Department which included the CEMGFA, the General Secretariat of National Defense (SGDN, Secretariado-Geral da Defesa Nacional) and the Under-Secretariat of State of the Aeronautics (Subsecretariado de Estado da Aeronáutica). As the Navy and Army ministers continued to exist and to administer their own branches, the Minister of Defense had merely coordinating roles regarding the Navy and the Army. The SGDN served as the Defense staff support organization, being headed by the CEMGFA. It was foreseen to be remodeled in order to be transformed in the general staff and joint management body of the Armed Forces, but this transformation would only occur in 1974, when the SGDN became the General Staff of the Armed Forces (EMGFA).

Despite all the challenges, the operational integration of the Armed Forces rapidly progressed in the 1950s. As part of this integration, the role of commander-in-chief was established in each of the Overseas territories, as a permanent unified commander of the local forces of the three branches. Mainly during the Overseas War, these commanders-in-chief would assume increasing responsibilities, until achieving full operational command of all forces assigned to their theater of operations, leaving the territorial service branch leadership with mere logistical responsibilities.

The Military Aeronautics (Army aviation branch) – which already had a high degree of autonomy since 1937 – becomes an entirely separate branch of service of the Armed Forces in 1952, at the same time starting to control the Portuguese Naval Aviation (Navy aviation service). This third branch of the Armed Forces would soon become officially designated "Portuguese Air Force" (Força Aérea Portuguesa), with the fully integration of the previous Naval Aviation becoming complete in 1958. Unlike the other services which had their own separate ministries, the Air Force was under the fully dependency of the Minister of National Defense via the Under-Secretariat of State of the Aeronautics. In 1961, the status of this department would be upgraded, it becoming the Secretariat of State of the Aeronautics.

In 1953, the National Republican Guard ceased policing the military, with the establishment of the Military Police by the Army. Later, the other service branches would create their respective military police type forces: the Air Police for the Air Force and the Naval Police for the Navy.

=== Overseas conflicts ===
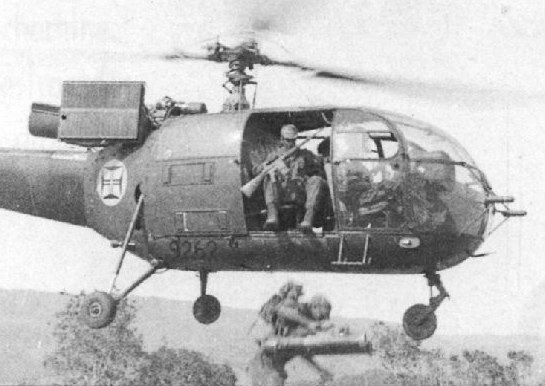
Portuguese paratroopers jump from an Alouette III helicopter in an air-mobile assault in Angola, in the early stages of the Overseas Wars

Between 1961 and 1974, the Portuguese Armed Forces would be engaged against emerging nationalist movements in several of the Portuguese African provinces. These set of conflicts are collectively referred as the Overseas War in Portugal. In the scope of the Cold War, it was a decisive ideological struggle and armed conflict in African (Portuguese Africa and surrounding nations) and Portuguese European mainland scenarios. Unlike other European nations, the Portuguese regime did not leave its African overseas provinces during the 1950s and 1960s. Several armed independence movements, most prominently led by communist parties who cooperated under the CONCP umbrella and pro US groups became active in these areas (especially in Angola, Mozambique and Portuguese Guinea).

The Portuguese Armed Forces were able to maintain a large military campaign for 13 years, in these three different theaters of operations, thousands of kilometers apart from each other and from the European mainland. This was achieved with almost no external support, in contrast with the nationalist movements which were backed by communist countries and even by some western ones. The Army suffered the majority of the casualties with 8290 soldiers killed in action while the Air Force lost 346 airmen and the Navy lost 195 sailors.

During the conflict, in each theater of operations, the operational command of the forces of the navy, army and air force was successively transferred from each territorial service branch command to joint commands, led by the Commander-in-Chief of the Armed Forces in that specific theater. Thus the three branches of the military were able to achieve a high level of operational integration, allowing for an effective cooperation between them, the optimization of their scarce assets and the ability to fight as a single cohesive force. The logistics side however was not able to reach such high levels of integration, mainly because each service branch continued to be administered by its own government department with its own supply chain and different standards.

Due to the nature of the conflict, commando-type forces achieved great importance. With the war's evolution, these assumed almost all of the mobile and offensive operations, with the more conventional forces remaining responsible mainly for the defensive assignments. By 1961, each service branch had created its own light infantry force oriented for asymmetric warfare. The Air Force created the Parachute Rifles (Caçadores Páraquedistas) in 1956, the Army first raised the Special Rifles (Caçadores Especiais) in 1960 which were later replaced by the Commandos (Comandos) in 1962 and the Navy deployed the Marines (Fuzileiros), a force reactivated in 1961. The Portuguese military also included a number of paramilitary forces, including the Special Groups (Grupos Especiais) and the Arrows (Flechas).

The Portuguese Armed Forces were also involved in a brief conventional armed conflict with the Indian military, when the latter invaded the Portuguese India in December 1961. Facing overwhelmingly superior forces and after 36 hours of combat, the Portuguese India Commander-in-Chief, General Vassalo e Silva, surrendered to the Indian Armed Forces. Portuguese forces suffered 30 dead and 57 wounded, with almost 3500 personnel being taken as prisoners of war, these being released six months later. The Indian Armed Forces officially recognize 76 Indian casualties during the invasion.

=== Democratic Republic ===
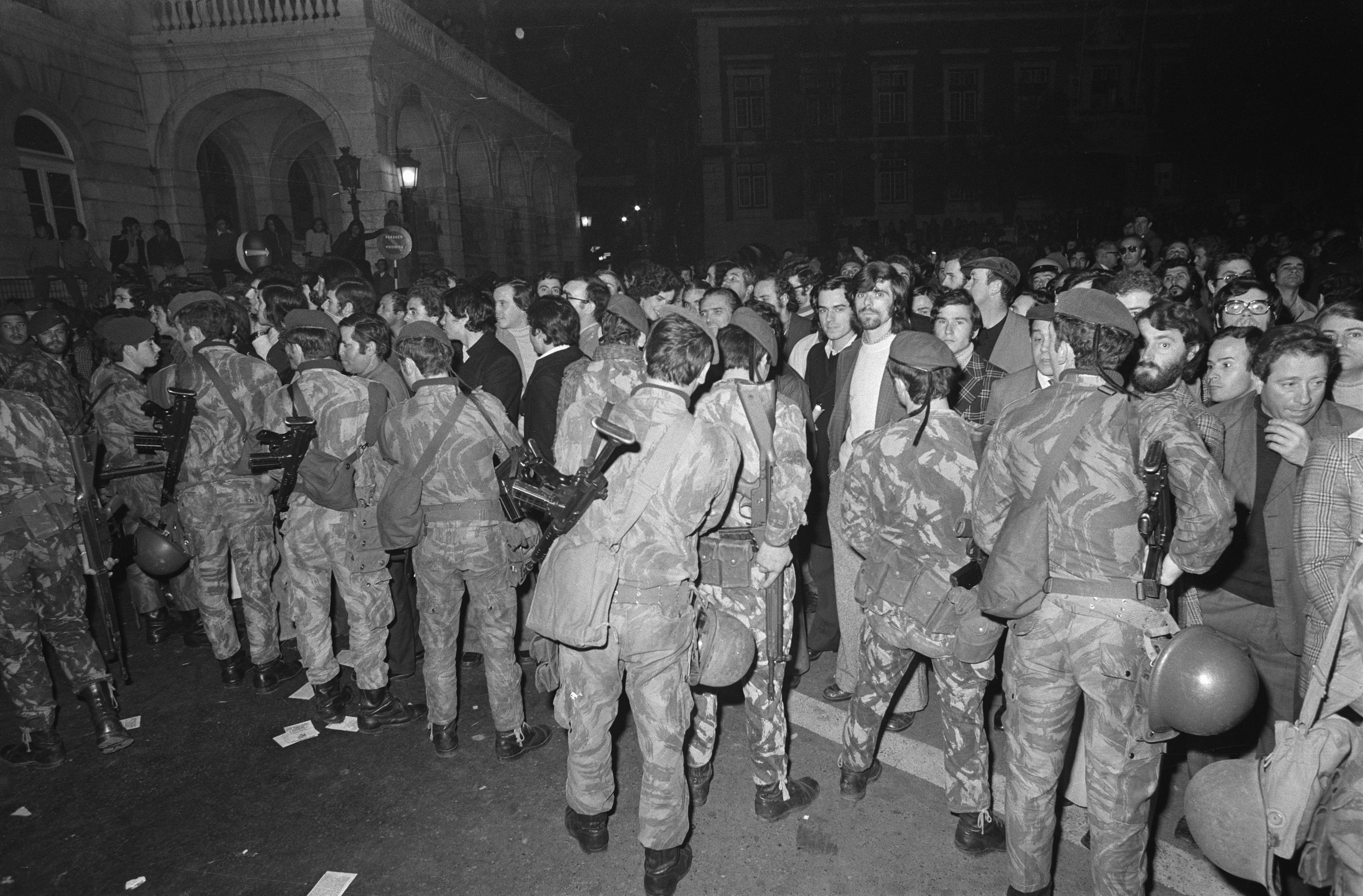
Portuguese military in public order duty during a Maoist demonstration at the Rossio Square, Lisbon, in the troubled period which followed the Carnation Revolution

On the morning of 25 April 1974, the Armed Forces Movement (MFA, Movimento das Forças Armadas) – consisting mostly of junior officers of the three service branches – launched a coup d'état, known as the Carnation Revolution, which would bring an end to the New State regime and shortly the Overseas War. While the revolt included several military units located on the mainland, the forces that departed from the Cavalry School located in Santarém, led by captain Salgueiro Maia, were the ones that managed to obtain the surrender of prime-minister Marcelo Caetano after a stand-off at the National Republican Guard headquarters in Lisbon, where he and some other members of the Government had taken refuge.

However, after the revolution and for about a year and a half, the Portuguese military would become highly politicized and split into several factions. By the summer of 1975, the tension between these was so high, that the country was on the verge of civil war. The forces connected to the extreme left-wing launched a further coup d'état on 25 November but the Group of Nine, a moderate military faction, immediately initiated a counter-coup. The main episode of this confrontation was the successful assault on the barracks of the left-wing dominated Military Police Regiment by the moderate forces of the Commando Regiment, resulting in three soldiers killed in action. The Group of Nine emerged victorious, thus preventing the establishment of a communist state in Portugal and ending the period of political instability in the country.

The Ministry of National Defense would be created during this period of instability. However this ministry had no power over the Armed Forces, his role was simply to act as a connection between the military and the Government. It was the Revolution Council – created in 1975, consisting only of military officers and chaired by the President of the Republic – that had the full control over the Armed Forces, which meant these were completely independent from the civilian administration. The Government military departments (Navy Ministry, Army Ministry and Secretariat of State of the Aeronautics) were disbanded, with each service branch chief of staff assuming the roles of the former ministers, under the coordination of the CEMGFA, to whom was given a status equivalent to that of the Prime Minister of Portugal. This organization would remain in place until 1982, when the Revolution Council was disbanded after the first revision to the 1976 Constitution. The Armed Forces were again placed under the subordination of the civilian administration, more specifically being integrated in the Ministry of National Defense.

With the decolonization and the end of the Overseas War, the Portuguese military would change from an asymmetric war oriented force to a conventional war oriented force, focused in defense of Western Europe from a possible Soviet invasion.

Meanwhile, the 1980s would see the creation of special operations, namely the Army's Special Operations Forces and the Navy's Special Actions Detachment. In 1990, the Air Force would create Combat Rescue teams (Resgate em Combate or RESCOM) for CSAR operations but in 2006 these were extinct and replaced by the Force Protection Unit (Unidade de Protecção da Força or UPF) whose mission is to provide security for the Air Force elements deployed on international missions.

=== Current ===
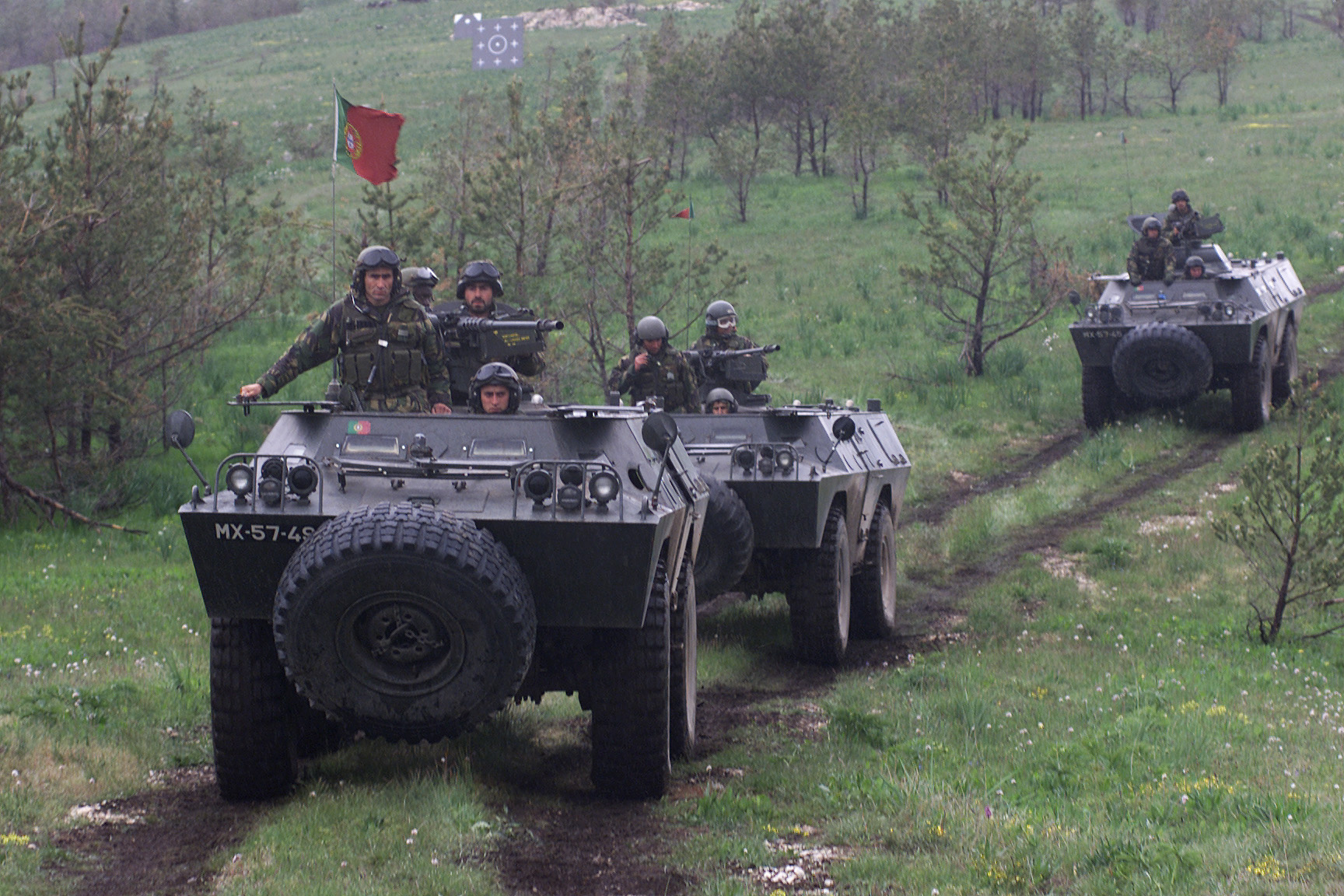
Portuguese National Deployed Force in Bosnia in 2002

The collapse of the Soviet Union and the Warsaw Pact triggered a deep transformation of the Armed Forces. They transitioned from being a conscription based and defensive oriented Armed Forces to gradually becoming a fully professional and expeditionary warfare oriented force, starting to participate in international missions, most of them under the mandate of the United Nations, the European Union and the NATO, besides organizing some unilateral missions abroad on their own.

Conscription was gradually reduced since the early 1990s, with almost no conscripts serving the Armed Forces by the end of that decade. The formal abolition of the conscription in time of peace for all men however, was only implemented in 2004.

In 1993, the Portuguese Army deployed a communications battalion to Mozambique, as part of the UNOMOZ, this being the first participation of the Portuguese Armed Forces in international missions, with a complete military unit. After Mozambique, the Portuguese Military deployed forces to international missions in a number of countries, including Angola, Bosnia and Herzegovina, Timor-Leste, Kosovo, Lebanon, Afghanistan and Lithuania, besides deploying military observers and other individual elements to other countries. Recent Defense policy confirmed the assumption that most considerable operations would be undertaken under international organizations mandates, with Portugal not entering alone in a major military engagement since the 1961–1974 overseas conflict.

Nonetheless, the Portuguese Military have also conducted a number of unilateral and independent peace-enforcing and humanitarian military missions, namely in Guinea-Bissau (1990, 1998, and 1999) and in Angola (1992). The Operation Crocodile conducted in Guinea-Bissau in 1998 was notable, by evidencing the capacity of the Portuguese Armed Forces – despite its small size and limitation of means – to rapidly mount a military operation abroad in a scale that is typically only achievable by major military powers. This operations was mainly aimed at the rescuing of thousands of Portuguese and other foreign nationals caught in the middle of the civil conflict that erupted in Guinea-Bissau and included the deployment of naval and air forces, the landing and occupation of the Port of Bissau by Portuguese Marines, amphibious and helicopter landings in several places of the Guinean coast for the rescuing of civilians, medical and humanitarian aid to the civil population and the support to the peace talks between the two antagonizing parties.

A Military Program Law (Lei de Programação Militar) was launched in 2002 to start the complete modernization of the Armed Forces. Considerable re-equipment of the military started in 2003, led by Defense Minister Paulo Portas, who managed to launch a series of re-equipment programs, including those of new submarines (Tridente-class), frigates (Bartolomeu Dias-class) and off shore patrol ships (Project NPO 2000 / Viana do Castelo class) for the Navy, of armored vehicles (Pandur) for the Army and of heavy helicopters (EH-101) for the Air Force. Ironically one of the most basic challenges – the replacement of the 7.62×51mm battle rifles by 5.56×45mm assault rifles – failed during his mandate due to the soldiers clinging onto their cheap and highly reliable locally made FBP G3.

Some important re-equipment programs were however later canceled or suspended mainly due to cuts in the Defense budget, including the building of a multipurpose amphibious ship (Project NavPoL), the building of coastal patrol ships (Project NPC 2000) and the acquisition of helicopters (EC635 and NH90) for the Army Light Aviation Unit. Another important challenge faced, in terms of equipment, is the lack of funds for the replacement of the Alouette III helicopters and the Alpha Jet advanced trainer jets of the Air Force, which, if not addressed in due course, may compromise the future capacity of the Armed Forces to continue to do the complete training of their own aircraft pilots.

Despite the financial cuts in Defense, all international missions assigned to the Portuguese military have been fulfilled without limitations.

Recently purchased equipment include new main battle tanks (Leopard 2A6) in 2008 and new coastal patrol vessels (Tejo-class) in 2014. The process acquisition of the ex-French amphibious assault ship Siroco – as an alternative to the suspended NavPoL – failed in 2015, with the Portuguese Armed Forces continuing not having an asset which allows them to easily deploy forces to abroad on a larger scale, enhancing its expeditionary capacity.

In the 2010s, the Portuguese Armed Forces created the Immediate Reaction Force (FRI, Força de Reação Imediata), aimed at providing an autonomous national response capability to intervene abroad in complex situations to conduct operations as the possible of evacuation of Portuguese citizens from countries under crisis or tension. The FRI includes naval, ground, air and special operations components. Its initial core has an operational readiness of 48 hours and has permanently assigned assets of the three branches of the Armed Forces.

=== Future ===
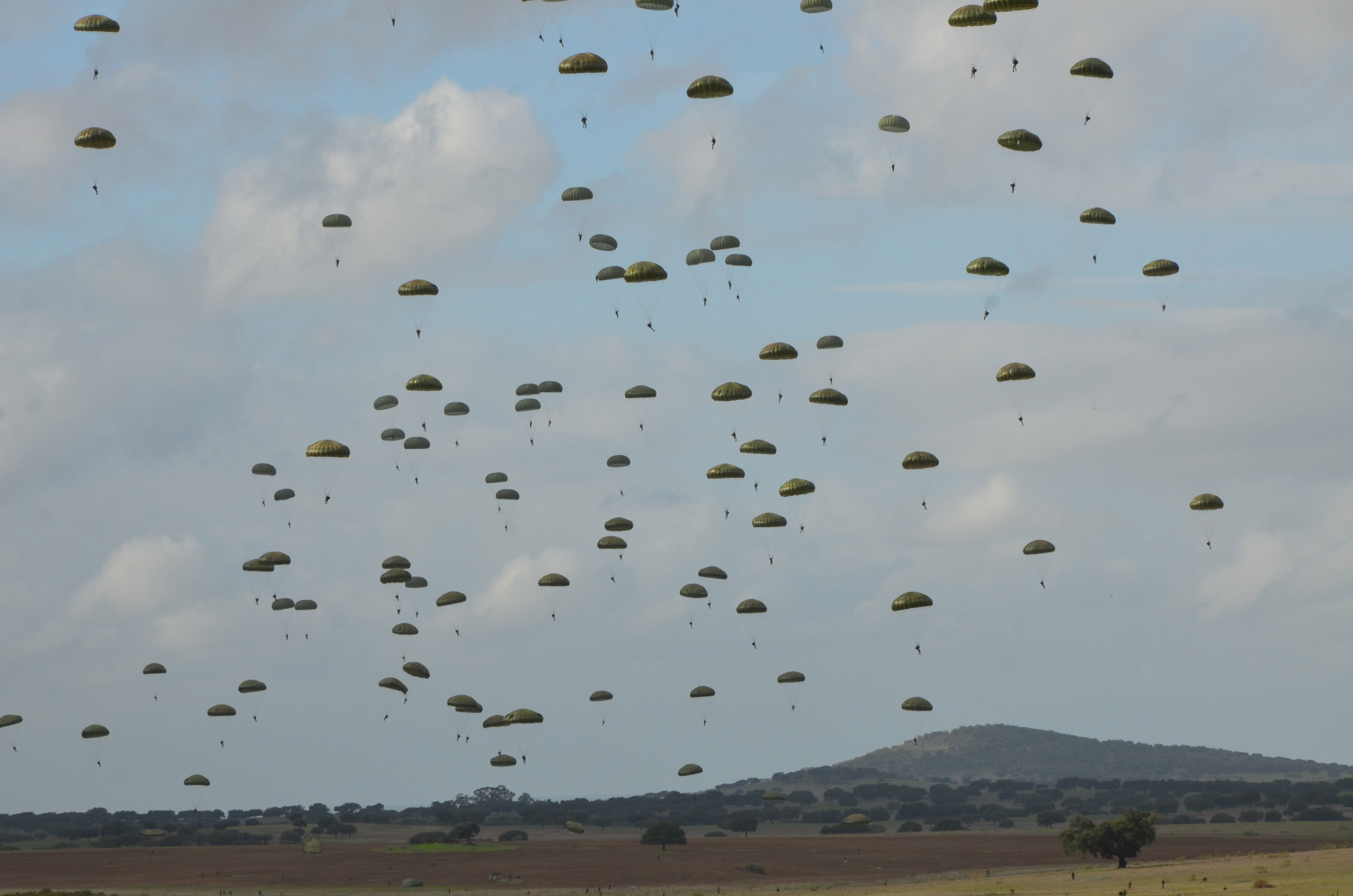
Mass drop of Portuguese paratroopers in an exercise. Paratroopers will continue to be an important component of the Portuguese Immediate Reaction Force (FRI)

In April 2013, the Portuguese Government approved a structural reform of the National Defense, named Defesa 2020 ("Defense 2020"). It was done with the objective of defining the level of ambition of the Armed Forces by establishing the guidance parameters for strategic planning, reinforcing the leading responsibility of the Chief of the General Staff of the Armed Forces in the execution of the approved military strategy, reducing human resources while at the same time improving their management and enhancing the coordination between the General Staff of the Armed Forces, the branches of the Armed Forces and the Ministry of National Defense.

Defesa 2020 establishes the existence of three sets of force:

- Immediate Reaction Force (FRI, Força de Reação Imediata) – a rapid action force, focused in missions such as the evacuation of Portuguese citizens in crisis or conflict areas and response in national complex emergency situations.
- Permanent Forces in Sovereignty Action (FPAS, Forças Permanentes em Ação de Soberania) – forces focused in the continuous missions of national sovereignty or jurisdiction areas of national responsibility, including the air defense, the maritime and aerial patrolling, surveillance and inspection, land surveillance when required, search and rescue and finally the nuclear, biological, chemical and radiological defense, public interest and disaster response.
- Modular Set of Forces (CMF, Conjunto Modular de Forças) – forces assigned to Portuguese international commitments deployed for periods of six months, capable of engaging in three simultaneous minor operations or in a single major operation. These forces are known as National Deployed Forces (FND, Forças Nacionais Destacadas).

Future equipment programs are also in course. In May 2019, a new Military Programming Law was published, which will regulate the founding of the military investments programs until 2030. Some of the main next military investments present in this document are:

- Portuguese Air Force
  - 5 Embraer KC-390 military transport aircraft. The KC-390 incorporates an important percentage of Portuguese developed technology and is being partially built in Portugal;
  - 6 Lockheed P-3C Orion Cup;
  - Ground attack aircraft for close air support;
  - 9 Sikorsky UH-60 Black Hawk for aerial firefighting;
  - 2 additional AgustaWestland AW119 Koala;
  - Replacement of the Chipmunk Mk.20 training aircraft fleet;
  - Modernization of the Socata TB 30 Epsilon, Falcon 50, C130 Hercules and P3C Cup + Orion fleets;
  - AIM-9X Sidewinder missiles and Warning Receiver SPS-45(V)5 systems for the General Dynamics F-16 Fighting Falcon fleet.
  - Surveillance Unmanned aerial vehicles (Class 2 - above 150 kg and Class 3 - above 600 kg);
- Portuguese Navy
  - 1 amphibious transport dock vessel – locally known has Navio Polivalente Logístico (NPL);
  - 1 landing platform - to operate unmanned aerial vehicles and unmanned underwater vehicles;
  - 2 replenishment oiler – to replace Berrio-class fleet tanker;
  - 6 Viana do Castelo-class patrol vessels;
  - New Coastal Patrol Vessels to replace the Argos, Centauro and Tejo class patrol vessels.
- Portuguese Army
  - 5 Tactical evacuation helicopters;
  - 47 armored tactical communications vehicles;
  - 61 armored military cargo trucks;
  - Anti-aircraft defense systems which include 8 weapon terminals, 2 local warning radars, 8 light missile systems integrated into armored vehicles and 8 light armored or medium armored tactical vehicles;
  - Around 200 Joint Light Tactical Vehicles;
  - New Unmanned aerial vehicles;
  - Anti-tank guided weapons.

== Organization ==
=== General Staff of the Armed Forces ===
The General Staff of the Armed Forces (EMGFA, Estado-Maior-General das Forças Armadas) is the superior military body and supreme headquarters of the Portuguese Armed Forces. It is responsible for planning, directing and controlling the usage of the three service branches in their fulfillment of assigned missions and tasks. The EMGFA is headed by the Chief of the General Staff of the Armed Forces and includes:

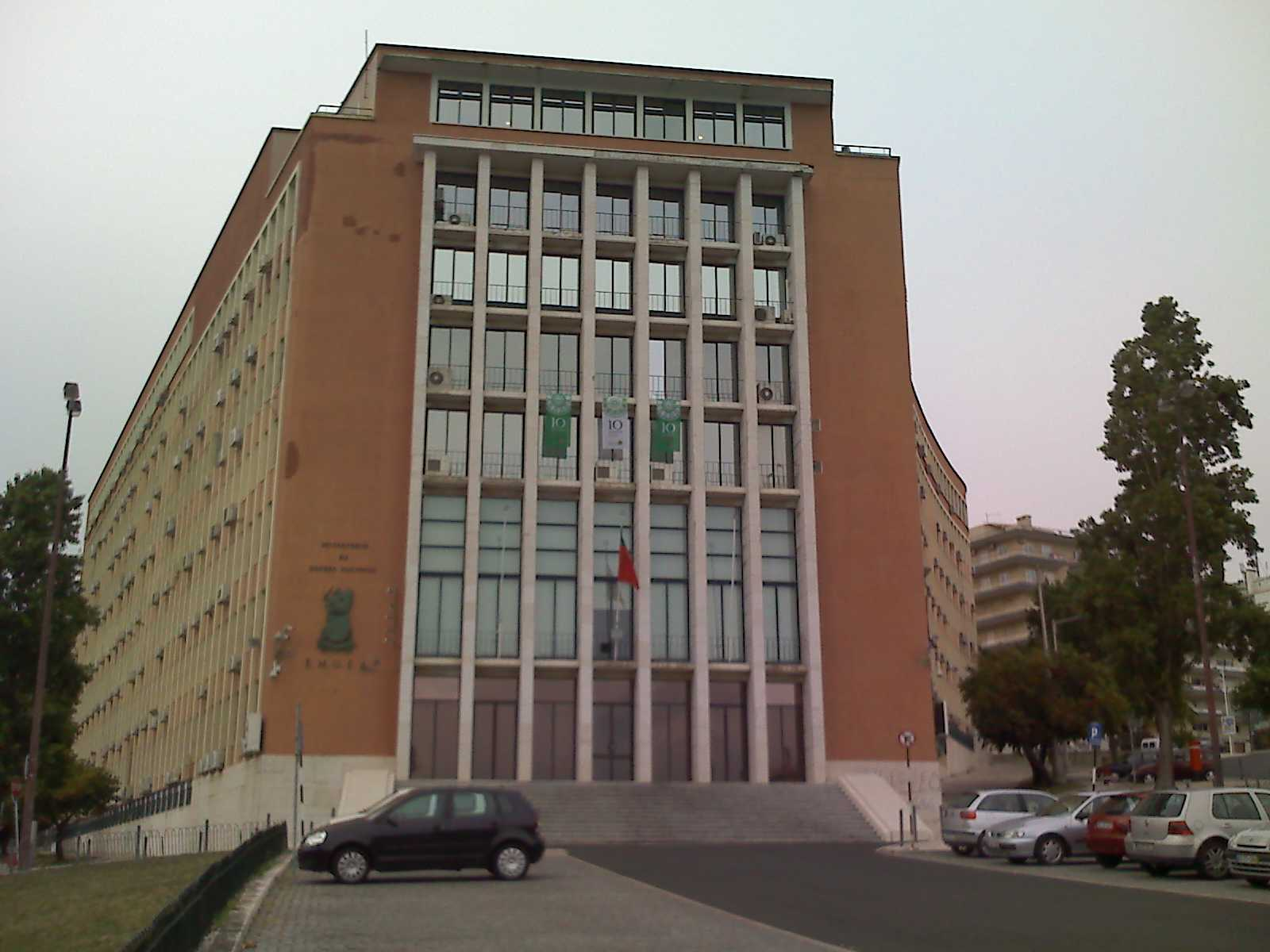
Headquarters building of the EMGFA and of Ministry of National Defence, in Lisbon

- Deputy for the Planning and Coordination
- Joint Command for the Military Operations
- Azores Operational Command
- Madeira Operational Command
- Military Strategic Planning Division
- Resources Division
- Directorate of Communications and Information Systems
- Military Security and Intelligence Center (CISMIL)
- Directorate of Military Health
- Directorate of Finance
- General Support Command

The EMGFA also has under its dependency the following bodies:

- Military University Institute
- Military missions abroad
- Hospital of the Armed Forces
- Military Health Teaching, Training and Investigation Unit

=== Chief of the General Staff of the Armed Forces ===
The Chief of the General Staff of the Armed Forces (CEMGFA, Chefe do Estado-Maior-General das Forças Armadas) is the principal military adviser of the Minister of National Defense and is the chief with the highest authority in the hierarchy of the Portuguese Armed Forces.

The CEMGFA is an admiral or a general (four star rank) of one of the branches of service, appointed by the President of the Republic by proposal of the Government. Before being proposed to the President, the nominee has to be presented by the Minister of National Defense to the Council of Chiefs of Staff for a previous hearing. If the nominee is refused by the President, the Government has to present another option. Traditionally, there is a rotation of the branch of service that provides the CEMGFA, but this is not mandatory and not always happens.

The CEMGFA is responsible for the planning and implementation of the operational military strategy, having under his hierarchic dependency the chiefs of staff of the branches of service for the matters that evolve the preparedness, the employment and the sustainment of the forces and assets of the operational component of the system of forces and responding before the Government – through the Minister of National Defense – for the military response capacity of the Armed Forces. He/she is the operational commander of the Armed Forces, being responsible for the employment of all forces and assets of the operational component of the system of forces in operational missions. The sustainment of the forces and assets referred before is under the branches of service responsibility, with the respective chiefs of staff being under the CEMGFA dependency for that.

The branch of service chief of staff who is longer in the function replaces the CEMGFA, in case of his absence or impediment.

=== Branches of the Armed Forces ===
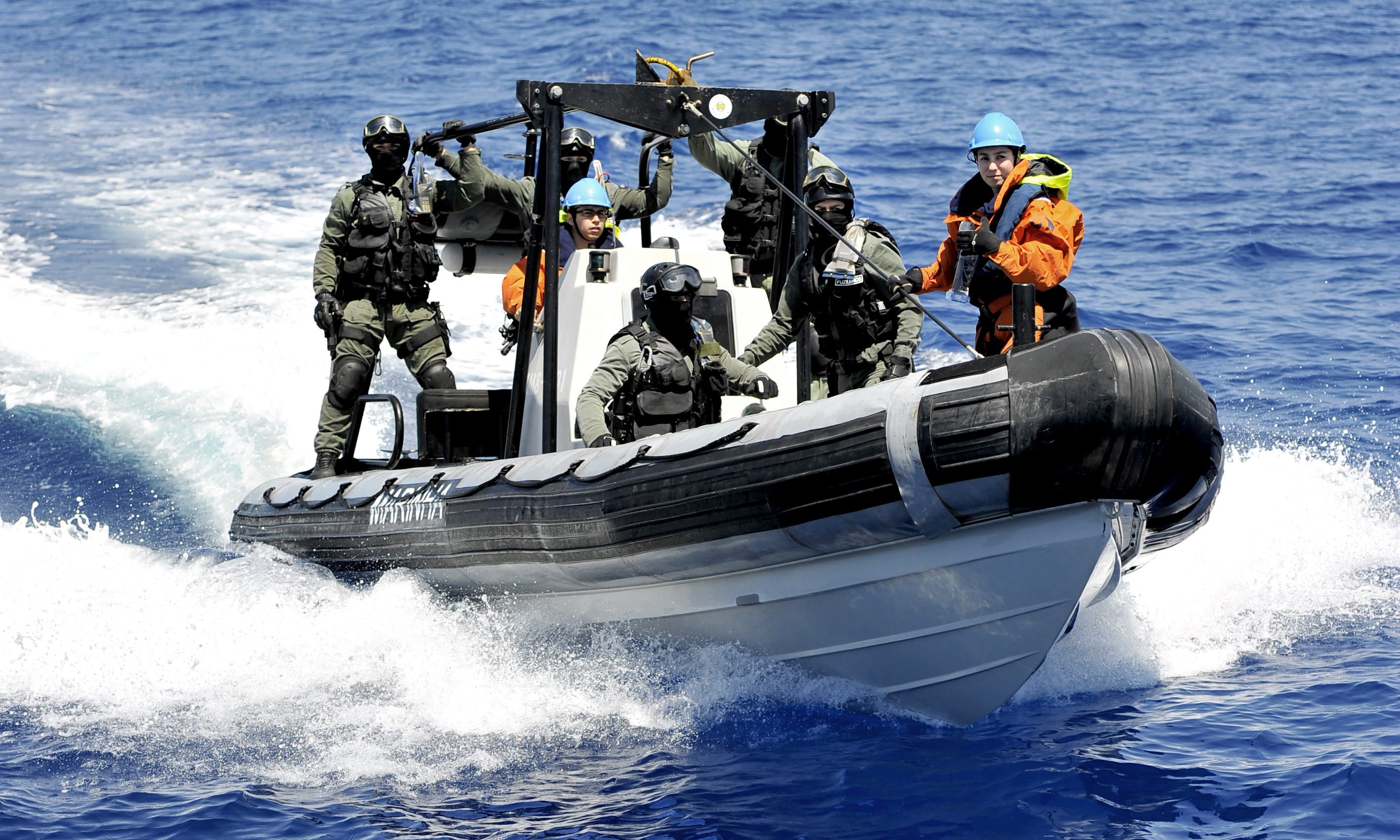
VBSS action carried by a boarding team of the frigate NRP Bartolomeu Dias of the Portuguese Navy

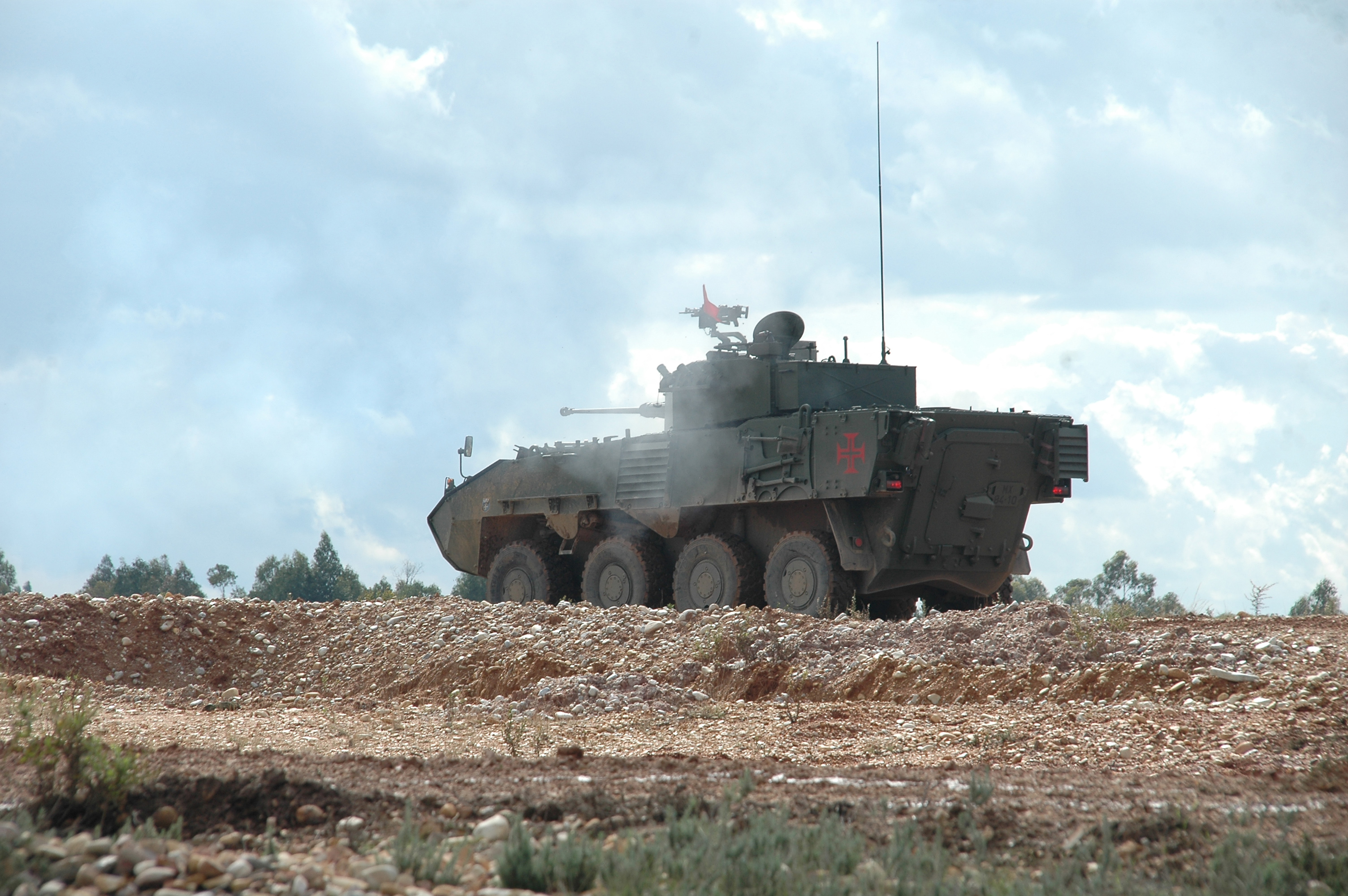
Pandur II 8x8 Wheeled Armoured Personnel Carrier during exercise Trident Juncture 15

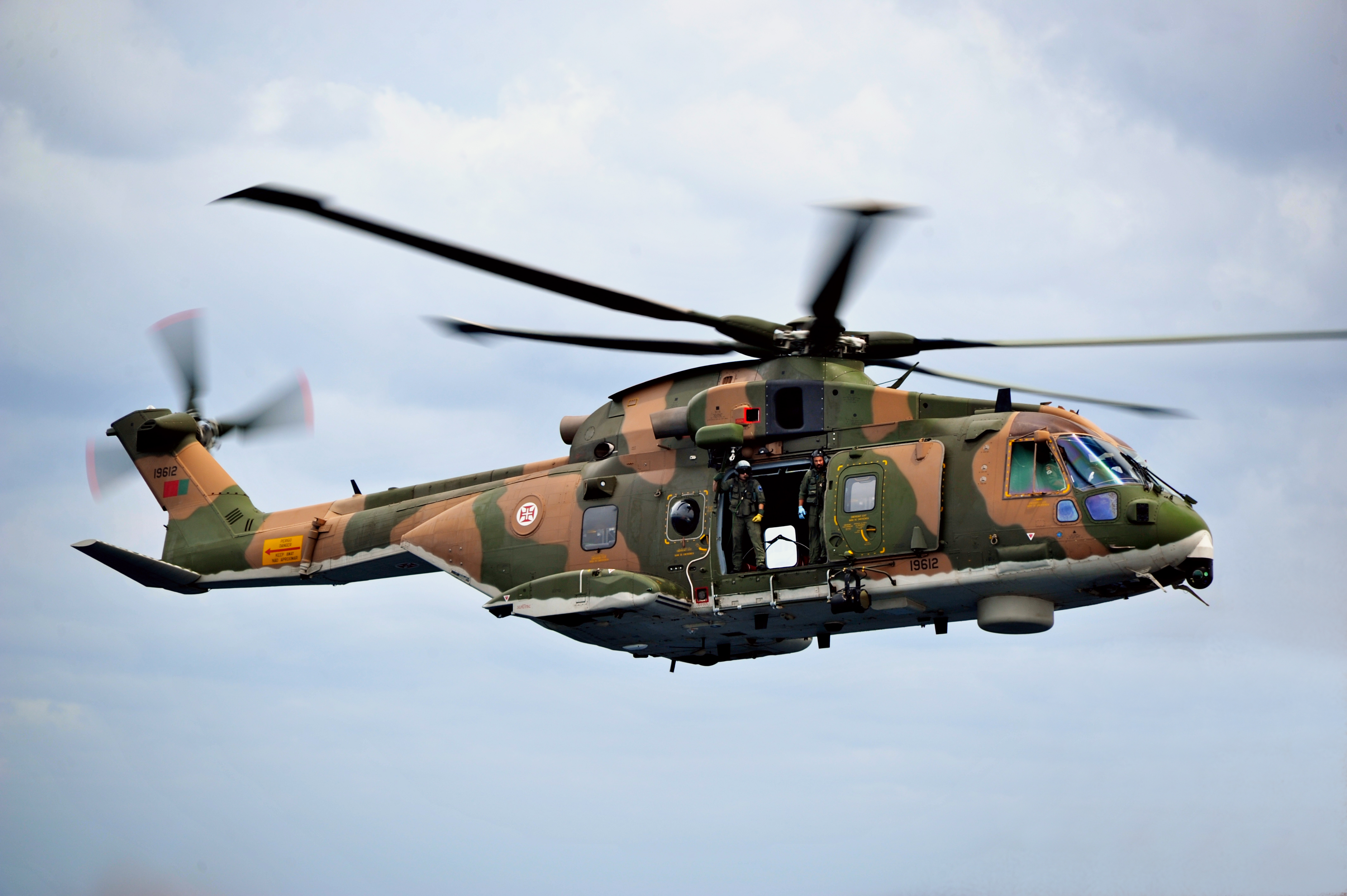
SAR operation performed by an EH101 helicopter of the Portuguese Air Force

The Portuguese Armed Forces include three branches, these being the Navy, the Army and the Air Force. Created centuries ago, the Navy and the Army are much older than the integrated Armed Forces themselves. The Air Force is however younger, being created as a separate branch already after the establishment of the integrated Armed Forces. The branches of service have as their principal mission to participate, in an integrated form, in the defense of the Republic, in the terms defined by the Constitution and the law, being mainly aimed for the generation, preparation and sustainment of the forces of the operational component of the system of forces. The branches also guarantee their own specific missions established by particular laws and also guarantee the operational missions given to them by the CEMGFA.

The increasing integration and standardization of the different branches of service meant that their organizations gradually approached. Presently, all the three branches have an identical organizational model that includes:

- a chief of staff
- a branch staff
- central bodies of administration and management
- a component command
- bodies of advisement
- bodies of inspection
- base bodies
- elements of the operational component of the system of forces

The chiefs of staff serve as the branch commanders. The staffs are the bodies for planning and decision support of the respective chiefs of staff, being able also to assume roles of management, control, advisement or inspection. The central bodies of administration and management have a functional character and are intended to guarantee the management and execution in specific fundamental areas and activities as the human, material, financial, information and infrastructures resources management. The component commands (naval, land and air) are intended to support the chiefs of staff in their command roles. The component commands can be put under the direct dependency of the CEMGFA for the exercise of his command roles. The bodies of advisement are intended to support the decision of the chiefs of staff in special and important matters regarding the preparedness, discipline and administration of the branch. The bodies of inspection are intended to support the control and evaluation function of the chiefs of staff. The base bodies are those aimed at the training, the sustainment and the general support of the branch. The elements of the operational component of the system of forces are the forces and assets of the branch intended for the accomplishment of the operational missions.

Besides the above referred standard bodies, the Navy also includes the Hydrographic Institute and the Maritime Search and Rescue Service, while the Air Force also includes the Air Search and Rescue Service.

Until recently, the Navy also included the National Maritime Authority. Statutorily, the Maritime Authority is now an entirely separate legal entity, but it continues to be headed by the Chief of Staff of the Navy and continues to be mainly administered, supported and staffed by the Navy. The same happens with the National Aeronautic Authority in relation to the Air Force, the difference being that this Authority was already created as a separate legal entity.

=== Chiefs of staff of the branches ===
The chiefs of staff of the Navy, of the Army and of the Air Force command their respective branches, being the military chiefs with the higher authority in each of the branches hierarchy and being the principal advisors of the Minister of National Defense and of the CEMGFA in all matters related with their branches. Inside each branch, the respective chief of staff is the only officer with a four-star rank (admiral in the Navy and general in the other two branches).

The chiefs of staff are part of the operational command structure of the Armed Forces, serving as deputy commanders of the CEMGFA. While they report to the CEMGFA in the operational, military intelligence and security, military higher learning, military health and other joint matters, they report directly to the Minister of National Defense in the matters related with the current management of their branches resources.

The chiefs of staff of the branches are appointed by the President of the Republic, by government proposal, in an analogous process of that of the CEMGFA appointment. The CEMGFA must be heard before a name is proposed to the President.

=== Military bodies of advisement ===
The military bodies of advisement of the armed forces are the Council of Chiefs of Staff and the higher councils of the several branches.

The Council of Chiefs of Staff is the principal military coordinating body, being also the body of advisement of the CEMGFA. It is presided over by the CEMGFA and also includes the chiefs of staff of the three branches of service. Other military entities may be invited to participate in their meetings, but without voting rights.

In each of the branches, there is a higher council presided by the respective chief of staff. These are the Council of the Admiralty, the Higher Council of the Army and the Higher Council of the Air Force. The branches may have other advisement bodies like the military careers councils (the councils of class in the Navy, the councils of arm or service in the Army and the councils of specialty in the Air Force).

== Branches of the armed forces ==
=== Navy ===
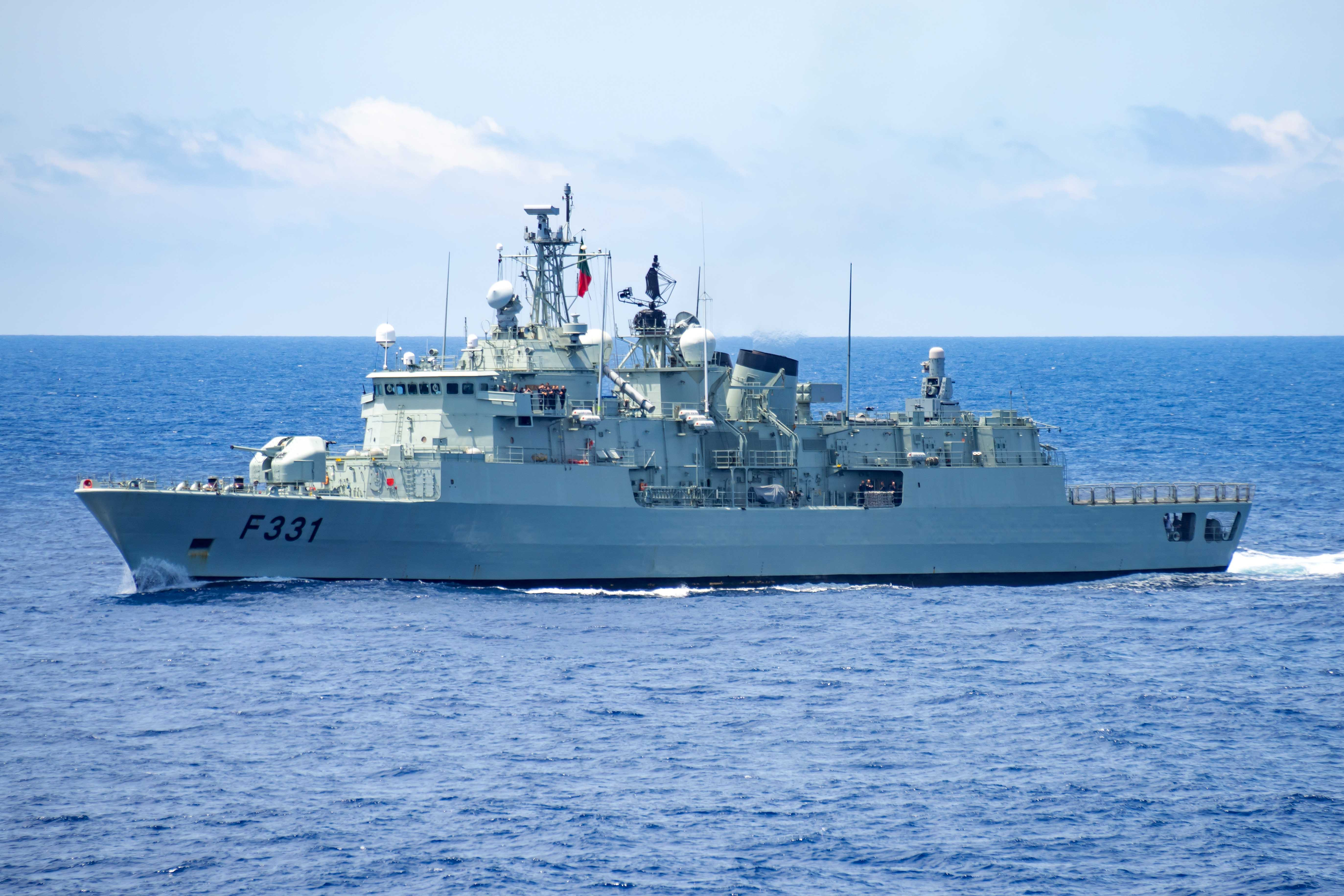
Portuguese Navy's frigate NRP Álvares Cabral

The Navy (Marinha, with its armed branch also being referred as the Armada) is the naval component of the Portuguese Armed Forces. It includes around 8000 military personnel (including around 1500 marines), 40 commissioned ships and 50 auxiliary vessels. Unlike the other service branches that have an almost purely military role, the Navy historically has had a wide scope of non-military activities, namely serving as the Portuguese maritime administration, and being responsible for the tutelage over of the merchant marine, fisheries, maritime authority and maritime research affairs. The responsibility over the non-military maritime activities has however been gradually transferred to other organizations since the disbandment of the Navy Ministry in 1974, with only a few – as the maritime authority and the hydrographic survey – remaining now under the Navy tutelage.

The Portuguese Navy is one of the oldest in the world, with its first known naval engagement occurring in 1180. A permanent Navy exists since 1317, when the role of Admiral of Portugal was created.

The Navy is headed by the Chief of Staff of the Navy and includes the Navy Staff, the Personnel, the Material, the Finance and the Information Technologies superintendences, the Naval Command (naval component command, with five subordinate maritime zone commands), the Council of the Admiralty and the Inspection-General of the Navy. The base bodies of the branch include the Lisbon Naval Base, the Support Unit of the Central Facilities of the Navy, the Naval School, the technical schools (Marines, Hydrography and Oceanography, Divers and Naval Technologies), the Integrated Center of Naval Training and Evaluation and the squadrons (Surface Ships, Submarines and Helicopters). The elements of the operational component of the system of forces of the Navy include the Marine Corps Command, the naval and marine forces, the operational naval, marine and divers assets and units, the command centers and posts and the operations support centers. The Navy includes the Marine Corps (Corpo de Fuzileiros), which is a naval infantry force that serves in the roles of naval force protection, amphibious force projection and maritime special operations. The Marines themselves include the Special Actions Detachment, which is the special operations unit of the Navy. The Sappers Divers Group is the combat divers unit of the Navy. The Navy further includes the Hydrographic Institute, the Maritime Search and Rescue Service and the International Maritime Law Commission.

=== Army ===
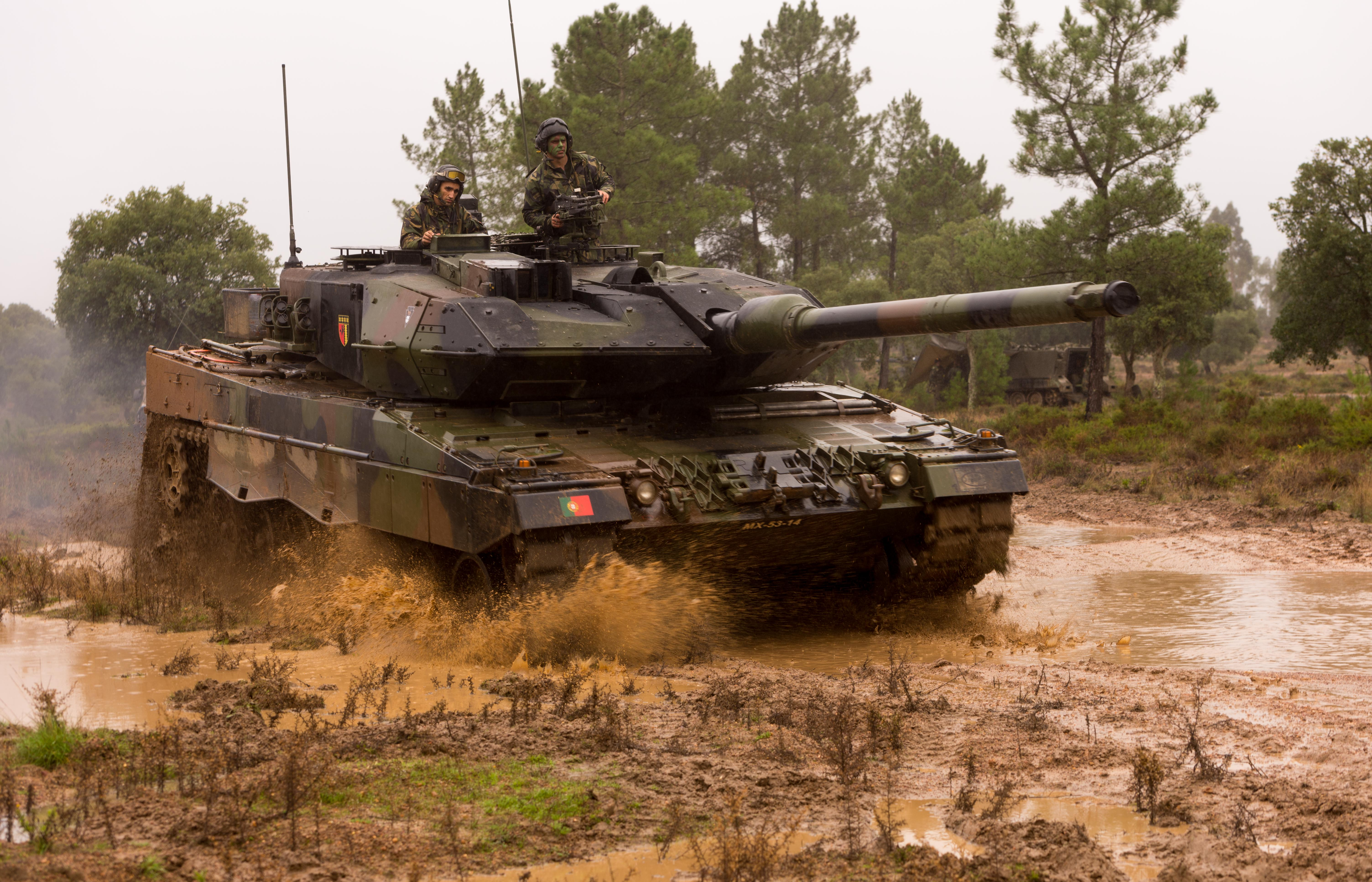
Portuguese Army's Leopard 2 A6 main battle tank

The Army (Exército) is the land component of the Portuguese Armed Forces and its larger branch. Presently, it includes around 14 000 military personnel. The principal equipment of the Army includes 37 main battle tanks (Leopard 2A6), 300 tracked APCs (M113), 188 wheeled APCs (Pandur II), 139 tactical vehicles (URO VAMTAC), 100 other armored vehicles and 80 field artillery weapons. In 2019, the FN SCAR assault rifle was chosen as the principal infantry weapon, gradually replacing the 7.62mm HK G3 and the several models of 5.56mm rifles used by paratroopers and other special troops.

The Portuguese Army can be considered one of the oldest armies of the world, with its origins going back to the Royal Hoste of the 12th century, in the early period of the Kingdom of Portugal. The foundations of a standing army were established in 1570, with the creation of the Ordenanças. In the middle of the 17th century, the Portuguese land forces started to be referred as the Exército.

The Army is headed by the Chief of Staff of the Army and includes the Army Staff, the Personnel and the Logistics commands, the Directorate of Finance, the Land Forces Command (land component command, with two subordinate military zone commands) and the Inspection-General of the Army. The base bodies of the branch are divided by the scopes of obtainment and administration of human resources (including psychology, recruiting and selection centers and offices), of readying of forces (including 21 regiments of several arms, the Special Operations Troops Centre and the Army Intelligence and Military Security Center), of logistical support (including the Army Geospatial Intelligence Center, two service support regiments, the Army Material General Support Unit and two health centers), of teaching and training (including the Military Academy, the School of the Arms, the School of the Services, the Army Sergeants School, the Military College and the Army Pupils Institute) and of divulgation and preservation of military culture (including military museums, archives, the Army Band and the Army Fanfare). The Army includes also bodies that support other branches of the Armed Forces, including the Military Prison Establishment, the Military Laboratorial Unit of Biological and Chemical Defense and the Military Unit of Veterinary Medicine. The elements of the operational component of the system of forces of the Army include the Land Forces Command, the formations and operational units commands, the military zones commands and the general support and emergency military support forces. The formations include the Rapid Reaction Brigade, the Mechanized Brigade and the Intervention Brigade. The special troops of the Army include the Paratroopers, the Commandos and the Special Operations Troops, whose units are now all integrated in the Rapid Reaction Brigade.

Traditionally, the Army used to be divided in branches that were designated "arms" if they had a mainly combatant role and designated "services" if their role was logistical. The main branches were the arms of cavalry, infantry, artillery, engineering and communications and the services of health, military administration, materiel and transportation. Each branch constituted an organization that usually included a branch directorate, a branch school, units and a cadre of personnel. As organizations, these branches were abolished in 1993, but they still exist as occupational groups. Also, most of the Army units continue to be associated to a branch, which in most cases correspond to the main role of the respective unit.

=== Air Force ===
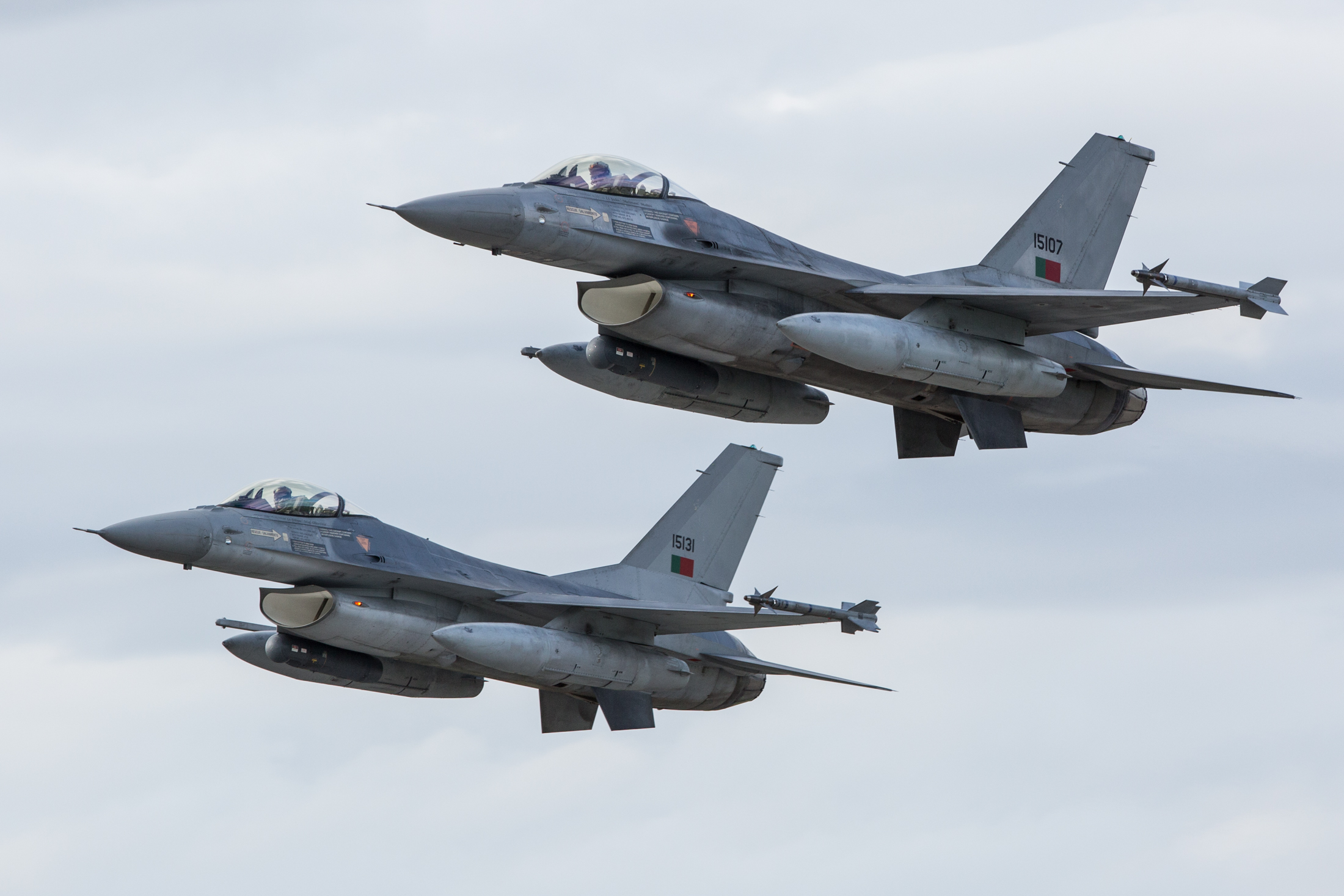
Portuguese Air Force's F-16 fighters

The Air Force (Força Aérea) is the air component of the Portuguese Armed Forces and its younger branch. It includes around 6000 personnel and 100 aircraft.

The Portuguese Air Force was established as an independent branch of service in 1952, when the Military Aeronautics arm was completely separated from the Army, at the same time starting to control the Naval Aviation that was part of the Navy.

The Air Force is headed by the Chief of Staff of the Air Force and includes the Air Force Staff, the Air Force Personnel and the Air Force Logistics commands, the Air Force Directorate of Finance, the Air Command (air component command, with two subordinate air zone commands) and the Inspection-General of the Air Force. The base bodies of the branch include the Air Force Academy, the Military and Technical Training Center of the Air Force, five air bases, two maneuver aerodromes, a transit aerodrome and four radar stations. The elements of the operational component of the system of forces of the Air Force include the operational planning bodies, the Air Command and Control System, the flying units and the anti-aircraft intervention units. The flying units include two training squadrons (TB 30 Epsilon), one fighter squadron (F-16 AM), one attack squadron (F-16 AM), three transport squadrons (C-130, C-295M, Falcon 900 and Falcon 50), two helicopter squadrons (EH-101 and AW119), two maritime patrol squadron (Lockheed P-3C and C-295M Persuader) and one Air Force Academy squadron (ASK-21, OGMA Chipmunk Mk 20 (modif) and L-23 Super Blaník). The Polícia Aérea (Air Police) is the ground combat force of the Air Force, which serves as its military police, force protection and ground anti-aircraft defense element, including a special forces unit, this being the Tactical Operations of Protection Core (NOTP).

== The National Republican Guard ==
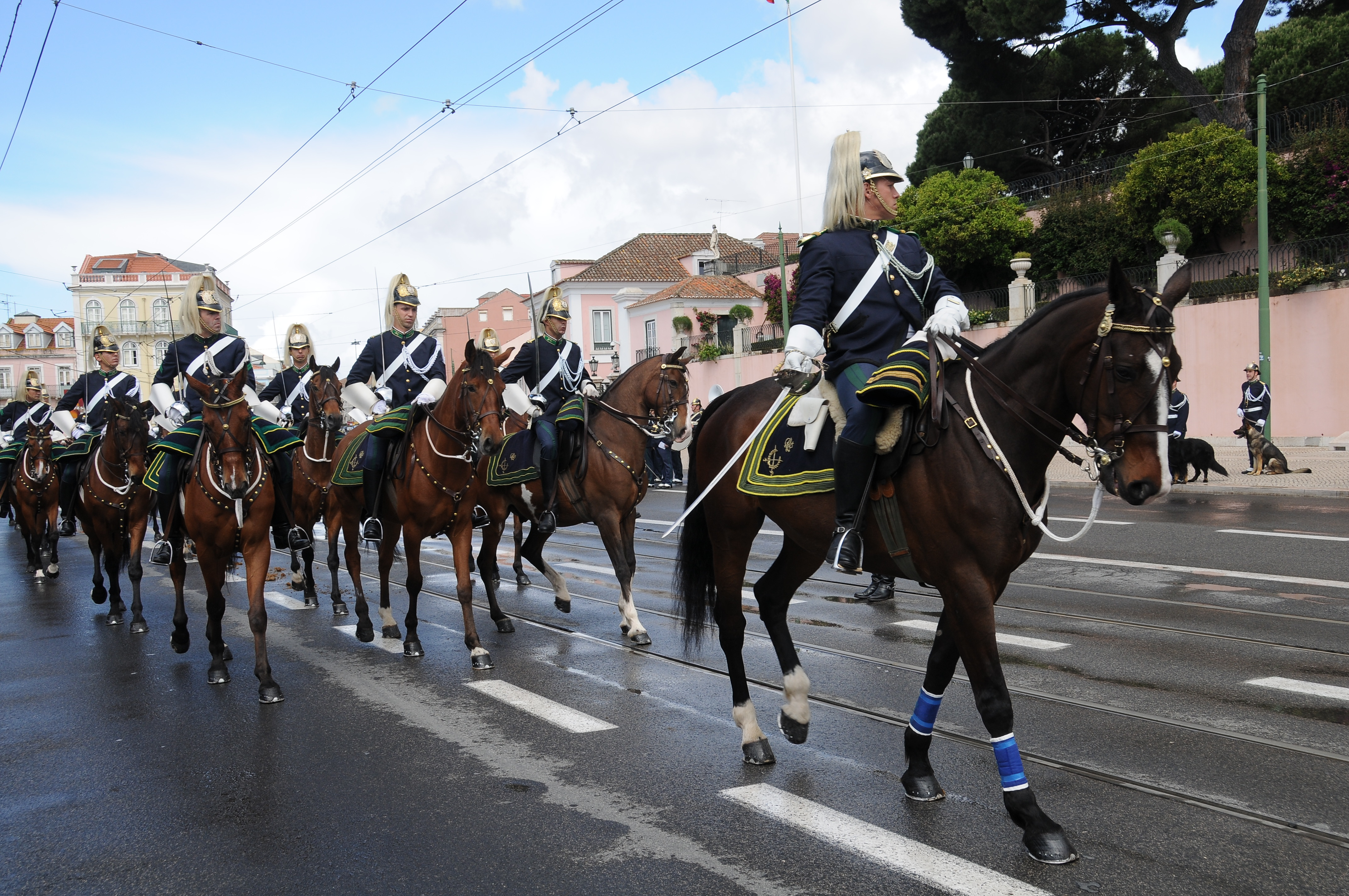
Changing of the GNR guard of the Presidential Palace

The Nacional Republican Guard (GNR, Guarda Nacional Republicana) is a special corps of troops that has the special feature of being a military force that is not part of the Armed Forces.

It is a gendarmerie type security force, made up of around 26 000 military personnel, that is part of the internal security system. It is responsible for the preventive policing of most of the rural areas of the country, the patrolling of the major highways, the customs enforcement and the coastal control. It also performs some special missions like the providing of ceremonial military State honor guards, the security of the Presidential, Parliament and Foreign Ministry palaces, the environment and nature protection and the rescue and forest firefighting. In time of peace, the GNR is subordinated to the minister of Internal Administration, except in the scope of uniforms, military doctrine, equipment and armament within which is subordinated to the minister of National Defense.

Although not being part of the Armed Forces, the GNR can be placed under the operational command of the Chief of the General Staff of the Armed Forces in the cases foreseen in the statutes governing the National Defense, the Armed Forces, the state of siege and the state of emergency. In the scope of its military missions, the GNR is specially adapted for the fulfillment of military operations other than war. Forces of the GNR have been deployed in international missions in high conflict countries that did not fit with the use of a civilian police force, but where it was not considered politically appropriate to deploy units of the Armed Forces. These international deployments may be done in the scope of the multinational specialized units (MSU) of the European Gendarmerie Force, as it happened with the GNR deployment in Iraq.

== Special forces ==
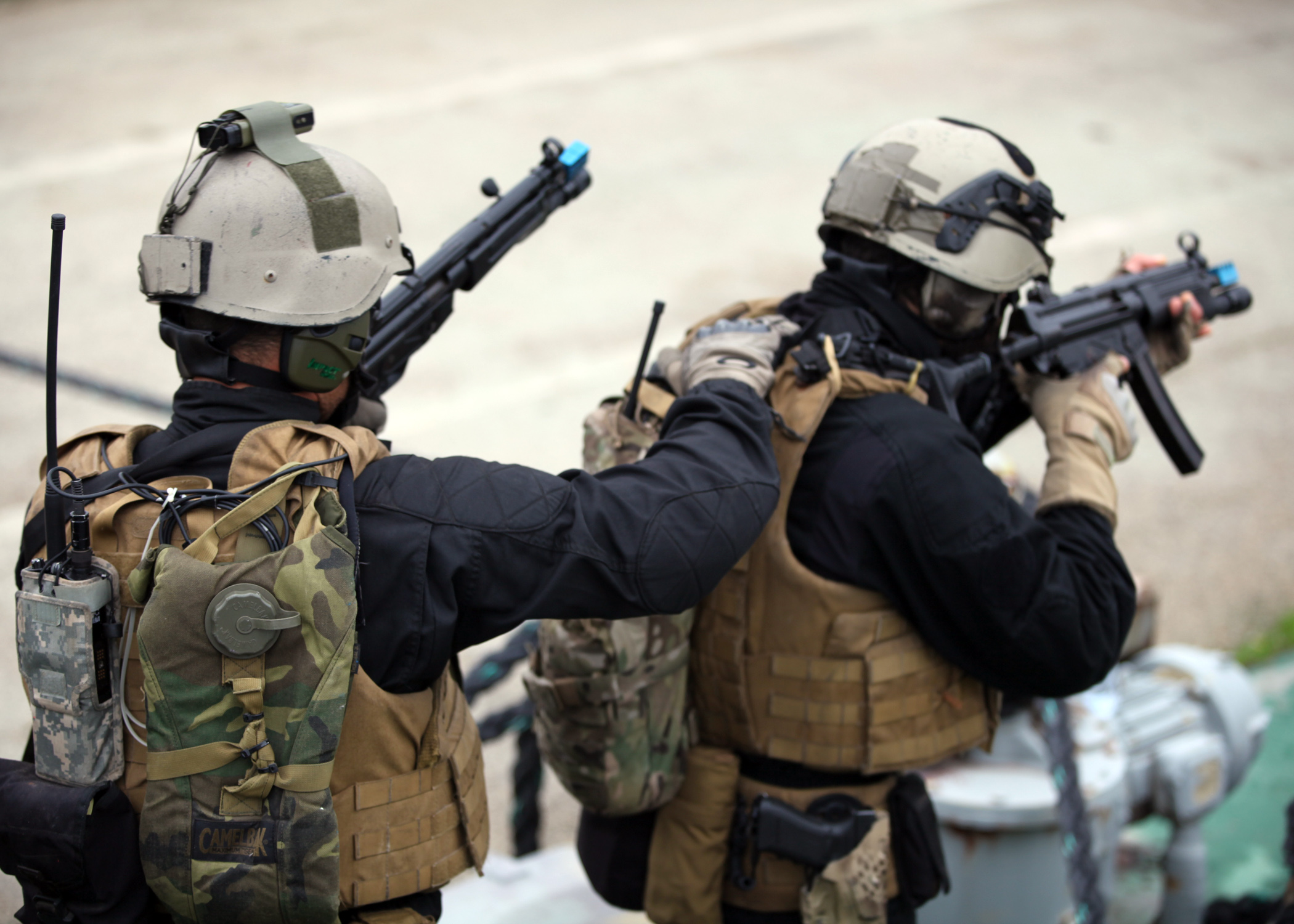
Operators of the Portuguese Navy's Special Actions Detachment

The Portuguese Armed Forces include a number of different types of special forces, distributed by its three branches.

In the Army, these are generically referred as the "special troops" or the "light infantry" and represent more than 20% of the total strength of the branch. The Army special troops include the Paratroopers, the Commandos and the Special Operations Troops. The Paratroopers are a mainly parachute light infantry force, that however also include some non-infantry specialized units. The Paratroopers in turn include the Air-Land Pathfinders Company, which is a special parachute reconnaissance unit. The Commandos are a light assault infantry force, specialized in conducting high risk conventional operations. The Special Operations Troops is the Army unit specialized in unconventional warfare.

The Navy has the Marines Corps (Corpo de Fuzileiros) as its special forces. These are a light naval infantry force, specialized in amphibious landings, base and ship security, high seas boarding and naval military police. The Marines include the Special Actions Detachment which is the Navy's special operations unit dedicated to the unconventional warfare in naval and coastal environment. The Marines also include the PelBoard (Boarding Platoon) teams, that are specialized in high risk visit, board, search, and seizure (VBSS) actions. The Sappers Divers Group is the Navy's specialized combat divers unit, which however is not usually considered a special forces unit.

The present special forces unit of the Air Force is the Tactical Operations of Protection Core (NOTP). This unit is part of the Air Police and is mainly dedicated to the protection of the forces and assets of the Air Force deployed in high risk areas.

== Personnel ==
Currently, the Portuguese Armed Forces include 32,992 military personnel, of which 12% are women. The majority of the personnel is in the Army (54%), followed by the Navy (26%) and the Air Force (20%). Conscription in time of peace was fully abolished in 2004 and, since then, 100% of the military personnel is professional.

=== Military service ===
The defense of the Fatherland is a right and a duty of all the Portuguese. The Portuguese citizens have military obligations from the age of 18 years to the age of 35 years.

The military service include the following situations:

- Effective service - is the situation of the citizens when they are at the service of the Armed Forces. It includes effective service in the QP (career personnel), RC (contract personnel) and RV (volunteer personnel) or due to call or mobilization.
- Recruiting reserve - is made of the Portuguese citizens, from the age of 18 years to the age of 35 years, who never served in the Armed Forces, but can be object of an exceptional recruiting.
- Availability reserve - is made of the Portuguese citizens who have served in the Armed Forces, from the end of their effective service until the end of their military obligations. To call effects, the availability reserve situation includes the six subsequent years after the effective service.

In time of war, the military obligations age limits can be changed by law.

=== Career and voluntary personnel ===
In time of peace, the military personnel falls in two main groups: career personnel (permanent personnel) and volunteer (temporary personnel). In case of war, these two groups are added with conscript personnel.

Career personnel (QP, Quadro Permanente) includes the persons who choose the military profession as their permanent life career. Admission to this career requires the graduation in one of the higher education service academies for officers or in one of the military technical schools for non-officers. QP personnel only includes officers and sergeants in the Army and the Air Force, but it also includes other ranks in the Navy. Other ranks in the Army and the Air Force are entirely volunteer.

Volunteer personnel includes the persons who usually have a civilian profession, but volunteer to serve temporarily in the military. They might serve in roles related specifically with their civilian professions (e.g.: engineers, legals, psychologists or medics) or in general military roles. They include officers, sergeants and other ranks. Volunteer personnel are further subdivided in two groups: contract regime (RC, Regime de Contrato) and volunteer regime (RV, Regime de Voluntariado). While RC personnel serves for between two and six years, RV personnel serves only for 12 months. Special RC regimes with the duration of up to 20 years are foreseen to be created for roles whose training and technical demands make desirable long periods of service. Personnel in RV can apply to serve in RC after their termination of their period of service.

=== Ranks and categories ===
Accordingly, with their level of responsibility and authority, Portuguese military personnel are divided in three categories: officers (oficiais), sergeants (sargentos) and other ranks (praças). Officers are further divided in three subcategories: general officers (oficiais generais), senior officers (oficiais superiores) and junior officers (oficiais subalternos).

=== Occupational groups ===
Accordingly, with their training and role, each member of the Portuguese Armed Forces is part of an occupational group, to each of which corresponds a career and a particular list of promotion. These occupational groups have different specific designations in each branch of service.

The Navy occupational groups are named "classes". For the officers, the classes are navy (M), naval engineers (EN), naval administration (AN), marines (FZ), naval physicians (MN), naval senior technicians (TSN), technical service (ST), health technicians (TS) and musicians (MUS). For the enlisted, the classes are administrative (L), communications (C), auto mechanics-drivers (V), electro mechanics (EM), electro technicians (ET), marines (FZ), maneuvers (M), naval machinists (MQ), divers (U), musicians (B), operations (O), stewards (T) and weapons technicians (A).

The Army occupational groups are designated "corps of general officers", "arms" and "services". The corps of general officers include all generals, who may originate from the arms or from some of the services officer careers, but with only those originating from the arms being able to achieve the ranks above that of major-general. The arms are mostly careers associated with combatant roles while the services are mostly careers associated with logistical roles. For the officers, the arms are infantry (INF), artillery (ART), cavalry (CAV), engineering (ENG) and communications (TM) and the services are military administration (ADMIL), materiel (MAT), medicine (MED), pharmacy (FARM), veterinary (VET), dentistry (DENT), nursery, diagnostic and therapeutic technicians (TEDT), chiefs of music band (CBMUS), communications exploration technicians (TEXPTM), communications maintenance technicians (TMANTM), materiel maintenance technicians (TMANMAT), personnel and secretariat technicians (TPESSECR), transportations technicians (TTRANS), Army general service (SGE) and parachutist general service (SGPQ). For the sergeants, the arms are infantry (INF), artillery (ART), cavalry (CAV), engineering (ENG), communications (TM) and parachutists (PARAQ) and the services are military administration (AM), materiel (MAT), medicine (MED), pharmacy (FARM), veterinary (VET), music (MUS), clarions (CLAR), personnel and secretariat (PESSECR), transportations (TRANS), Army general service (SGE) and amanuensis (AMAN).

The Army volunteers occupational groups are analogous to the arms and services, but correspond to more specific qualifications. They include functional areas subdivided in specialties for officers and sergeants and specialties for other ranks. The functional areas for the officers and sergeants are mechanized/motorized infantry (AF01), light infantry (AF02), field artillery (AF03), anti-aircraft artillery (AF04), cavalry (AF05), Army police (AF06), communications (AF10), transportation (AF18), materiel (AF21), administration (AF22), personnel and secretariat (AF23), engineering (AF24), senior support technicians (AF25), health – medicine (AF26), health – nursery (AF26), health – nursery, diagnostic and therapeutic (AF27), dental health (AF28), veterinary health (AF29) and pharmacy. The specialties for the other ranks are field (Esp-01), mechanics (Esp-02), auto mechanics (Esp-03), engineering equipment mechanics (Esp-04), panel beater mechanics (Esp-05), auto body painter mechanics (Esp-06), services (Esp-07), audiovisual-multimedia (Esp-08), audiovisual-graphics (Esp-09), services saddler-upholstery (Esp-10), services psychometric laboratory operator (Esp-11), engineering sapper (Esp-12), NBC sapper (Esp-13), military light vehicles driving (Esp-14), military heavy vehicles driving (Esp-15), Army police (Esp-16), communications (Esp-17), music (Esp-18), health (Esp-19), paratroopers (Esp-20), special operations (Esp-21), commandos (Esp-22), construction (Esp-23), plumbing (Esp-24), construction carpenter (Esp-25), construction electrician (Esp-26), engineering heavy equipment operator (Esp-27), metalworking (Esp-28), farrier (Esp-29), catering (Esp-30), bakery (Esp-31) and rescue and assistance systems operator (Esp-32).

The Air Force occupational groups are designated "specialties". The officers specialties include pilots-aviators (PILAV), aeronautic engineers (ENGAER), aerodromes engineers (ENGAED), electrical engineers (ENGEL), physicians (MED), aeronautical administration (ADMAER), jurists (JUR), psychologists (PSI), navigators (NAV), communications and cryptography operations technicians (TOCC), meteorology operations technicians (TOMET), air circulation and traffic radar operations technicians (TOCART), interception conduct operations technicians (TOCI), air materiel maintenance technicians (TMMA), ground materiel maintenance technicians (TMMT), electrical materiel maintenance technicians (TMMEL), armament and equipment maintenance technicians (TMAEQ), infrastructures maintenance technicians (TMI), supply technicians (TABST), IT technicians (TINF), personnel and administrative support technicians (TPAA), health technicians (TS), air police (PA) and chiefs of music band (CHBM). The enlisted personnel specialties include communications operators (OPCOM), meteorology operators (OPMET), air circulation and traffic radar operators (OPCART), detection radar operators (OPRDET), IT operators (OPINF), assistance and aid systems operators (OPSAS), air materiel mechanics (MMA), ground materiel mechanics (MMT), electricity mechanics (MELECT), electronics mechanics (MELECA), aircraft electricity and instruments mechanics (MELIAV), armament and equipment mechanics (MARME), supply (ABS), infrastructure construction and maintenance (CMI), air police (PA), secretariat and service support (SAS) and musicians (MUS).

=== Uniforms and insignia ===
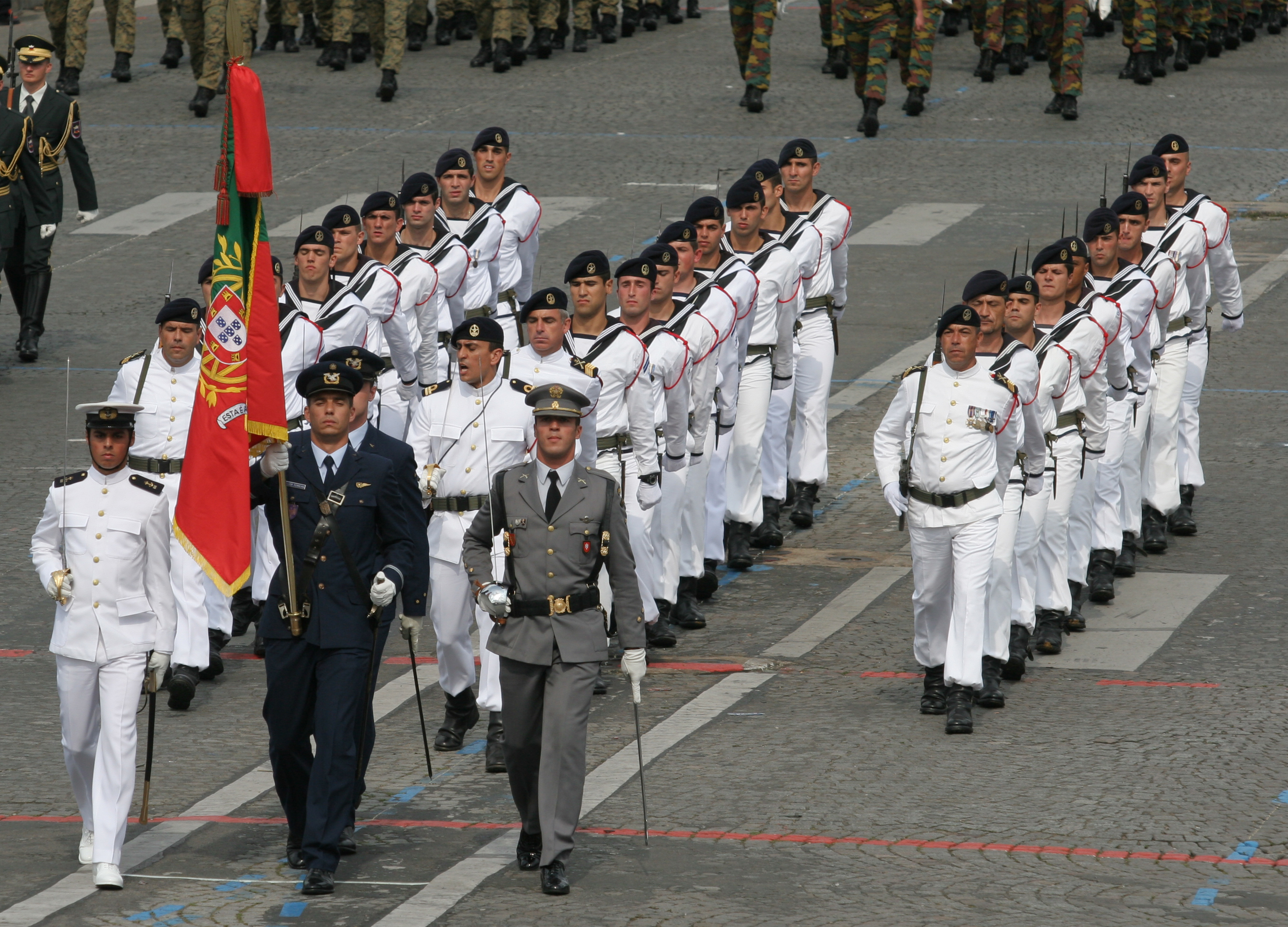
Portuguese tri-service color guard, leading a Fuzileiros detachment, showing the service dress uniforms worn by the three branches

As is usual in most of the Armed Forces in the world, each branch has its own uniform regulation which is distinct from those of the other service branches. The traditional color of the Portuguese military uniforms, since the middle of the 18th century, was the azul ferrete (very dark blue). This is still the color of the full dress uniforms of the three service branches.

The service dress uniform colors are the navy blue (Winter) or white (Summer) for the Navy, grey for the Army and air force blue for the Air Force. The 2019 Army uniform regulation abolished the olive green No.2 Army service dress uniform.

All the three branches have a camouflaged battledress uniform in the DPM pattern (from 1998 to 2010, the Air Force used instead the U.S. Woodland pattern). These camouflage patterns replaced the traditional Portuguese vertical lizard pattern that was in use in the three service branches from the early 1960s to the late 1990s. In the latte 2018, the Portuguese Army started to experiment the Sistemas de Combate do Soldado (Soldier's Combat Systems) individual equipment system for the dismounted soldiers, which includes the new Multiterreno camouflage pattern of the Multicam-style. The Multiterreno became the official camouflage pattern for the Army field and garrison uniforms in 2019.

The members of most of the branches, units or specialties of the three branches of the Armed Forces are identified by the wearing of berets whose colors are emerald green (Paratroopers), black (Army generic), navy blue (Marines), air force blue (Air Police), red (Commandos), moss green (Special Operations) and blue (Navy generic). The 2019 Army uniform regulation abolished the traditional brown beret, with black becoming the generic color of the Army berets. Until then, black berets were reserved for use by the Cavalry.

On the contrary of the uniforms, there is a standard common model of rank insignia used in the uniforms of the three service branches. The existence of a common rank insignia system has been in force since 1761, when the Portuguese Army and Navy become one of the first militaries in the world to establish a rank insignia regulation, that was common for the two existing branches at the time. The present system of rank insignia was established in 1911 and is an evolution of the previous ones. Its generic rank devices consists in stars for the general officers, in stripes for the rest of the officers, in Portuguese shields for the senior sergeants and in chevrons for the rest of the sergeants and the other ranks. There is a specific rank insignia for the admirals or generals invested in the office of Chief of the General Staff of the Armed Forces, consisting in four golden stars, which differ from the silver stars worn by the rest of the four-star rank officers (chiefs of staff of the service branches).
