= Commandos (Portugal) =

Commando Regiment
- Regimento de Comandos
- The badge of the Commando Regiment.
- Active: 1962–1994; 2002–present
- Country: Portugal
- Allegiance: Portugal
- Branch: Portuguese Army
- Type: Commando
- Size: One battalion
- Part of: Rapid Reaction Brigade
- Barracks: Carregueira
- Nickname: Red Berets (Boinas Vermelhas)
- Motto: Audaces Fortuna Juvat (Fortune Favors the Bold)
- March: Mama Sumae
- Anniversaries: 29 June
- Engagements: Portuguese Colonial War; Coup of 25 November 1975; War in Afghanistan (2001–2021); Central African Republic Civil War (2012–present) (part of MINUSCA); Insurgency in Cabo Delgado (training support)
- Decorations: Most decorated troop in the Portuguese Armed Forces
- Website: https://www.exercito.pt/pt/recrutamento/tropas-especiais/comandos

Commanders
- Commander: Colonel Pombo
- Notable commanders: Jaime Neves

Insignia
- Abbreviation: RCmds

The Commandos (Portuguese: Comandos) are a special operations unit in the Portuguese Army. Their parent unit is the Commando Regiment (Regimento de Comandos).

Their motto is Audaces Fortuna Juvat (Latin for "Fortune Favors the Bold") and their war cry is Mama Sumae (it can be translated as "here we are, ready for the sacrifice" – taken from a Bantu tribe of southern Angola).

They were created in Angola during 1962, in the scope of the Portuguese Overseas War, as counter-guerrilla forces, combat patrol in dangerous and difficult to reach areas, irregular warfare, long-range penetration, and special reconnaissance, thus responding to the need of the Portuguese Army to have special units specially adapted to the type of war. Initially operating in the Angolan theatre, later units of Commandos also operated in the Portuguese Guinea and Mozambique theatres

The Portuguese Commandos are analogous to the 75th Ranger Regiment and Army Special Forces of the US Army.

== Commando Regiment ==
The Portuguese Army Commando troops constitute the Commando Regiment (RCmds), a base unit that reports to the Headquarters of the Portuguese Rapid Reaction Brigade. Until July 2015, this unit was designated "Commando Troops Center".

The operational component of the Commando Regiment is the Commando Battalion (BCmds), which by itself includes three maneuver companies and a headquarters and support company. Together with Portuguese Paratroopers and CTOE units, the Commando Battalion is one of the operational units of the Rapid Reaction Brigade.

Besides its operational battalion, the Commando Regiment also includes a regimental headquarters and staff, a headquarters and services support company and a training company.

== History ==
=== Origin ===
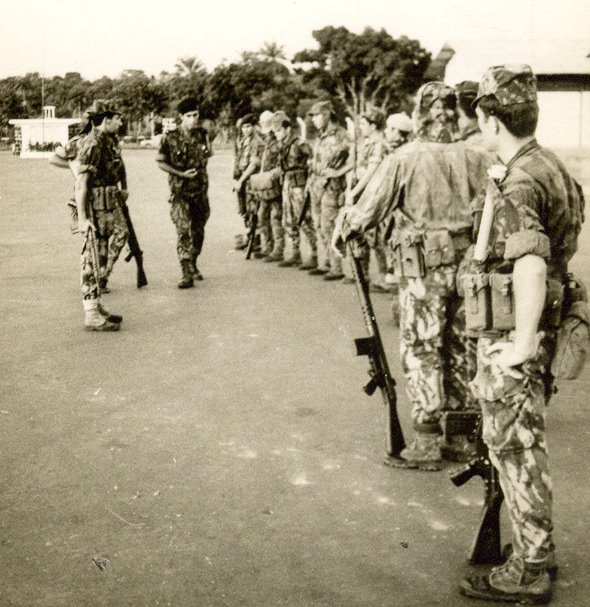
A commando group ready to go into action in the Portuguese Guinea, 1966.

When the Overseas War started in 1961 in Angola, the Portuguese Army employed its units of Special Caçadores. These were special light infantry units organized and trained by the Special Operations Training Centre to conduct counterinsurgency, direct action behind enemy lines, irregular warfare operations, long-range penetration, and special reconnaissance. In 1962, however a decision was taken by the Army to enlarge the organization and training of the Special Caçadores to all the infantry units engaged in the war, at the same time disbanding those special units. This however proved to be unfeasible and the Army founded itself without units able to conduct special operations in the scope of guerrilla warfare.

So, in 1962, the Portuguese Army needed units with the ability to:

- conduct special operations in the Portuguese territory or abroad
- fight as assault with commando styles
- provide the high political and military commands with a force able to conduct irregular warfare

The first objective that the army set out to achieve was that of building a force specially prepared for counter-guerrilla forces, but the Portuguese commandos also participated in irregular warfare operations, with units specially organised for each operation, and in combat patrol operations, with conventional warfare characteristics, especially in the last years of the war, when they operated in battalion strength, backed up by artillery, mortars, and the Portuguese Air Force (FAP).

The history of the Portuguese commandos began on 25 June, 1962, when, in Zemba (Northern Angola), the first six groups of those that would be the predecessors of the commandos, were formed. For the preparation of these groups, the CI 21 – Centro de Instrução de Contraguerrilha (Counter-Guerrilla Instruction Centre) was created, commanded by Lieutenant-Colonel Nave, and had as instructor, the photographer and former French Foreign Legion Sergeant, the Italian Dante Vachi, with experience in the Indochina and Algerian wars.

The six groups prepared in this center achieved excellent operational results. Nonetheless, the military command in Angola decided to re-evaluate the instruction and integration of these units into the army and, in 1963 and 64, the 16 and 25 Instruction Centres (CI 16 and CI 25) were created, in Quibala, Angola. For the first time, the term "Comandos" (Commandos) was applied to the troops instructed there.

On 13 February, 1964, the first Mozambique Commandos Course was initiated in Namaacha (Lourenço Marques, now Maputo) and on 23 July of the same year, in Bra (Portuguese Guinea), the first Guinea Commandos Course.

=== Casualties ===
Portuguese commando soldiers that participated in active operations: more than 9000 men (510 officers, 1587 NCOs and 6977 soldiers) served in 67 commando companies.

Combat casualties:

- 357 KIAs (killed in action)
- 28 MIAs (Missing In Action)
- 771 wounded

The commandos constituted about 1% of all the forces present in the Colonial War, but the number of their deaths is about 10% of the total of the casualties; a percentage ten times more than that of regular forces, which happens because they were the most employed troops. It's also generally known that the commandos eliminated more guerrilla fighters and captured more weaponry than the other forces. These characteristics made them the only ones to get a mystical aura that remained after the war.

=== Postwar ===
After the war, the commandos continued to develop their skills until 1993 when they were disbanded. This decision was influenced by a number of deaths during instruction. The commando soldiers were merged with the Paratroopers and these were transferred from the Air Force to the Army. But in 2002, the commandos were reactivated as an independent unit and the Batalhão de Comandos (Commando Battalion) was created, with two Operational Companies and an Instruction Company. They are now based in the Centro de Tropas Comandos (Commando Troops Centre) in Mafra. They were deployed to Afghanistan in 2005, where a sergeant was killed by a roadside bomb; the first commando KIA since the end of the Portuguese Colonial War. In 2006, Army Chief of Staff General "Comando" Pinto Ramalho informed that the Army was developing studies in order to raise a third Operational Company, with a size force increase; the Centro de Tropas Comando are actually a garrison in Carregueira.

In 2015 the historical title of Commando Regiment was restored.

== Selection and Training ==
Training to become a Commando takes 34 weeks. Success candidates are expected to service a minimum of 2 years.

This is broken down in the following stages:-

Basic training; This 5 week basic training aims to provide the candidate with basic military training, with an introduction to military culture at this stage.

Additional training (stage 1); This 7 week stage aims to provide advanced military training, and combat technique is given at this stage.

Additional training (stage 2); This 5 week stage aims to provide the military with military leadership training, at this stage command and leadership modules are taught. This training is only for Officer, and Non-commissioned Officers.

Commando course; This 17 week course is broken down to two stages, a 3 week preparation stage followed by a 14 week commando course.

== Organisation and evolution ==
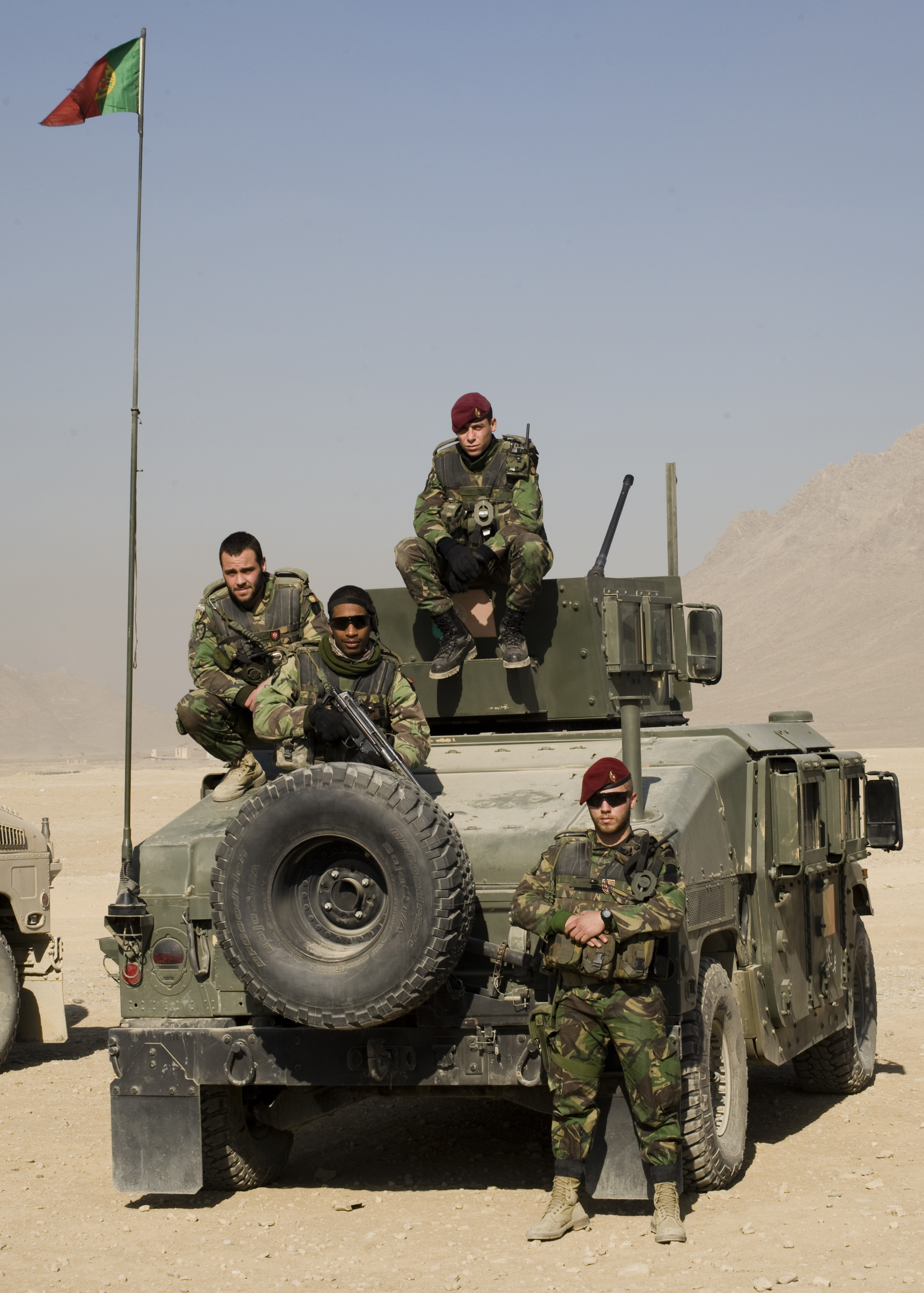
Portuguese Commandos in Afghanistan, 2011.

In its first phase, the commandos organised into independent groups composed of volunteers from infantry battalions, forming their intervention units. The success of these groups meant that they rapidly started to be used under the commander-in-chief's and military commanders' orders, to conduct special operations. The groups' organisation (example):

- one command team (one officer, one combat signaller, one NCO, one combat medic, one sharpshooter 12.7mm command team)
- three manoeuvre teams (one NCO, one sharpshooter 7.62mm, one 7.62mm machine gun and two riflemen)

depending on the mission will have two of the following teams:

- two mortar teams (one NCO, one sharpshooter 5.62mm, one 60mm command mortar, one ammunition soldier, one soldier)
- two anti-tank team (one NCO, one anti-tank weapon Carl Gustav, one sharpshooter 5.62mm, one ammunition soldier, one soldier)

This organisation of a group with six teams and each team with five men suffered adaptations, but the base-cell, the five-men team, remained throughout the war.

The war's evolution revealed the necessity of more commando soldiers and independent units, capable of operating during longer periods and being self-sustained: reasons that led to the creation of commando companies. The first company was formed in Portuguese Angola and its instruction started in September 1964. Its commander, Captain Albuquerque Gonçalves, received the unit's banner on February 5, 1965. The second company had as its destination Mozambique, commanded by Captain Jaime Neves.

The organisation and organisational principles of the Portuguese commandos, are established in great mobility and creativity and in counter-guerrilla forces combat techniques, very well defined and able to support permanent innovation.

The composition and organisation of the commando companies were always adapted to the circumstances and situations, although throughout the war it was possible to verify two main models, that originated what we can call light companies and heavy companies. The former were composed of four commando groups, each one with four sub-groups, constituting 80 men and with few back-up components. These companies had little capability to maintain themselves, independently, during long periods of time, because they were meant as temporary reinforcements to units in quadrillage, like intervention forces, and received from those units the necessary support. In these companies, the mobility and flexibility were privileged, and were initially used in Guinea and Mozambique. The heavy companies had five, five-team commando groups, in a total of 125 men, together with a formation of service personnel, of about 80 men, with medics, signallers, transport soldiers and cooks. Another type of organisation was adapted to the companies of African commandos, formed in Guinea and composed of metropolitan soldiers when needed, a bit like the Green Berets did in Vietnam War with the "advisers". The war's evolution, the necessity that started to exist of fighting in large units in Guinea and Mozambique and to, sometimes simultaneously, conduct irregular warfare and special operations actions, led to the creation of commando battalions in those two theatres. This function of mother-unit was, in Angola and since its foundation, performed by the Centro de Instrução de Comandos (Commando Instruction Centre), that also needed to adapt, separating the instruction activity and gathering the operational units in a base in Campo Militar de Grafanil (Grafanil Military Camp), near Luanda, although it was never completely independent of the operational use under a specific command. As larger commando units the Centro de Instrução de Comandos (Commando Instruction Center), in Angola, the Batalhão de Comandos da Guiné (Guinea Commando Battalion) and the Batalhão de Comandos de Moçambique (Mozambique Commando Battalion) were formed.

Although Angola's Commando Instruction Centre was the home and it was in that centre that the main core of military doctrine of use and mystique of the commandos were formed, all battalions gave instruction to their staff and formed units to intervene in the operations theatre. Beyond this centre, that prepared units meant for Angola and Mozambique and the first commandos of Guinea, in Portugal a commando centre was also created in CIOE – Centro de Instrução de Operações Especiais (Special Operations Instruction Centre), in Lamego, that instructed units mobilised to Guinea and Mozambique.

In its history, the commandos were formed in Zemba, Angola, after June 25, 1962, in Quibala, Angola, since June 30, 1963, in Namaacha, Mozambique, since 13 February, 1964, in Bra, Guinea, since July 23, 1964, in Luanda, Angola, after 29 June, 1965, in Lamego, Portugal, since 12 April, 1966 and in Montepuez, Mozambique, after 1 October, 1969. After the Colonial War, Portugal gave independence to all of its colonies and all the commandos started to be instructed in Amadora, Portugal, since 1 July, 1974.

== Commando units ==
=== Africa ===
Served in Angola (1963–1975)

- 21st Training Center (CI21) - created in 1962 and disbanded in the same year. It was the first Commando training unit;
- 16th Training Center (CI16) - succeeded CI21 in 1963, as the Commando training unit;
- 25th Training Center (CI25) - succeeded CI16 in 1964, as the Commando training unit. It was transformed in the Commando Training Center in 1965;
- Commando Training Center (CICmds) - created in 1965 by the transformation of the CI25;
- Commando Companies (CCmds): 1st, 2nd, 6th, 8th, 14th, 19th, 20th, 30th, 2024th, 2044th, 2046th and 2047th - temporary units mobilized in Angola from 1964. The 2nd Company served both in Angola and in Mozambique;
- Commando companies: 11th, 12th, 22nd, 24th, 25th, 31st, 33rd, 37th, 36th, 2041st, 2042nd, 4042nd and 112th/74 - temporary units mobilized in European Portugal from 1967. The 11th company raised by the 5th Caçadores Battalion, the 12th company raised by the 1st Light Artillery Regiment and the remaining companies raised by the Special Operations Training Center.

Served in Portuguese Guinea (1964–1974)

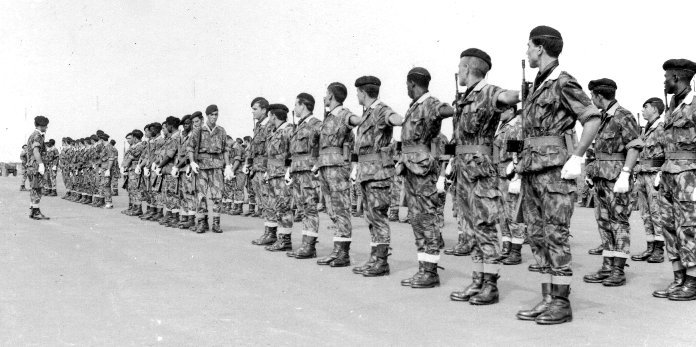
The Guinea Commando Company being reviewed, 1966.

- Guinea Commando Training Center (CICmds) - created in 1964 and transformed in the Guinea Commando Company in 1965;
- Commando groups (GrCmds): "Camaleões", "Fantasmas" and "Panteras" - temporary units, existing between 1965 and 1966;
- Guinea Commando Company (CCmdsGuiné) - created in 1965 and disbanded in 1966. Included the Commando groups: "Apaches", "Centuriões", "Diabólicos", "Vampiros" and "Grusinos";
- Commando companies (CCmds): 3rd, 5th, 15th, 16th, 26th, 27th, 35th and 38th - temporary units mobilized in European Portugal from 1966. The 3rd and 5th were raised by the 1st Light Artillery Regiment, the remaining by the Special Operations Training Centre;
- African Commando Companies (CCmdsAfricanos): 1st, 2nd and 3rd – mobilized in Guinea from 1969 and composed entirely of blacks;
- Guinea Commando Battalion (BCmdsGuiné) – created in 1972 to centralize the command, training and support to all commando companies operating Commando companies operating in the Portuguese Guinea.

Served in Mozambique (1964–1975)

- Commando Companies (CCmds): 2nd, 7th, 17th and 21st - temporary units mobilized in Angola to serve in Mozambique, from 1966. The 2nd Company also served in Angola itself. All of these companies were raised by the Angola Commando Training Center;
- Commando companies: 4th, 9th,10th,18th, 23rd, 28th, 29th, 32nd, 34th, 2040th,2043rd, 2045th and 4040th - temporary units mobilized in European Portugal. The 4th, 9th, 10th and 18th companies were raised by the 1st Light Artillery Regiment and the remaining were raised by the Special Operations Training Center
- Mozambique Commando companies (CCmdsMoç): 1st, 2nd, 3rd, 4th, 5th, 6th, 7th, 8th and 9th – temporary units mobilized in Mozambique from 1970 and composed both of blacks and whites;
- Mozambique Commando Battalion (BCmdsMoç) – created in 1969 to centralize the command, training and support to all Commando companies operating in Mozambique.

=== Portugal ===
Served in Portugal (1974–1993):

- Commando Regiment, which included the:
  - Commando Battalion 11 (BCmds 11) - included the commando companies (CCmds): 111, 112, 113 and 114. BCmds 11 was formed with 2041st, 2042nd, 4041st and 112th/74 CCmds, after coming back from Angola and Guinea, changing their numbers. CCmds 113 was later deactivated;
  - Commando Battalion 12 (BCmds 12) - included the CCmds: 121, 122 and 123 (heavy weapons). CCmds 123 was deactivated in 1982; CCmds 131 was created later, also of heavy weapons. In this battalion was also integrated the Commando Company REDES (Raids and Destructions);
  - Commando Company 131 (heavy weapons) - created in 1982 as the initial company of the future Commando Battalion 13, which was never activated. It was later deactivated;
  - Headquarters and Support Battalion (BCS/RCmds) - included: Headquarters and Services, Specialities Training, Maintenance and Transport and Resupply companies;
  - Training Battalion (BInstrução/RCmds) - included Training companies: 1st and 2nd;

Serving currently in Portugal (since 2006)

- Commando Regiment, which includes:
  - Regimental Headquarters and Headquarters Company (CCS/RCmds);
  - Commando Battalion - includes Battalion Headquarters and Support Company (CCA/BCmds), Commando companies (CCmds): 1st CCmds "Morcegos", 2nd CCmds "Escorpiões" and 3rd CCmds "Cobras".
  - Training Company (CF/RCmds).

== Selection ==
1. Must be a Portuguese citizen
2. Must be at least 18 years old
3. Pass a medical and psychological exam

Physical tests:

- run 2500 meters under 12 minutes
- 47 sit-ups under 2 minutes
- 5 continuous pull-ups (palms forward)
- 32 push-ups
- jump a 3-meter ditch
- jump a 90 cm-high wall
- walk a 5-meter-high portico
- swim 25 meters
- complete a labyrinth tunnel
- walk 8 km under 60 minutes, fully equipped and with extra 5 kg of weight

The physical tests are very easy to complete, which allows the commandos to have large numbers of recruits; useful because there will be a lot of drop-outs during the instruction. It has been confirmed that due to the severity of the training, there is only a 20% completion rate. After passing all the tests, the recruits will start the instruction.

Most of the instruction schedule or nature is unknown to the recruits. That means that they must be constantly ready and, to the smallest indication, present themselves on the parade ground or where they are ordered to, and follow whatever the instructors say. It might happen that they stay uninterrupted in instruction for more than a day, or that they have to conduct their daily lives during the night. The unforeseen and surprise are fundamental characteristics of the instruction. Each recruit must also be self-controlled: they have to control reactions that, otherwise, might be normal if they were not future Commandos. All the demands made in the instruction are not obligations: each recruit has the right to refuse to do whatever he is ordered to. Obviously, doing this means that he is off the course.

When a recruit successfully completes the instruction he is badged as a commando and receives the famous red beret. The badging ceremony (like other traditions of the Commandos) is inspired by old Portuguese military orders (these were forces that, in medieval Portugal, were tasked with HUMINT and surveillance in peacetime; first resistance in the defensive and first attack in the offensive; they were also the strongest forces during wartime).

== Equipment ==
Infantry equipment

- Glock 17 Gen 5
- Heckler & Koch MP5
- FN SCAR L
- FN SCAR H
- Heckler & Koch MG4
- FN Minimi Mk3
- Browning M2HB
- Carl Gustav M3
- M72A3 LAW
- Heckler & Koch GMG

Combat vehicles

- HMMWV M1151A1/1152A1
- URO VAMTAC ST5
- Ranger Special Operations Vehicle

== See also ==
- Portuguese Colonial War
- Portuguese Armed Forces
- Portuguese irregular forces in the Overseas War
