= Flechas =

Former Portuguese colonial paramilitary units

- The insignia of the Flechas.
- Active: 1967–1975
- Country: Portugal
- Allegiance: Portugal
- Branch: PIDE
- Type: Paramilitary
- Part of: PIDE/DGS
- Garrison/HQ: Lisbon
- Engagements: Portuguese Colonial War

Commanders
- Notable commanders: Oscar Cardoso

The Flechas (Portuguese for Arrows) were an elite paramilitary tactical unit of the Portuguese secret police (PIDE, latter renamed DGS) that operated in Angola and Mozambique during the Portuguese Colonial War. Unlike most of the other Portuguese special forces that were employed in the several theatres of operations of the conflict, the Flechas were not a de jure military unit but a PIDE/DGS (secret police) unit.

Flechas were organized as platoon-sized units consisting of local tribesmen and rebel defectors. They sometimes patrolled in captured uniforms and were rewarded with cash bounties for every guerrilla or guerrilla weapon they captured.

Flechas had a reputation for atrocities, brutality, torture, and summary executions.

== History ==
Flechas units were created and employed in Angola, during the Portuguese Colonial War, under the command of the PIDE (renamed DGS in 1969). Despite being a paramilitary police force, they were thus a police unit, not being under military command as the remaining special force.

Composed of locally recruited men, often former guerrilla fighters but mostly bushman Khoisan, the units specialised in reconnaissance, tracking, unconventional tactics, and pseudo-terrorist operations.

The Flechas were created by Oscar Cardoso and organized by Sub-Inspector Lelio Joia, when he was the head of the PIDE branch at Serpa Pinto, Angola (present day Menongue). Initially, the unit was intended to support the activities of the branch, whose area of responsibility covered the remote eastern areas of Angola that the Portuguese called Terras do Fim do Mundo (Lands of the End of the World) and which corresponded to the Frente Leste theater. In this theater, they achieved a great success in the early 1970s, contributing for the virtual Portuguese victory in the campaign.

The success of the initial Flechas unit created by Oscar Cardoso, made PIDE/DGS to expand the concept and to created new groups attached to other of its local branches.

General Costa Gomes – Portuguese Commander-in-Chief in Angola – argued that African soldiers were cheaper, knew the terrain better, and were better able to create a relationship with the local populace, a tactic that predates the 'hearts and minds' strategy later used by United States forces in Vietnam at the time.

Flechas units were also created and operated in Mozambique at the very end stages of the conflict, following the dismissal of Kaúlza de Arriaga on the eve of the Portuguese coup in 1974. The units were to continue to cause problems for the FRELIMO even after independence and Portuguese withdrawal, when the country splintered into civil war.

The Flechas served as model for the latter created Rhodesian Selous Scouts and the South African Koevoet.

== Organization ==
The Flechas were organized into platoon size combat groups of about 30 men each, although the formation was often loose. Each of these groups was dependent from a PIDE / DGS local branch, operating in its area of responsibility.

== Uniforms and equipment ==
The Flechas received combat uniforms identical to those worn by the Portuguese Armed Forces, in the Portuguese vertical lizard pattern camouflage. With this uniform, they wore a beret with the same camouflage pattern. This non standard camouflage beret became their most distinctive uniform item. In parade, the Flechas also wore neck scarves and metal tabs in the left shoulder with the name of the unit. Allegedly, in some operations, they wore enemy uniforms in order not to be identified.

The Flechas were also mostly armed with the standard small arms in use by the Portuguese Military, including the Heckler & Koch G3 and FN FAL 7.62×51mm battle rifles. They also frequently used captured AK-47 rifles and they showed a special preference for the use of tribal traditional weapons, including spears and the bows and arrows which gave origin to the name of the unit.

== After independence ==
In 1975 a group of ex-Flechas who had fled Mozambique after its Independence formed the insurgent group RENAMO and subsequently fought in the Mozambique Civil War. Other Flechas were enlisted in the Rhodesian Army's Selous Scouts. The South African Alpha Group, later to become 31 Battalion, consisted primarily of former Flechas members

== Other special forces units ==
There were a number of other Portuguese special forces units were unique to the Portuguese Colonial War:

- Special Groups (Grupos Especiais): units similar to the ones used in Angola
- Paratrooper Special Groups (Grupos Especiais Pára-Quedistas): units of volunteer black soldiers that had paratrooper training
- Combat Tracking Special Groups (Grupos Especiais de Pisteiros de Combate): special units trained in tracking

== See also ==
- Koevoet
- Selous Scouts
- RENAMO

== Footnotes ==
=== Works cited ===
- Seegers, Annette (2018) [1st pub. 1986]. "From Liberation to Modernization: Transforming Revolutionary Paramilitary Forces into Standing Professional Armies". In Bruce E. Arlinghaus; Pauline H. Baker (eds.). African Armies: Evolution And Capabilities. Abingdon-on-Thames: Routledge. pp. 52–83. ISBN 978-0-367-02004-0.
