= Exercise REP(MUS) =

Annual military exercise

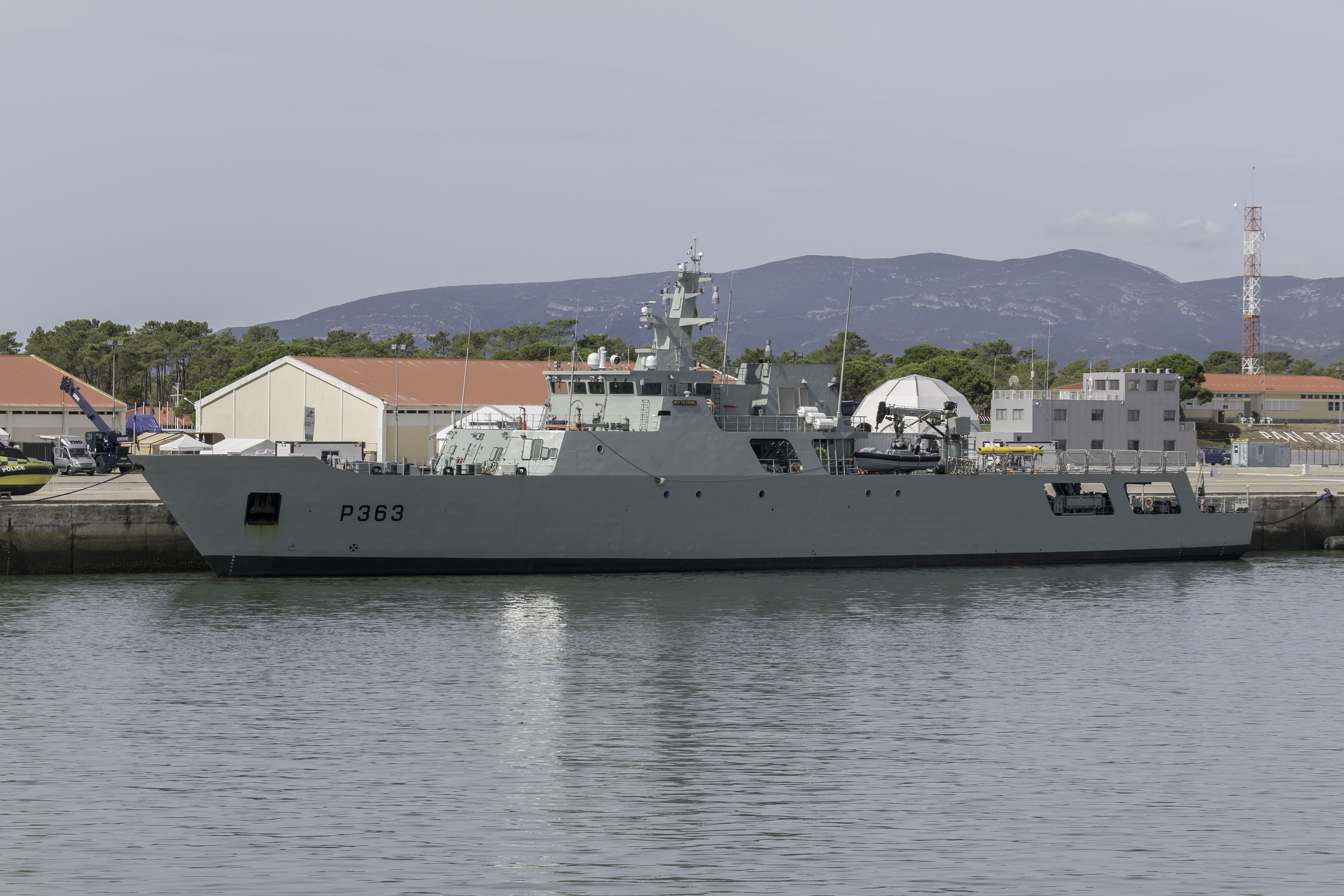
Portuguese NRP Setúbal during REP(MUS) 2021 exercise.

REP(MUS) (Robotic Experimentation and Prototyping using Maritime Uncrewed Systems) is an annual experimentation exercise for Unmanned Maritime Systems organized and hosted by the Portuguese Navy, NATO and Faculty of Engineering - University of Porto, co-organized by the European Defence Agency, with the participation of forces from foreign military forces, universities and tech companies. The exercise has the objective of testing different types of unmanned aerial vehicles, unmanned surface vehicles, unmanned undersea vehicles, and unmanned ground vehicles. Today it is the largest UAV testing exercise, with the participation of several NATO countries. In recent years it has been the largest exercise for experimenting with unmanned vehicles in the world.

== REP(MUS)19 ==
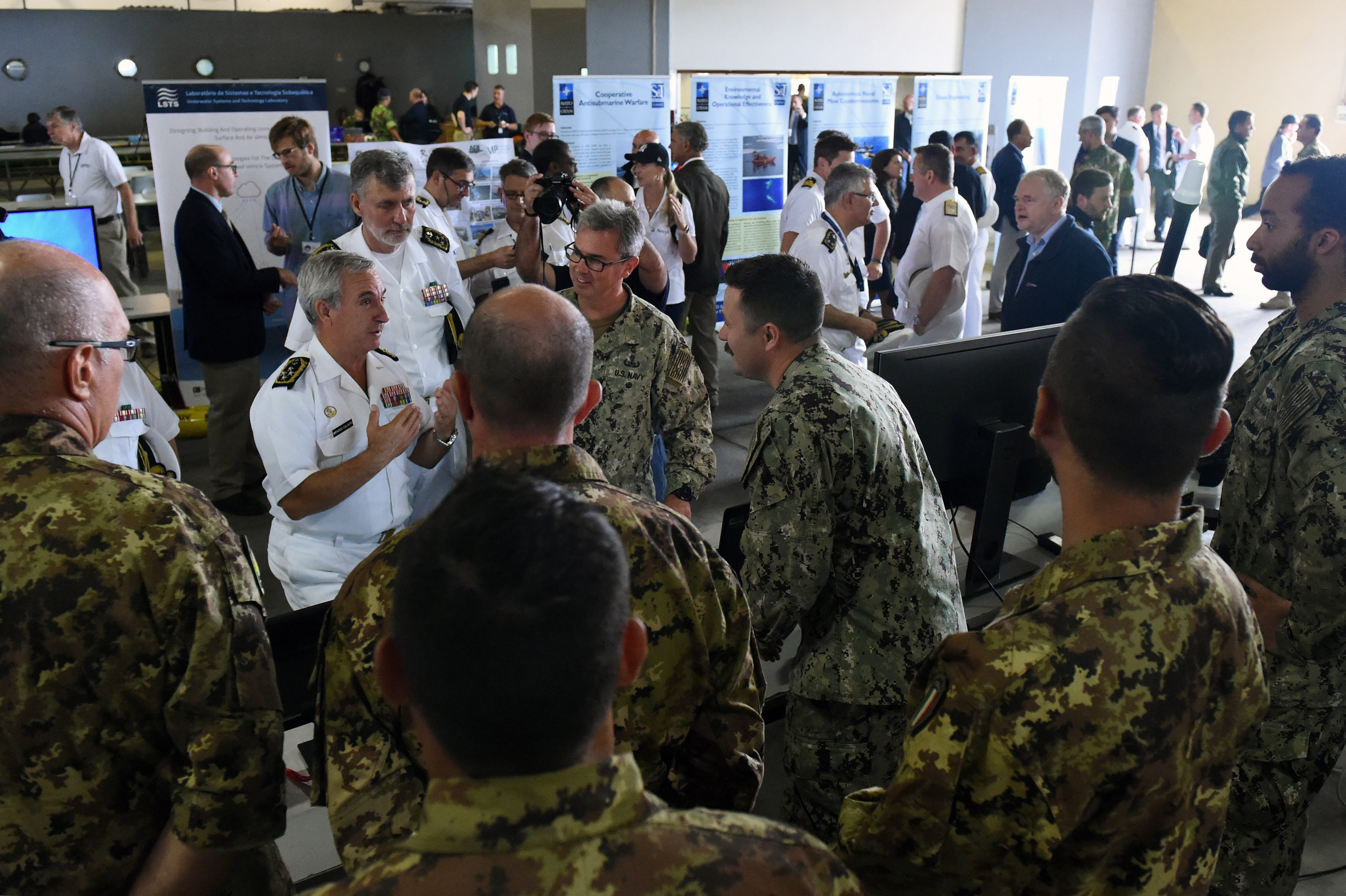
Portugal's Navy Chief of Staff Adm. Mendes Calado and Portuguese Navy Fleet Commander Vice Admiral Henrique Gouveia e Melo during REP(MUS)19

=== Military participants ===
- Belgium;
- Italy;
- Poland;
- Portugal: NRP Tridente, NRP Álvares Cabral, NRP Figueira da Foz, NRP Almirante Gago Coutinho, NRP Dom Carlos I, NRP Andrómeda, NRP Pégaso, Portuguese Marine Corps, Special Actions Detachment and Sappers Divers Group.
- Turkey;
- United Kingdom;
- United States: Naval Sea Systems Command and USS Porter.

=== Civil participants ===
- AeroVironment;
- IAI Elta Systems;
- INESC TEC
- DSTL;

== REP(MUS)20 ==
The REP(MUS)20 exercise was canceled due to the COVID-19 pandemic, and was replaced by two webinars.

== REP(MUS)21 ==
In this edition took part 11 ships, 21 Unmanned aerial vehicles, 32 Unmanned underwater vehicles and 12 Unmanned surface vehicles.

=== Military participants ===
- Australia;
- Belgium;
- Canada;
- Denmark;
- France;
- Germany: FGS Planet;
- Greece;
- Italy: NRV Alliance (A 5345);
- Netherlands: Geosia;
- Norway;
- Poland;
- Portugal: NRP Tridente, NRP Álvares Cabral, NRP Sines, NRP Setúbal, NRP Hidra, NRP Cassiopeia, NRP Dom Carlos I, Portuguese Marine Corps and Sappers Divers Group;
- Romania;
- Spain;
- Turkey;
- United Kingdom;
- United States: USNS Carson City.

== REP(MUS)22 ==
In the 2022 edition, there were 45 unmanned aerial vehicles, 40 unmanned underwater vehicles, 18 unmanned surface vehicles, and 17 military vessels present. It was attended by more than 2000 people from 25 countries, many of them from NATO, as well as companies and universities.

=== Military participants ===
- Australia;
- Belgium;
- Brazil: Participated as observer;
- Canada;
- Denmark;
- France: Commandant Ducuing;
- Germany: FGS Planet;
- Greece;
- Italy: NRV Alliance;
- Netherlands: HNLMS Rotterdam, HNLMS Tromp and Geosia;
- Poland;
- Portugal: NRP Bartolomeu Dias, NRP Arpão, NRP Viana do Castelo, NRP Sines, NRP Hidra, NRP Sagitário, NRP Dom Carlos I, NRP Almirante Gago Coutinho, UAM Macaréu, Portuguese Marine Corps, CEOM;
- Romania: Alexandru CĂTUNEANU;
- Spain: Audaz (P-45);
- Turkey;
- United Kingdom: HMS Lancaster and HMS Hurworth;
- United States: US Navy.

== REP(MUS)23 ==
The exercise took place in September 2023 and was attended by more than 25 Navies, 8 NATO entities and more than 30 companies and universities dedicated to research and development in this area.

=== Military participants ===
- Australia
- Canada
- Denmark: Royal Danish Navy
- France:French Navy (FS PLUTON M62)
- Germany
- Greece
- Italy: Italian Navy (Carabiniere F 593, Stromboli A 5327, Gaeta M 5554)
- Japan
- Latvia
- Netherlands
- Poland
- Portugal: Portuguese Navy (NRP Dom Francisco de Almeida (F334), NRP Setúbal, NRP Sines, NRP Dom Carlos I, NRP Andrómeda, NRP Hidra, NRP Orion)
- Romania;
- Spain: Spanish Navy (Furor P-46, Tambre M-33)
- Turkey
- United Kingdom: Royal Navy (XV Patrick Blackett)
- United States: United States Navy.
- South Korea
- Sweden

=== Civilian participants ===
- Leonardo
- ALSEAMAR;
- Atlas Elektronik;
- Beyond Vision;
- Bundeswehr Technical Center for Ships and Naval Weapons, Maritime Technology and Research
- Centre for Maritime Research and Experimentation (NATO CMRE);
- Connect Robotics;
- EvoLogics GmbH;
- Faculdade de Engenharia da Universidade do Porto (FEUP);
- Fincantieri: with one SAND USV;
- INERC BV
- INESC TEC;
- iXblue: With one Drix USV;
- Malloy Aeronautics
- Maritime Robotics: With Otter USV;
- IQUA Robotics
- MARTAC: With Devil Ray T24 USV;
- NATO Maritime Unmanned Systems Initiative (NATO MUSI);
- Nokia
- OceanScan
- Schiebel: With two Schiebel Camcopter S-100;
- Saab AB with two AUV62-AT
- SEABER;
- SeeByte;
- Shield AI;
- Sonardyne International Ltd
- Sefine Shipyard, Altinova, Yalova, Türkiye;
- Swarming Technologies and Solutions;
- Tekever;
- Teledyne Technologies;
- Thales Edisoft Portugal;
- UAVision;
- Utek;
- Woods Hole Oceanographic Institution: With REMUS autonomous underwater vehicles;
- blueOASIS: With HydroTWIN.

== REP(MUS)24 ==
The 2024 edition has more than 2000 participants from 30 countries. It´s the largest international drone exercise in the world, demonstrating the commitment and collaboration between the nations present for development, in set of these new technologies.

Military participants

- Australia
- Belgium
- Brazil
- Bulgaria
- Canada
- Colombia
- Croatia
- Denmark
- France
- Germany
- Greece
- Finland
- France
- Ireland
- Italy
- Japan
- Lithuania
- Netherlands
- Norway
- Poland
- Portugal: NRP Setúbal
- Romania
- South Korea
- Spain
- Sweden
- Switzerland
- Turkey
- Ukraine
- United States
- United Kingdom

== See also ==
- REMUS (AUV)
