= Edisoft =

Thales Edisoft Portugal
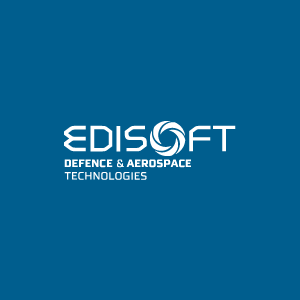
- Company type: Subsidiary
- Industry: Defence software development Naval Defense Systems Air Systems Space Systems
- Headquarters: Portugal
- Parent: Thales Group idD Portugal Defence NAV
- Website: www.edisoft.pt

Thales Edisoft – Thales Edisoft Portugal, S.A. is a company of Thales Group that provides software development, systems engineering, technological consulting, and systems integration. The company develops critical infrastructure solutions across land, maritime, aerospace, and cyberspace domains for both the civil and defense markets. Within the naval sector, Thales Edisoft maintains strategic industrial partnerships with prominent Portuguese shipbuilders, notably working alongside Arsenal do Alfeite and the West Sea Shipyard, the primary contractor responsible for constructing the Viana do Castelo-class patrol vessels for the Portuguese Navy.

The company's operational portfolio spans several specialized business areas focused on high-reliability environments. In the defense and security sectors, it focuses on command and control applications, while its aerospace divisions develop specialized technology for both air traffic systems and international space programs. Furthermore, the company delivers integrated business solutions for complex corporate operations, alongside geographical-based decision systems designed to utilize spatial data and real-time tracking for strategic maritime and territorial surveillance.

== Products ==
=== Naval Defense Systems ===
Sources:

- C4SEA;
- INIMIG;
- OceanEye;
- SAFEPORT;
- CYBER.

=== Air Systems ===
- TOPSKY TOWER;
- TOPSKY AMHS;
- TOPSKY FLOW MANAGER;
- TOWER ONE;
- NAVAIDS.

=== Space Systems ===
Sources:

- ESA tracking Station;
- Earth Observation Station;
- Galileo Sensor Station (GSS);
- Real Time Executive for Multiprocessor Systems' (RTEMS).
