= Viana do Castelo (disambiguation) =

Viana do Castelo is a town and a municipality in northern Portugal. It may also refer to:

- Viana do Castelo District, in northwest Portugal
- Roman Catholic Diocese of Viana do Castelo, Portugal
- Viana do Castelo-class patrol vessel, a vessel of the Portuguese Navy
