= ENVC Shipyard =

Portuguese shipyard

Estaleiros Navais de Viana do Castelo (Viana do Castelo Naval Shipyards)

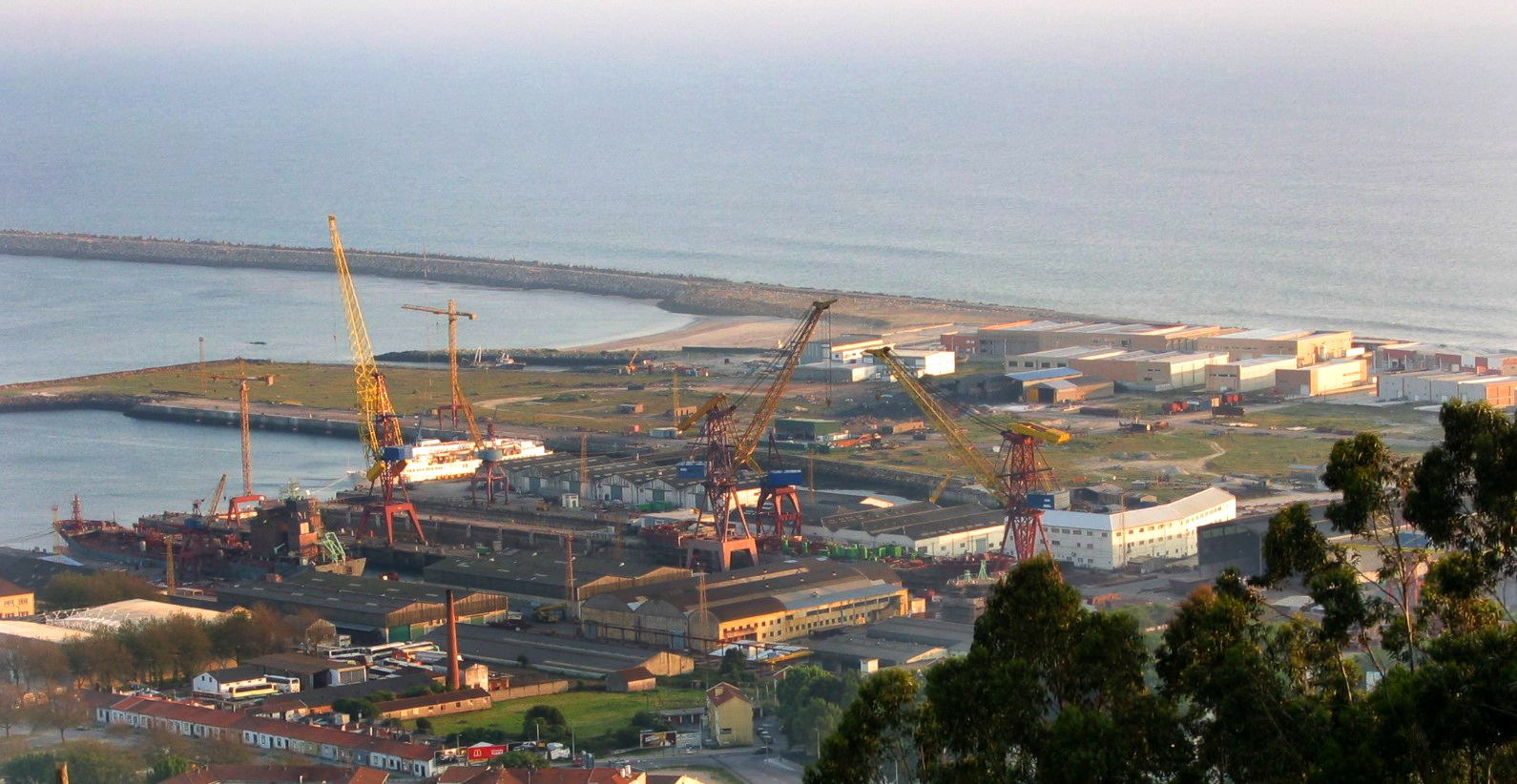
- ENVC in May 2004.
- Industry: Shipbuilding
- Founded: 1944
- Headquarters: Viana do Castelo, Portugal
- Products: Container ships Oil tankers Patrol boats
- Services: Shipbuilding
- Owner: State owned
- Number of employees: 608 (2013)
- Parent: EMPORDEF
- Website: http://www.envc.pt/

Estaleiros Navais de Viana do Castelo (ENVC) is a medium-sized shipyard in business since 1944, located in the town of Viana do Castelo, on the Atlantic Coast in the very north of Portugal. Occupying an area of 400,000 square metres and employing 625 people, it is a major Portuguese shipbuilder. In 2013 its assets and operations were sub-licensed to Martifer, which renamed them to West Sea Shipyard.

Up to the present, the yard has delivered more than 220 vessels including barges, tugboats, ferry boats, fishing vessels, general cargo and bulk carriers, container ships, oil and chemical tankers, LPG's, cement carriers and warships.

== History ==
The shipyards were funded on 3 June 1944 as a private limited liability company with a capital of 750,000$00 escudos as a part of a Portuguese government program to modernize the national fishing fleet. They were founded by a group of technicians and workers from the shipyards of the port of Lisbon and two of the first investors were Vasco D'Orey and João Alves Cerqueira, from the cod fishing industry. By 1946, the shipyards were accredited by Lloyd's Register and in 1948 the company delivered its first three ships.

In May 1949, the ENVC were constituted as an anonymous society with a PTE 37,000,000$00 capital. In 1950 the company H. Parry & Son, Lda. became the main shareholder and in 1971 the CUF group took over as the major shareholder.

In 1975, following the Carnation Revolution the previous year, the shipyards were nationalized and became a state-owned company with a capital of PTE 330,000,000$00. In 1987 its capital was changed to 3 million contos.

In 1991 the company was made an anonymous society with the Portuguese government remaining the major shareholder.

In 2004, the Portuguese ministry of defense ordered eight patrol ships of the Viana do Castelo class from the shipyard. These faced delays and only two ships would be completed by 2013.

In 2012, the shipyard was officially placed under a privatization process. By 2013, due to ongoing financial difficulties, ENVC was declared in a difficult economic situation, leading to its eventual bankruptcy and liquidation. Following this, a concession was granted to the Martifer Group to manage the shipyards, with plans to revive shipbuilding operations. Under this concession valid until 2031, the group pays annually 415 thousand euros to the Portuguese state.

On December 20, 2013, MEP Ana Gomes filed a criminal complaint with the Attorney General's Office over the ENVC sub-concession to Ria/Martifer Energy, requesting the European Commission to suspend it.

In November 2014, the European Parliament rejected a request to lift the parliamentary immunity of MEP Ana Gomes. This decision prevented Gomes from facing trial in Portugal for defamation in a case brought by Defense Minister José Pedro Aguiar-Branco, following her statements on the government's decision to privatize the Viana do Castelo Shipyards. After the vote, Aguiar-Branco remarked that her accusations were personal and unrelated to her role as an MEP, suggesting that the European Parliament allows MEPs to speak without consequence.

On December 17, 2017, it was announced that, at the time of its formal dissolution, the Viana do Castelo Shipyards would report net losses exceeding €700 million. The formal dissolution was scheduled for March 31, 2018.

== Ships built ==
Between 1944 and 1974, 90% of ships were delivered to Portuguese shipowners and 50% were fishing vessels. During the late 1970s and 1980s, the Soviet Union became the shipyard's largest market, while during the 1990s, Germany became the largest contractor.

Below are some of the ships that ENVC have built since 1948.

No.	Type	Name	IMO No.	Company	Country	DWT	Delivered
1	Fishing trawler	Senhor dos Mareantes		Empresa de Pesca de Viana	Portugal	1,480	1948
2	Fishing trawler	Senhora das Candeias		Empresa de Pesca de Viana	Portugal	1,480	1948
3	Fishing trawler	São Gonçalinho		Empresa de Pesca de Aveiro	Portugal	1,480	1948
4	Fishing trawler	João Martins		Soc. Nacional Armadores Bacalhau	Portugal	1,556	1952
5	Fishing trawler	Cabo Branco		Soc. Comercial Marítima	Portugal	284	1948
6	Fishing trawler	Sta. Teresinha		Soc. Pesca Sta. Fé	Portugal	293	1951
7	Fishing trawler	Ilha do Corvo		Soc. Armadores Pesca Arrasto	Portugal	293	1951
8	Fishing trawler	Alcyon		Comp. Port. Pesca	Portugal	295	1951
9	Fishing trawler	Ilha Brava		Soc. Armadores Pesca Arrasto	Portugal	299	1951
10	Fishing trawler	Ilha do Pico		Soc. Armadores Pesca Arrasto	Portugal	298	1951
11	Fishing trawler	Rio Lima		Empresa de Pesca de Viana	Portugal	1,220	1952
12	General cargo	Corubal		Overseas Ministry	Portugal	32	1952
13	General cargo	Formosa		Overseas Ministry	Guinea-Bissau	32	1952
14	General cargo	Funchalense		Empresa Navegação Madeirense	Portugal	582	1953
15	Hospital ship	Gil Eanes	5130587	Grémio dos Armadores de Navios de Pesca do Bacalhau	Portugal	2,274	1955
16	Ferry boat	Cedros		Empresa Insulana Navegação	Portugal	351	1955
17	Ferry boat	Arnel		Empresa Insulana Navegação	Portugal	351	1955
18	Barge	Fonte Da Atalaia		M. J. Pereira	Portugal	420	1953
19	Tugboat	Foz do Lima		Soc. Coop. dos Catreiros do Porto de Lisboa	Portugal		1953
20	Fishing vessel	Allan Villiers		Bacalhau Portugal	Guinea-Bissau	1,327	1952
22	Fishing vessel	San Tiago		Soc. Nacional Armadores Bacalhau	Portugal	1,288	1955
23	Ferry boat	Eborense		Parc. Vapor Lisbon	Portugal	281	1954
24	Patrol boat	Brava		US Government	United States	130	1956
25	Patrol boat	Fogo		US Government	United States	131	1957
27	Fishing vessel	Sra. Boa Viagem		Atlântica Companhia Portuguesa de Pesca	Portugal	1,273	1956
28	Fishing vessel	S. Gabriel		Soc. Luso Brasileira	Portugal	1,307	1956
29	Tanker	Shell Tagus		Shell Portugal	Portugal	1,334	1957
36	Ferry boat	Alentejense		Soc. Maritima Transportes	Portugal	82	1957
37	Ferry boat	Sesimbrense		Soc. Maritima Transportes	Portugal	76	1958
42	General cargo	Lobito		Companhia Colonial de Navegação	Portugal	9,975	1959
47	General cargo	Ponta Garça		Companhia de Navegação Carregadores Açorianos	Portugal	2,739	1960
48	Ferry boat	Estremadura		Portuguese Railway Company	Portugal	162	1961
49	Ferry boat	Algarve		Portuguese Railway Company	Portugal	153	1961
50	Replenishment oiler	S. Gabriel		Navy Ministry	Portugal	9,854	1963
51	Fishing trawler	Vasco D'Orey		Empresa de Pesca de Viana	Portugal	1,819	1961
52	Fishing trawler	Sta. Maria Madalena		Empresa de Pesca de Viana	Portugal	1,825	1961
58	Tugboat	Monte Castro		JAP Douro Leixões	Portugal		1963
62	Fishing trawler	M. Teixeira Vilarinho	6413833	José M. Vilarinho	Portugal	1,762	1964
63	Warship	Alm. Magalhães Correa		Navy Ministry	Portugal		1968
64	Cement carrier	Cecil Outão		Secil	Portugal	944	1964
65	Tanker	Rocas		Sacor Marítima	Portugal	1,850	1965
70	Tugboat	Atomo Man		Soc. Coop. dos Catreiros do Porto de Lisboa	Portugal		1965
71	General cargo	Porto		Companhia Colonial de Navegação	Portugal	12,969	1968
73	Gas carrier	Cidla	6708692	Sacor Marítima	Portugal	1,841	1966
74	Gas carrier	Bandim	6809599	Sacor Marítima	Portugal	1,841	1967
77	Ferry boat	Minho		Portuguese Railway Company	Portugal	162	1968
78	Ferry boat	Tras-Os-Montes		Portuguese Railway Company	Portugal	162	1968
83	General cargo	Malange		Companhia Colonial de Navegação	Portugal	14,813	1971
84	Ferry boat	Lagos		Portuguese Railway Company	Portugal	153	1970
85	Ferry boat	Alentejo		Portuguese Railway Company	Portugal	153	1970
87	Container ship	Erika Fisser	7116781	Zaanlandse Scheepsbouw Maatschappij	Netherlands	6,200	1971
88	Container ship	Imela Fisser		Zaanlandse Scheepsbouw Maatschappij	Netherlands	6,200	1971
89	Container ship	Elizabeth Fisser		Zaanlandse Scheepsbouw Maatschappij	Netherlands	6,200	1972
101	Chemical tanker	Stolt Avance	7416935	Stolt Nielsen	Norway	23,300	1977
102	Chemical tanker	Stolt Avenir	7416947	Stolt Nielsen	Norway	23,300	1978
103	RORO	Farman	7619525	R.R.R. Intern. LDA Italia	Italy	3,890	1979
104	RORO	Fara	7619537	R.R.R. Intern. LDA Italia	Italy	3,890	1980
105	General cargo	Leninsky Komsomol		Sudoimport	Soviet Union	3,146	1979
106	General cargo	Druzkha Naradov	7636755	Sudoimport	Soviet Union	3,146	1979
107	General cargo	Znamia Oktiabria	7636767	Sudoimport	Soviet Union	3,146	1979
108	General cargo	Sovetskaya Rodina	7636860	Sudoimport	Soviet Union	3,146	1979
111	Fishing vessel	Mar		Utver H/F Olafsvik	Iceland	370	1980
112	Fishing vessel	Jon Baldvinsson		Baejarvigerd Reyk	Iceland	370	1980
114	Tanker	Galp Sines	8001103	Sacor Marítima	Portugal	18,732	1982
115	Tanker	Galp Leixões	8001115	Sacor Marítima	Portugal	18,732	1983
118	General cargo	XVII Syezd Profsoyuzov	8035219	Sudoimport	Soviet Union	3,134	1982
119	General cargo	XI Pyatiletka	8101422	Sudoimport	Soviet Union	3,134	1982
120	General cargo	65 Let Sovietskoy Vlasti		Sudoimport	Soviet Union	3,134	1983
123	Chemical tanker	Global Rio	8220589	Global Transporte Oceânico	Brazil	15,089	1985
124	Chemical tanker	Global Maceió	8220577	Global Transporte Oceânico	Brazil	15,089	1986
125	Barge	Rita		Socamar	Portugal	4,832	1982
126	Barge	Rute		Socamar	Portugal	4,832	1983
127	Barge	Rota		Socamar	Portugal	4,712	1983
128	Barge	Rumo		Socamar	Portugal	4,712	1983
129	Barge	Raio		Socamar	Portugal	4,712	1983
169	General cargo	Linde II		Paphian Ship. Fisser	Germany	6,340	1993
178	Cement carrier	Koralia	8918409	Bambury Tank. Hold. (Nauru) CO	Germany	8,500	1995
184	Chemical tanker	Multitank Britannia	9114751	Tankreederei Ahreinkiel GMBH	Germany	5,846	1996
185	Chemical tanker	Multitank Bahia	9114763	Tankreederei Ahreinkiel GMBH	Germany	5,846	1996
186	Chemical tanker	Multitank Bracaria	9114775	Tankreederei Ahreinkiel GMBH	Germany	5,846	1997
191	Chemical tanker	Multitank Brasilia	9125645	Tankreederei Ahreinkiel GMBH	Germany	5,846	1997
192	Chemical tanker	Multitank Bolognia	9140815	Tankreederei Ahreinkiel GMBH	Germany	5,846	1997
193	Chemical tanker	Multitank Badenia	9140827	Tankreederei Ahreinkiel GMBH	Germany	5,846	1997
194	Chemical tanker	Multitank Balearia	9147461	Tankreederei Ahreinkiel GMBH	Germany	5,846	1997
195	Chemical tanker	Multitank Batavia	9154323	Tankreederei Ahreinkiel GMBH	Germany	5,846	1998
204	Container ship	Insular	9150420	Transinsular	Portugal	6,700	1998
206	Chemical tanker	Aurora	9187497	PCS Phosphate Company, INC.	United States	21,500	2000
211	Chemical tanker	FS Vanessa	9231602	Fouquet Sacop	France	19,117	2002
212	Chemical tanker	FS Thais	9262259	Fouquet Sacop	France	19,117	2003
213	Reefer	Carmel Ecofresh	9267534	Orizont Schiffahrtsgesellschaft mbG	Germany	15,000	2003
214	Reefer	Carmel Bio-Top	9267546	Orizont Schiffahrtsgesellschaft mbG	Germany	15,000	2004
215	Container ship	Heinrich J	9157868	MPC Munchmeyer, Petersen GmbH & CO. KG	Germany	6,700	1998
216	Container ship	Michael J	9164421	MPC Munchmeyer, Petersen GmbH & CO. KG	Germany	6,700	1998
224	Chemical tanker	Kiisla	9267558	Fortum Oil Oyj	Finland	14,000	2004
225	Chemical tanker	Suula	9267560	Fortum Oil Oyj	Finland	14,000	2005
227	Chemical tanker	FS Philippine	9310305	Fouquet Sacop	France	15,500	2005
234	Passenger ship	Algarve Cruiser	9329344	Douro Azul	Portugal	90	2005
235	Passenger ship	Douro Queen	9329356	Douro Azul	Portugal	90	2005
237	RORO/Ferry	Lobo Marinho	9267390	Porto Santo Line	Portugal	800	2003
238	Warship	NRP Viana do Castelo	4610625	Navy Ministry	Portugal	1,600	2011
254	General cargo	Industrial Eagle	9407574	Schiffahrtgesellschaft mbH & Co. KG MS “APUS J”	Germany	10,000	2008
255	General cargo	Industrial Egret	9407586	MS “BELLATRIX J” Schiffahrtsgesellschaft mbH & Co. KG	Germany	10,000	2009

== See also ==
- Shipbuilding
- EMPORDEF
- Martifer
- Viana do Castelo-class patrol vessel
- List of shipbuilders and shipyards
- Arsenal do Alfeite
- Portuguese Navy
