= Babadag Wind Farm =

Wind farm in Romania

- Official name: Parc Eolian Babadag
- Country: Romania
- Location: Babadag, Tulcea County
- Coordinates: 44°54′06″N 28°41′23″E
- Status: Operational
- Construction began: April, 2010
- Commission date: 2011
- Construction cost: €23 million
- Owner: Martifer
- Operator: Eviva Nalbant

Wind farm
- Type: Onshore
- Hub height: 79 m (259 ft)
- Rotor diameter: 88 m (289 ft)
- Site area: 260 ha (640 acres)
- Site elevation: 70–180 m (230–590 ft)

Power generation
- Units operational: 20 X 2.1 MW
- Make and model: Suzlon Energy: Suzlon S88
- Nameplate capacity: 42 MW

The Babadag Wind Farm (also referred as Renewable Energy Production Facilities in Babadag; Romanian: Parc Eolian Babadag) is a wind farm in Babadag, Tulcea County, Romania. The wind farm is owned and operated by Eviva Nalbant, a subsidiary of Portuguese multinational company Martifer. The project was developed as a joint implementation project. The wind park was financed with €23 million loan from Banca Comercială Română.

The project started in 2007 when Eviva Nalbant conducted a preliminary wind resource assessment and pre-feasibility assessment. The concession contract with Babadag Municipality was signed in September 2007. In 2008, a turbine supply contract was signed with Suzlon Energy. In April 2009, the project was revised and optimized based on on-site measurement data. A construction permit was issued in March 2010 and construction started in April 2010.

The wind farm is located on 260 hectares (640 acres). It contains two locations: Babadag I (16 turbines) and Babadag II (four turbines). Originally, the project was to include 48 wind turbines with a nominal capacity 1 MW each. However, the project was delayed and it was later change to have 20 Suzlon S88 turbines with a nameplate capacity of 2.1 MW each. The hub-height is 79 metres (259 ft) and the rotor diameter is 88 metres (289 ft).
