= West Sea Shipyard =

Shipyard in Portugal

- Native name: Portuguese: West Sea - Estaleiros Navais, Lda.
- Type: Private limited company
- Industry: Shipbuilding
- Founded: 2014; 12 years ago
- Headquarters: Viana do Castelo, Viana do Castelo, Alto Minho, Northern Portugal, Portugal
- Area served: Worldwide
- Products: Ships
- Owner: Martifer (100%)
- Number of employees: 400
- Parent: Martifer
- Website: west-sea.pt

West Sea Shipyard is a shipbuilding company of the Martifer Group, created in 2014 after the extinction of ENVC Shipyard. West Sea is dedicated to the construction of various types of ships, such as cruise ships and offshore patrol vessels. Since 2014 it has built more than 18 ships and repaired more than 50 ships, such as container ships, tankers, platform supply vessels, cargo ships, cruise ships, reefer ships and tugs.

== Ships Built ==
List of vessels built at West Sea Shipyards:

Vessel name	Image	Year	Client
River Cruise
Viking Osfrid	(lustrative Image)	2016	International Mystic Sails, Ltd.
Scenic Azure	(lustrative Image)	2016	Waratah Unipessoal Lda.
Douro Elegance	(lustrative Image)	2017	Priority Dolphin, S.A.
Douro Serenity	(lustrative Image)	2017	Priority Dolphin, S.A.
Emerald Radiance	(lustrative Image)	2017	Waratah Unipessoal Lda.
Douro Splendour	(lustrative Image)	2018	Priority Dolphin, S.A.
Amadouro	(lustrative Image)	2019	Tenderness Winds - Unipessoal, Lda.
A Rosa Alva	(lustrative Image)	2019	Tenderness Winds - Unipessoal, Lda.
Viking Helgrim	(lustrative Image)	2019	International Mystic Sails, Ltd.
São Gabriel	(lustrative Image)	2020	Douro Azul / Uniworld
Avalon Alegria	(lustrative Image)	2023	Avalon Waterways
Douro Estrela	(lustrative Image)	2024	APT Luxury Travel
AmaSintra	(lustrative Image)	2025	Douro Azul
Dredge Vessel
José Duarte		2018	Dragus Int, Lda
Military Vessel
NRP Sines (P362)		2018	Portuguese Navy / Ministry of National Defence
NRP Setúbal (P363)		2018	Portuguese Navy / Ministry of National Defence
Artic cruise vessel
World Explorer		2019	Mystic Cruises
World Voyager		2020	Mystic Cruises
World Navigator		2021	Mystic Cruises
World Traveller		2022	Mystic Cruises
World Seeker		2025	Mystic Cruises

== Ships Ordered ==
Vessel name	Image	Status	Year	Client	Notes
Military Vessel					
NRP Funchal (P364)		Under construction	2027	Portuguese Navy / Ministry of National Defence	
NRP Aveiro (P365)			2028	Portuguese Navy / Ministry of National Defence	
NRP ? (P366)			2029	Portuguese Navy / Ministry of National Defence	
NRP ? (P367)			2029	Portuguese Navy / Ministry of National Defence	
NRP ? (P368)			2030	Portuguese Navy / Ministry of National Defence	
NRP ? (P369)			2030	Portuguese Navy / Ministry of National Defence	
Artic cruise vessel					
World Adventurer		Under construction	2026	Mystic Cruises	
World Discoverer		Under construction	2027	Mystic Cruises	
River Cruise					
Estrela			2025	Australian Pacific Touring	
Cruise
Sefu			2027	Ryobi Holdings	

== Gallery ==
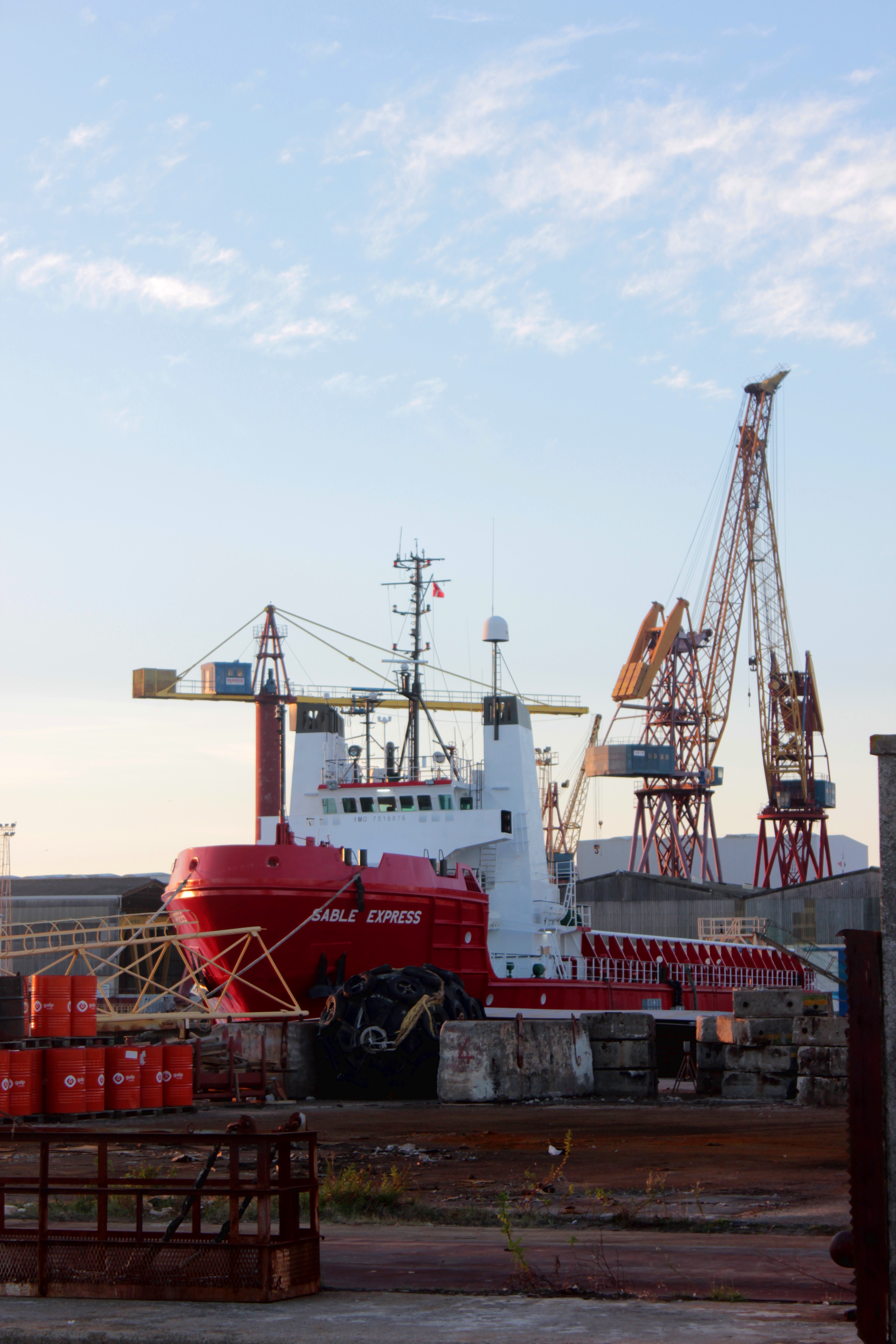

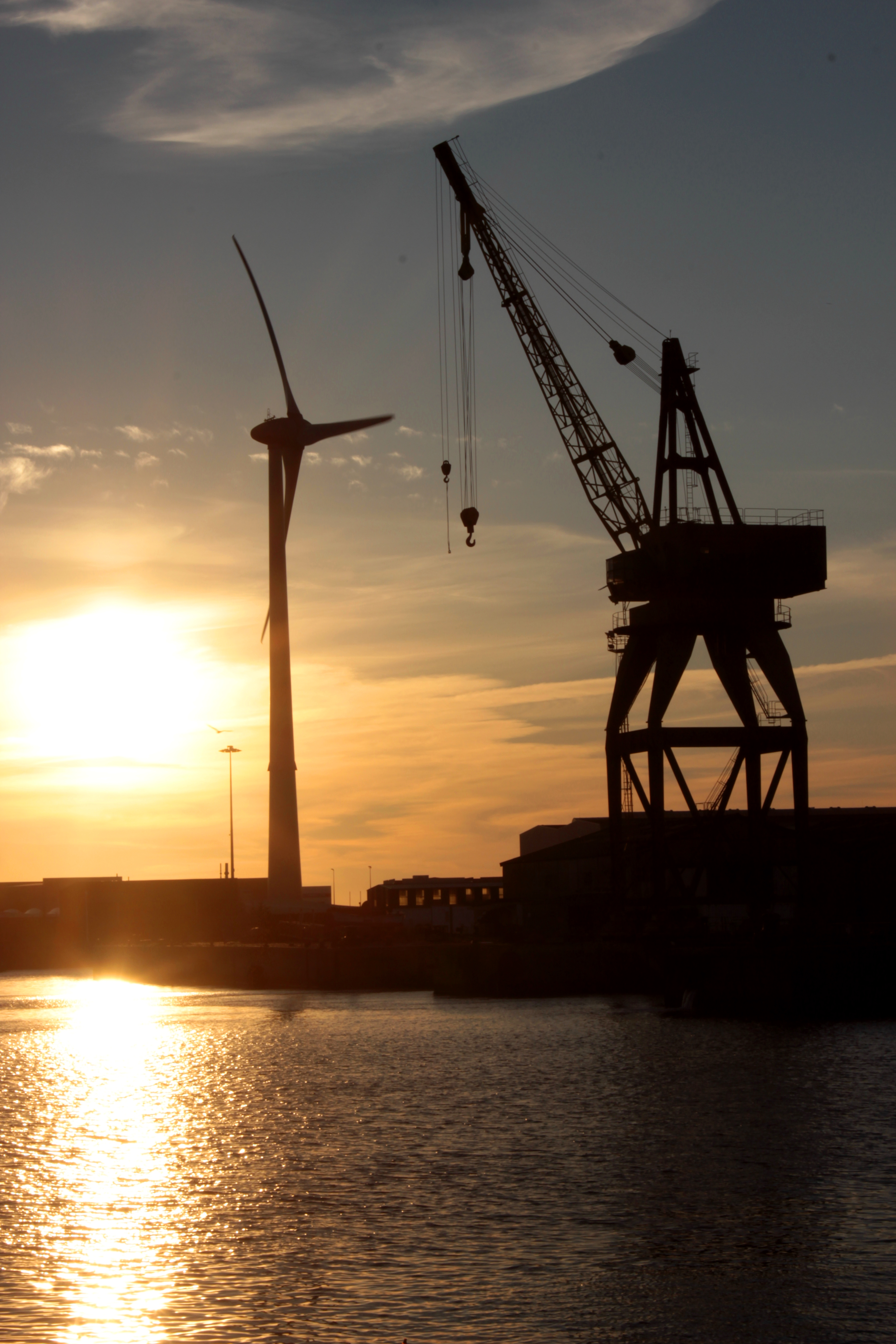

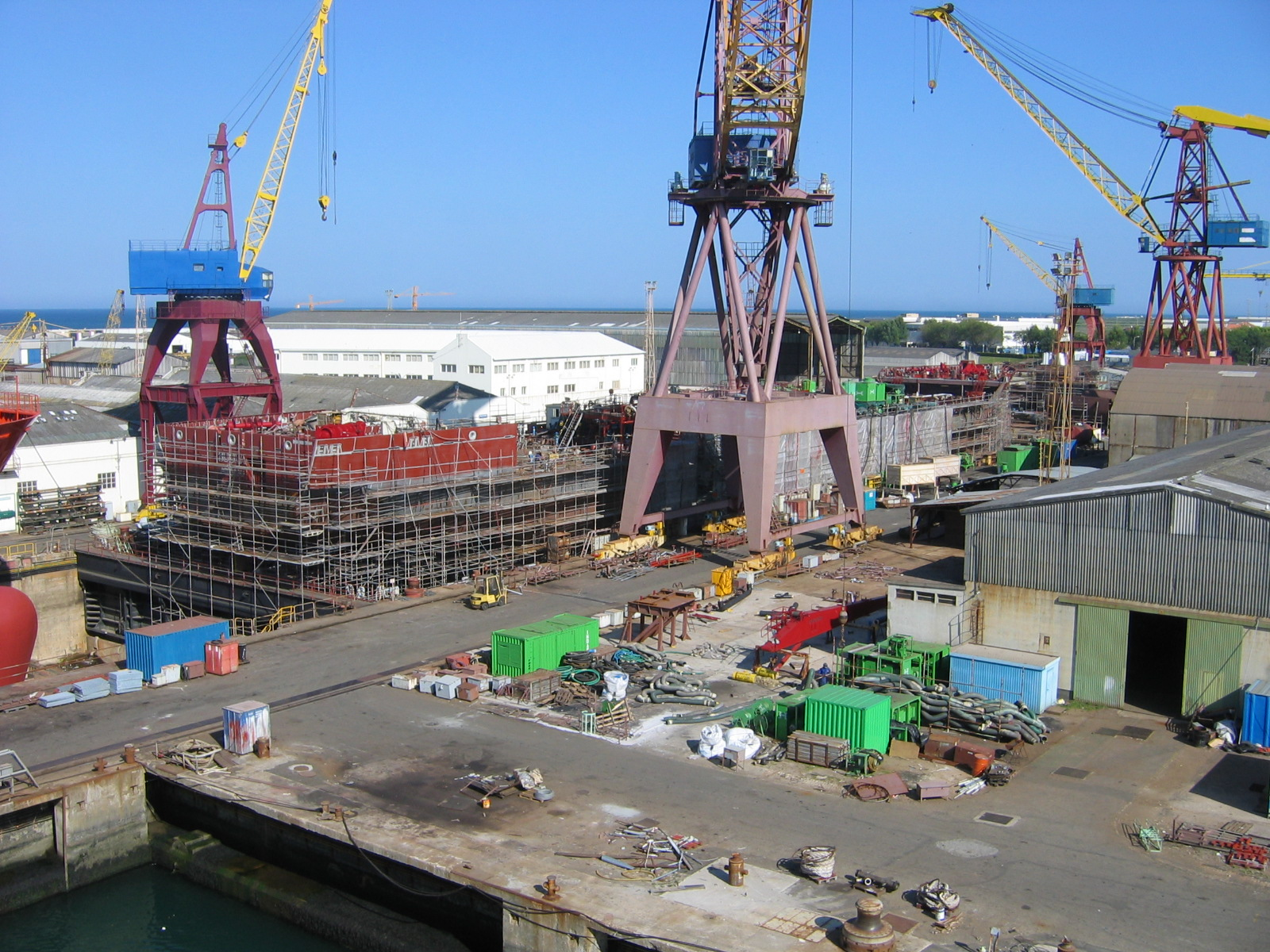

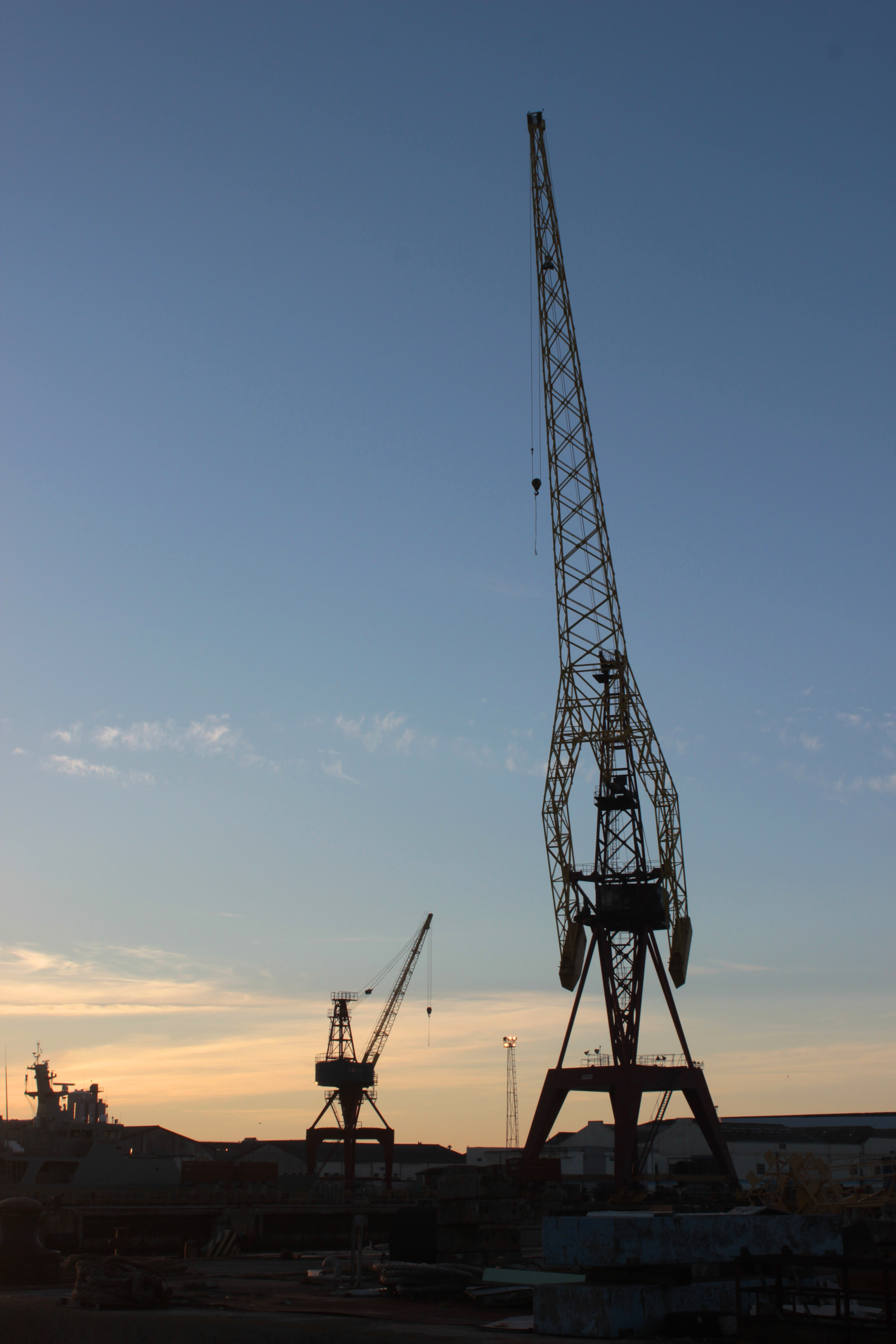

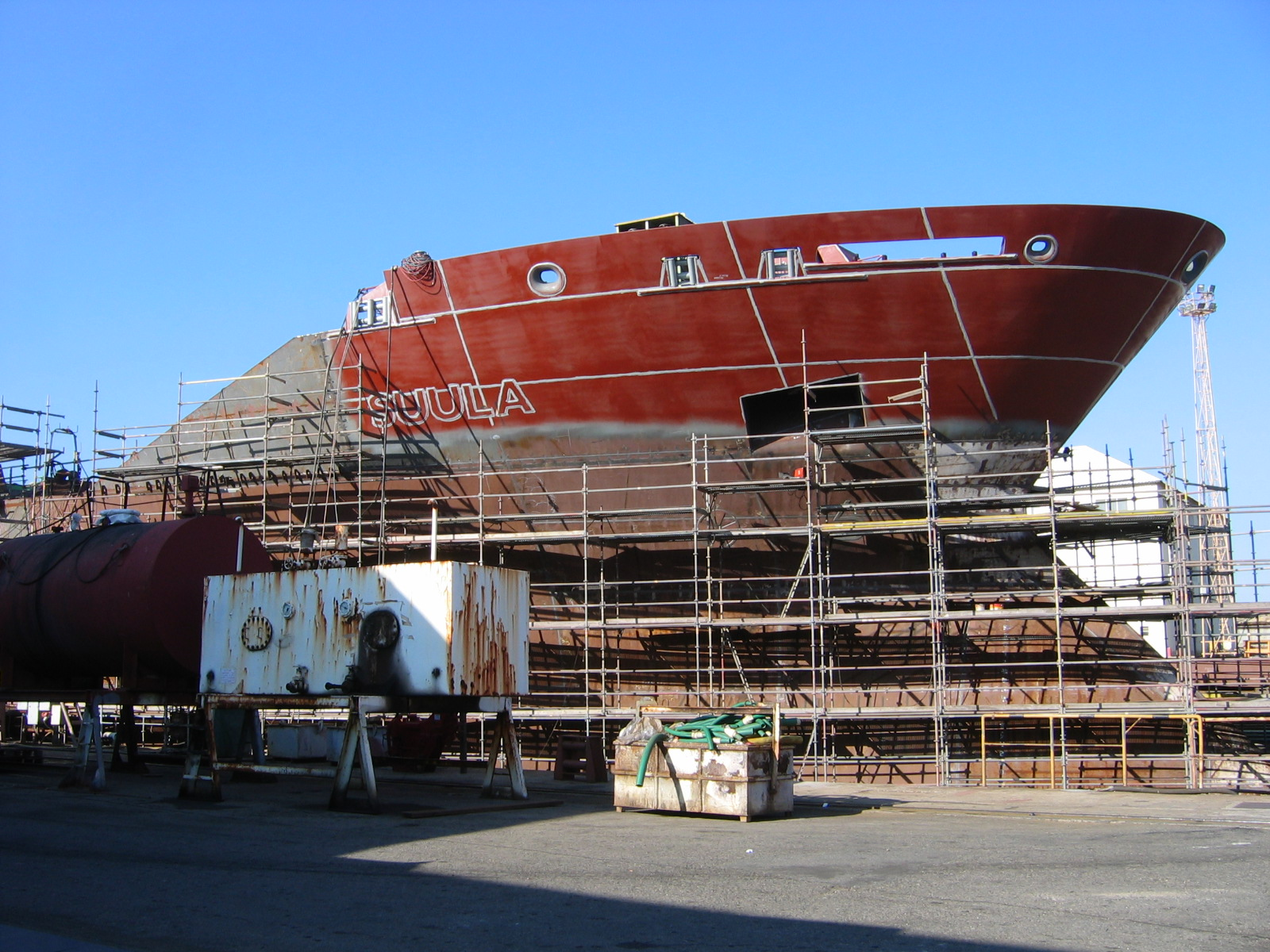

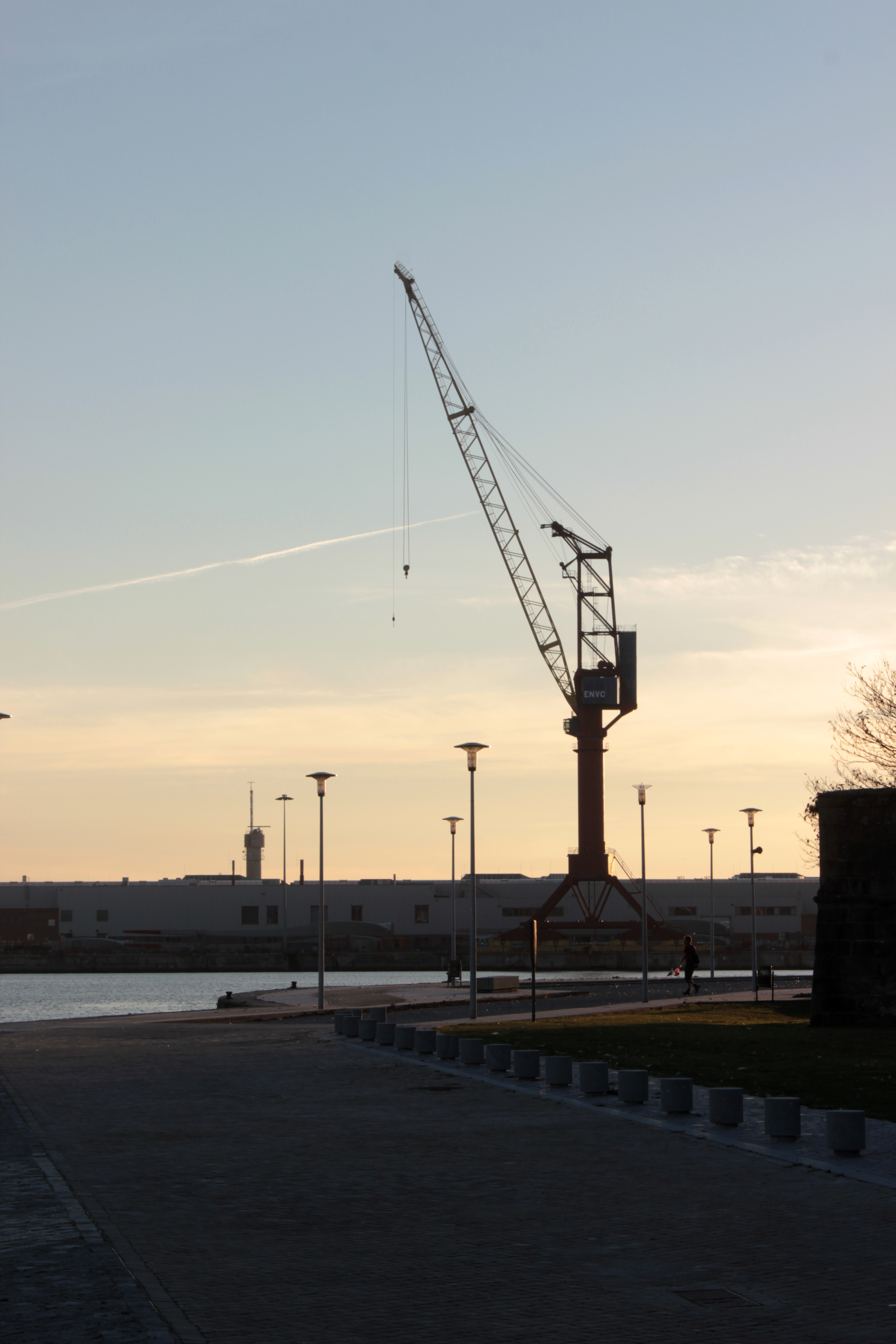

== See also ==
- ENVC Shipyard
- Martifer
