= REMUS (vehicle) =

Autonomous underwater vehicle series

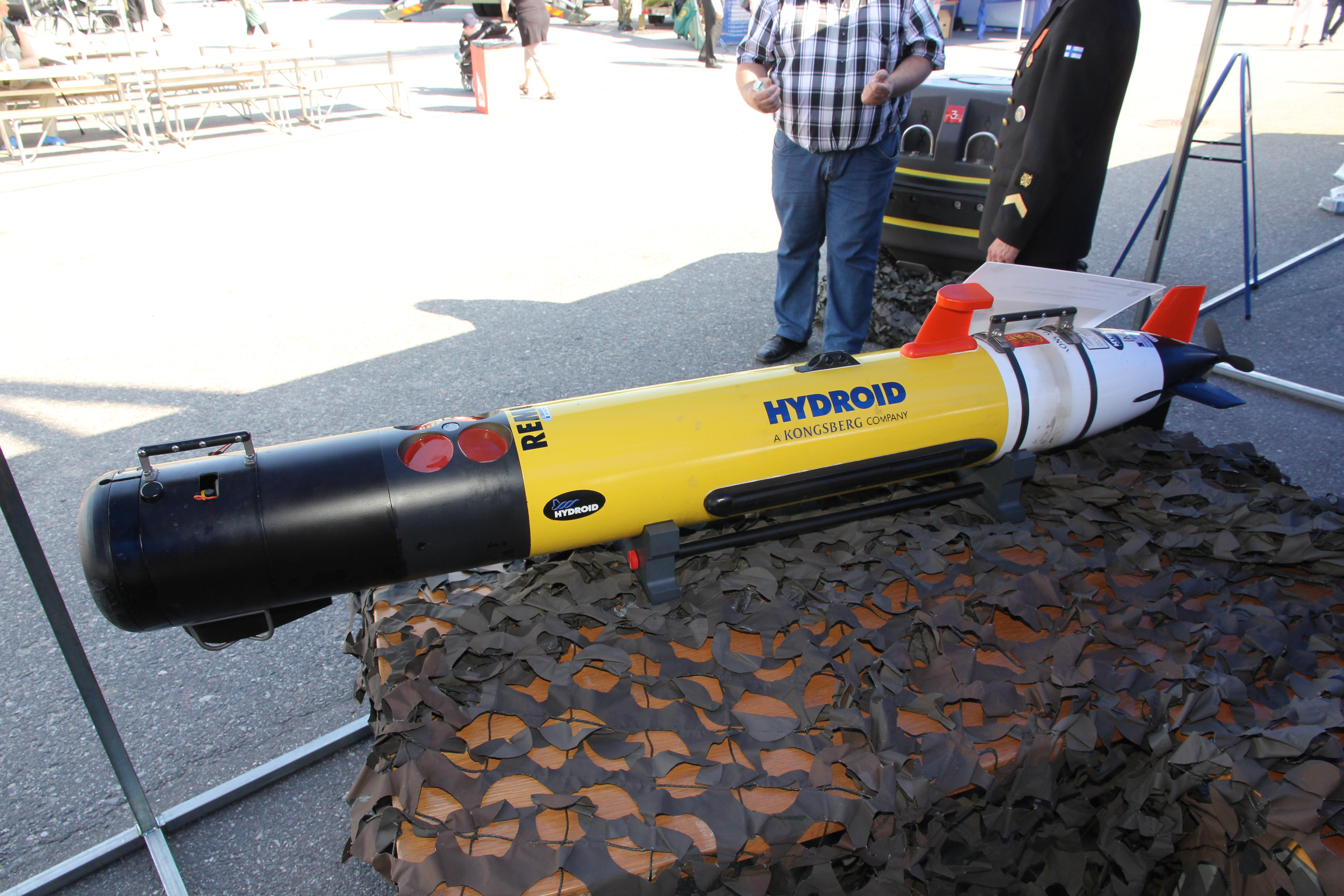
REMUS 100 used by Finnish Navy

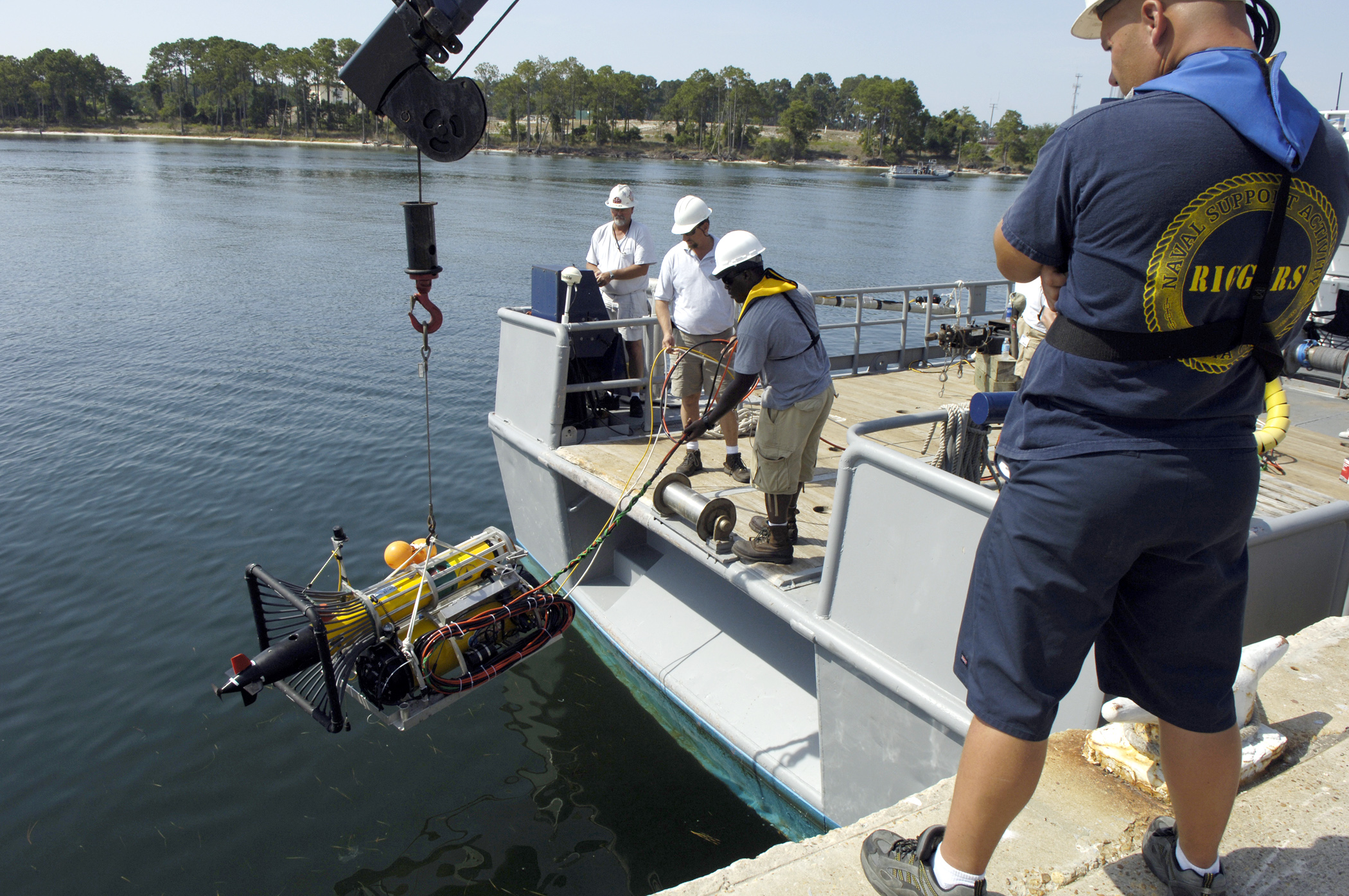
Woods Hole Oceanographic Institution (WHOI) REMUS 100 with autonomous docking station (2007)

The REMUS (Remote Environmental Monitoring UnitS) series is autonomous underwater vehicles (AUVs) made by the Woods Hole Oceanographic Institution and designed by their Oceanographic Systems Lab (OSL). More recently REMUS vehicles have been manufactured by the spinoff company Hydroid Inc, which was a wholly owned subsidiary of Kongsberg Maritime. Hydroid was acquired by Huntington Ingalls Industries (HII) in March 2020. The series is designed to be low cost, they have shared control software and electronic subsystems and can be operated from a laptop computer. They are used by civilians for seafloor mapping, underwater surveying, and search and recovery as well as by several navies for mine countermeasures missions.

== Models ==
There are a number of variants of the REMUS; all are torpedo-shaped vessels with reconfigurable sensors.

=== REMUS 6000 ===
The largest model is the REMUS 6000 at 3.84 metres (12.6 ft) long and 71 centimetres (28 in) in diameter; it is named after its maximum diving depth of 6000m. It can travel at speeds of up to 5 knots (9.3 km/h) and has an endurance of up to 22 hours. It was developed through cooperation between the Naval Oceanographic Office, the Office of Naval Research, and the Woods Hole Oceanographic Institution (WHOI).

In 2018 the Japan Agency for Marine-Earth Science and Technology (JAMSTEC) received an order of New Generation REMUS 6000 AUVs. The New Generation REMUS 6000 is based on the legacy REMUS 6000 platform with "a modular architecture that allows for the addition of multiple payloads including customer sensor packages, forward fins and additional battery sections.” Hydroid also claims that the New Generation model has increased endurance.

=== REMUS 620 ===
In November 2022, the development of the REMUS 620 was announced. It is an enhanced version of the REMUS 300, built to the same size as the REMUS 600. It has a battery endurance of up to 110 hours and a range of up to 275 nmi (509 km), depending on installed modules, and a sprint speed of 8 knots (15 km/h). With a synthetic-aperture sonar installed, battery life is reduced to 78 hours with a range of 200 nmi (370 km). Design missions include mine countermeasures, hydrographic surveys, intelligence collection, surveillance, cyber warfare and electronic warfare. It can also launch smaller UUVs or UAVs. It can be launched from submarines, surface ships, small manned or unmanned craft, and helicopters. It can be recovered underwater by submarines, and recovery back into torpedo tubes is being developed at Woods Hole.

=== REMUS 600 ===
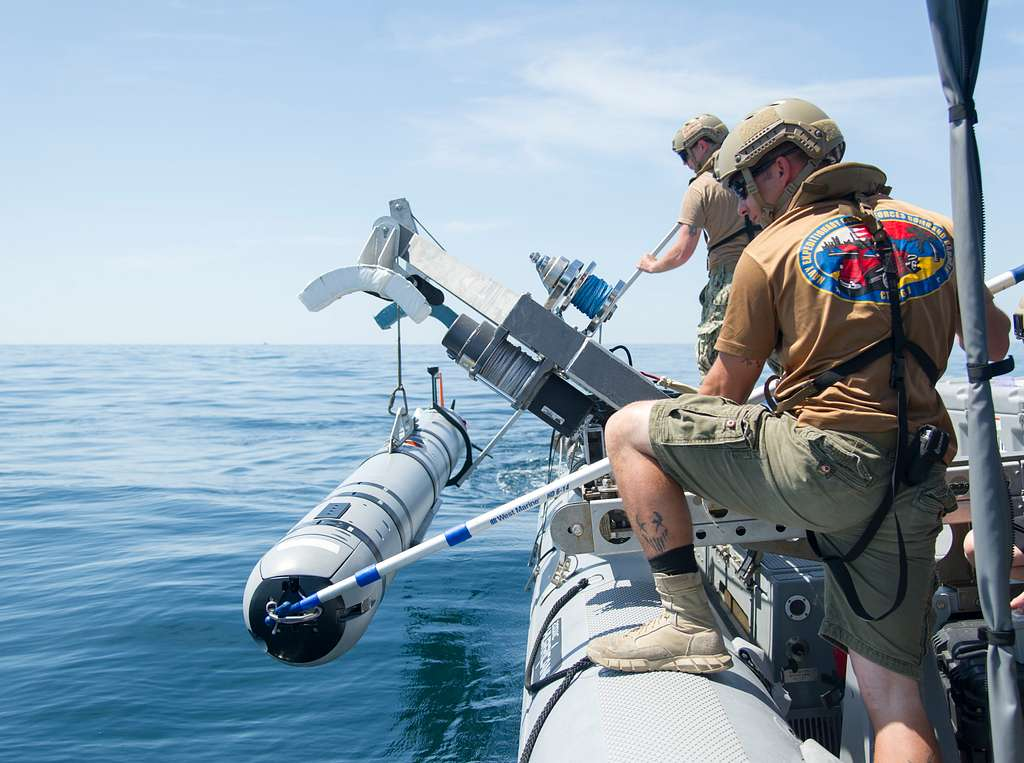
US Navy sailors lower a REMUS 600 into the water during a mine countermeasures exercise

The midsized REMUS 600 was previously known as the REMUS 12.75, so called due to its 12.75-inch (32.4 cm) diameter. It was renamed to the 600 to correspond to the maximum depth at which it can operate (600m). It can travel at speeds of up to 5 knots (9.3 km/h) and has an endurance of up to 70 hours at its standard cruising speed of 3 knots (5.6 km/h).

A US Navy derivative of this platform designated Mk 18 Mod 2 Kingfish was manufactured from 2012 to 2023. The Mk 18 Mod 2 is equipped with side-scan sonar, a downward-looking video camera, ADCP, GPS, beam attenuation meter (BAM) to measure turbidity, and a conductivity temperature depth (CTD) sensor.

A total of 175 REMUS 600s were delivered to customers in the United States, United Kingdom, Australia and Japan.

On September 27, 2026, the IRGC said it had captured a Remus 600 unmanned underwater vehicle (UUV) operating in the Strait of Hormuz. According to the Islamic Revolutionary Guard Corps (IRGC), the vehicle was on a reconnaissance mission when it was intercepted in a coordinated operation that involved intelligence and electronic warfare.

=== REMUS 300 ===
The small-sized REMUS 300 is a development of the REMUS 100, announced in April 2021. It has a length of 2.3 m (7 ft 7 in) and a diameter of 19 cm (7.5 in). The standard REMUS 300 weighs 56 kg (123 lb), but its modular design permits a 45.4 kg (100 lb) expeditionary configuration to a 67.6 kg (149 lb) long-endurance configuration. It can be configured with lithium-ion batteries for an endurance of up to 30 hours, with a maximum range of 165 km (89 nmi). It can dive to 305 m (1,001 ft) and has a speed of up to 5 knots (9.3 km/h).

It is designed for mine countermeasures, search and recovery, rapid environmental assessment, hydrographic survey, anti-submarine warfare, and intelligence, surveillance and reconnaissance. It has civil applications in the fields of marine archaeology, renewables, and offshore oil and gas.

In March 2022, the U.S. Navy selected the REMUS 300 as its next generation small UUV (SUUV). As of 2024, the system was also being adopted by the Royal Navy's Mine and Threat Exploitation Group.

=== REMUS 100 ===
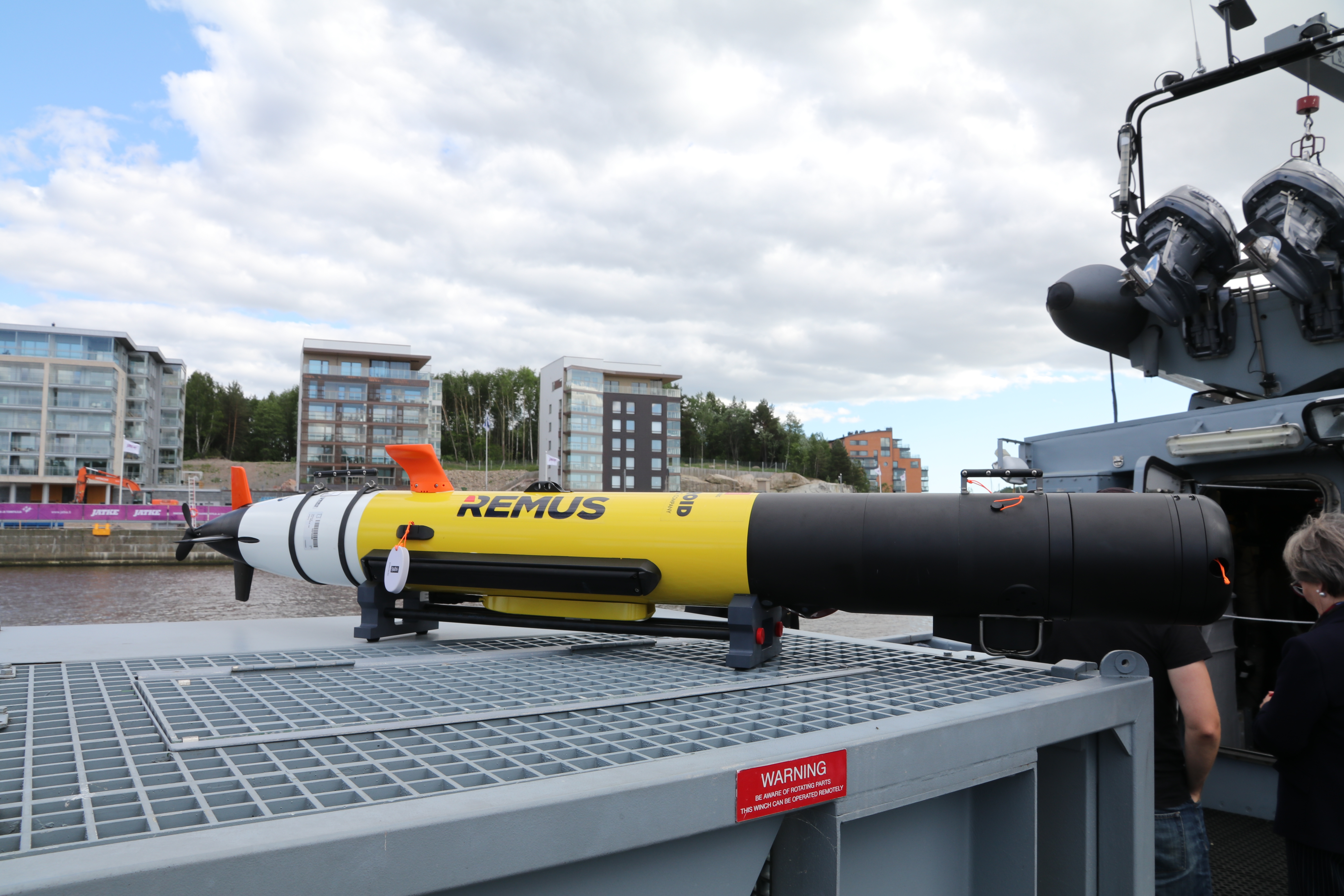
REMUS 100 of the Finnish Navy

The REMUS 100 takes its name from its max operating depth of 100 meters. The US Navy operates a derivative of the REMUS 100, in addition to the standard REMUS 100, designated Mk 18 Mod 1 “Swordfish”. It can travel at speeds of up to 5 knots (9.3 km/h) and has an endurance of up to 22 hours at its standard cruising speed of 3 knots (5.6 km/h).

=== REMUS M3V ===
The REMUS M3V (Micro 300 Meter Rated Vehicle) is the smallest in the range and is designed to fit the A-type sonobouy design envelope (91.5 x 12.4 cm). The M3V can travel at 10 knots and dive to 300 meters, apparently uniquely among the REMUS family the M3V can be airdropped.

== Operational history ==
REMUS units were used successfully in 2003 during Operation Iraqi Freedom to detect mines, and in 2011 during the fourth search for the missing aircraft "black boxes" from the crashed Air France flight AF447, which they successfully found. Three REMUS 6000 units were used in the AF447 search. In a video posted by Colombian president Juan Manuel Santos, a REMUS 6000 is seen being used by the Colombian Navy to examine the shipwreck, now patrimony, of galleon San José that sunk in 1708 off the coast of Cartagena de Indias.

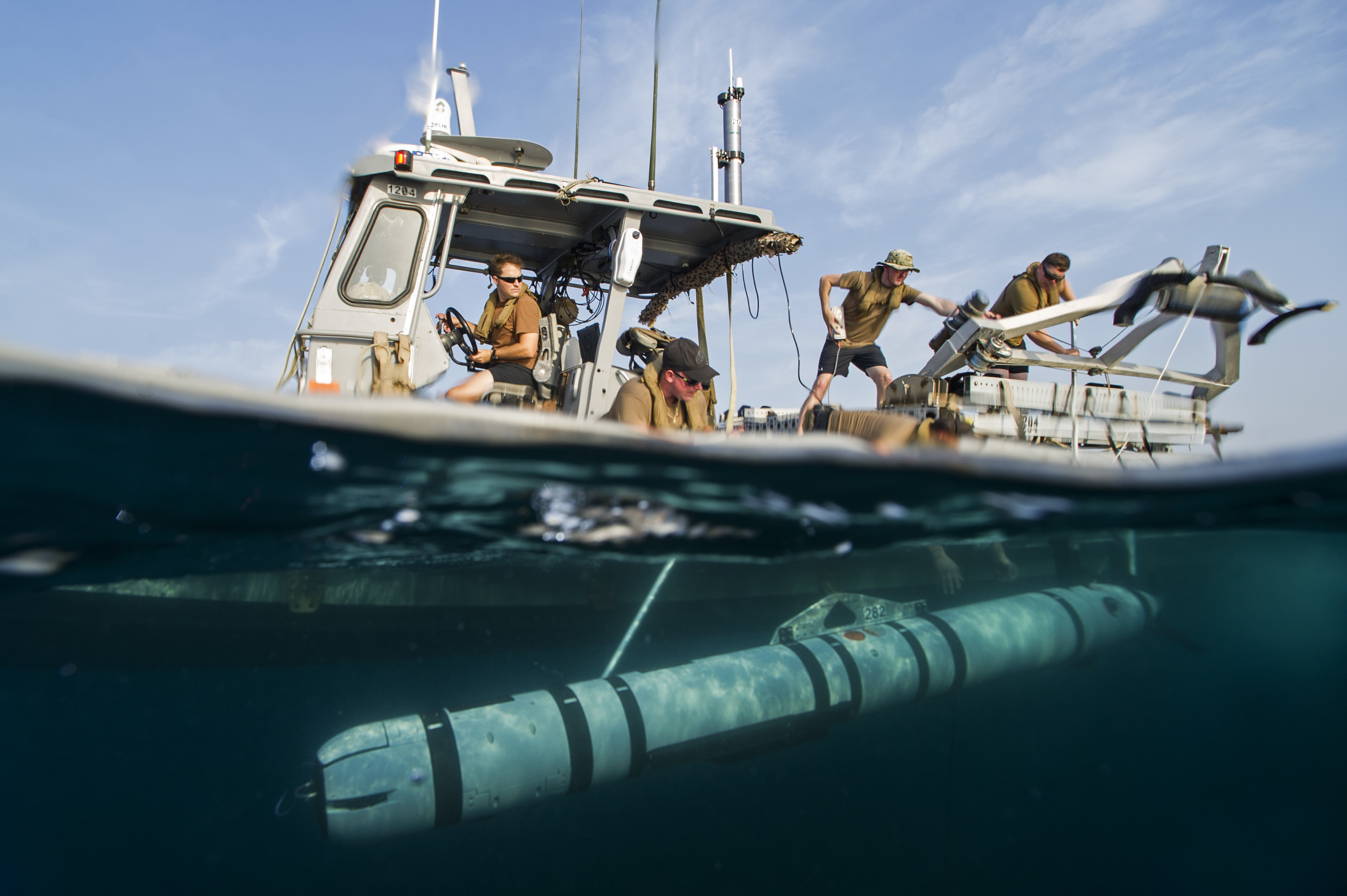
US Navy sailors launch a REMUS 600 (designated Mk 18 Mod 2 in Navy service) in the Persian Gulf

In 2012, the mine detection-variant of the REMUS 600 was deployed by the US Navy to the 5th Fleet, operating primarily in the Persian Gulf. REMUS vehicles in Navy service are generally deployed from 11-metre (36 ft) rigid hull inflatable boats, which can carry two vehicles, although they have been deployed from littoral combat ship USS Freedom and from an MH-60S Seahawk helicopter in exercises. In 2018, a US Navy REMUS 600 named “Smokey” was captured by Houthi combat divers off the coast of Yemen; the Houthi forces published a video of the captured vehicle.

The University of Hawaii at Manoa operates a REMUS 100 equipped to measure salinity, temperature, currents, bathymetry and water quality parameters. These measurements help support research conducted by the university's nearshore/offshore sensor network and water sampling programs.

In 2017 a REMUS 6000 operated from the billionaire Paul Allen’s research vessel R/V Petrel helped discover the USS Indianapolis (CA-35) at 5,500m in the Philippine Sea. In 2018 a REMUS 6000 operated from R/V Petrel discovered the wreck of the USS Lexington (CV-2) in the Western Pacific, the USS Lexington was sunk in 1942 during the Battle of the Coral Sea.

In 2019 researchers at the University of Exeter used a Woods Hole Oceanographic Institution owned REMUS 100 based SharkCam off the coast of Coll and Tiree to study basking sharks.

On February 20th, 2024 a video surfaced on X showing fighters of the Ansar Allah movement in Yemen with a captured REMUS 600 reportedly belonging to the United States Navy.

REMUS units was used by the US in the 2026 Strait of Hormuz campaign. On September 27th, Iran claimed to have captured a REMUS 600 in the Strait.

== Operators ==
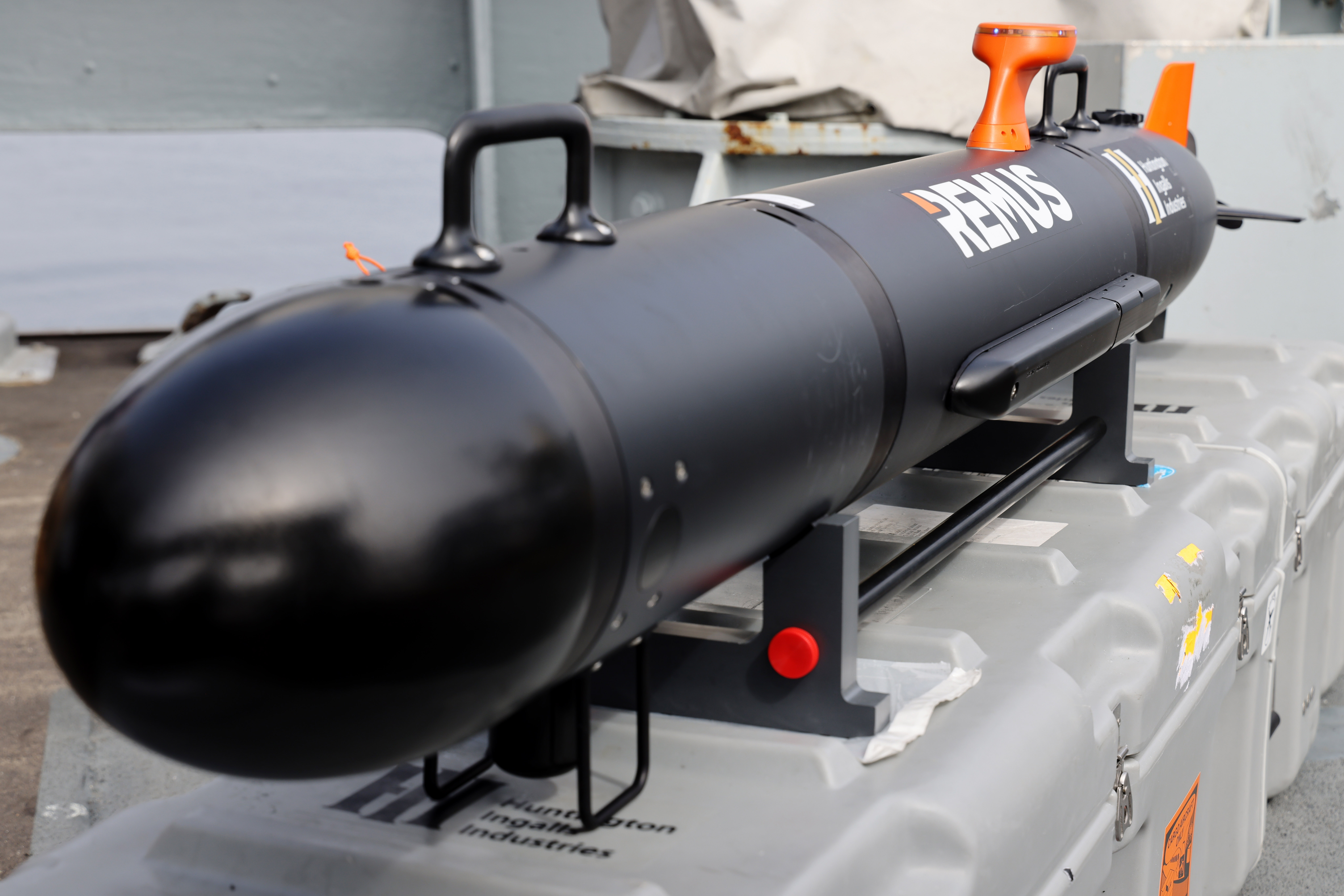
REMUS used for mine countermeasure operations by the Royal Navy

Algeria

- Forces navales algériennes

United States

- United States Navy
- Woods Hole Oceanographic Institute
- Naval Oceanographic Office
- University of Hawaii at Manoa

United Kingdom

- Royal Navy

Croatia

- Croatian Navy

Finland

- Finnish Navy

Netherlands

- Royal Netherlands Navy

Canada

- Royal Canadian Navy

Japan

- Japan Agency for Marine-Earth Science and Technology
- Japan Maritime Self-Defense Force
  - Remus 100 used as OZZ-1/3.
  - Remus 600 used as OZZ-2/4 at Awaji-class minesweeper

Ireland

- Irish naval service

New Zealand

- Royal New Zealand Navy

Romania

- Romanian Naval Forces

Ukraine

- Ukrainian Navy Unmanned surface vehicles announced as military aid to be sent to Ukraine by the United Kingdom (from industry) in August 2022

== See also ==
Exercise REP(MUS)
