= Gil Eannes (ship) =

Portuguese ship built in 1955

Coordinates: 41.6901°N 8.8304°W

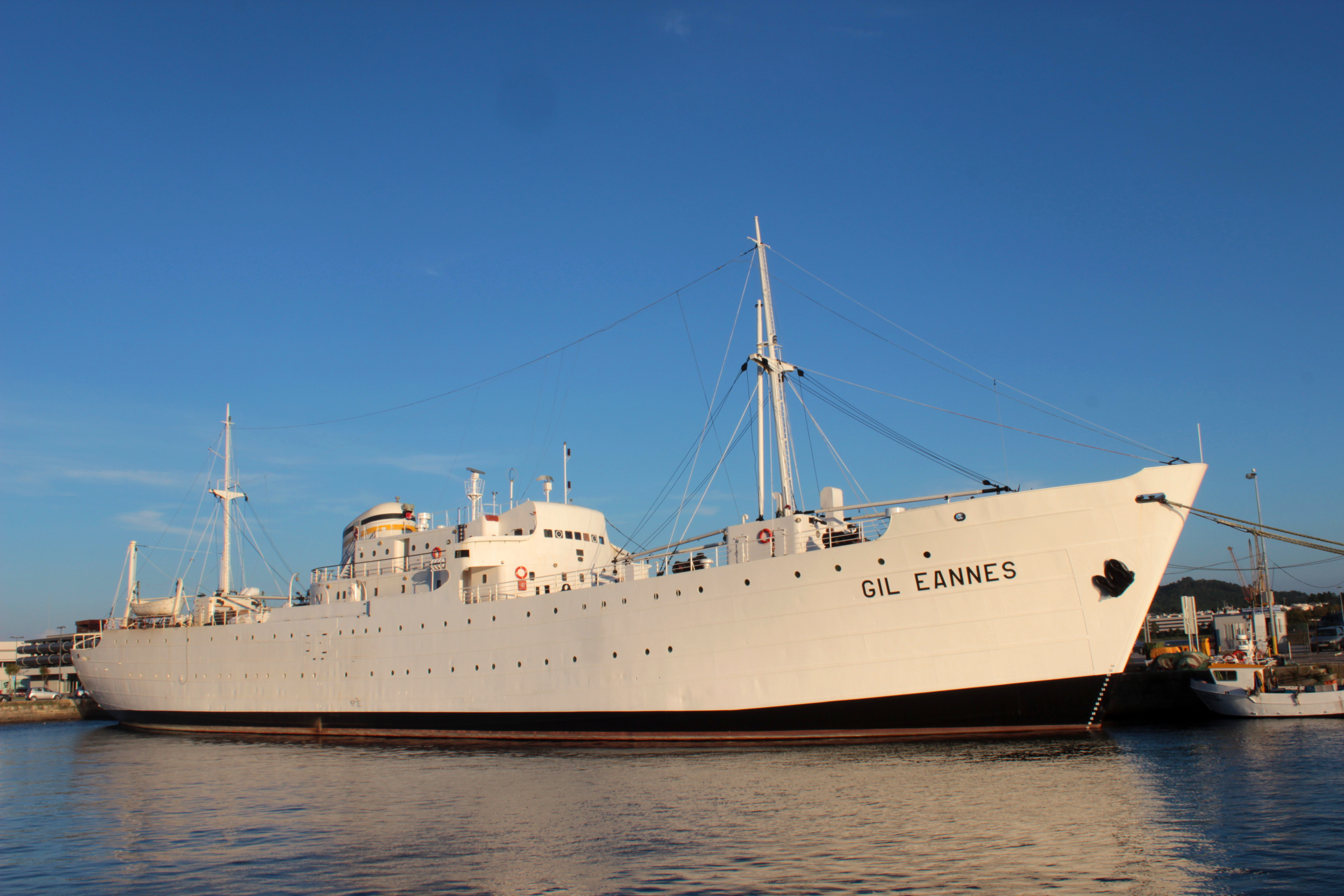
- Gil Eannes, moored in Viana do Castelo

History

Portugal
- Name: Gil Eannes
- Namesake: Gil Eanes
- Builder: Viana do Castelo Naval Shipyards
- Launched: 20 March 1955
- In service: 1955
- Out of service: 1973
- Identification: IMO number: 5130587
- Status: Preserved as a museum ship and hostel in Viana do Castelo, Portugal

General characteristics
- Tonnage: 3,467 GT
- Length: 322.99 ft (98.45 m)
- Beam: 45.00 ft (13.72 m)
- Draught: 7.87 ft (2.40 m)
- Propulsion: 2 engines of 1,400 bhp (1,000 kW) each
- Speed: 12.5 knots (23.2 km/h; 14.4 mph)

Gil Eannes is a former Portuguese hospital ship, now permanently moored in the Port of Viana do Castelo, serving as museum ship and youth hostel.

The official name of the ship is written according to the old spelling of the Portuguese language, but occasionally it appears written with the modern spelling Gil Eanes.

Between 1955 and 1973, Gil Eannes was the flagship of the Portuguese White Fleet that operated in the codfish fishing in the seas of the Grand Banks of Newfoundland and Greenland. As the flagship of the White Fleet and besides her main function as hospital ship, Gil Eannes served also as maritime authority, mail ship, tug, icebreaker and general support ship for the Portuguese fishing vessels.

== History ==
Gil Eannes was designed to replace a ship with the same name, as hospital and support ship for the Portuguese White Fleet. The first Gil Eannes was the former German merchant ship Lahneck, captured by the Portuguese authorities in 1916. Lahneck was then renamed Gil Eannes, being transformed and employed as auxiliary cruiser by the Portuguese Navy, during World War I. In 1927, she was adapted to hospital ship and sent, for the first time, to the seas of Newfoundland in support to the Portuguese fishing fleet. In 1937, she started to support the White Fleet on a regular basis, in 1942 being transferred from the Portuguese Navy to the Portuguese guild of codfish fishing ship owners (Grémio dos Armadores de Navios da Pesca do Bacalhau).

The Grémio dos Armadores de Navios da Pesca do Bacalhau ordered a new ship to replace the first Gil Eannes. The new Gil Eannes was built by the Viana do Castelo Naval Shipyards, in 1955. She was designed as a state of the art hospital ship, also being able to provide a wide range of services in support to the Portuguese fishing vessels. So besides hospital, the ship served as tug, icebreaker, mail ship and supply ship. The ship also served as the Portuguese maritime authority for the White Fleet, when it was operating in the high seas, for this role carrying on board a naval officer who acted as harbour-master.

In 1963, Gil Eannes started to operate as passenger and reefer ship during the periods between the codfish fishing seasons. In 1973, the ship made the last trip to the seas of Newfoundland. In the same year, Gil Eannes was sent to Brazil in a diplomatic trip under the sponsorship of then Portuguese ambassador José Hermano Saraiva.

After the last trip in 1973, the ship lost its functions, staying moored and abandoned in the Port of Lisbon for many years. The ship was intended to be demolished for scrap.

In 1997, the historian and TV presenter José Hermano Saraiva (sponsor of the last trip of the ship when he was ambassador to Brazil) launched, in one of his history TV programs, a campaign to save the historical ship Gil Eannes from the intended demolition that was planned to occur in the next few days.

Gil Eannes was able to be saved in the last minute and, in 1998, she was restored in the Viana do Castelo shipyards, with the support of several institutions, private companies and citizens. Part of the ship (part of the former wards) was transformed into a 60-bed youth hostel, the rest of the ship being restored according to the original features to be a museum ship.

Gil Eannes is now permanently moored in the Viana do Castelo fishing harbour and managed by the Gil Eannes Foundation.

== Gallery ==
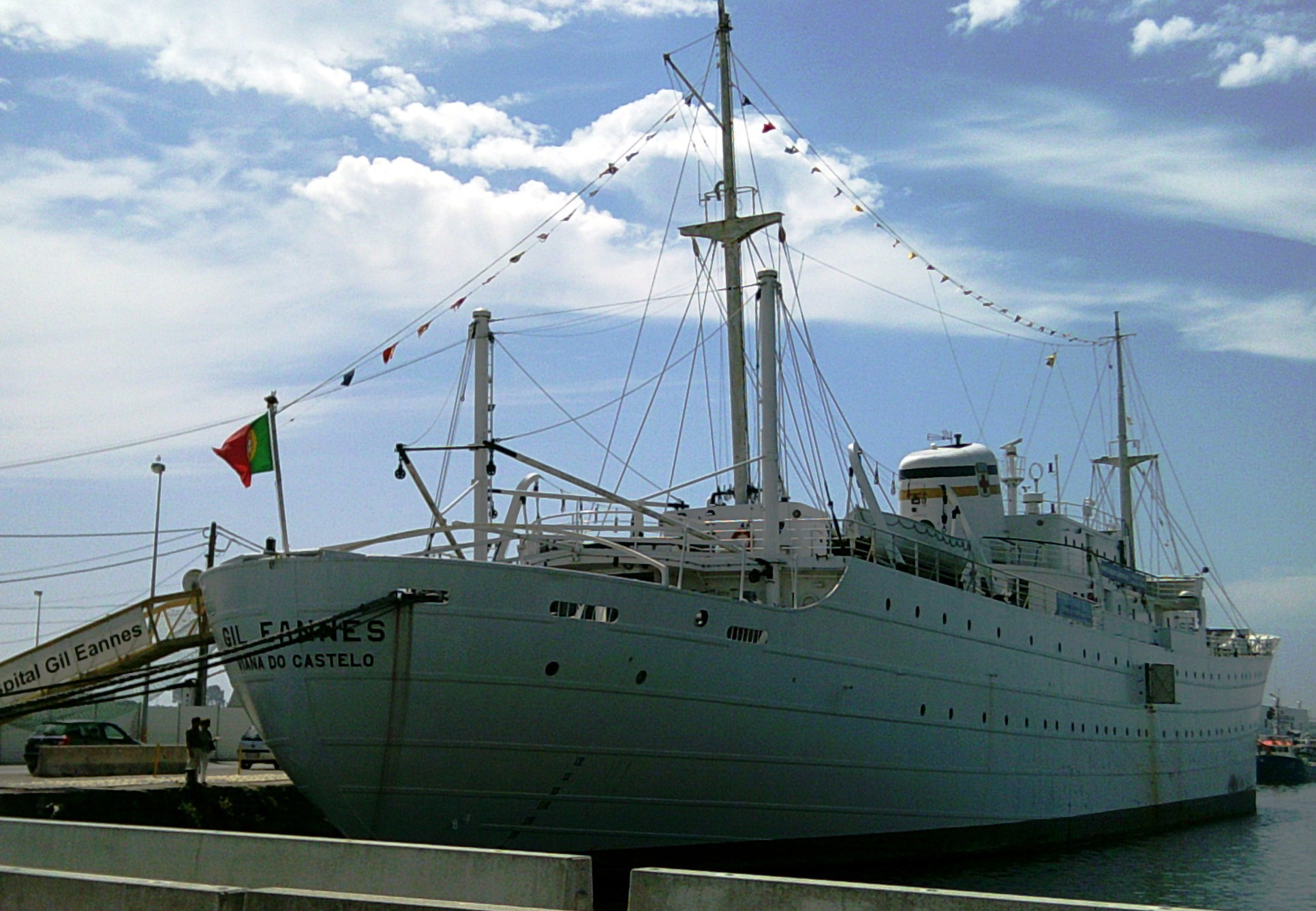
Starboard side

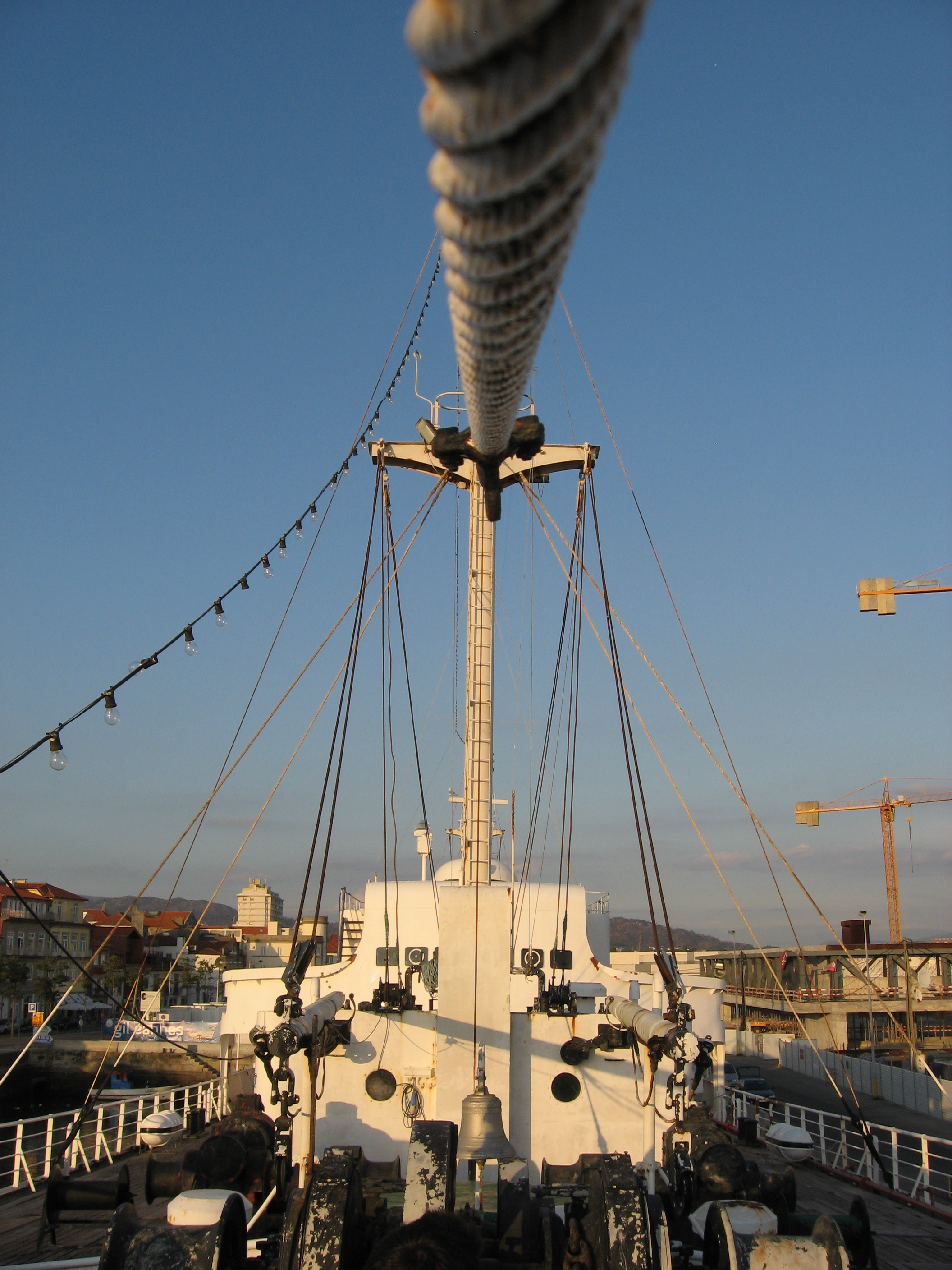
Main deck and masts

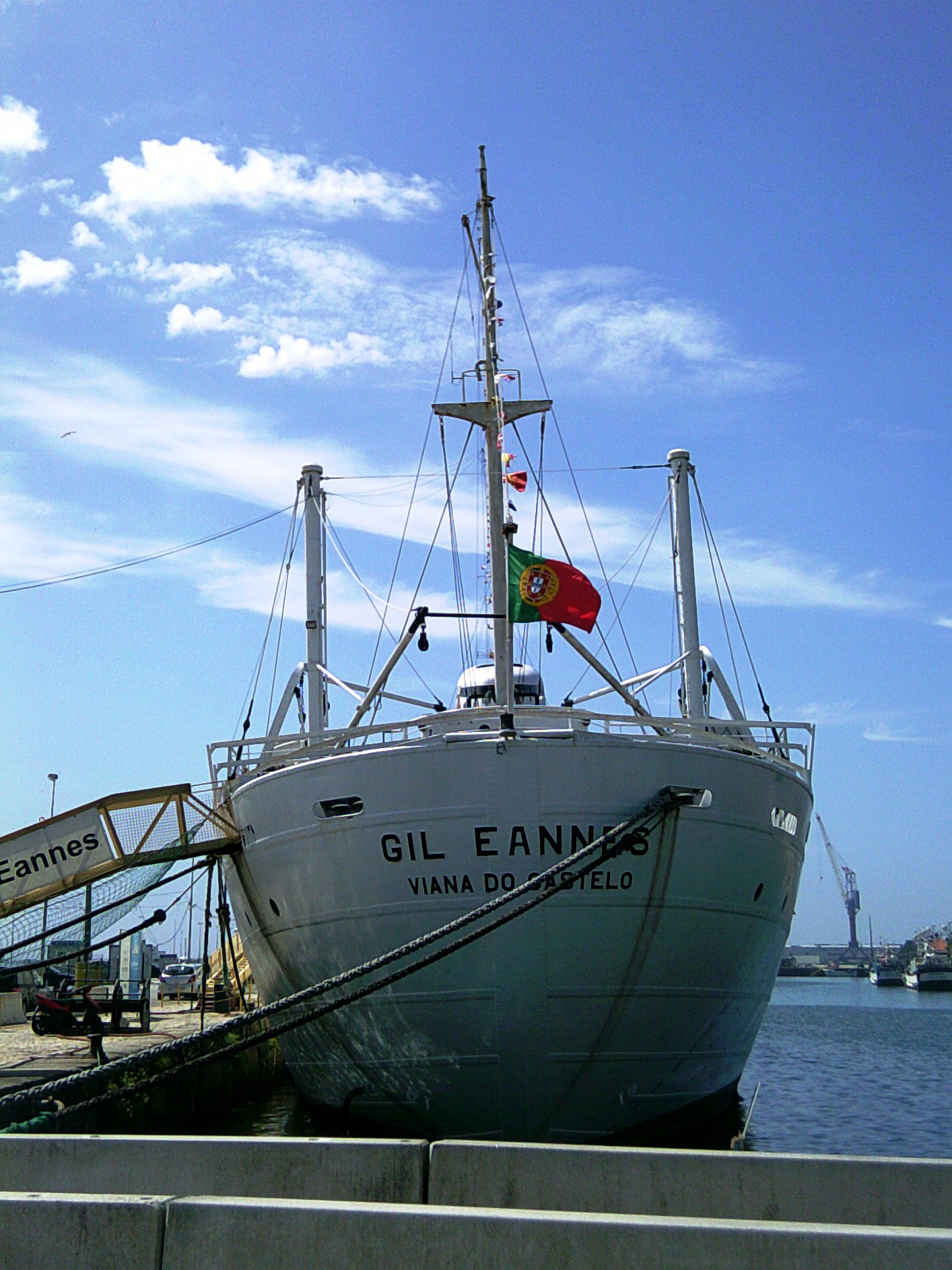
Stern

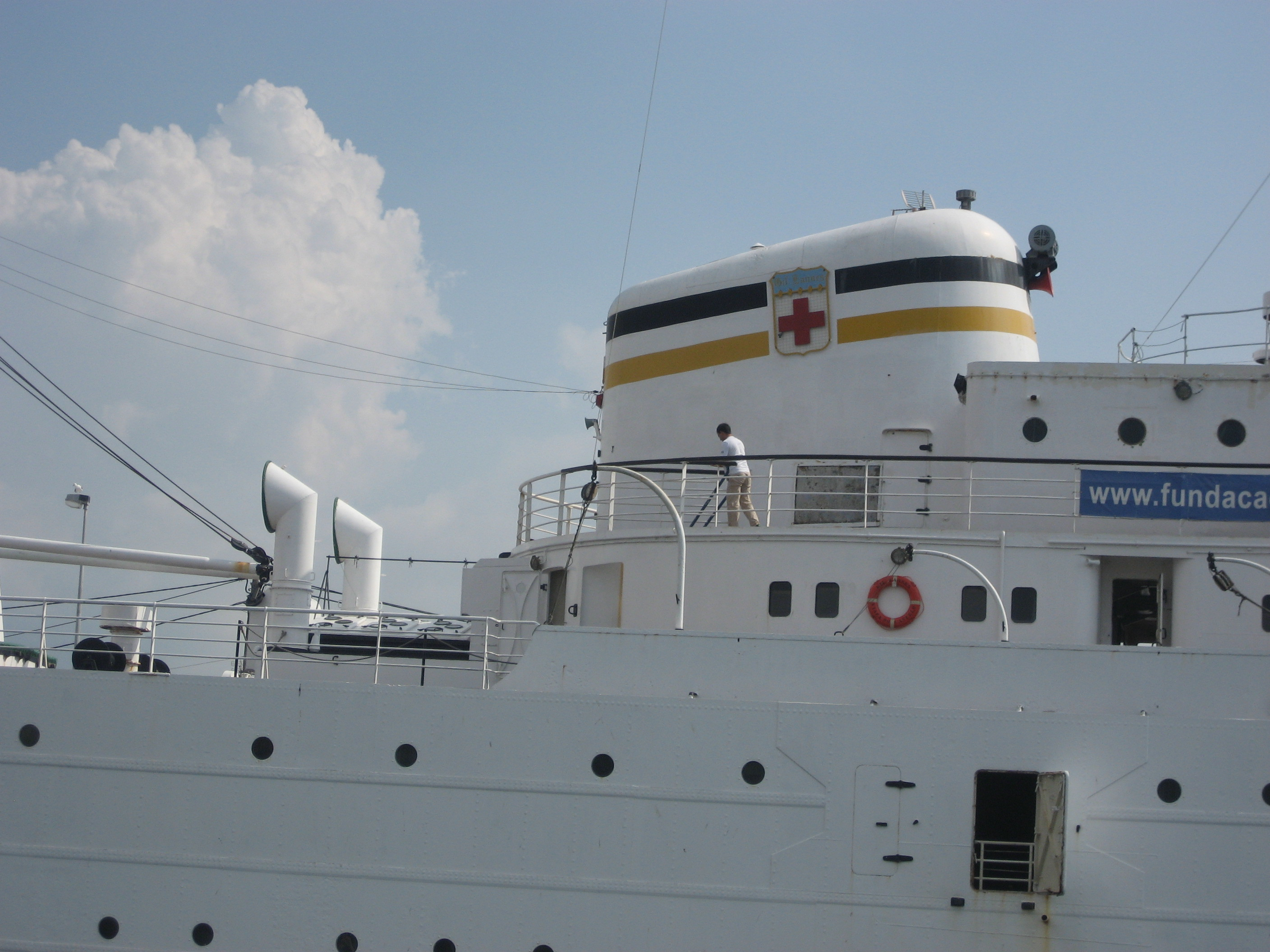
Funnel

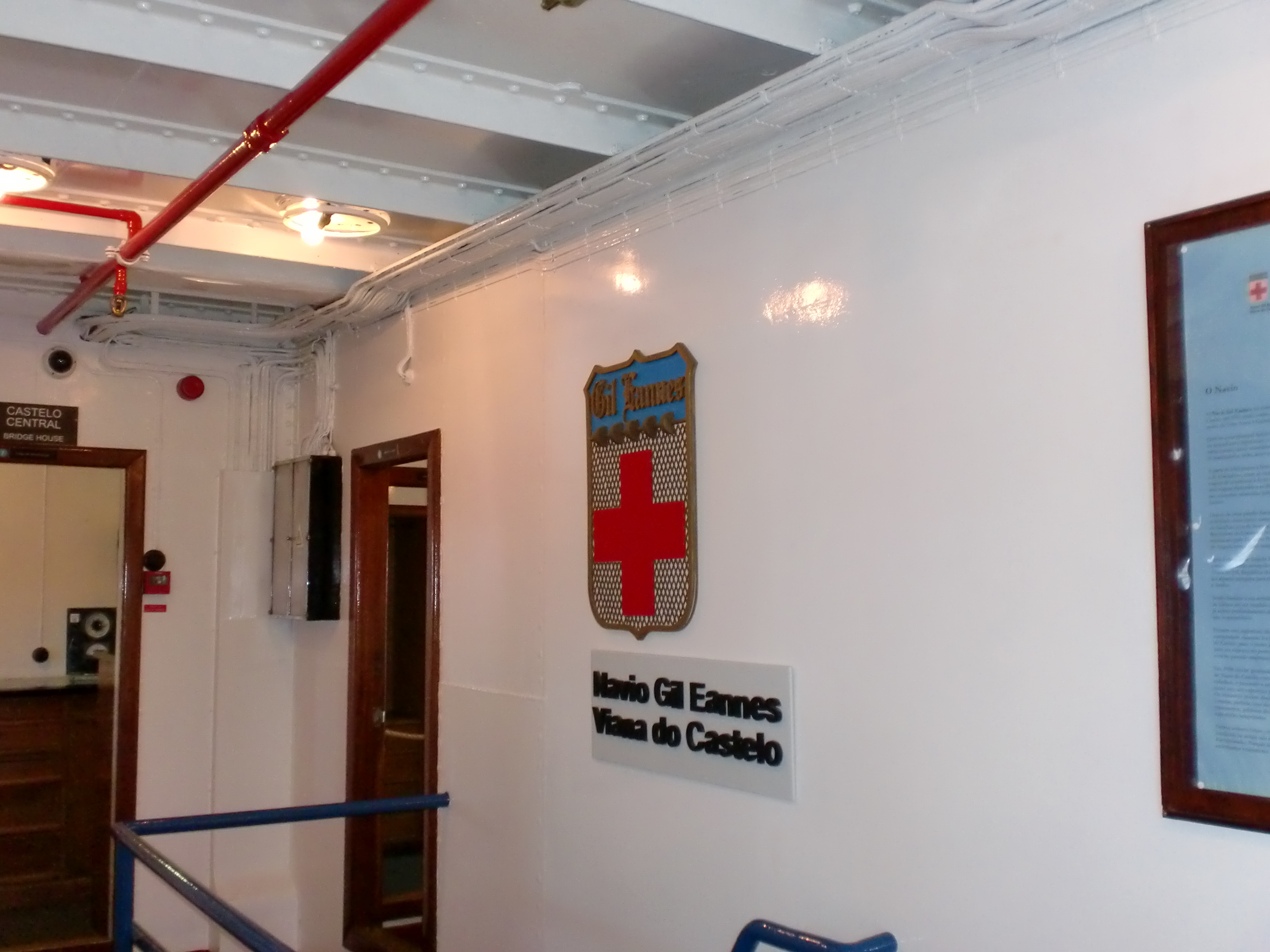
Interior and ship's badge

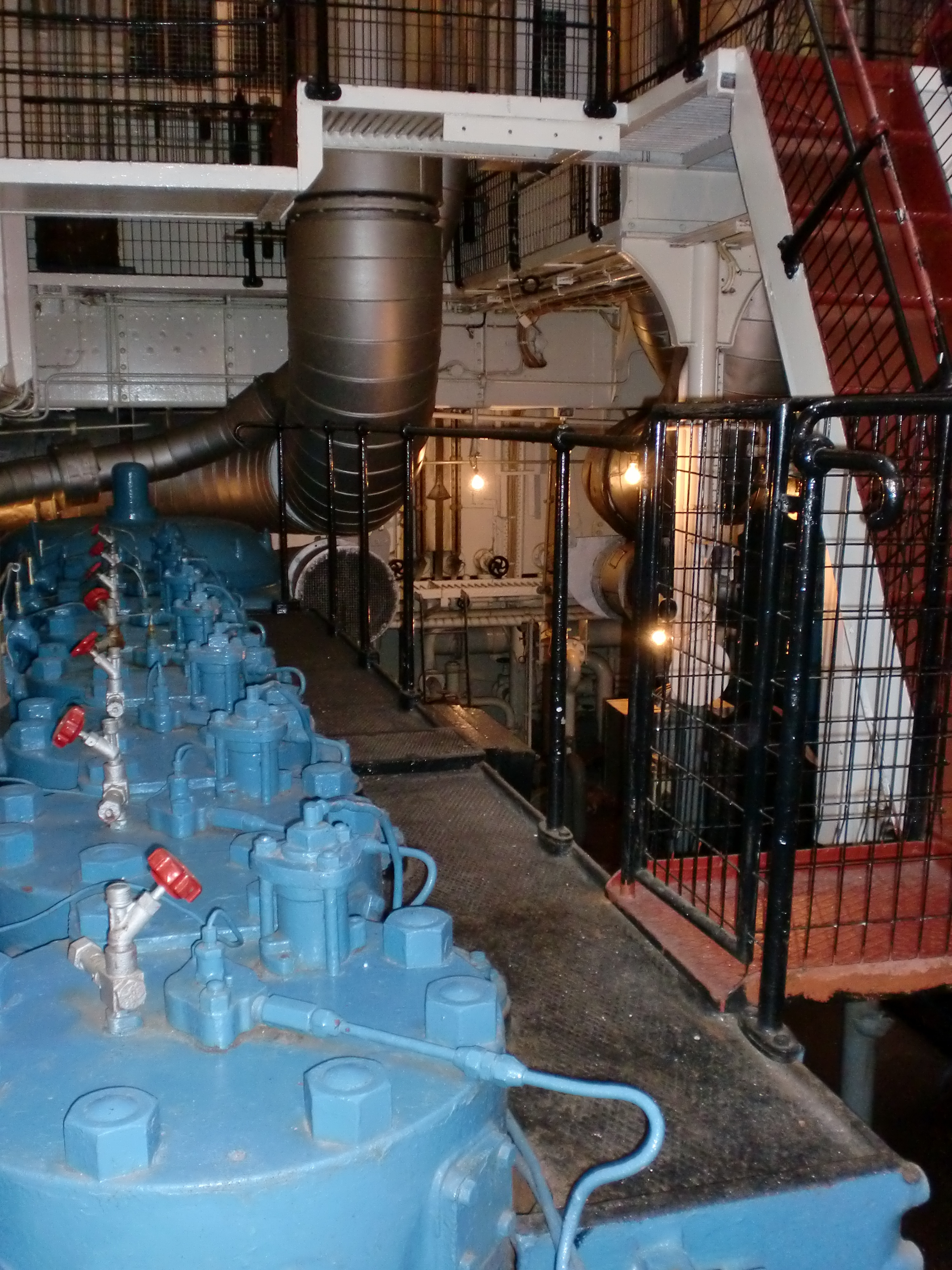
Engine room
