= NRP Dom Carlos I =

1989 Stalwart-class research vessel

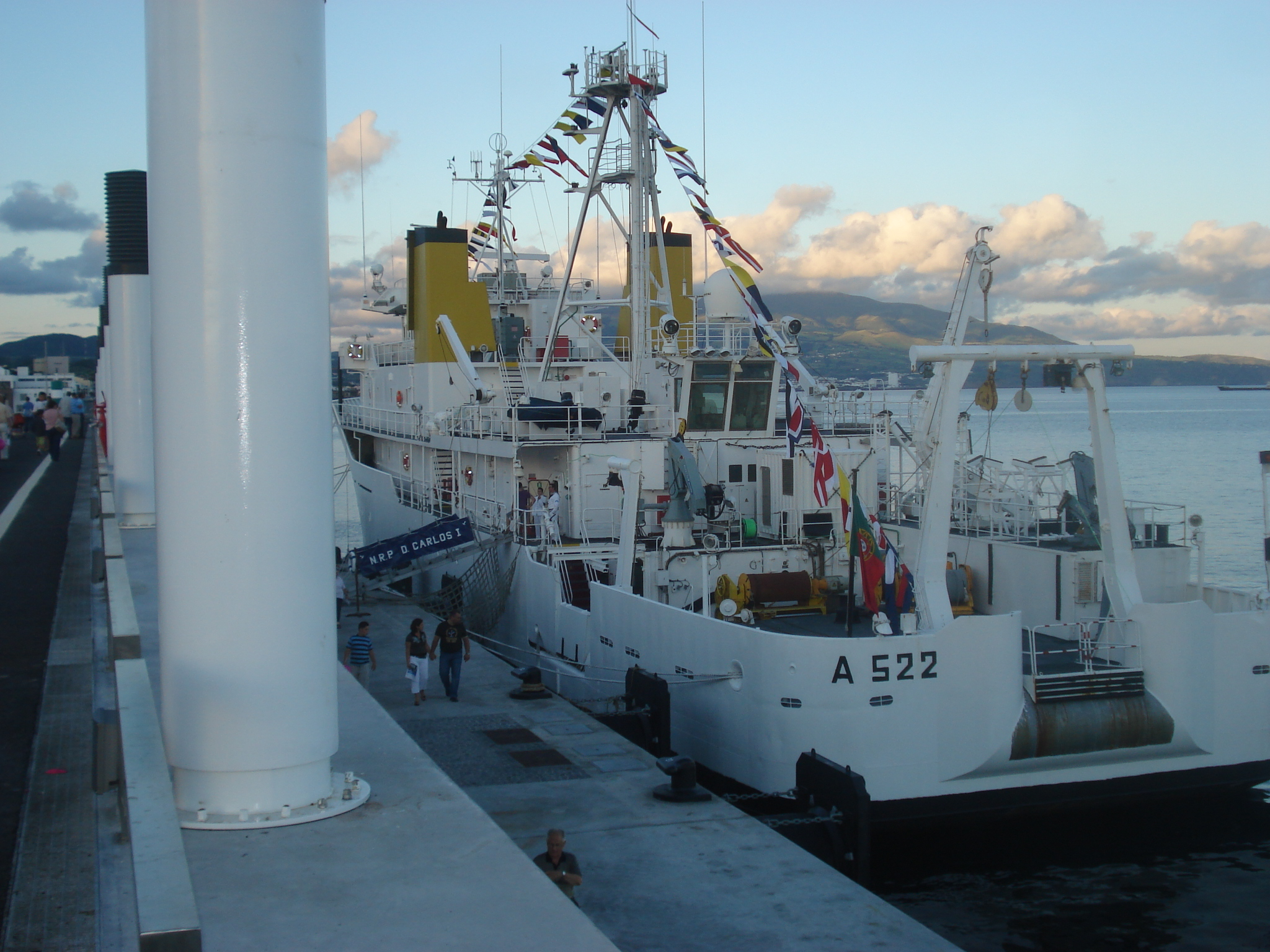
- NRP Dom Carlos I at dock at the Portas do Mar in 2008

History

United States
- Name: USNS Audacious
- Awarded: 30 September 1987
- Builder: Tacoma Boatbuilding Company
- Laid down: 29 February 1988
- Launched: 28 January 1989
- In service: 12 June 1989
- Out of service: 9 December 1996
- Stricken: 6 February 1997
- Identification: IMO number: 8830920; Callsign: NJMR; Hull number: T-AGOS-11
- Fate: Transferred to Portugal

Portugal
- Name: NRP Dom Carlos I
- Namesake: King Charles I of Portugal
- Acquired: February 1997
- Commissioned: 1997
- In service: 1997
- Identification: MMSI number: 263144000; Callsign: CTHJ; A522
- Status: In service as a survey ship

General characteristics
- Class & type: Stalwart-class ocean surveillance ship
- Displacement: 1565 tons (light) 2535 tons (full)
- Length: 224 ft (68 m)
- Complement: 30

NRP Dom Carlos I (A522) is the lead ship of the Portuguese Navy's Dom Carlos I-class survey vessels (ex-US Stalwart-class ocean surveillance ships) adapted in Portugal for the execution of hydrography and oceanography surveys. Before the transference to the Portuguese Navy, Dom Carlos I was USNS Audacious (T-AGOS-11) surveillance ship of the United States Navy.

== History ==
USNS Audacious was a Stalwart-class modified tactical auxiliary general ocean surveillance ship of the United States Navy.

Stalwart-class ships were originally designed to collect underwater acoustical data in support of Cold War anti-submarine warfare operations in the 1980s.

ex-USNS Audacious was transferred to the Portuguese Navy in 1996 and renamed Dom Carlos I in honor to Carlos I, King of Portugal and a pioneer scientist in the oceanography field. The refitting of Audacious for transfer to Portugal was completed at Detyens Shipyard on the site of the former Charleston Naval Base in North Charleston, South Carolina.

In Portugal, Almirante Gago Coutinho underwent adaptation works towards its transformation into a hydro-oceanographic ship, in the Alfeite Naval Arsenal. The first phase of the transformation was carried out in 2001 and the second phase in 2004. The Portuguese Navy has tried to fix it for almost a year but that work is very difficult because of lack of money and resources and tight budget. In its full capacity for the assignments it was tasked for; this vessel stands over 6 months in service without refueling. The only reason it needs harbouring is to get the food needed for its 32 sailors on board.

Recently it was installed a new sonar dome. With this new improvement it is expected to sonar the 5,000 meter depth or more.
