= Martifer =

Martifer SGPS, S.A.
- Type: Public
- Traded as: Euronext Lisbon: MAR
- ISIN: PTMFR0AM0003
- Industry: Metallic Construction; Energy Systems; Electricity Generation
- Founded: 1990
- Headquarters: Oliveira de Frades, Portugal
- Key people: Carlos Martins, Chairman; Jorge Martins, CEO
- Products: Steel Structures; Aluminium; Stainless Steel wind and solar energy
- Revenue: ▲€ ~650 million (core activity - 2008)
- Number of employees: ~3000 (2008)
- Website: www.martifer.com

Martifer SGPS, S.A. is a family group based in Oliveira de Frades, Portugal, with over 3,000 employees, focusing its activity on the metal construction and renewable energy areas.

The company launched its first operations in 1990 in the metal structure industry. In 2004, it entered the renewables business, leveraging know-how from the metal construction operation to develop the energy equipment division.

Martifer is a market leader in Iberia for metal construction, and aims to become the top player in other specific markets, namely Europe and Angola.

In renewable energies, Martifer would like to become established as an integrated producer of turn-key solutions for the wind and solar segments. Furthermore, within renewable energies, Martifer operates as a promoter of electricity generation projects, with a portfolio of holdings in projects at different phases of development.

Martifer SGPS, SA is the Group's holding company and has been listed on the Euronext Lisbon since June 2007. In 2008, its core activity operating revenues reached EUR 650 million. The main shareholder structure is made up of the founding partners, through I’M SGPS, S.A., and the Mota-Engil Group, both control approximately 80% of the company.

In June 2009, Martifer and Hirschfeld Wind Energy Solutions, a part of Hirschfeld Industries in Texas, United States, announced a Joint venture for the manufacture of wind towers and related components in the United States. The project was estimated to cost $40 million US dollars to build a new facility in San Angelo, Texas. Production was originally expected to reach a capacity of 400 towers a year by 2013. However, the operation was unable to compete effectively in the very difficult pricing environment for wind towers in the 2009–2011 time frame and the investment failed to reach its objectives. On July 18, 2012, Hirschfeld announced that it had acquired the remaining 50 percent of the joint venture from Martifer for a small cash payment, and as of 2014, had converted the plant to build steel bridge structures. The last wind tower was produced there in 2012.

== History ==
The company was founded by two brothers, Carlos Martins and Jorge Martins in Oliveira de Frades, Central Portugal,. The enterprise has started with 18 employees. Today the group has worldwide 3,000 employees. Subsidiaries are in Spain (1999), Poland (2003), Romania (2005), Czech Republic (2005), Slovakia (2005), Germany (2005), Brazil (2006) and Angola (2006).
