= Viana do Castelo-class patrol vessel =

Class of Portuguese Navy patrol vessels

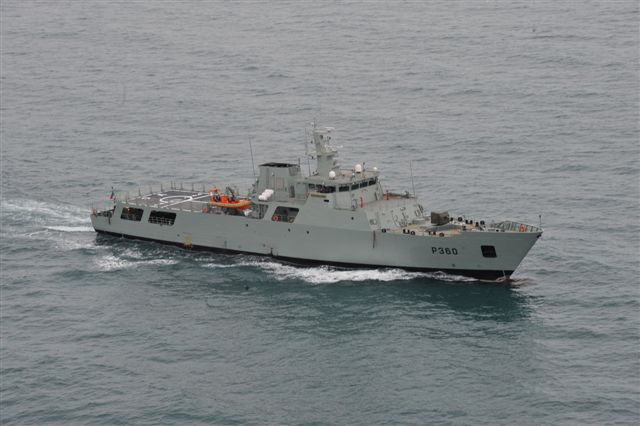
- NRP Viana do Castelo

Class overview
- Builders: Estaleiros Navais de Viana do Castelo (ENVC) and West Sea Shipyard
- Operators: Portuguese Navy
- Preceded by: João Coutinho-class corvette
- Subclasses: NPO - ocean patrol vessel NCP - anti-pollution vessel
- In commission: 2010–present
- Planned: 10
- Completed: 4
- Active: 4

General characteristics
- Type: Offshore patrol vessel
- Displacement: 1,850 tons
- Length: 83.10 m (272 ft 8 in)
- Beam: 12.95 m (42 ft 6 in)
- Draught: 3.82 m (12 ft 6 in)
- Propulsion: 2 x Wärtsilä diesel engines (3,900 kW (5,200 hp) each), 2 electric engines (200 kW (270 hp) each)
- Speed: 21 knots (39 km/h; 24 mph) maximum
- Boats & landing craft carried: 2 x Rigid Inflatable Boats
- Complement: 35 accommodation for 32 more
- Sensors & processing systems: Leonardo Medusa MK4/B electro-optical fire control system, Electro-optical SAGEM / VIGY, 2x KH Manta2000 navigation radar, iXblue Quadrans inertial navigation system, Furuno Electric's FAR-3230 F-band, FAR-3220 I-band navigation radars
- Armament: 1 × 30 mm Oto Melara Marlin WS; 2 × M2 Browning machine gun; 2 x MG 3 machine gun
- Aviation facilities: Medium-sized helicopter pad but no hangar supporting Super Lynx Mk.95
- Notes: Anti-pollution version (NCP); System for recovery and transfer of pollutants spilled on the ocean.; Barrier launcher.; 2 × Floating tank of "Unibag" type, of 50 m3 each.; 1 × Internal coil of vapor circulation, to allow the heating of the existing pollutant products inside of the tanks, to facilitate their extraction.

The Viana do Castelo class is a class of offshore patrol vessels planned by and for the Portuguese Navy, as a result of the NPO2000 Project (Portuguese, Navios de Patrulha Oceânica, for Oceanic Patrol Vessels), that are being constructed in the West Sea Shipyard.

== Design ==
The eight to ten vessels of this class, specially designed to operate in the waters of the North Atlantic Ocean, will replace the João Coutinho and Baptista de Andrade-class corvettes — currently being decommissioned —, and the small patrol boats of the Cacine class in their primary fisheries protection role (SIFICAP) and in their search and rescue (SAR) roles. Two of these vessels of the version Navios de Combate à Poluição (NCP) will be fitted with anti-pollution systems — including Fast Oil Recovery systems. These vessels are named after Portuguese coastal cities.

The first vessel, NRP Viana do Castelo, was commissioned in March 2010 after several years of delay. Six additional vessels are planned by the Portuguese Navy as announced in 2016 to be built in 2017 and 2018. On 22 June 2018 the Portuguese prime minister announced an additional order of six Viana do Castelo-class ships to be built at same shipyard over the next six years along with a multi purpose ship for a total of 500 million euros. The order for six more vessels was finalized on 25 May 2021.

Viana do Castelo was temporarily commissioned with an old 40 mm gun, but the Portuguese Navy is acquiring two 30 mm Oto Melara Marlin guns for the first two vessels.

== Armament ==
Armament consists of a 30 mm Oto Melara Marlin, it replaces one 40 mm L/60 turreted gun in NRP Viana do Castelo, and four mounts to be armed with two 7.62 mm light machine guns and two 12.7 mm M2 Browning as well as two launching systems for MK55 Mod 2 mines. The ships are designed to operate automated systems and are equipped with a single Sagem SA Vigy 10 MKIII naval surveillance and observation platform, three water cannons, and two rigid inflatable boats. Each ship is capable of accommodating a Super Lynx MK95 light helicopter.

The third series of the Viana do Castelo class will be armed with one 30 mm Oto Melara Marlin, one Mark 32 torpedo tube, one launching system for MK55 Mod 2 mines, countermeasure launcher, two Protector RWS and various 12.7 mm M2 Brownings.

== Modernization ==
The Portuguese Navy is gradually upgrading its Viana do Castelo-class ships during their maintenance cycles. This modernization is designed to eliminate logistical, functional and operational obsolescence; add capabilities needed for future operations; and enable the integration of modular systems for mission support, self-protection, surveillance and anti-submarine warfare (ASW). The Viana do Castelo class is also being progressively upgraded to enable vertical take-off and landing (VTOL) unmanned aerial vehicle (UAV) operations to provide intelligence, surveillance and reconnaissance (ISR) capabilities

== Ships ==
| Pennant | Name | Version | Laid down | Shipyard | Launched | Commissioned | Status |
Series 1
| P360 | Viana do Castelo | NPO | 2004 | ENVC | 1 October 2005 | March 2011 | In service |
| P361 | Figueira da Foz | NPO | 2004 | ENVC | 1 October 2005 | June 2013 | In service; tasked to the Azores and Madeira |
Series 2
| P362 | Sines | NPO | 2015 | West Sea | 3 May 2017 | July 2018 | In service |
| P363 | Setúbal | NPO | 2015 | West Sea | 13 September 2017 | February 2019 | In service |
Series 3
| P364 | Porto | NPO | ? | West Sea | Under construction | 2027 | Approved |
| P365 | Lisboa | NPO | ? | West Sea | Ordered | 2028 | Approved |
| P366 | Ponta Delgada | NPO | ? | West Sea | Ordered | 2029 | Approved |
| P367 | Funchal | NPO | ? | West Sea | Ordered | 2029 | Approved |
| P368 | Portimão | NPO | ? | West Sea | Ordered | 2030 | Approved |
| P369 | Aveiro | NPO | ? | West Sea | Ordered | 2030 | Approved |

== See also ==
- West Sea Shipyard
