= List of active Portuguese Navy ships =

Naval vessel list

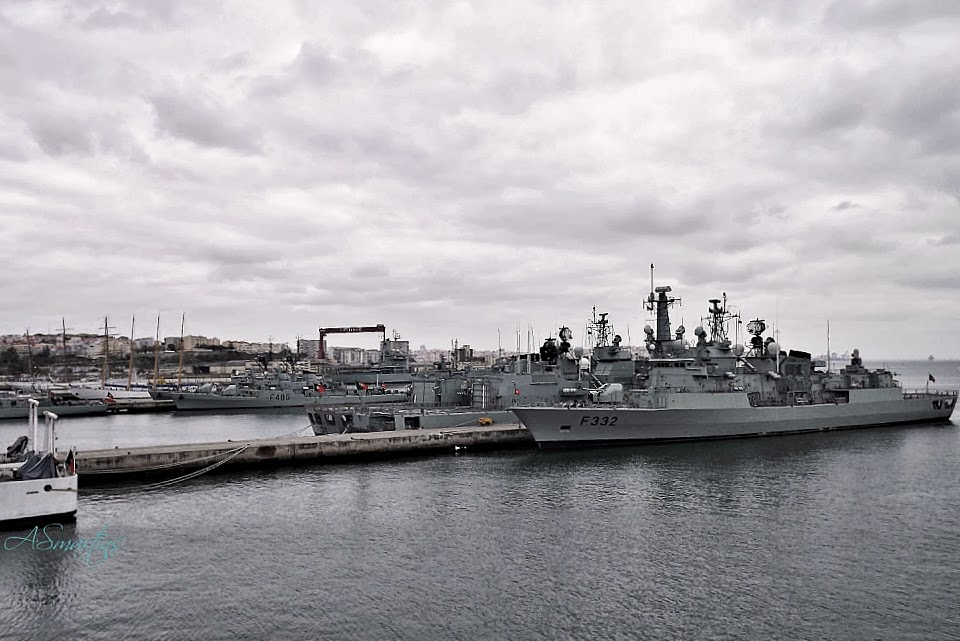
Lisbon Naval Base

This is a list of active Portuguese Navy ships.

In total there are 65 vessels operated by the Navy, of which, 30 are military ships, known as Navio da República Portuguesa (NRP) and 35 are auxiliary military vessels, known as Unidade Auxiliar da Marinha (UAM).

== Current fleet ==
=== Submarine fleet ===
Class	In service	Picture	Origin	Type	Builder	Propulsion	Boat	No.	Comm.	Displacement	Notes
Tridente class Type 214, or U209PN	2		Germany	Attack submarine	HDW	Diesel electric , and fuel cells AIP	NRP Tridente	S160	2010	2,020 t	
Tridente class Type 214, or U209PN	2		Germany	Attack submarine	HDW	Diesel electric , and fuel cells AIP	NRP Arpão	S161	2010	2,020 t	

=== Surface combat fleet ===
Class	In service	Picture	Origin	Type	Builder	Boat	No.	Comm.	Displace.	Notes
Frigates (5)
Vasco da Gama class MEKO 200 PN	3		Germany	Multi-purpose frigate	Blohm + Voss, HDW	NRP Vasco da Gama	F330	1991	3,200 t	
Vasco da Gama class MEKO 200 PN	3		Germany	Multi-purpose frigate	Blohm + Voss, HDW	NRP Álvares Cabral	F331	1991	3,200 t	
Vasco da Gama class MEKO 200 PN	3		Germany	Multi-purpose frigate	Blohm + Voss, HDW	NRP Corte-Real	F332	1992	3,200 t	
Bartolomeu Dias class M-class	2		Netherlands	Multi-purpose frigate	Damen Schelde Naval	NRP Bartolomeu Dias	F333	(2009 (1994)	3,500 t	The ships are Second-hand ships of the Karel Doorman class.
Bartolomeu Dias class M-class	2		Netherlands	Multi-purpose frigate	Damen Schelde Naval	NRP Dom Francisco de Almeida	F334	2010 (1994)	3,500 t	The ships are Second-hand ships of the Karel Doorman class.
Offshore patrol vessels (4)
Viana do Castelo class	4 (+6 on order)		Portugal	Offshore patrol vessel	ENVC Shipyard	NRP Viana do Castelo	P360	2011	1,850 t	3 batches ordered (2 / 2 / 6 ships).
Viana do Castelo class	4 (+6 on order)		Portugal	Offshore patrol vessel	ENVC Shipyard	NRP Figueira da Foz	P361	2013	1,850 t	3 batches ordered (2 / 2 / 6 ships).
Viana do Castelo class	4 (+6 on order)		Portugal	Offshore patrol vessel	West Sea Shipyard	NRP Sines	P362	2018	1,850 t	3 batches ordered (2 / 2 / 6 ships).
Viana do Castelo class	4 (+6 on order)		Portugal	Offshore patrol vessel	West Sea Shipyard	NRP Setúbal	P363	2019	1,850 t	3 batches ordered (2 / 2 / 6 ships).
Patrol vessels (20)
Tejo-class	4		Denmark	Patrol boat	Danyard A/S	NRP Tejo	P590	2016	320 t	Sold to the Dominican Republic in 2026, with delivery scheduled for between 2027 and 2028.
Tejo-class	4		Denmark	Patrol boat	Danyard A/S	NRP Douro	P591	2016	320 t	Sold to the Dominican Republic in 2026, with delivery scheduled for between 2027 and 2028.
Tejo-class	4		Denmark	Patrol boat	Danyard A/S	NRP Mondego	P592	2016	320 t	Sold to the Dominican Republic in 2026, with delivery scheduled for between 2027 and 2028.
Tejo-class	4		Denmark	Patrol boat	Danyard A/S	NRP Guadiana	P593	2016	320 t	Sold to the Dominican Republic in 2026, with delivery scheduled for between 2027 and 2028.
Cacine class	1		Portugal	Patrol boat	Estaleiros Navais do Mondego	NRP Zaire	P1146	1971	292 t	
Argos class	5		Portugal	Patrol boat	Estaleiros Navais de Vila Real de Santo António	NRP Argos	P1150	1991	94 t	
Argos class	5		Portugal	Patrol boat	Estaleiros Navais de Vila Real de Santo António	NRP Dragão	P1151	1991	94 t	
Argos class	5		Portugal	Patrol boat	Estaleiros Navais de Vila Real de Santo António	NRP Escorpião	P1152	1991	94 t	
Argos class	5		Portugal	Patrol boat	Estaleiros Navais de Vila Real de Santo António	NRP Cassiopeia	P1153	1991	94 t	
Argos class	5		Portugal	Patrol boat	Estaleiros Navais de Vila Real de Santo António	NRP Hidra	P1154	1991	94 t	
Centauro class	4		Portugal	Patrol boat	Estaleiros Navais do Mondego	NRP Centauro	P1155	2000	94 t	
Centauro class	4		Portugal	Patrol boat	Estaleiros Navais do Mondego	NRP Oríon	P1156	2001	94 t	
Centauro class	4		Portugal	Patrol boat	Estaleiros Navais do Mondego	NRP Pégaso	P1157	2001	94 t	
Centauro class	4		Portugal	Patrol boat	Estaleiros Navais do Mondego	NRP Sagitário	P1158	2001	94 t	
Rio Minho class	1		Portugal	Shallow water patrol boat	Arsenal do Alfeite	NRP Rio Minho	P370	1991	70 t	Patrols the Rio Minho river.
Hydrographic vessels (4)
Stalwart class	2		United States	Ocean surveillance ships	Tacoma Boatbuilding Company	NRP Dom Carlos I	A522	1997 (1989)	2,285 t	
Stalwart class	2		United States	Ocean surveillance ships	Tacoma Boatbuilding Company	NRP Almirante Gago Coutinho	A523	1999 (1985)	2,285 t	
Andrómeda class	2		Portugal	Coastal research vessel	Arsenal do Alfeite	NRP Andrómeda	A5203	1987	245 t	
Andrómeda class	2		Portugal	Coastal research vessel	Arsenal do Alfeite	NRP Auriga	A5205	1988	245 t	

=== Auxiliary vessels ===
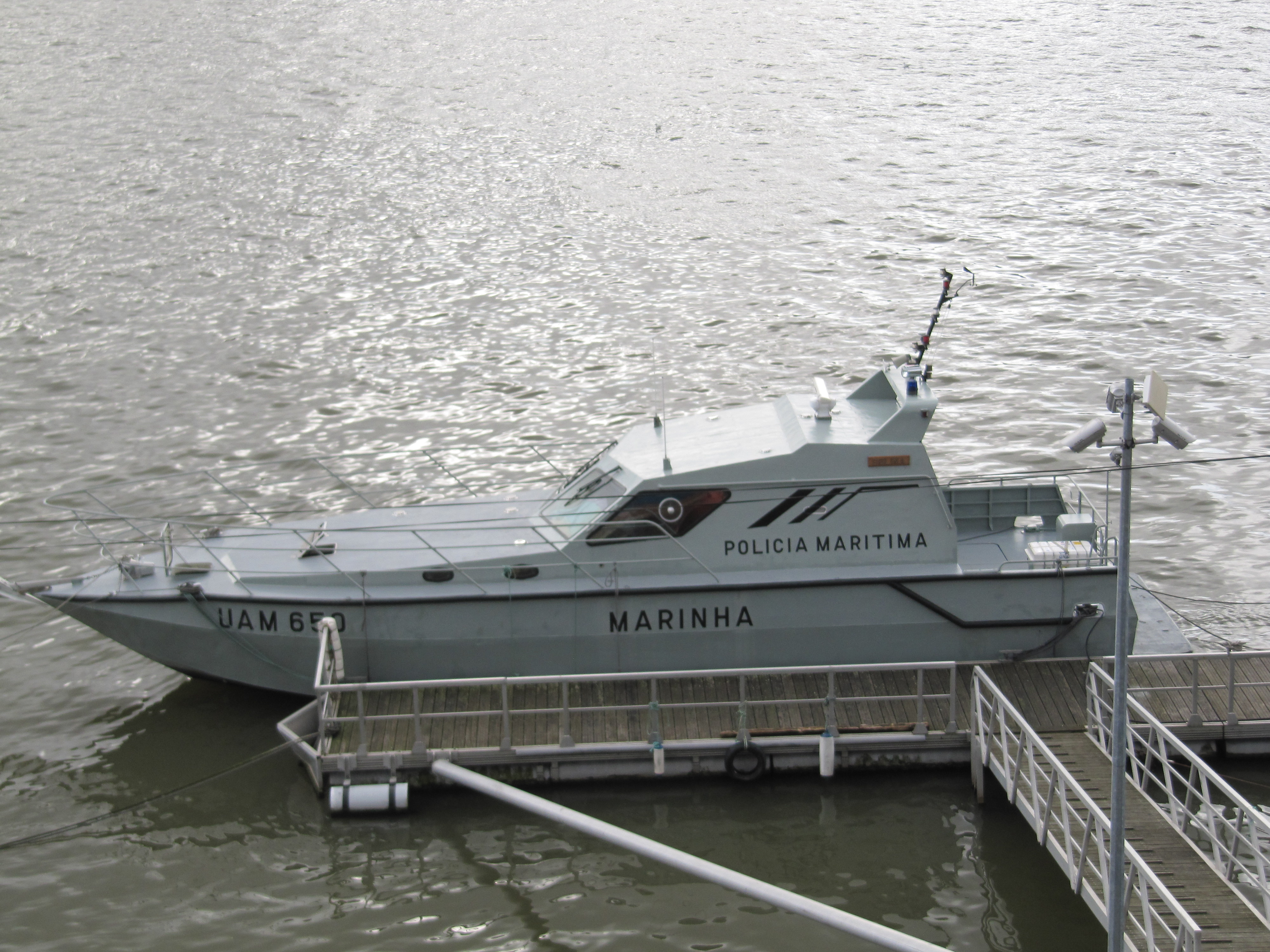
Auxiliary vessel UAM650, used for patrol on the Douro River

The Portuguese Navy has dozens of small vessels, of which 35 are Navy Auxiliary Units. All of these vessels belong to the Maritime Authority System.

- 12 rescue crafts;
- 7 captaincy vessels;
- 16 other vessels, such as armed speedboats belonging to Portuguese Marine Corps and anti pollution boats.

=== Unmanned vessels ===
- 2 × (Portugal) Trator do Mar Unmanned Oceanic Patrol Vessel;
- 1 × (Portugal) Unmanned Maritime Vehicle Hidrográfico X-2601;
- 1 × (Portugal) Unmanned Maritime Vehicle X-2701;
- 1 × (Portugal) Unmanned Maritime Vehicle X-2801;
- 1 × (Portugal) Unmanned Maritime Vehicle Orca;
- 1 × (Portugal) Tecnoveritas Unmanned Oceanic Patrol Vessel.

=== Unmanned underwater vehicles ===
- ? × (Portugal) OceanScan MS&T LAUV;
- 1 × (Portugal) OceanScan SABUVIS II (Biomimetic Underwater Vehicle);
- ? × (United States) Teledyne Marine Gavia;
- ? × (Italy) Graal Tech X-300.

=== Sailing vessels ===
Boat	In service	Picture	Origin	Type	Builder	Comm.	Displace.	Notes
NRP Sagres	1		Nazi Germany	Tall ship	Blohm + Voss	1961 (1937)	1,893 t	Ship previously owned by the Third Reich, confiscated by the USA in 1945, sold by the USA to Brazil in 1948, and acquired by Portugal in 1961, used as a training vessel.
NTM Creoula	1		Portugal	Tall ship	CUF shipyards	1937	1,300 t (full)	Used as a Portuguese Navy as a Sea Training Ship, which introduces the sea to the youth, and to promote Portugal abroad.
NRP Polar	1		Netherlands	Sailing vessel	Phoenix BV shipyards	1983 (1977)	77 t	Purchased in 1983.
NRP Zarco	1	–	Netherlands	Sailing vessel	Jongert BV shipyards	2015 (1983)	60 t	Purchased in 2015.

== Current armament ==
=== Submarine weapons ===
Model	Picture	Origin	Type	Calibre	Used with	Quantity	Notes
Torpedoes
BlackShark torpedo		Italy	Heavyweight torpedo (ASuW and ASW)	533 mm (21.0 in)	Tridente class	22	Ordered in 2006 (€41.5 million). At least two torpedoes were launched and recovered in March 2024.
Anti-ship missiles
UGM-84G Harpoon Blcok II		United States	Anti-ship cruise missile	533 mm (21.0 in)	Tridente class	–	Launched from torpedo tubes in special protective capsules.

=== Surface ships weapons ===
Model	Picture	Origin	Type	Used with	Launcher	Quantity	Notes
Surface to air missile
RIM-7M Sea Sparrow		United States	Semi-active radar homing short range surface-to-air missile	Vasco da Gama class	Mk 29; 1 × 8	–	
RIM-7M Sea Sparrow		United States	Semi-active radar homing short range surface-to-air missile	Bartolomeu Dias class	Mk48 Mod.1; 1 × 16	–	
RIM-162 ESSM Block IIa		United States	Semi-active radar homing medium range surface-to-air missile	Bartolomeu Dias class	Mk48 Mod.1; 1 × 16	–	Not yet delivered as of March 2026.
Anti-ship missiles
RGM-84D Block I / RGM-84L Block II		United States	Anti-ship cruise missile	Vasco da Gama class	Mk141; 2 × 4	–	Both classes upgraded with kit purchased from the Netherlands in 2024 (system HSCLCS F12, capable to launch RGM-84L Block II and RGM-84D Block I).
RGM-84D Block I / RGM-84L Block II		United States	Anti-ship cruise missile	Bartolomeu Dias class	Mk141; 2 × 4	–	Both classes upgraded with kit purchased from the Netherlands in 2024 (system HSCLCS F12, capable to launch RGM-84L Block II and RGM-84D Block I).
Torpedoes
Mark 46 Mod 5		United States	Lightweight torpedo (ASW); 324 mm (12.8 in)	Vasco da Gama class	Mk.32 Mod.5; 2 × 2	–	
Mark 46 Mod 5		United States	Lightweight torpedo (ASW); 324 mm (12.8 in)	Bartolomeu Dias class	Mk.32 Mod.9; 2 × 2	–	
Naval mines
Mark 55 Mod 2		United States	Bottom mine 2,000 lb (910 kg)	Viana do Castelo class	–	–	
Naval guns
Modèle 68 CADAM		France	Naval gun 100x700mmR	Vasco da Gama class	–	3	1 cannon per ship of this class.
OTO Melara 76/62		Italy	Naval gun 76×636mmR	Bartolomeu Dias class	–	2	1 cannon per ship of this class.
Close range naval guns
Bofors 40mm L/60		Sweden	Autocannon; 40×311mmR	Cacine class	–	1	1 cannon per ship of this class.
Goalkeeper CIWS		Netherlands	CIWS; 30×173mm	Bartolomeu Dias class	–	2	1 cannon per ship of this class.
OTO Melara Marlin WS		Italy	Autocannon weapon station 30×173mm	Viana do Castelo class	–	4 (+ 6 for ships on order)	1 cannon per ship of this class.
Phalanx Mk15		United States	CIWS; 20×102mm	Vasco da Gama class	–	3	1 system per ship of this class.
Oerlikon 20mm L/65		Switzerland	Cannon; 20×110mmRB	Cacine class	–	1	1 cannon per ship of this class.
Oerlikon 20mm L/65		Switzerland	Cannon; 20×110mmRB	Centauro class	–	4	1 cannon per ship of this class.
Machine guns
M2 Browning		United States	Heavy machine gun 12.7×99mm NATO	Vasco da Gama class	–	–	
M2 Browning		United States	Heavy machine gun 12.7×99mm NATO	Bartolomeu Dias class	–	2	
M2 Browning		United States	Heavy machine gun 12.7×99mm NATO	Argos class	–	10	
FN MAG / MG3		Belgium / Germany	General purpose machine gun 7.62×51mm NATO	Bartolomeu Dias class	–	–	Pintle mounts for machine guns on the bridge of many ships. The FN MAG is the standard issue machine gun in service in the Portuguese armed forces. For older ships, it's the MG3 that is used.
FN MAG / MG3		Belgium / Germany	General purpose machine gun 7.62×51mm NATO	Viana do Castelo class	–	–	Pintle mounts for machine guns on the bridge of many ships. The FN MAG is the standard issue machine gun in service in the Portuguese armed forces. For older ships, it's the MG3 that is used.
Heckler&Koch HK21		Germany	Light machine gun 5.56×45mm	Rio Minho class	–	–	
Decoys
Mark 36 SRBOC		United States	Decoy launching system (DLS)	Bartolomeu Dias class	Mk 36; 2 × 6	–	
Mark 36 SRBOC		United States	Decoy launching system (DLS)	Vasco da Gama class	Mk 36; 2 × 6	–	

== Future fleet ==
=== Ships procured ===
==== Surface fleet ====
Class	Ordered	Picture	Origin	Type	Builder	Ship	No.	Comm. planned	Displace.	Notes
Landing platform
MPSS 7000 class	1		Romania (Hull) Netherlands (Fitting out)	MPSS (Multi-Purpose Support Ship)	Damen	NRP D. João II	A888	2027	7,000 t	Missions: amphibious support; SAR; emergency / disaster relief; diving support; submarine rescue; helicopter operations; unmanned aerial and underwater vehicle operation; research
Frigates
FREMM EVO	3	–	Italy	ASW / multi-mission frigate		–	–	2029 - 2030	6,700 t	Agreement signed in July 2026, financed with the European SAFE loan mechanism.
FREMM EVO	3	–	Italy	ASW / multi-mission frigate		–	–	2029 - 2030	6,700 t	Agreement signed in July 2026, financed with the European SAFE loan mechanism.
FREMM EVO	3	–	Italy	ASW / multi-mission frigate		–	–	2029 - 2030	6,700 t	Agreement signed in July 2026, financed with the European SAFE loan mechanism.
Patrol ships
Viana do Castelo class 3rd batch	6		Portugal	Ocean patrol vessel		NRP Porto	P364	2027	1,750 t	€300 million contract signed in December 2023; Successor of the João Coutinho class and Baptista de Andrade-class corvettes. Construction has started as of 31st of March 2025.
Viana do Castelo class 3rd batch	6		Portugal	Ocean patrol vessel		NRP Lisboa	P365	2028	1,750 t	€300 million contract signed in December 2023; Successor of the João Coutinho class and Baptista de Andrade-class corvettes. Construction has started as of 31st of March 2025.
Viana do Castelo class 3rd batch	6		Portugal	Ocean patrol vessel		NRP Ponta Delgada	P366	2029	1,750 t	€300 million contract signed in December 2023; Successor of the João Coutinho class and Baptista de Andrade-class corvettes. Construction has started as of 31st of March 2025.
Viana do Castelo class 3rd batch	6		Portugal	Ocean patrol vessel		NRP Funchal	P367	2029	1,750 t	€300 million contract signed in December 2023; Successor of the João Coutinho class and Baptista de Andrade-class corvettes. Construction has started as of 31st of March 2025.
Viana do Castelo class 3rd batch	6		Portugal	Ocean patrol vessel		NRP Portimão	P368	2030	1,750 t	€300 million contract signed in December 2023; Successor of the João Coutinho class and Baptista de Andrade-class corvettes. Construction has started as of 31st of March 2025.
Viana do Castelo class 3rd batch	6		Portugal	Ocean patrol vessel		NRP Aveiro	P369	2030	1,750 t	€300 million contract signed in December 2023; Successor of the João Coutinho class and Baptista de Andrade-class corvettes. Construction has started as of 31st of March 2025.
Replenishment oilers
NRE+ programme "Navio Reabastecedor de Esquadra e Logístico"	2		Turkey	Replenishment oilers / logistics support vessel		NRP Luís de Camões	A5211	2028	11,000 t	Berrio-class (fleet tanker) replacement. To be supplied by STM.
NRE+ programme "Navio Reabastecedor de Esquadra e Logístico"	2		Turkey	Replenishment oilers / logistics support vessel		NRP D. Dinis	A5212	2028	11,000 t	Berrio-class (fleet tanker) replacement. To be supplied by STM.

=== Ships planned to be procured ===
==== Submarines ====
Class	Planned quantity	Picture	Origin	Type	Propulsion	Commissioning planned	Displacement	Notes
Additional submarines	2	Illustration	South Korea	Attack submarine	Diesel electric with an AIP system	–	–	
Additional submarines	2	Illustration	South Korea	Attack submarine	Diesel electric with an AIP system	–	–	

==== Surface fleet ====
Class	Planned quantity	Picture	Origin	Type	Comm. planned	Displace.	Notes
Patrol ships
"Disruptive" Coastal Patrol Vessels programme	8	–	Portugal	Coastal patrol vessel, trimaran layout	–	500 - 1,000 t	Under development by Vera Navis Ship Design (VNSD); Successor to the Argos, Centauro, Rio Minho and Tejo-class patrol vessels.
"Disruptive" Coastal Patrol Vessels programme	8	–	Portugal	Coastal patrol vessel, trimaran layout	–	500 - 1,000 t	Under development by Vera Navis Ship Design (VNSD); Successor to the Argos, Centauro, Rio Minho and Tejo-class patrol vessels.
"Disruptive" Coastal Patrol Vessels programme	8	–	Portugal	Coastal patrol vessel, trimaran layout	–	500 - 1,000 t	Under development by Vera Navis Ship Design (VNSD); Successor to the Argos, Centauro, Rio Minho and Tejo-class patrol vessels.
"Disruptive" Coastal Patrol Vessels programme	8	–	Portugal	Coastal patrol vessel, trimaran layout	–	500 - 1,000 t	Under development by Vera Navis Ship Design (VNSD); Successor to the Argos, Centauro, Rio Minho and Tejo-class patrol vessels.
"Disruptive" Coastal Patrol Vessels programme	8	–	Portugal	Coastal patrol vessel, trimaran layout	–	500 - 1,000 t	Under development by Vera Navis Ship Design (VNSD); Successor to the Argos, Centauro, Rio Minho and Tejo-class patrol vessels.
"Disruptive" Coastal Patrol Vessels programme	8	–	Portugal	Coastal patrol vessel, trimaran layout	–	500 - 1,000 t	Under development by Vera Navis Ship Design (VNSD); Successor to the Argos, Centauro, Rio Minho and Tejo-class patrol vessels.
"Disruptive" Coastal Patrol Vessels programme	8	–	Portugal	Coastal patrol vessel, trimaran layout	–	500 - 1,000 t	Under development by Vera Navis Ship Design (VNSD); Successor to the Argos, Centauro, Rio Minho and Tejo-class patrol vessels.
"Disruptive" Coastal Patrol Vessels programme	8	–	Portugal	Coastal patrol vessel, trimaran layout	–	500 - 1,000 t	Under development by Vera Navis Ship Design (VNSD); Successor to the Argos, Centauro, Rio Minho and Tejo-class patrol vessels.
Logistical transport ships
Navio Polivalente Logístico class	1	–	–	Amphibious transport dock vessel	2029	–	

== Future weapons ==
=== Surface ships weapons ===
Model	Picture	Origin	Type	Used with	Launcher	Quantity ordered	Notes
Weapon stations
EM&E Sentinel 30	–	Spain	CIWS; 30×173mm	–	–	47	Each equipped with a Mk 44 Bushmaster II autocannon.
EM&E Sentinel 2.0		Spain	Remote controlled weapon station 12.7×99mm NATO	–	–	47	Each equipped with a M2 Browning heavy machine gun.

== See also ==
- List of ships of the Portuguese Navy
- Lisbon Naval Base
- Portuguese Marine Corps
- Portuguese Naval Aviation
- Academia de Marinha
- Navy Museum
- Currently active military equipment by country
