= NRP Rio Minho =

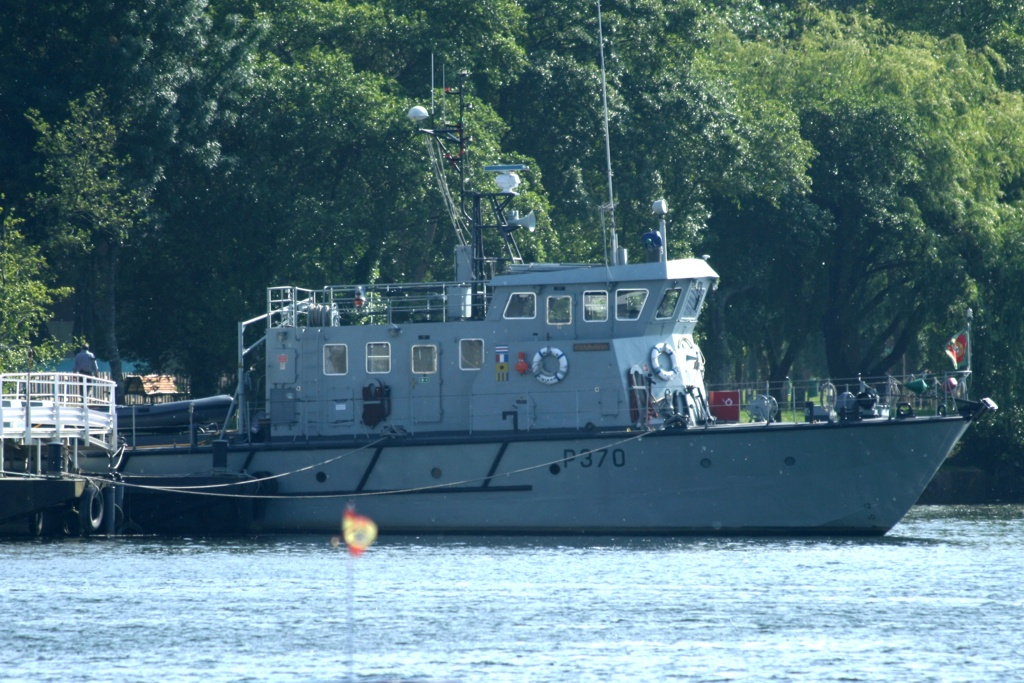
- The NRP Rio Minho

Class overview
- Name: NRP Rio Minho
- Builders: Arsenal do Alfeite
- Operators: Portuguese Navy
- In commission: 1991 – present
- Planned: 1
- Completed: 1
- Active: 1

General characteristics
- Type: Patrol boat
- Displacement: 70 tons
- Length: 22.4 m (73 ft 6 in)
- Beam: 6 m (19 ft 8 in)
- Draught: 0.77 m (2 ft 6 in)
- Range: 800 nmi (1,500 km; 920 mi) at 9.5 knots (17.6 km/h; 10.9 mph)

NRP Rio Minho is a patrol vessel designed by the Portuguese Navy to conduct patrol missions in shallow waters. Only one ship of the class was built, the NRP Rio Minho (P370), which is used to patrol the Minho River.

== See also ==
- Centauro-class patrol boat
- Argos-class patrol boat
- Arsenal do Alfeite
