= Maritime Authority System =

Maritime Authority System Autoridade Marítima Nacional
- Abbreviation: AMN

Agency overview
- Formed: 2002

Jurisdictional structure
- Operations jurisdiction: Portugal

In Portugal, the coast guard role is performed by several government agencies that, together, form the Maritime Authority System (Portuguese: Sistema de Autoridade Marítima, SAM). The SAM includes the Portuguese Navy, the National Republican Guard (GNR), the Portuguese Air Force, the Civil Protection Authority, the National Medical Emergency Institute and the Criminal Investigation Police (PJ).

The National Maritime Authority (Portuguese: Autoridade Marítima Nacional) or AMN is the service responsible for coast guard duties within Portugal. Until 2014 the AMN had been a directly reporting agency of the Navy until it was separated that year, although the Navy still provides its personnel and vessels. The function of AMN is performed by the Chief of Staff of the Navy himself, supported in this role by the Directorate of the Maritime Authority, which includes the Maritime Police, the Lifeguard Institute, the Lighthouse Department and the several harbourmasters. Besides the specific assets of the Directorate of Maritime Authority entirely dedicated to the coast guard role, the AMN also has at its disposal the other Portuguese Navy's assets that can be used both for military and public service missions.

The vessels operated within the SAM include the Maritime Police patrol boats, the Lifeguard Institute lifeboats, the harbourmasters’ harbour boats, the GNR Coastal Control Unit's surveillance boats and the Portuguese Navy's naval ships. The aircraft operated within the SAM include fixed-wing aircraft from the Portuguese Air Force and helicopters from the Navy and Air Force.

== Vessels ==
In addition to the vessels in the list below, all the Portuguese Navy ships also belong to the Maritime Authority System.

Class/Name	Origin	Image	Pennant number	Notes
Rescue vessels - Shipwreck Relief Institute
Vigilante class	Portugal		UAM 601	A total of 7 ships planned, with 4 built and 1 under construction in Arsenal do Alfeite.
Vigilante class	Portugal		UAM 602	A total of 7 ships planned, with 4 built and 1 under construction in Arsenal do Alfeite.
Vigilante class	Portugal		UAM 603	A total of 7 ships planned, with 4 built and 1 under construction in Arsenal do Alfeite.
Vigilante class	Portugal		UAM 604	A total of 7 ships planned, with 4 built and 1 under construction in Arsenal do Alfeite.
Rainha D. Amélia class	Spain		UAM 689	A total of 8 units received between 1997 and 2000, built by Rodman Polyships.
Rainha D. Amélia class	Spain		UAM 690	A total of 8 units received between 1997 and 2000, built by Rodman Polyships.
Rainha D. Amélia class	Spain		UAM 691	A total of 8 units received between 1997 and 2000, built by Rodman Polyships.
Rainha D. Amélia class	Spain		UAM 692	A total of 8 units received between 1997 and 2000, built by Rodman Polyships.
Rainha D. Amélia class	Spain		UAM 693	A total of 8 units received between 1997 and 2000, built by Rodman Polyships.
Rainha D. Amélia class	Spain		UAM 694	A total of 8 units received between 1997 and 2000, built by Rodman Polyships.
Rainha D. Amélia class	Spain		UAM 695	A total of 8 units received between 1997 and 2000, built by Rodman Polyships.
Rainha D. Amélia class	Spain		UAM 696	A total of 8 units received between 1997 and 2000, built by Rodman Polyships.
Rigid inflatable boats	Portugal		SR"XX"	The Shipwreck Relief Institute of the Portuguese Navy, has 39 rigid inflatable boats: 2 Navalport Yards ribs; 1 Searib's 1080; 1 XS RIB; 5 Valiant 850; 9 Searib's 860; 7 Atlantic 21; 1 Tornado; 6 SPES; 1 Searib's 780; 1 AVON; 5 Tsunami-18
Patrol vessels - National Republican Guard
Bojador class	Netherlands		PO1 Bojador	Received in 2021, it is the first National Republican Guard vessel with off-shore surveillance capability. Build by Damen Group.
Ribamar class	Portugal		LVI-11 Ribamar	Class consisting of 12 high-speed boats for interception and coastal surveillance.
Ribamar class	Portugal		LVI-12 Atalaia	Class consisting of 12 high-speed boats for interception and coastal surveillance.
Ribamar class	Portugal		LVI-13 Consolação	Class consisting of 12 high-speed boats for interception and coastal surveillance.
Ribamar class	Portugal		LVI-14 Azóia	Class consisting of 12 high-speed boats for interception and coastal surveillance.
Ribamar class	Portugal		LVI-21 Burgau	Class consisting of 12 high-speed boats for interception and coastal surveillance.
Ribamar class	Portugal		LVI-22 Salema	Class consisting of 12 high-speed boats for interception and coastal surveillance.
Ribamar class	Portugal		LVI-23 Zavial	Class consisting of 12 high-speed boats for interception and coastal surveillance.
Ribamar class	Portugal		LVI-24 Mindelo	Class consisting of 12 high-speed boats for interception and coastal surveillance.
Ribamar class	Portugal		LVI-40 Apúlia	Class consisting of 12 high-speed boats for interception and coastal surveillance.
Ribamar class	Portugal		LVI-41 Muranzel	Class consisting of 12 high-speed boats for interception and coastal surveillance.
Ribamar class	Portugal		LVI-42 Buarcos	Class consisting of 12 high-speed boats for interception and coastal surveillance.
Ribamar class	Portugal		LVI-43 Cabedelo	Class consisting of 12 high-speed boats for interception and coastal surveillance.
SR 1250 Patrol-C	Portugal		P26 Cassiopeia	Four high-speed boats built in Viana do Castelo by Navallethes, for an amount of 3 million euros. Each boat has 3 engines with 300 horsepower each, reaching speeds of close to 90km/h. All boats were received in 2024.
SR 1250 Patrol-C	Portugal		P27 Aquila	Four high-speed boats built in Viana do Castelo by Navallethes, for an amount of 3 million euros. Each boat has 3 engines with 300 horsepower each, reaching speeds of close to 90km/h. All boats were received in 2024.
SR 1250 Patrol-C	Portugal		P28 Draco	Four high-speed boats built in Viana do Castelo by Navallethes, for an amount of 3 million euros. Each boat has 3 engines with 300 horsepower each, reaching speeds of close to 90km/h. All boats were received in 2024.
SR 1250 Patrol-C	Portugal		P29 Mar dos Açores	Four high-speed boats built in Viana do Castelo by Navallethes, for an amount of 3 million euros. Each boat has 3 engines with 300 horsepower each, reaching speeds of close to 90km/h. All boats were received in 2024.
Zodíaco class	Portugal		LFA Zodíaco	Vessels used for river and coastal surveillance, build by Nautiber.
Zodíaco class	Portugal		LFA Aries	Vessels used for river and coastal surveillance, build by Nautiber.
Zodíaco class	Portugal		LFA Cancer	Vessels used for river and coastal surveillance, build by Nautiber.
Zodíaco class	Portugal		LFA Libra	Vessels used for river and coastal surveillance, build by Nautiber.
Zodíaco class	Portugal		LFA Scorpius	Vessels used for river and coastal surveillance, build by Nautiber.
Zodíaco class	Portugal		LFA Capricosnus	Vessels used for river and coastal surveillance, build by Nautiber.
Zodíaco class	Portugal		LFA Aquarius	Vessels used for river and coastal surveillance, build by Nautiber.
Rodman 33	Spain		Mar Creta	Vessels used for river and coastal surveillance.
Rodman 33	Spain		Mar Jónico	Vessels used for river and coastal surveillance.
Falcão da Madeira			Falcão da Madeira	Vessel used by the National Republican Guard in the Madeira islands.
Mar Egeu			Mar Egeu	
Embarcação de Alta Velocidade - EAV	Portugal		LX-120-EST	Also known as EAV Abalroada
Embarcação de Alta Velocidade - EAV	Portugal		LX-119-EST	Also known as EAV Castelejo
Embarcação de Alta Velocidade - EAV	Portugal		LX-118-EST	Also known as EAV Abalroador
Embarcação de Alta Velocidade - EAV	Portugal		LX-115-EST	Also known as EAV Mareta
Embarcação de Alta Velocidade - EAV	Portugal		VR-24-EST	Also known as EAV Farol
Embarcação de Alta Velocidade - EAV	Portugal		VR-28-EST	Also known as EAV Alcoutim
Embarcação de Alta Velocidade - EAV	Portugal		Name unknown	Seen in use during a Frontex mission
Embarcação de Alta Velocidade - EAV	Portugal		Name unknown	Seen in use during an exercise in Tagus river
Embarcação de Alta Velocidade - EAV	Portugal		Name unknown	Seen in use during a National Republican Guard video
Patrol Vessels - Maritime Police
Golfinho	Portugal		UAM 610	
Levante	Portugal		UAM 631	Built by Arsenal do Alfeite.
Tufão	Portugal		UAM 639	Built by Arsenal do Alfeite. This class was composed by 3 vessels.
Macareu	Spain		UAM 647	Built by Rodman Polyships. This class was composed by 8 vessels.
Preia-Mar	Spain		UAM 648	Built by Rodman Polyships. This class was composed by 8 vessels.
Bolina class	Portugal		UAM 650	2 units built by Arsenal do Alfeite in 2005. 1 unit sunk in 2025 during an Frontex mission in Greece.
Madeira	Portugal		UAM 697	Vessel seized in 2005 and reverted to the Maritime Police, can be equipped with G3 rifles. Entered active service in 2018.
Molivos			AMN-01-RG	Used has offshore patrol boat
High-speed interceptor	Portugal		AMN-"XX"-SG	The Maritime Police has around 15 High-speed interceptor boats
Rigid inflatable boats	Portugal		AMN-"XX"-SM	The Maritime Police, also operates a total of 14 patrol rigid inflatable boats
High Speed Boat - Portuguese Navy
Príncipe	Portugal		EAV???	In active duty since 2024
Auxiliary vessels- Portuguese Navy
Tróia	Portugal	(illustration)	UAM 102	Rigid inflatable boat in active duty since 2008, armed with an MG 3 machine gun.
Destemor	Portugal	(illustration)	UAM 103	Rigid inflatable boat in active duty since 2015, armed with an MG 3 machine gun.
UAM Creoula	Portugal		UAM 201	In active duty since 1987
Dom Fernando II e Glória	Portugal		UAM 203	It served the Portuguese Navy between 1845 and 1878. Since 1998 it belongs to the Navy Museum.
Vazante	Portugal		UAM 687	Active since 1994 and used to combat marine pollution.
Atlanta	Portugal		UAM 802	In active duty since 1984
Fisália	Portugal		UAM 805	In active duty since 1985
Mindelo	Portugal		UAM 810	In active duty since 1996
Niassa	Portugal		UAM 811	In active duty since 1996
Cacheu	Portugal		UAM 812	In active duty since 1996
Canopus	Portugal		UAM 814	In active duty since 2006
Sável	Portugal		UAM 830	In active duty since 1991
Albacora II	Portugal		UAM 852	In active duty since 1980
Alva	Portugal		UAM 901	In active duty since 1985
Zêzere	Portugal		UAM 913	In active duty since 1983
Sorraia			UAM 919	In active duty since 2009
