= NRP D. João II =

Portuguese naval vessel

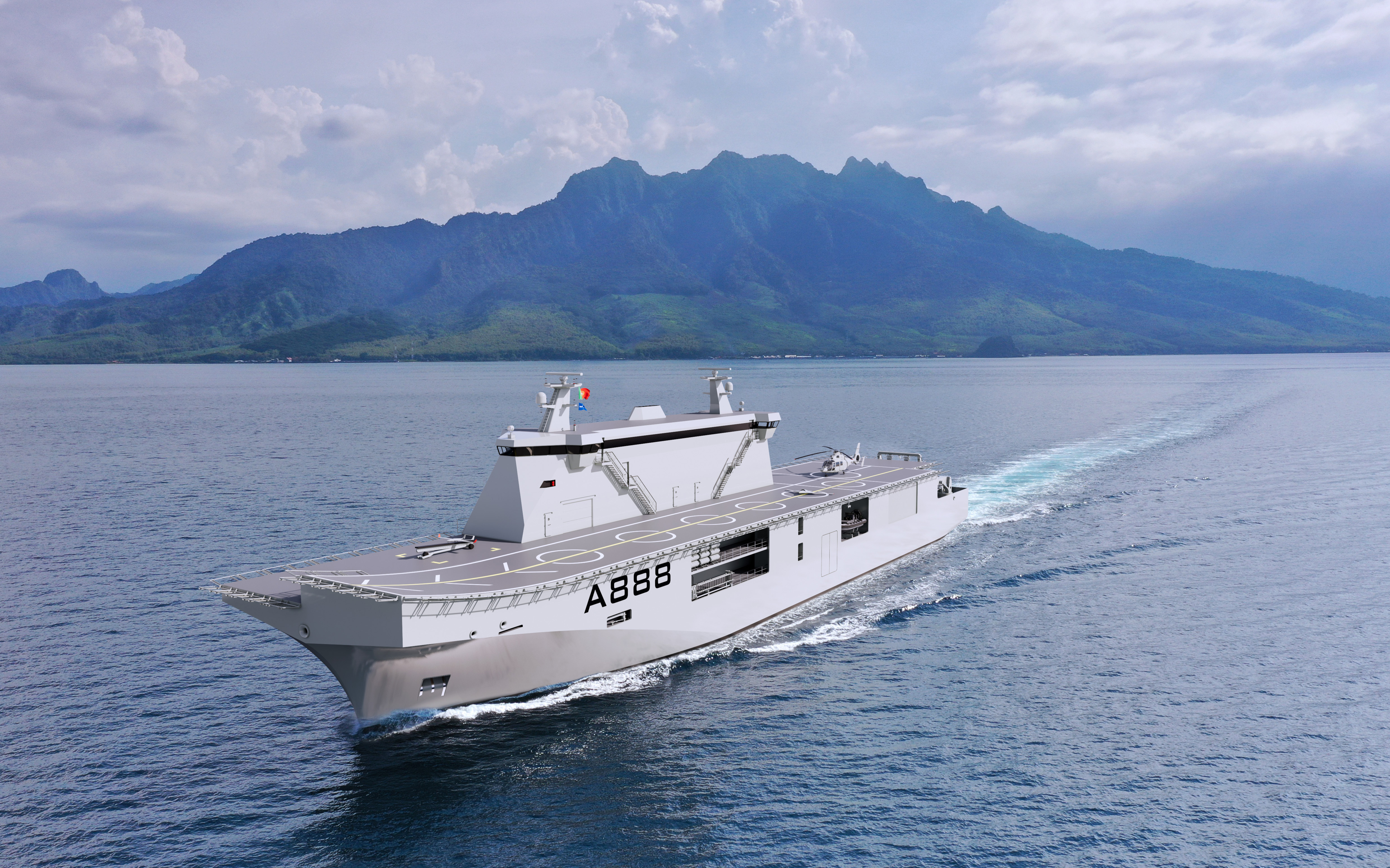

Class overview
- Builders: Damen Shipyards Galați
- Operators: Portuguese Navy
- Built: 2024-present
- Planned: 1
- Completed: 1

Portugal
- Name: D. João II
- Ordered: 24 November 2023
- Builder: Damen Group
- Cost: €132 million
- Laid down: 3 October 2024
- Launched: 7 April 2026
- Status: Awaiting sea trials

General characteristics
- Type: Multi-purpose ship
- Displacement: 7,000 t (6,900 long tons)
- Length: 107.6 m (353 ft 0 in)
- Beam: 20 m (65 ft 7 in)
- Propulsion: 2 Tier III motors
- Speed: 15 knots (28 km/h; 17 mph)
- Endurance: 45 days
- Boats & landing craft carried: 4
- Capacity: 18 containers/ 18 vehicles or 10 semi-rigid boats
- Troops: Up to 300 soldiers in emergency situation
- Complement: 48
- Aircraft carried: 2 × helicopters and UAVs
- Aviation facilities: 2 × hangars

NRP D. João II, also known as the Multifunctional Naval Platform, will be a multipurpose ship for the Portuguese Navy, capable of carrying out surveillance operations, oceanographic research, environmental and meteorological monitoring, as well as emergency evacuation missions. It is funded by the European Union’s Recovery and Resilience Fund (RRF) that is part of Next Generation EU.

== History ==
The contract for the construction of this ship was signed on 24 November 2023 with Damen Group. Construction will be carried out at the Damen shipyard in Galați, Romania and the ship is expected to enter active service in the second half of 2026. The keel laying ceremony took place on 3 October 2024. In October 2024 it was reported that Alewijnse had been contracted to complete the electrical installation of the ship. In January 2025 it was reported that Schottel will supply two EcoPeller SRE 560 and one TransverseThruster STT 3 FP for the NRP D. João II.

The ship was launched on 7 April 2026. It will enter service after conducting sea trials which are scheduled later in 2026. The Portuguese Navy aims to reach initial operational capability (IOC) in early 2027, and full operational capability (FOC) in 2028.

== Design ==
The design of the Multifunctional Naval Platform (PNM) was made by Damen based on the requirements laid down by the Portuguese Navy. The ship will have a total length of 107.6 metres (353 ft 0 in), and will function as an aerial, land and underwater drone carrier, increasing its ocean research and monitoring capacity. To perform marine ecology monitoring and oceanic research and surveillance, the ship will be equipped with laboratories and have accommodation for scientific personnel. When it comes to naval support the ship will have a 94-by-11-metre (308 ft × 36 ft) flight deck and hangars that can host unmanned aerial vehicles and helicopters. Furthermore, the PNM has a stern ramp for unmanned underwater vehicles and unmanned surface vehicles.

== General characteristics ==
- 94 metre runway for unmanned aerial vehicle;
- Deck for landing heavy helicopter such as the Portuguese Air Force AgustaWestland AW101s;
- 1 hangar capable of holding a helicopter;
- 1 hangar/workshop for unmanned aerial vehicles (drones);
- Catapult for launching drones;
- Capacity for 18 military light utility vehicles / 18 containers or 10 speedboats;
- Lower hangar with cranes and rails for handling containers;
- Capacity to transport 4 speedboats;
- Side door for vehicle entry;
- Crane with a capacity of 30 tonnes;
- Ramp for disembarking boats;
- Side hangar for operating a remotely operated underwater vehicle (ROV) with a cargo lift;
- Area to receive 100 people/military personnel with accommodations and facilities;
- Capacity for 42 scientists;
- In an emergency situation, it can accommodate a further 200 people in the lower hangar;
- Laboratories;
- A Role 2 NATO hospital;
- Accommodations for its garrison.

== See also ==
- List of active Portuguese Navy ships
