= NRP Vasco da Gama (F330) =

1989 Vasco da Gama-class frigate

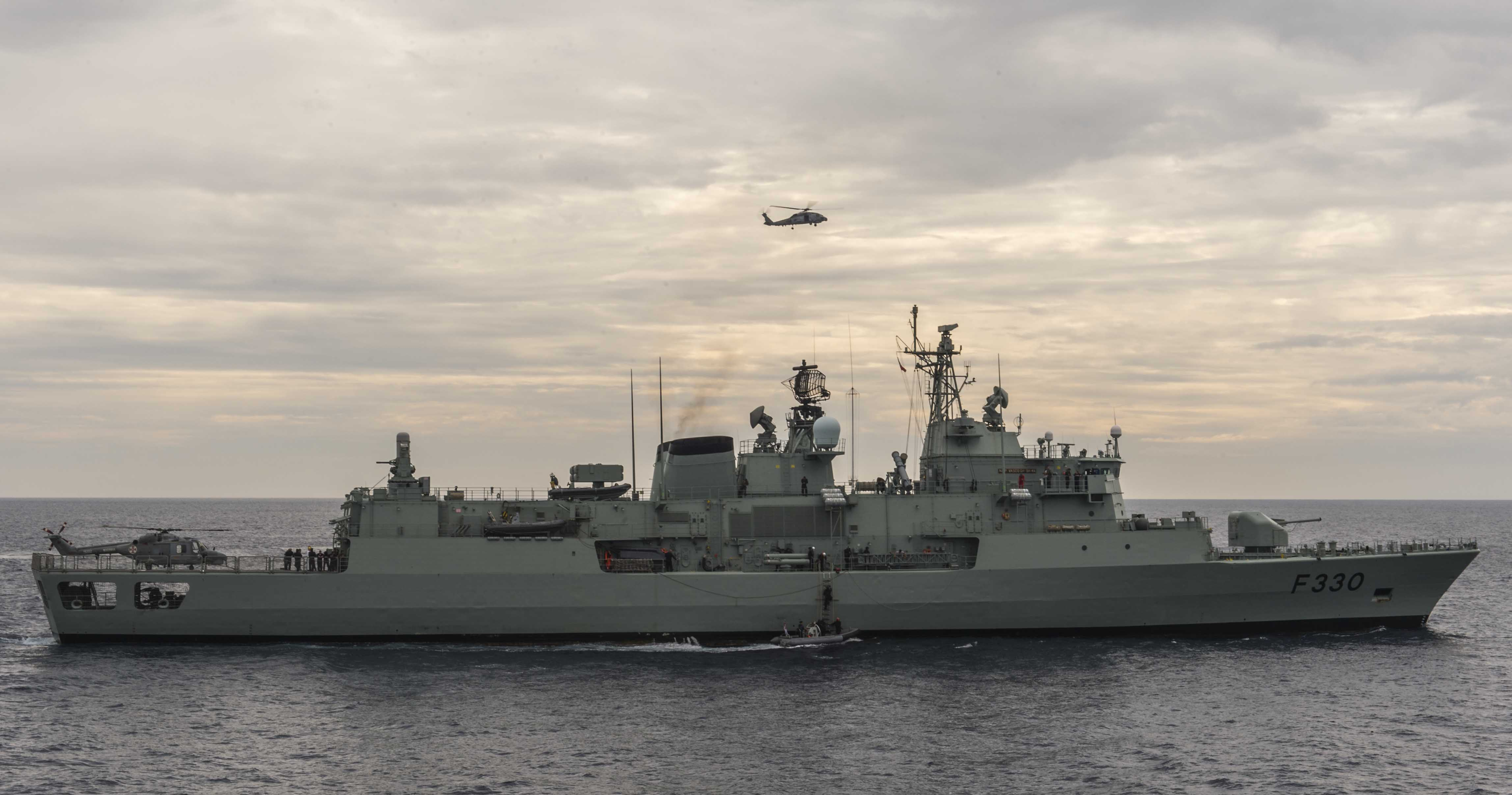
- NRP Vasco da Gama during Exercise NATO Trident Juncture.

History

Portugal
- Namesake: Vasco da Gama
- Builder: Blohm + Voss
- Laid down: 2 February 1989
- Launched: 26 June 1989
- Commissioned: 18 January 1991
- Identification: MMSI number: 263022000; Callsign: CTFJ
- Status: Inactive

General characteristics
- Class & type: Vasco da Gama-class frigate
- Displacement: 2,920 tons standard; 3,200 tons full load
- Length: 115.9 m (380 ft)
- Beam: 14.8 m (49 ft)
- Draught: 6.2 m (20 ft)
- Propulsion: 2 shaft CODOG, controllable pitch propellers; 2 MTU 20V 956 TB92 diesel-engines, 8.14MW each; 2 General Electric LM2500 gas turbines, 38MW each
- Speed: 32 knots (59 km/h) (gas turbines); 20 knots (37 km/h; 23 mph) (Diesel only)
- Range: 4,000 nautical miles (7,400 km; 4,600 mi) at 18 knots (33 km/h; 21 mph)
- Complement: 180; 19 officers; 40 petty-officers; 102 enlisted; 13 air crew; 6 boarding team
- Sensors & processing systems: 1 Thales DA08 air search D band radar; 1 Thales MW08 air/surface search F band radar; 2 Thales STIR 180 fire-control radar; 1 SQS510 hull mounted sonar
- Electronic warfare & decoys: 1 APECS II/700 ESM; Countermeasures: SRBOC launcher
- Armament: 1 100 mm Mod68 CADAM polyvalent artillery piece; 1 Phalanx CIWS 20 mm Vulcan anti-ship missile defence system; 2 × 3 12.75-inch Mk32 torpedo tubes in triple mountings; 2 Mk 141 quad-pack Launcher for a maximum of 8 RGM-84 Harpoon; 1 MK 21 Guided Missile Launching System for 8 RIM-7 Sea Sparrow
- Aviation facilities: Flight deck and hangar for 2 Super Lynx Mk.95 helicopters

NRP Vasco da Gama is a Portuguese frigate of the Vasco da Gama class operated by the Portuguese Navy. She was laid down by Blohm + Voss on 2 February 1989, launched on 26 June 1989, and commissioned on 18 January 1991.

== Service history ==
In 1995, Vasco de Gama spent five months deployed in the Adriatic Sea as part of Operation Sharp Guard, enforcing economic sanctions and an arms embargo against the former Yugoslavia, with the frigate inspecting 91 merchant ships during the deployment. In July 1998, she was deployed off Guinea-Bissau to rescue Portuguese and other European citizens threatened by the Guinea-Bissau Civil War. Vasco da Gama was deployed to East Timor as part of the Australian-led INTERFET peacekeeping taskforce from 16 November 1999 to 22 February 2000.
