= NRP Corte-Real (F332) =

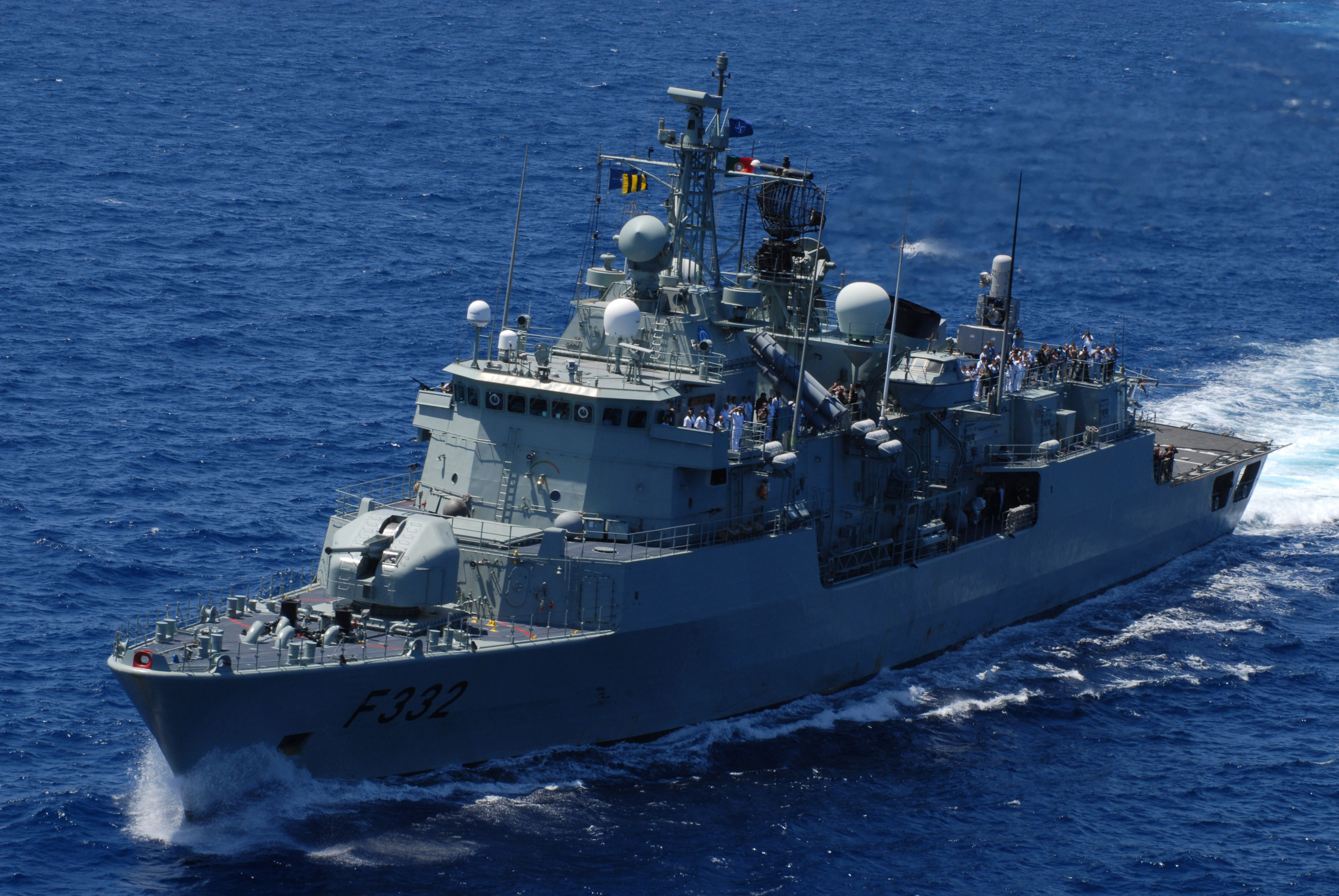
- Corte-Real in the Atlantic Ocean in 2009

History

Portugal
- Builder: Howaldtswerke-Deutsche Werft, Kiel
- Laid down: 20 October 1989
- Launched: 22 November 1991
- Commissioned: 1 February 1992
- Identification: MMSI number: 263024000; Callsign: CTFL
- Status: Active

General characteristics
- Class & type: Vasco da Gama-class frigate
- Displacement: 2,920 tons standard; 3,200 tons full load
- Length: 115.9 m (380 ft)
- Beam: 14.8 m (49 ft)
- Draught: 6.2 m (20 ft)
- Propulsion: 2 shaft CODOG, controllable pitch propellers; 2 MTU 20V 956 TB92 diesel-engines, 8.14MW each; 2 General Electric LM2500 gas turbines, 38MW each
- Speed: 32 knots (59 km/h) (gas turbines); 20 knots (37 km/h; 23 mph) (Diesel only)
- Range: 4,000 nautical miles (7,400 km; 4,600 mi) at 18 knots (33 km/h; 21 mph)
- Complement: 180; 19 officers; 40 petty-officers; 102 enlisted; 13 air crew; 6 boarding team
- Sensors & processing systems: 1 Thales DA08 air search D band radar; 1 Thales MW08 air/surface search F band radar; 2 Thales STIR 180 fire-control radar; 1 SQS510 hull mounted sonar
- Electronic warfare & decoys: 1 APECS II/700 ESM; Countermeasures: SRBOC launcher
- Armament: 1 100 mm Mod68 CADAM polyvalent artillery piece; 1 Phalanx CIWS 20 mm Vulcan anti-ship missile defence system; 2 × 3 12.75-inch Mk32 torpedo tubes in triple mountings; 2 Mk 141 quad-pack Launcher for a maximum of 8 RGM-84 Harpoon; 1 MK 21 Guided Missile Launching System for 8 RIM-7 Sea Sparrow
- Aviation facilities: Flight deck and hangar for 2 Super Lynx Mk.95 helicopters

NRP Corte-Real (F332) is a Vasco da Gama-class frigate operated by the Portuguese Navy. She was laid down by Howaldtswerke-Deutsche Werft on 20 October 1989, launched on 22 November 1991, and commissioned on 1 February 1992. The ship is named in honor of the explorers of the Corte-Real family: João Vaz Corte-Real, Gaspar Corte-Real, Miguel Corte-Real, and Vasco Anes Corte-Real.
