= Vasco da Gama-class frigate =

1991 Portuguese Navy subclass of MEKO 200-class frigates

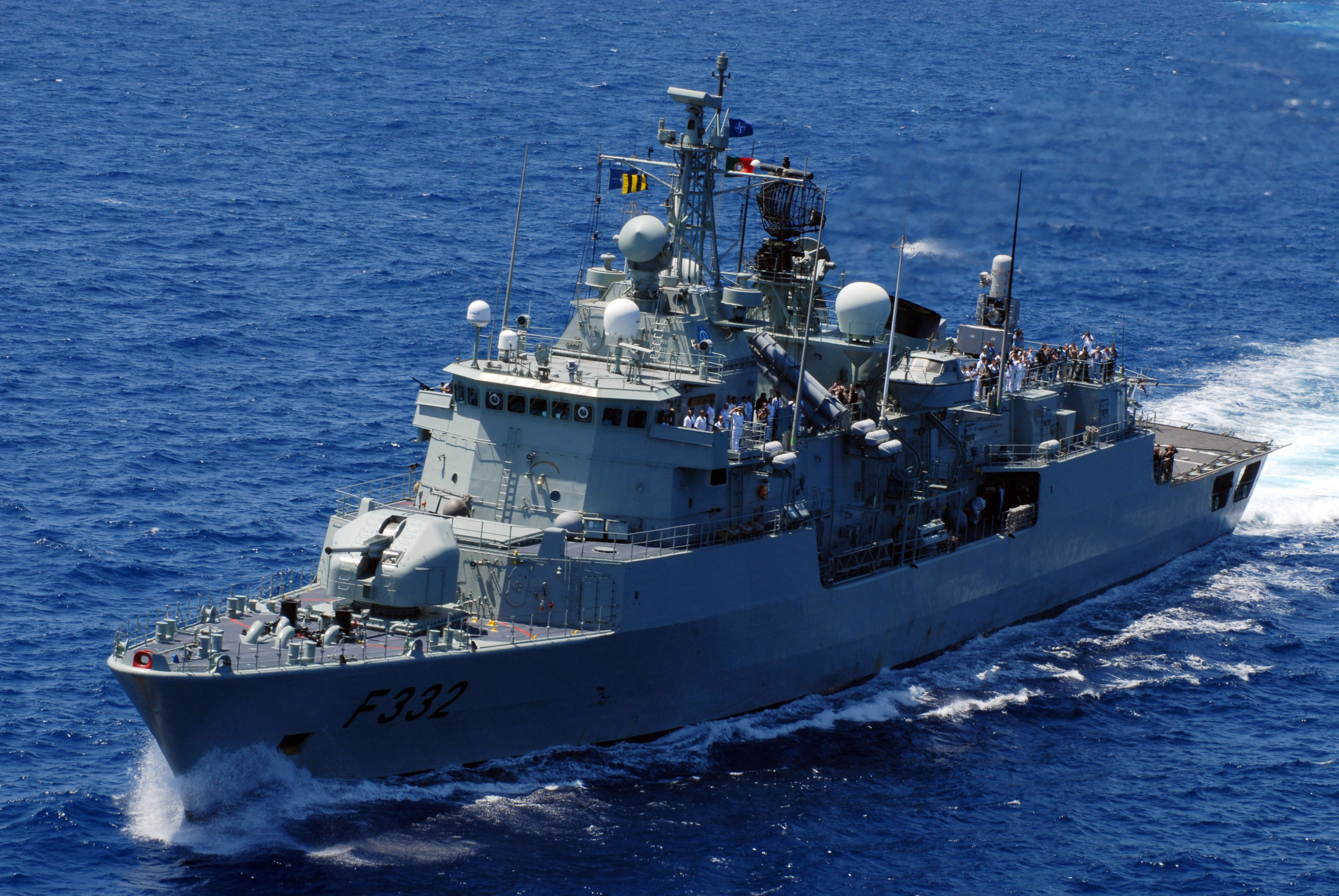
- NRP Corte Real

Class overview
- Name: Vasco da Gama, MEKO 200 PN
- Builders: B&V, Hamburg and; HDW, Kiel, Germany
- Operators: Portuguese Navy
- In commission: 1991–present
- Completed: 3
- Active: 2
- Laid up: 1

General characteristics
- Type: Frigate
- Displacement: 2,920 tons standard; 3,200 tons full load
- Length: 115.9 m (380 ft 3 in)
- Beam: 14.8 m (48 ft 7 in)
- Draught: 6.2 m (20 ft 4 in)
- Propulsion: 2 shaft CODOG, controllable pitch propellers; 2 MTU 20V 956 TB92 diesel-engines, 8.14 MW each; 2 General Electric LM2500 gas turbines, 38 MW total
- Speed: 32 knots (59 km/h; 37 mph) (gas turbines); 20 knots (37 km/h; 23 mph) (Diesel only)
- Range: 4,000 nmi (7,400 km; 4,600 mi) at 18 knots (33 km/h; 21 mph)
- Complement: 180; 19 officers; 40 petty-officers; 102 enlisted; 13 air crew; 6 boarding team
- Sensors & processing systems: 1 Thales DA08 air search D band radar; 1 Thales MW08 air/surface search F band radar; 2 Thales STIR 180 fire-control radar; 1 SQS510 hull mounted sonar
- Electronic warfare & decoys: 1 APECS II/700 ESM; Countermeasures: SRBOC launcher
- Armament: 1 × 100 mm Mod68 CADAM polyvalent artillery piece; 1 × Phalanx CIWS 20 mm Vulcan anti-ship missile defence system; 2 × 3 12.75-inch Mark 46 torpedo in triple mountings; 2 × Mk 141 quad-pack Launcher for a maximum of 8 RGM-84 Harpoon; 1 × MK 21 Guided Missile Launching System for 8 RIM-7 Sea Sparrow
- Aviation facilities: Flight deck and hangar for 2 Super Lynx Mk.95 helicopters

The Vasco da Gama class is a class of frigates of the Portuguese Navy. Named in honor of the Portuguese explorer Vasco da Gama, the ships are based on the German MEKO 200 design, and are Portugal's major surface ships. Portugal operates three ships of this class, which were built in Hamburg by Blohm + Voss (B&V) and by Howaldtswerke-Deutsche Werft (HDW) in Kiel, using modular construction techniques.

The project for the construction of three frigates of this class was authorized by the Portuguese Government in 1985, five years after the request of the Portuguese Navy for the acquisition of new surface ships. According to Conway's, 60% of the funding for these ships came from NATO military aid. Similar ships have been built for the navies of Greece, Turkey, Australia and New Zealand.

== Modernization ==
In 2019, the new Military Programming Law was approved by the Portuguese Assembly of the Republic, which provided an amount of 125 million euros for the modernization of the three frigates of the Vasco da Gama class. In November 2022, the order authorizing the Ministry of National Defence to proceed with the modernization, was signed, in order to be able to use the ships in scenarios of high intensity combat. Among the improvements to be made to the frigates is the incorporation of RIM-162 ESSM Block-2 missiles to replace the RIM-7 Sea Sparrow. The frigate NRP Álvares Cabral, within the scope of this modernization process, received in 2023 a new platform command, control and management system, installed by the Portuguese company Edisoft. The Chief of the Naval Staff, Admiral Henrique Gouveia e Melo, stated at the end of 2023 that the modernization program for the Vasco da Gama frigates will make it possible to modernize 2 frigates for high-intensity combat, namely the modernization or replacement of the SEWACO system. A third frigate will be updated in terms of platform management, communications systems and will also be capable of carrying out amphibious raids to project Portuguese Marine Corps forces. The modernization program for this class of ships will be made in Portugal by the Arsenal do Alfeite shipyard, that began in 2023 and will last until 2027 according to the navy's plans, with the last 2 years for the modernization of two frigates and the previous years to complete the upgrade of another frigate as a command platform.

== Ships ==
Pennant	Name	Laid down	Shipyard	Launched	Commissioned	Fate	Photo
F330	Vasco da Gama	2 February 1989	B&V, Hamburg	26 June 1989	18 January 1991	Being modernized at Arsenal do Alfeite.	
F331	Álvares Cabral	2 June 1989	HDW, Kiel	6 June 1990	24 May 1991	In active service	
F332	Corte-Real	20 October 1989	HDW, Kiel	22 November 1991	1 February 1992	In active service	

== See also ==
- List of frigate classes in service

Equivalent frigates of the same era

- Karel Doorman class
- Brandenburg class
- Anzac class
- Type 23
- Halifax class
- Neustrashimy class
- G class
- Kang Ding class
