= Centauro-class patrol boat =

Class of patrol boats in the Portuguese Navy

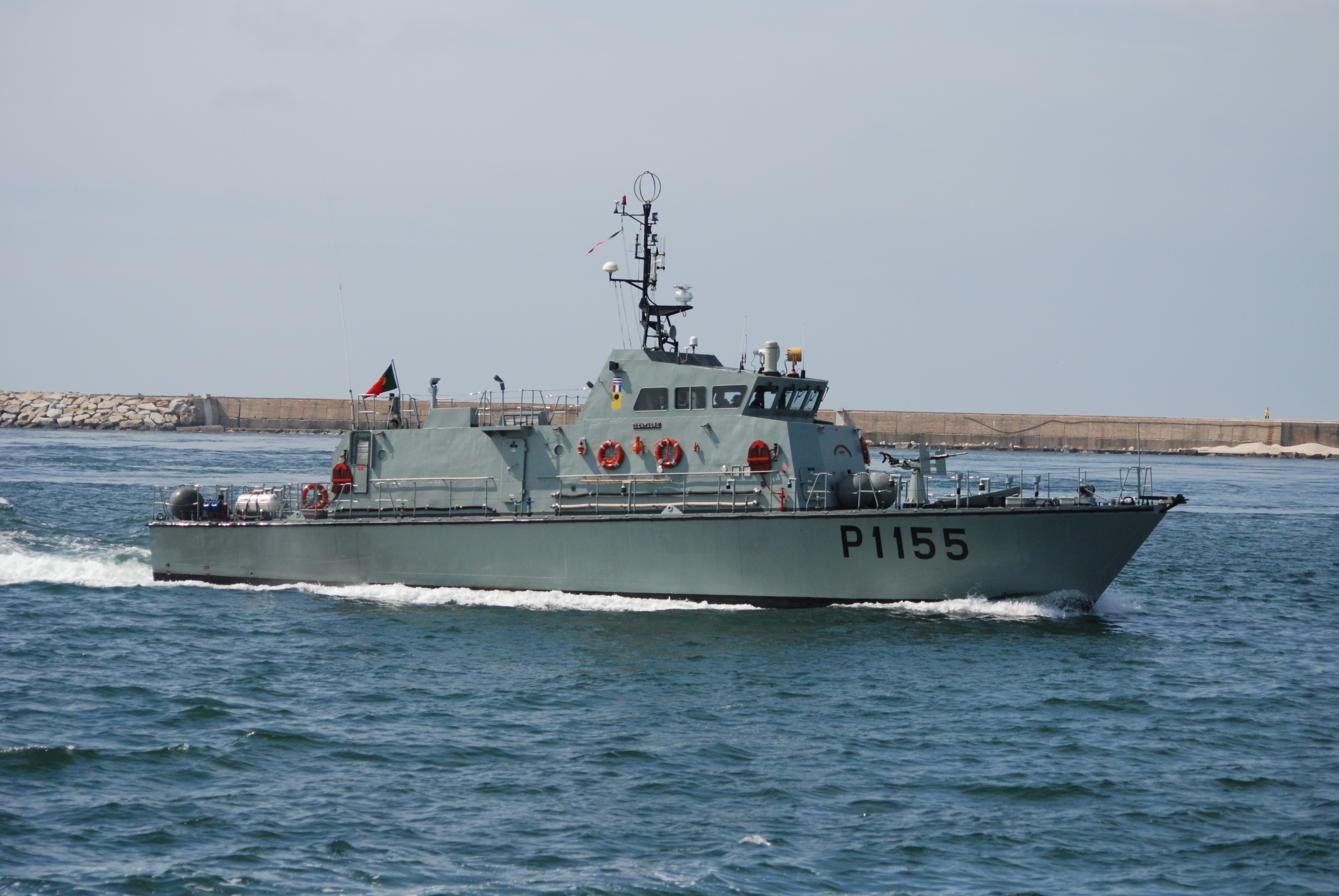
- NRP Centauro

Class overview
- Name: Centauro
- Builders: Arsenal do Alfeite, Estaleiros Navais do Mondego
- Operators: Portuguese Navy
- Preceded by: Argos class
- In commission: 2000–present
- Completed: 4
- Active: 4

General characteristics
- Type: Patrol boat
- Displacement: 94 t (93 long tons) fully loaded
- Length: 28.4 m (93 ft 2 in)
- Beam: 5.95 m (19 ft 6 in)
- Draught: 1.45 m (4 ft 9 in)
- Propulsion: 2 × Cummins KTA-50-M2 diesel engines, 2,700 kW (3,600 hp)
- Speed: 26 knots (48 km/h; 30 mph)
- Range: 1,350 nmi (2,500 km; 1,550 mi) at 15 knots (28 km/h; 17 mph)
- Complement: 8
- Armament: 1 × Oerlikon 20 mm (0.79 in) gun

The Centauro-class patrol boat is a series of four patrol boats in service with the Portuguese Navy. It is an evolution of the preceding Argos class. This class is meant for fisheries inspection and control duties mainly in the Mainland Portugal shores – with some sporadic presence in the Madeira Archipelago. The Centauro class is Portuguese-designed and built at the Arsenal do Alfeite (Almada) and Estaleiros Navais do Mondego (Figueira da Foz).

== Design and description ==
The Centauro-class patrol boats are an evolution of the Argos class, constructed of aluminium instead of the Argos' glass reinforced plastic design. The Centauro class measure 28.4 metres (93 ft 2 in) long with a beam of 5.95 m (19 ft 6 in) and a draught of 1.45 m (4 ft 9 in). (Note: The Portuguese Navy website has the draught at 2.8 m (9 ft 2 in).) The patrol boats have a standard displacement of 82 tonnes (81 long tons) and 94 t (93 long tons) fully loaded. (Note: Saunders has the vessel's fully loaded displacement as 89 t (88 long tons).) The vessels are powered by two Cummins KTA-50-M2 diesel engines turning two shafts creating 2,700 kilowatts (3,600 hp). This gives the vessels a maximum speed of 26 knots (48 km/h; 30 mph), though they did make 28 knots (52 km/h; 32 mph) during sea trials. They have a range of 1,350 nautical miles (2,500 km; 1,550 mi) at 15 knots (28 km/h; 17 mph) or 640 nmi (1,190 km; 740 mi) at 20 knots (37 km/h; 23 mph). The Centauros are equipped with two Cummins 6BT5.95(M) diesel generators producing 150 kW of electricity. The ships can operate in sea state 3.

The patrol boats mount a single Oerlikon 20-millimetre (0.79 in)/70 Mk 4 gun for anti-air defence. The ships were equipped with navigational radar only. They also carry a 4 m (13 ft) launch carried on a launch-and-recovery ramp on the stern and the boat can be recovered at speeds up to 10 knots (19 km/h; 12 mph). The vessels have a complement of eight, including one officer. (Note: Wertheim has the complement at ten with two officers.)

== Construction and career ==
The class were ordered in 1998 as an improved version of the Argos class. They were designed and built in Portugal. Upon entering service, the vessels were deployed for fisheries protection, search and rescue and general patrol. The Centauros take part in some naval exercises and some training. In 2006, one boat of this class, NRP Sagitário, became the first Portuguese warship with a female commander, the second lieutenant Gisela Antunes.

== Ships ==
Pennant	Name	Builder	Commissioned	Status
P1155	Centauro	Arsenal do Alfeite	21 March 2000 (Note: Saunders has the date as 20 March and Wertheim, 1 February.)	Active
P1156	Oríon	Arsenal do Alfeite	27 March 2001 (Note: Saunders has the date as 20 March 2000 and Wertheim, 3 April 2000.)	Active
P1157	Pégaso	Estaleiros Navais do Mondego (Note: Wertheim has the two ships constructed by CONAFIL in Vila Real de San Antonio.)	27 March 2001	Active
P1158	Sagitário	Estaleiros Navais do Mondego	27 March 2001	Active
