= Argos-class patrol boat =

1991 patrol boat class of the Portuguese Navy

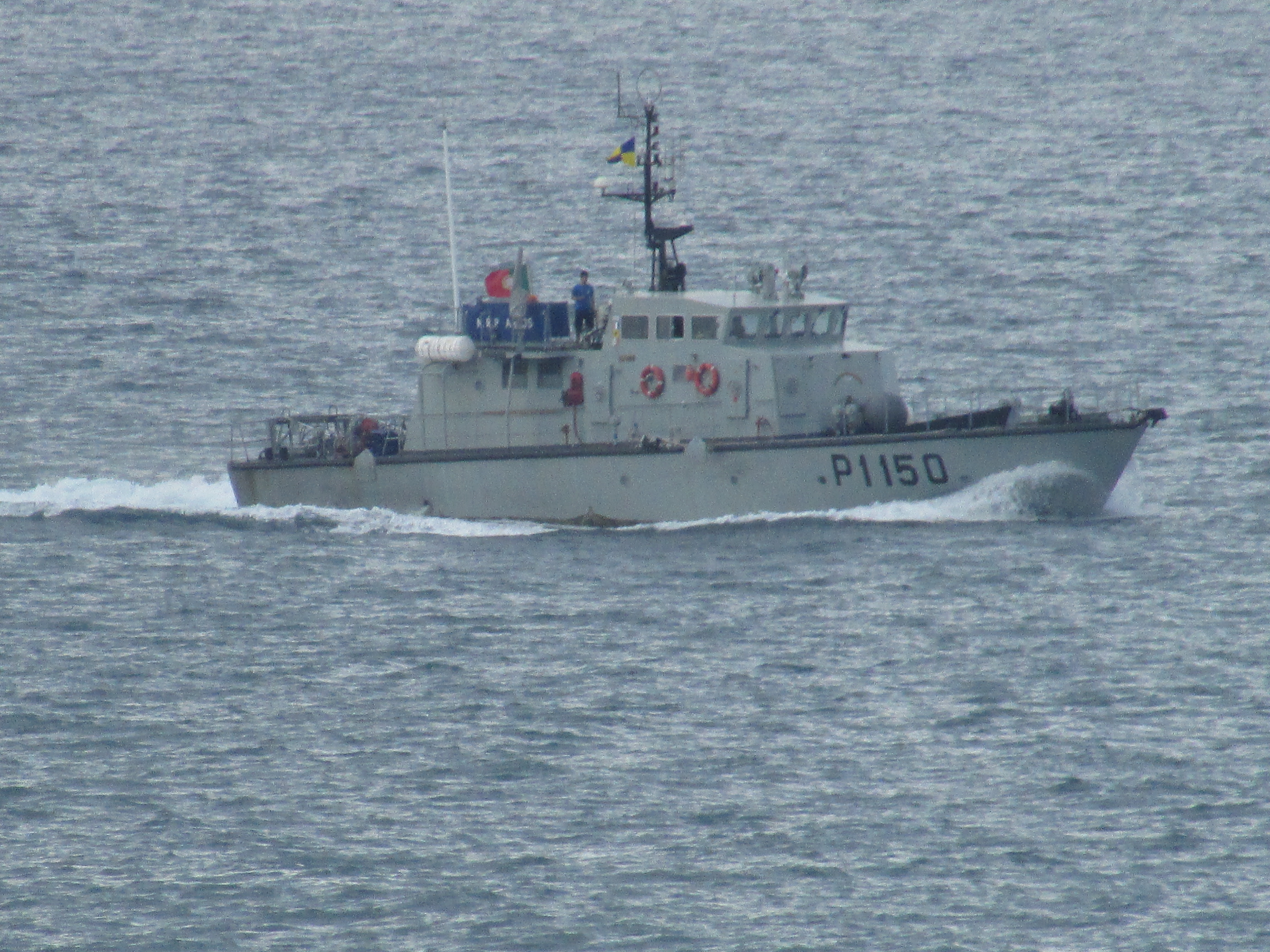
- NRP Argos travelling in Algarve coast near Albufeira.

Class overview
- Name: Argos
- Builders: Estaleiros Navais de Vila Real de Santo António
- Operators: Portuguese Navy
- Preceded by: Albatroz class
- Subclasses: Centauro class
- In commission: 1991–present
- Planned: 5
- Completed: 5
- Active: 5

General characteristics
- Type: Patrol boat
- Displacement: 97 tons
- Length: 27 m (88 ft 7 in)
- Beam: 5.9 m (19 ft 4 in)
- Draught: 2.8 m (9 ft 2 in)
- Propulsion: 2 diesel-engines MTU 12V 396 TE84 each with 3,500 hp (2,600 kW)
- Speed: 26 knots (48 km/h; 30 mph)
- Range: 1,350 nmi (2,500 km; 1,550 mi) at 18 knots (33 km/h; 21 mph)
- Complement: 8
- Sensors & processing systems: 1 navigation radar Kodden MDC 2210
- Armament: 2 12.7 mm MG

The Argos-class patrol boat is a model of patrol boat in service in the Portuguese Navy since 1991. This type of ship was designed by the Arsenal do Alfeite, Lisbon, but was built in private shipyards located in Vila Real de Santo António. The ships of the class are mainly employed in the surveillance and control of the Portuguese territorial waters, in Mainland Portugal and in the Madeira Archipelago. The ships are also employed in other missions as the search and rescue, maritime pollution control and force protection of combatant ships in confined waters.

Five ships were built, these being named after constellations.

In 2000, an upgraded version of the Argos class entered service in the Portuguese Navy. This new version was initially referred as the Argos (2nd series) class, but it is now usually referred to as the Centauro class.

It is to note, that from 1963 to 1975, the Portuguese Navy employed a class of large patrol boats that was also designated Argos class.

== Ships of the class ==
Pennant	Name	Commissioned
P1150	Argos	1991
P1151	Dragão	1991
P1152	Escorpião	1991
P1153	Cassiopeia	1991
P1154	Hidra	1991
