= Arsenal do Alfeite =

Shipyard in Almada, Portugal

Arsenal do Alfeite S.A.
- Industry: Shipbuilding
- Founded: 1928
- Headquarters: Alfeite, Base Naval de Lisboa, 2810-001 Almada, Almada, Portugal
- Products: Centauro-class fiscalization boat Argos-class patrol boat Albatroz-class patrol boat Bolina-class Vigilante-class Andrómeda-class
- Services: Shipbuilding
- Number of employees: 500
- Parent: idD Portugal Defence
- Website: Arsenal do Alfeite

Arsenal do Alfeite, SA is a company with an area of 36 hectares of implantation included in the Lisbon Naval Base. It is mainly dedicated to satisfying the needs of shipbuilding, maintenance, modernization and repair of the Portuguese Navy, other NATO and commercial navies, using advanced technologies, namely in the areas of electronics, optronics, armament, mechanics and electrical engineering. Alfeite's arsenal has already built more than 150 boats. Arsenal do Alfeite has a close relationship with Royal Moroccan Navy, repairing and modernizing ships since 2012.

== Installations ==
Arsenal do Alfeite SA facilities have a quality management system, certified according to the ISO 9001:2008 standard, and a set of testing and calibration laboratories accredited by the Portuguese Institute of Accreditation, according to the NP EN ISO/IEC standard 17025. Of note is its capacity for studies and projects for new vessels, modifications and conversions, as well as consultancy and the provision of specialized industrial services.

Arsenal do Alfeite includes:

- 35 technological areas for building and repairing ships;
- 672meters of mooring pier;
- 3 inclined planes of 150m, 120m and 53m, respectively;
- 1 floating dock 60m long and 12m wide;
- 1 dry dock 138m long and 18m wide;
- 1 Crane 40.0 tons x 20m - Dockable Pier 1;
- 1 Crane 3 tons x 20m - Dockable Pier / Floating Dock;
- 1 Crane 12 tons x 20m - Inclined Plan 1;
- 1 Crane 5.0 tons x 27m - Dry Dock.

== Shipbuilding ==
=== Ships built ===
- Centauro-class patrol boats;
- Argos-class patrol boats;
- Albatroz-class patrol boat;
- Bolina-class;
- Vigilante-class;
- Andrómeda-class;
- Levante-class;
- NRP Schultz Xavier;
- Bombarda landing craft-class

== Works ==
=== Modernizations ===
- Vasco da Gama-class frigates (MEKO 200PN) - work carried out in conjunction with the Navalrocha shipyard;

=== Overhauls ===
- Tridente-class submarines (Type 214 submarines);

=== Repairs ===
- Tridente-class submarines (Type 214 submarines);
- Vasco da Gama-class frigates (MEKO 200PN);
- Bartolomeu Dias-class frigates (Karel Doorman-class frigates);
- João Coutinho-class corvette;
- Baptista de Andrade-class;
- Viana do Castelo-class patrol vessels;
- Tejo-class patrol vessels (Flyvefisken-class patrol vessels);
- Moroccan frigate Hassan II (Floréal-class frigate);
- Osprey 55-class gunboat (El Tawfiq)
- OPV-64-class patrol vessels (Raïs Charkaoui and Raïs Maaninou);
- Ad Dakhla CLS-class (Daoud Ben Aicha);
- Stalwart-class ocean surveillance ship.

== Weapons repair ==
Arsenal do Alfeite can repair and replace the following weapons:

- French 100 mm naval gun;
- OTO Melara 76 mm;
- Bofors 40 mm gun;
- RIM-7 Sea Sparrow;
- Harpoon (missile);
- Phalanx CIWS;
- Goalkeeper CIWS;
- Mk 32 torpedo launcher;
- Mark 46 torpedo;
- Black Shark torpedo;
- MK55 Mines;
- Mark 36 SRBOC.

== Gallery ==
Vessels build at Arsenal do Alfeite

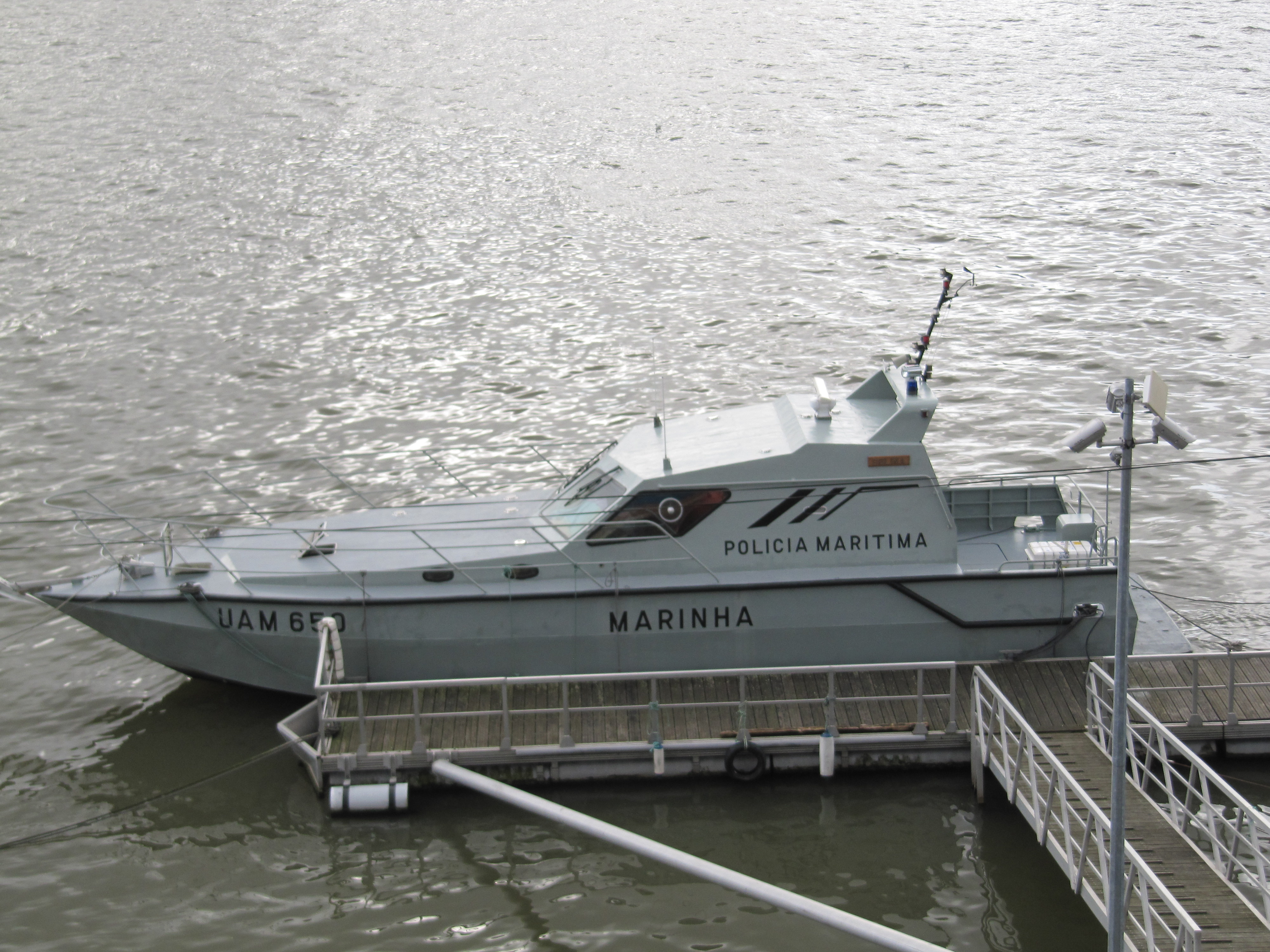
Bolina-class patrol boat

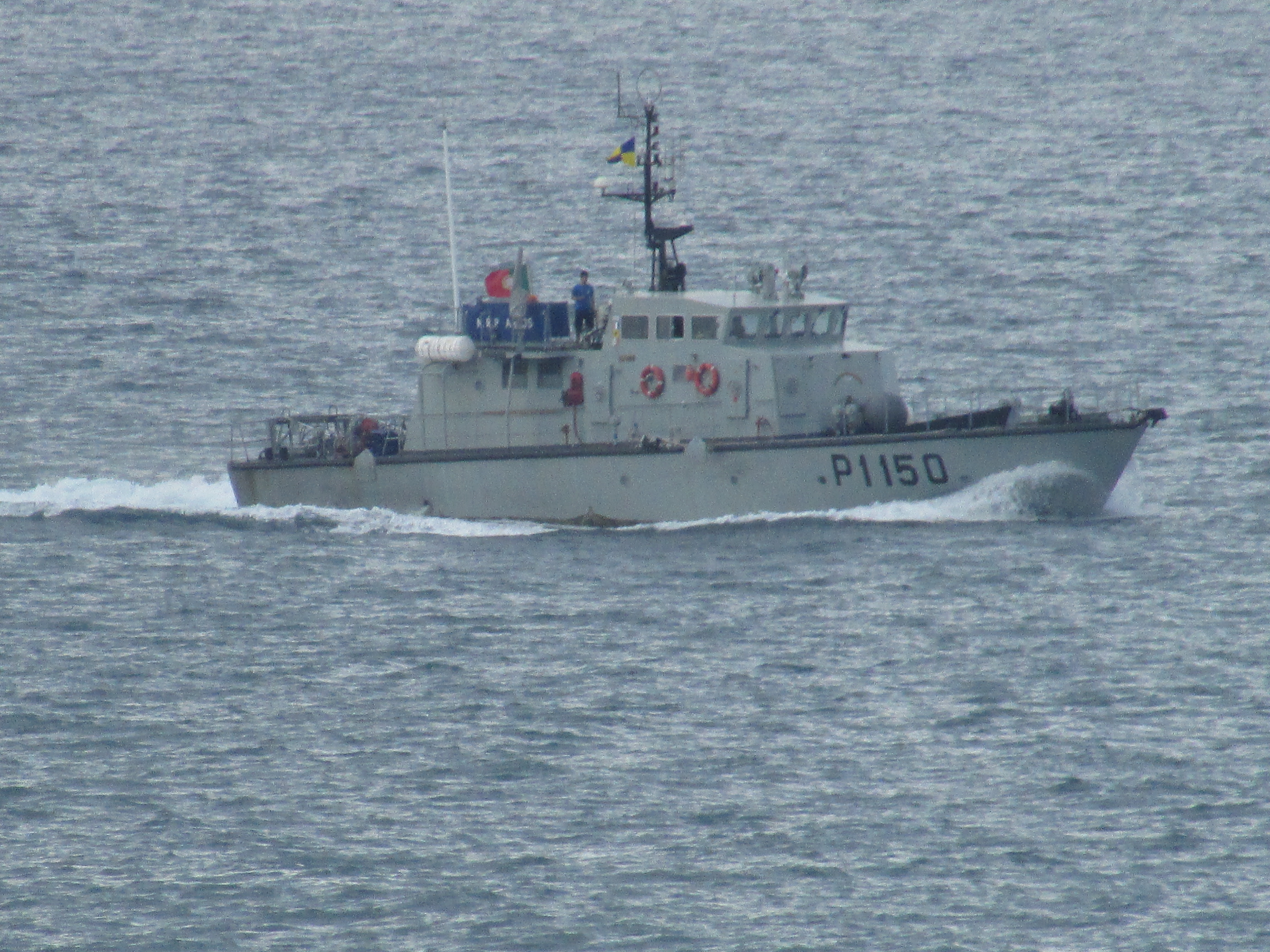
Argos-class patrol boat (P1150)

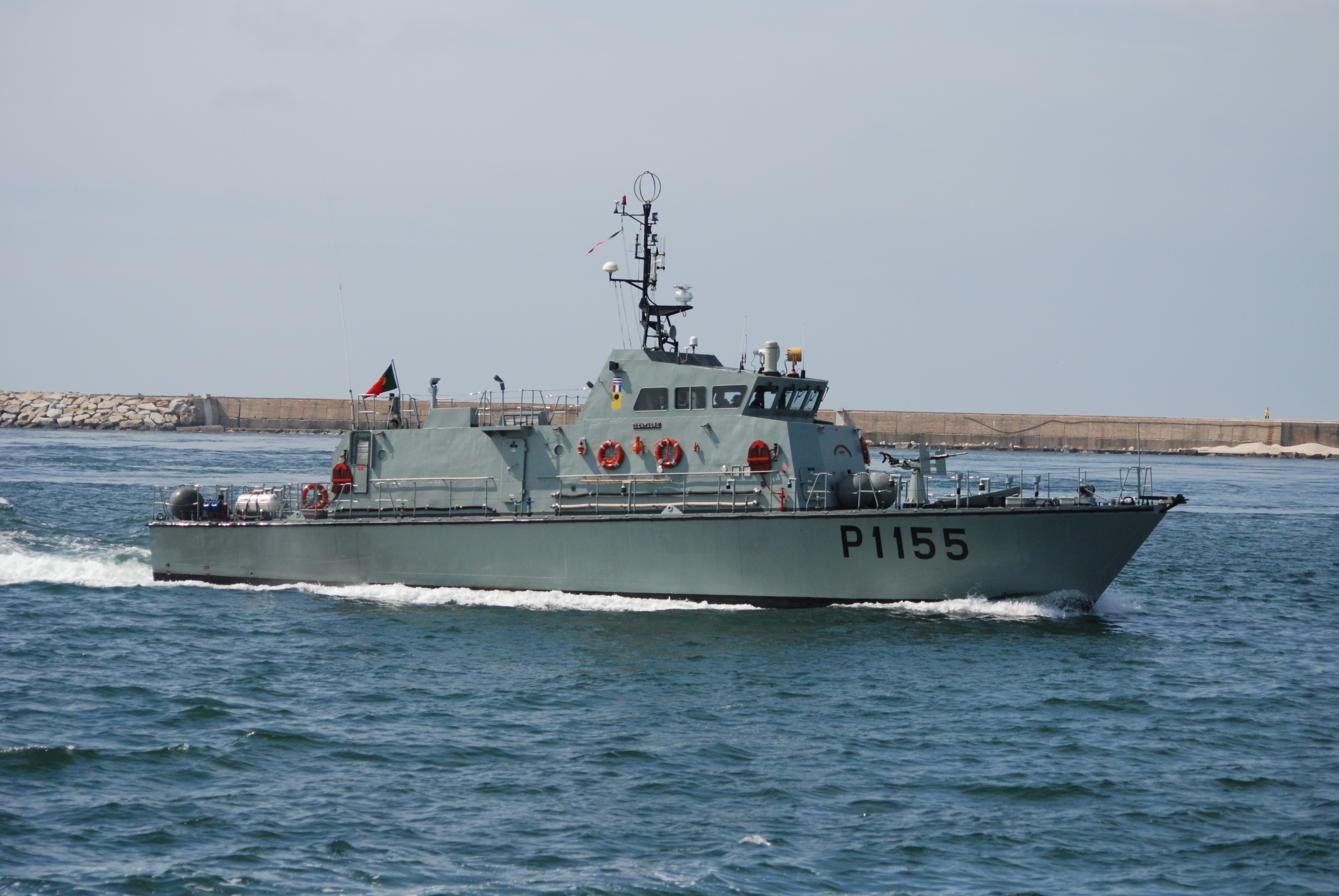
Centauro-class patrol boat (P1155)

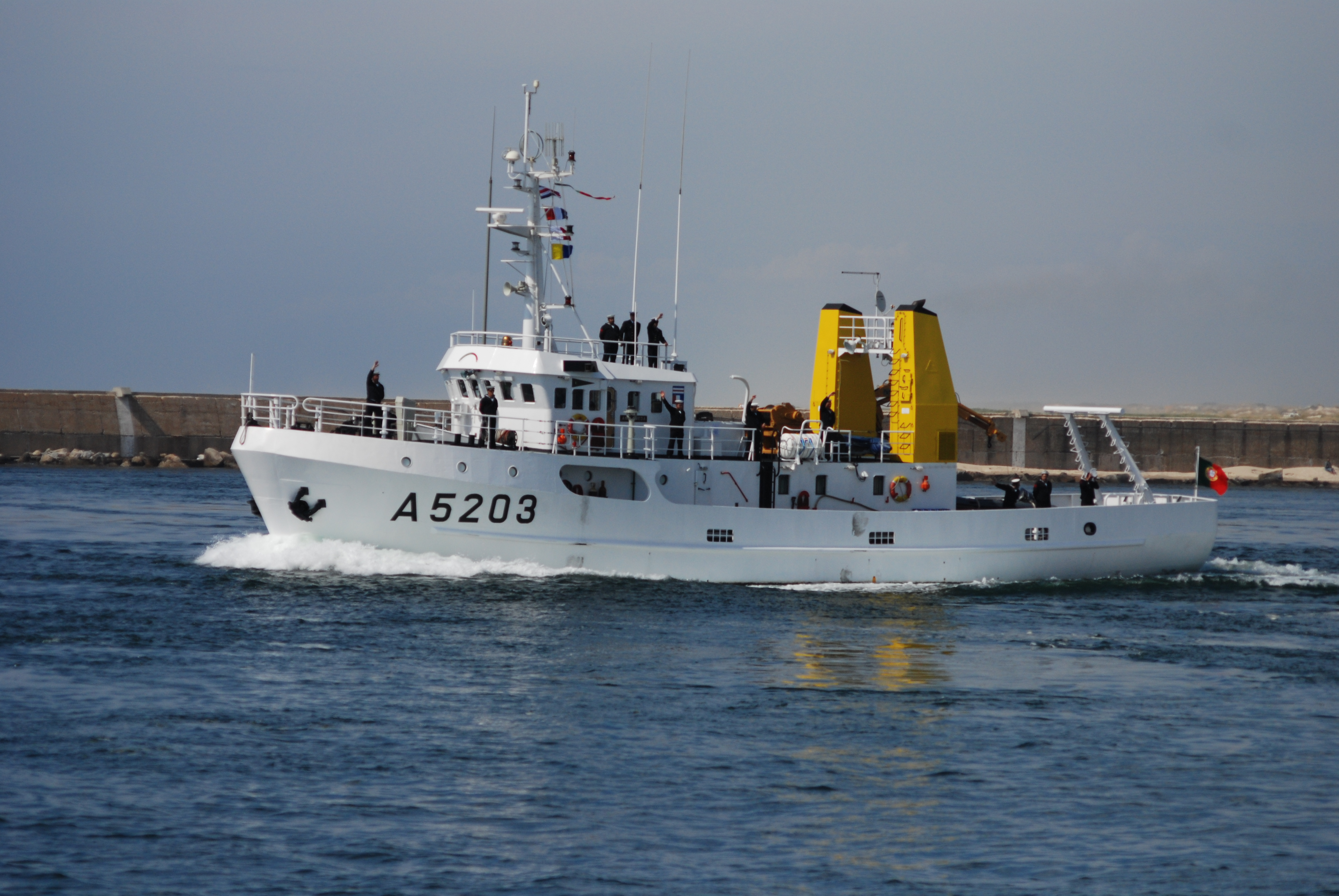
Andrómeda-class research vessel

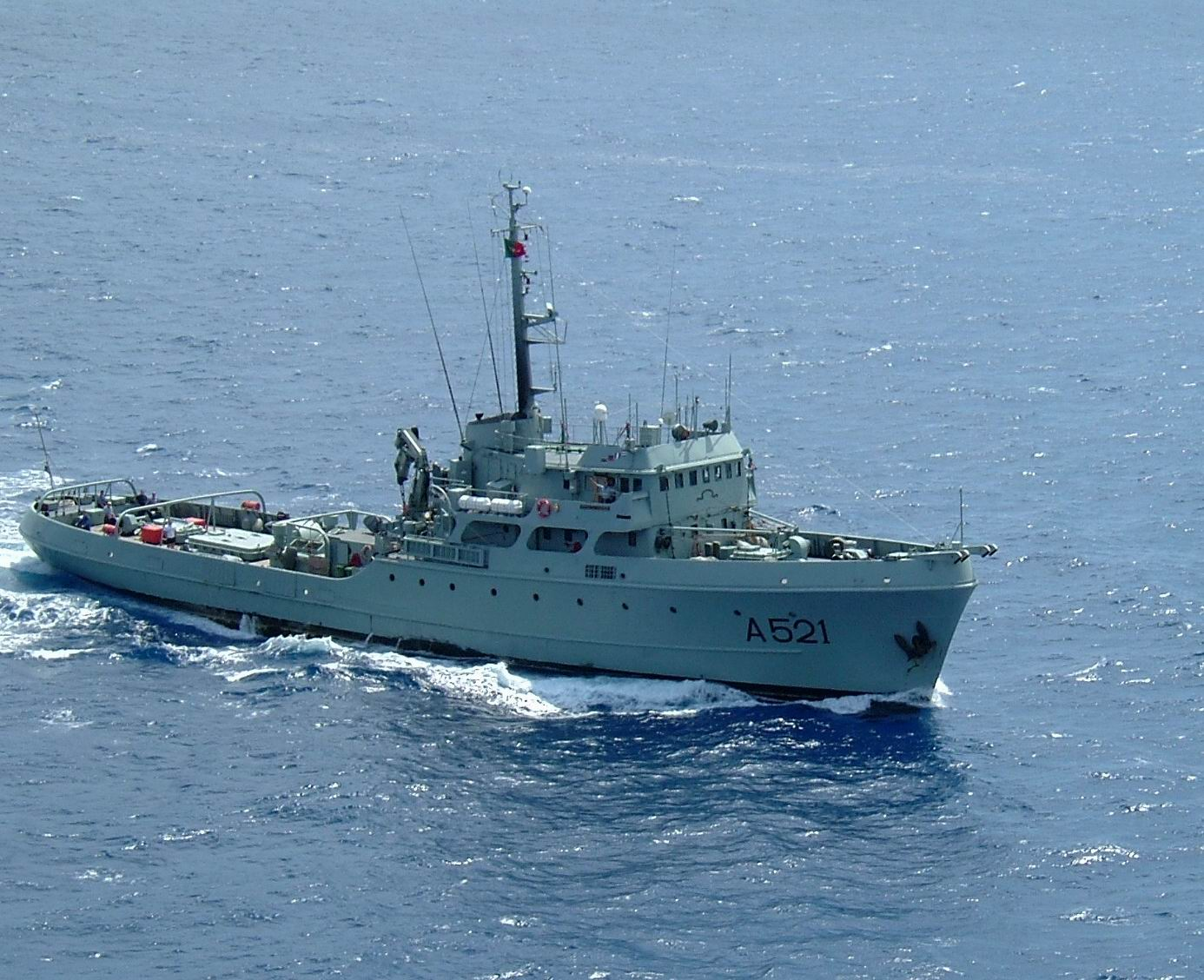
NRP Schultz Xavier buoy tender

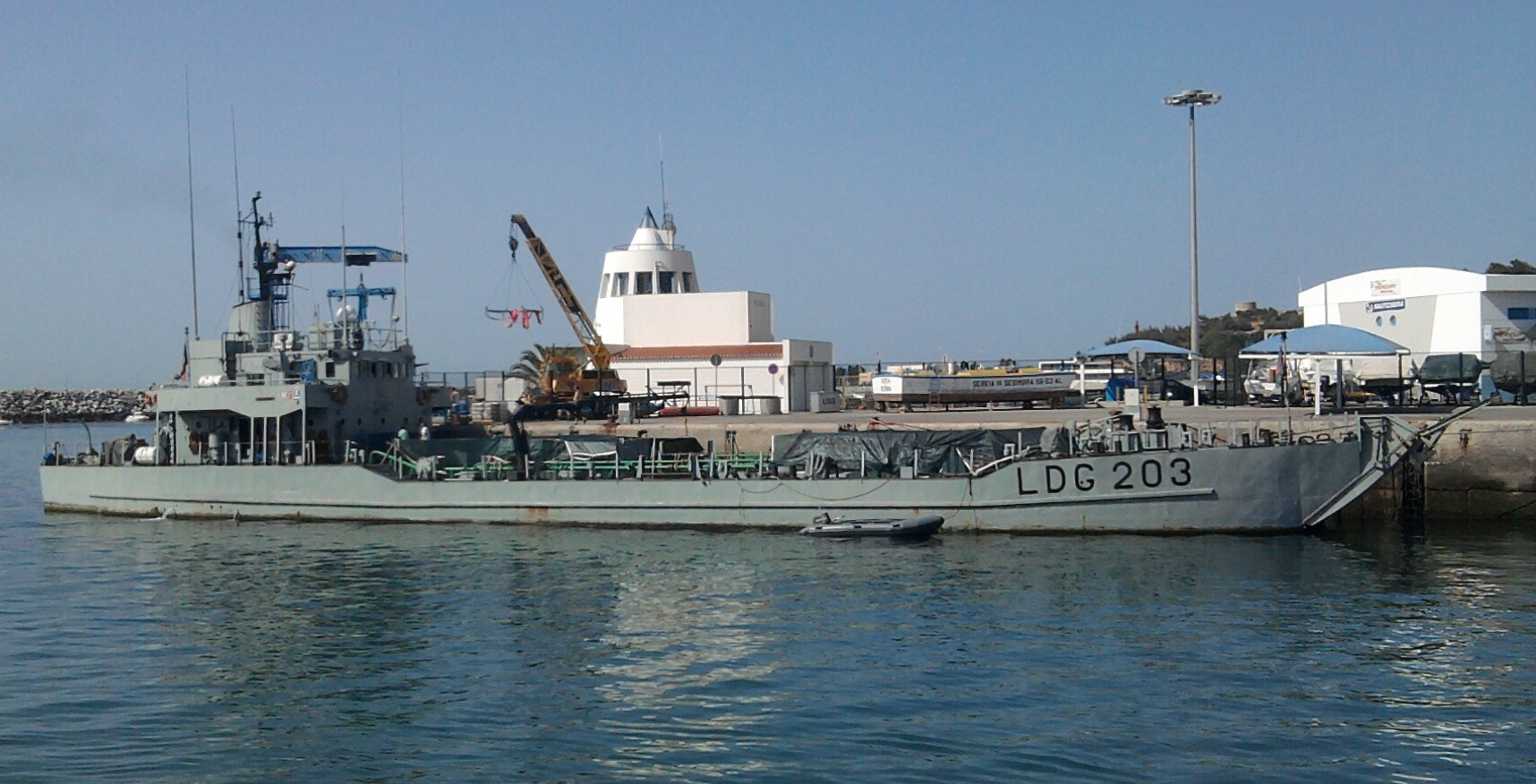
Bombarda landing craft-class
