= NRP Vouga =

NRP Vouga is the name of the following ships of the Portuguese Navy:

- NRP Vouga (1841), a schooner
- NRP Vouga (1920), a Guadiana-class destroyer, accidentally sank in 1931
- NRP Vouga (D334), a Douro-class destroyer commissioned in 1933, stricken in the 1960s

== See also ==
- Vouga (disambiguation)
