= Escola Naval =

Escola Naval (Portuguese for "Naval School") may refer to:

- Brazilian Naval School, the naval academy of Brazil
- Portuguese Naval School, the naval academy of Portugal
