= Military Battery of Espalamaca =

- Bateria da Ponta da Espalamaca
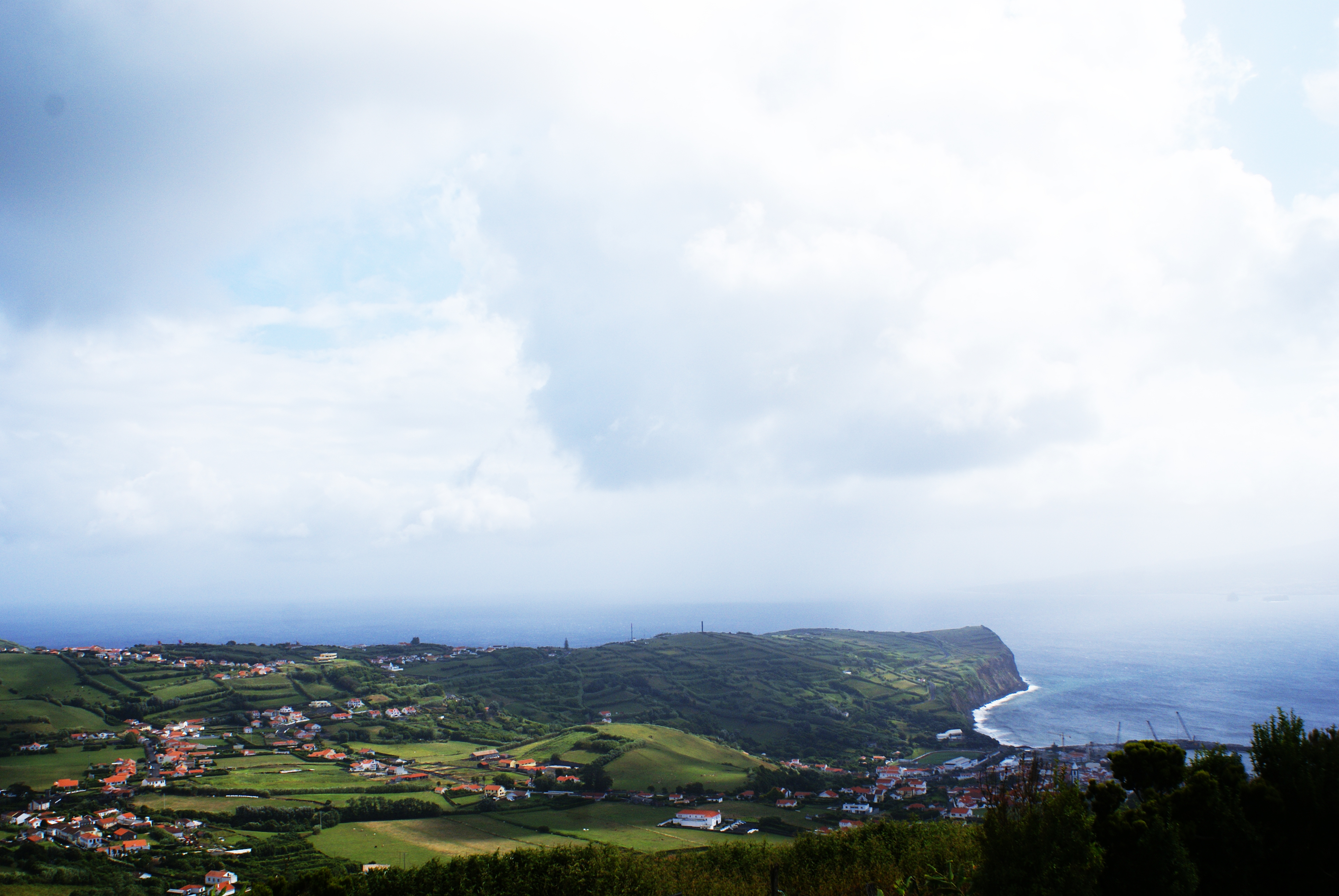
- A view of Ponta da Espalamaca, as seen from Monte Carneiro.

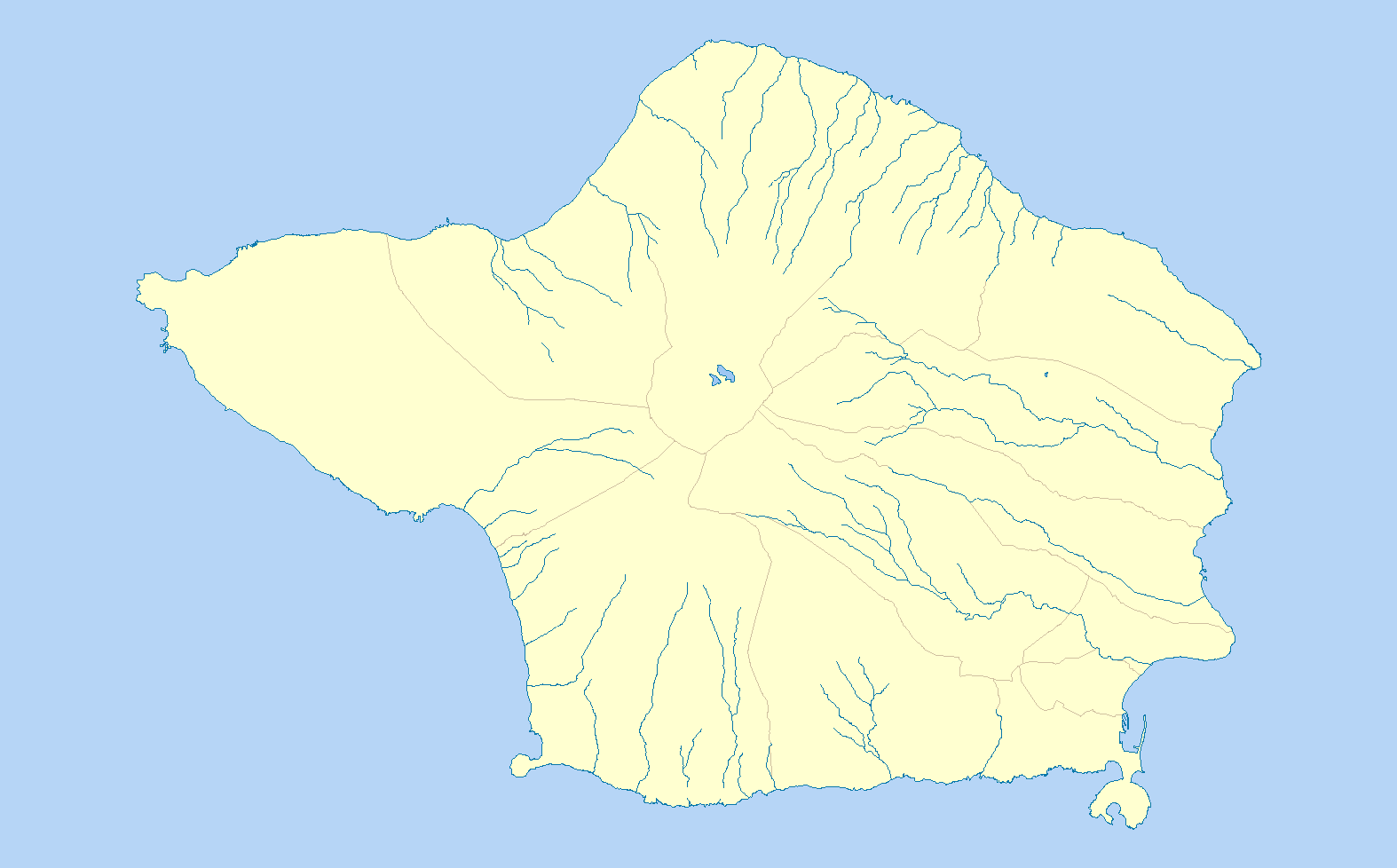
- Location within Faial

General information
- Type: Military Battery
- Architectural style: Nationalist
- Location: Conceição, Portugal
- Coordinates: 38.55°N 28.61°W
- Completed: 1941; 85 years ago
- Opened: 20th century

Technical details
- Material: Reinforced concrete

The Military Battery of Espalamaca (Portuguese: Bateria de Costa da Ponta da Espalamaca), also known as the Position of Espalamaca (Portuguese: Posição da Espalamaca) or the Fort of Espalamaca (Portuguese: Forte da Espalamaca), is located over the promontory of Espalamaca, civil parish of Conceição, municipality of Horta, in the Portuguese archipelago of the Azores.

== History ==
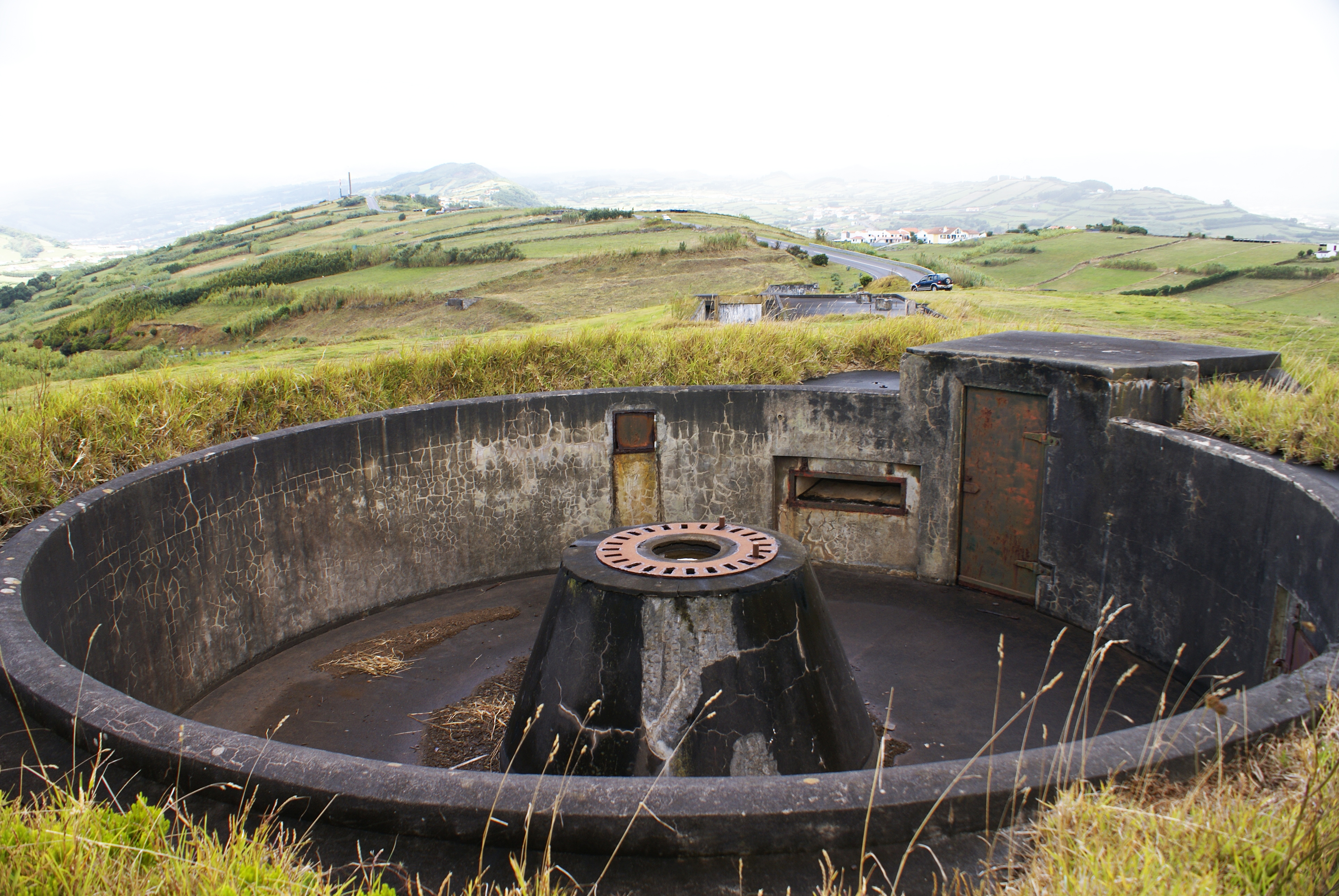
One of the military emplacements along the Espalamaca

The fortifications were constructed in 1941, during the Second World War, in order to defend the port of Horta and the channel between Faial and Pico, anchorage for ships and transiting Allied forces. It was built in order to work in conjunction with the artillery batteries of Monte da Guia and anti-aircraft battery at Monte Carneiro.

Along with the battery at Monte da Guia, the posts were garrisoned by members of the Bateria Independente de Defesa da Costa (BIDC3), each with their own sub-alternate officials, six sergeants or militia, and 20 soldiers. The site was equipped with military equipment extracted from the old ironclad Vasco da Gama, which was dismantled in 1936.

The military post was decommissioned in 1970.

In 2002, along with the Fort of Guia, the emplacement was included in the list of patrimony that was put up for sale, during the term of Manuela Ferreira Leite at the Ministry of Finances. Against this, the Minister of the Republic (for the Azores), Alberto Sampaio da Nóvoa, declared to the press his intention to (along with the Ministries of Defense and Finances) make sure the military installations did not become private property. The initial public offering at the time was 110,000 Euros (while the Fort of Guia was offered at 25,000 Euros). For Nóvoa (who considered both emplacements in good condition), the sites were of an important patrimonial nature and its use should have been negotiated between the State, regional government and municipal authority (to provide an adequate use). He argued that the emplacement should be transformed into a military museum, a suggestion that was manifested by the old Minister of Defense Júlio Castro Caldas (who served under António Guterres), when he visited Faial in 2000. The municipal council was also interested in acquiring the space, but thought that the initial base of 110,000 Euros was excessive.

With no project in development, the lands became abandoned and installations fell into ruin. The land was eventually made available to the public under the military laws for infrastructural use (Lei de Programação de Infra-Estruturas Militares), on 11 July 2008.

== Architecture ==
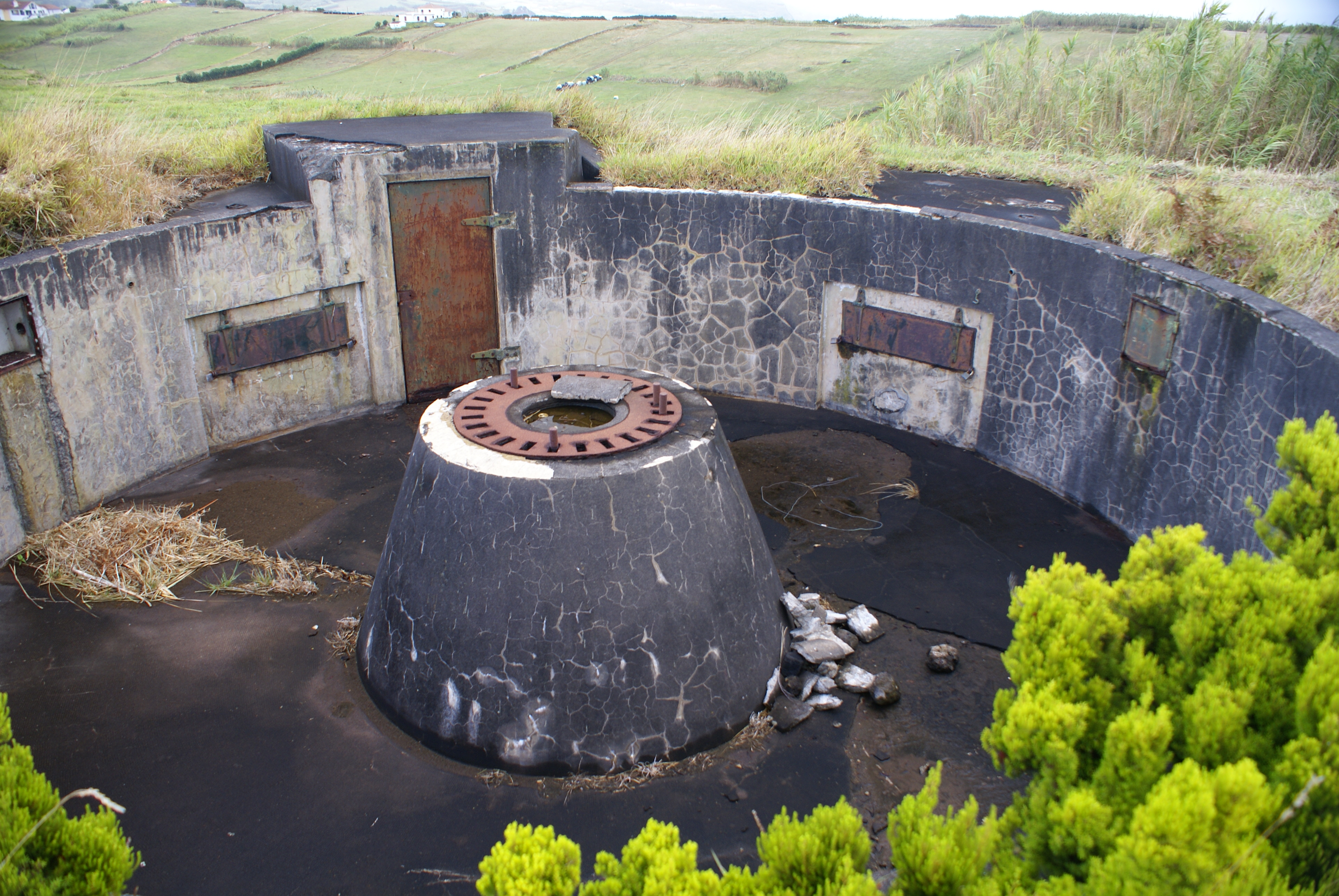
A detail of the mount for the military gun (removed from the location)

The military battery is the location of two military emplacements, and includes a subterranean complex of infrastructures, in addition to a refectory, electricity room and a guardhouse, near the entranceway (the latter areas exposed). The spaces were constructed in reinforced concrete, integrating the two gun emplacements, a firing command post (PCT), two observation posts (PO), and six bunkers (four large and two small). Further, these spaces were linked by corridors and included lodgings, washrooms and a cistern for the garrison situated on the site.
