= MV Aba =

History
- Name: Glenapp (1918–21); Aba (1921–47); Matrona (1947–48)
- Owner: Glen Line (1918–21); Elder Dempster Line (1921–39); Admiralty (1939–47); Elder Dempster Line (1947); Bawtry Steamship Co. Ltd (1947–48)
- Operator: Glen Line (1918–21); Elder Dempster Line (1921–47); John Livanos & Sons Ltd (1947–48)
- Port of registry: (United Kingdom of Great Britain and Ireland) Glasgow, United Kingdom (1918–21); (United Kingdom of Great Britain and Ireland) Liverpool, United Kingdom (1921–23); Liverpool, United Kingdom (1923–39); (United Kingdom) Liverpool (1939–47); (United Kingdom) Liverpool (1947); (United Kingdom) London (1947–48)
- Builder: Barclay, Curle & Co Ltd.
- Yard number: 519
- Launched: 16 March 1918
- Completed: September 1918
- Out of service: 31 October 1947
- Identification: United Kingdom Official Number 141887; Code Letters JVHL (1918–30); Code Letters GDSW (1930–48)
- Fate: Scrapped

General characteristics
- Type: Troopship (World War I); Passenger ship; Hospital ship (World War II); Troopship (World War II)
- Tonnage: 7,374 GRT (1918–21), 7,937 GRT (1921–48); 4,623 NRT (1918–21), 4,596 NRT (1921–48)
- Length: 450.5 feet (137.31 m)
- Beam: 55.8 feet (17.01 m)
- Draught: 30.4 feet (9.27 m) (1918–21), 24.2 feet (7.38 m) (1921–48)
- Depth: 36.5 feet (11.13 m)
- Installed power: 2 x diesel engines, 4,800bhp, 6,600ihp
- Propulsion: Twin screw propellers
- Speed: 14 knots (26 km/h)

Aba was an early passenger motor vessel. Ordered by the Imperial Russian Government, construction was halted due to the Revolution. She was purchased by Glen Line in 1920. Sold to Elder, Dempster in 1923 and rebuilt. She was requisitioned as a hospital ship in 1939, returning to Elder Dempster in 1947. Sold to the Bawtry Steamship Co. that year, she capsized whilst under refit. Deemed a constructive total loss, she was scrapped in 1948.

== Description ==
As built, she was 450.5 feet (137.31 m) long, with a beam of 55.8 feet (17.01 m). She had a depth of 36.5 feet (11.13 m) and a draught of 30.4 feet (9.27 m). She was powered by two four-stroke diesel engines, each having 8 cylinders of 750 millimetres (30 in) diameter and 1,100 millimetres (43 in) stroke. They drove twin screw propellers, giving her a speed of 14 knots (26 km/h). The engines were designed by Burmeister & Wain and built by Harland & Wolff, Belfast, County Antrim, United Kingdom. They were rated at a total of 4,800brake horsepower, 6,600ihp, at 120rpm. Fuel oil capacity was 750 tons, sufficient for a voyage from Great Britain to the United States and return. She was assesed at 7,374 GRT, 4,623 NRT

== History ==
The ship was ordered by the Imperial Russian Government, but work was halted due to the outbreak of the Revolution in February 1917. She was built as yard number 519 by Barclay, Curle & Co. Ltd, Glasgow, Renfrewshire, United Kingdom. She was bought by the Glen Line in 1918 and work resumed. She was launched as Glenapp on 16 March 1918 and completed in September. Her port of registry was Glasgow and the United Kingdom Official Number 141887 was allocated, as were the Code Letters JVHL. She was initially used as a troopship, bringing American soldiers to serve in France.

Elder Dempster Shipping Ltd had lost a number of ships during World War I, and needed two passenger ships to bring its fleet up to strength. Glenapp was purchased from Glen Line in 1920 and renamed Aba. She was rebuilt by Harland & Wolff. Following the rebuild, she had capacity for 220 first class, 105 second class and 35 third class passengers. Her draught had been reduced to 24.2 feet (7.38 m). She was now assessed at 7,937 GRT, 4,596 NRT. Her port of registry was changed to Liverpool, Lancashire. Following the rebuild, she undertook trials on 16 August 1921. Aba was world's first motor passenger liner in regular use on an ocean route. A celebratory dinner was held on board at Liverpool on 14 November. She made her maiden voyage for Elder Dempster on 16 November, sailing from Liverpool for West Africa.

In August 1922, Aba received a distress signal from the Portuguese destroyer NRP Guadiana, which had suffered an engine failure. She towed the destroyer 422 nautical miles (782 km) to Las Palmas, Canary Islands; the weather preventing the crew from taking to the lifeboats. They arrived at Las Palmas on 30 August. In 1934, her Code Letters were changed to GDSW. Aba and Adda, a passenger motor vessel built for Elder Dempster in 1922 were deemed a success. In 1926, Elder Dempster placed an order for two more motor passenger vessels, the Accra and Apapa. On 21 January 1926, Aba suffered a broken crankshaft in one of her engines when she was 280 nautical miles (520 km) off Las Palmas. She continued her voyage on one engine at a speed of 8 to 9 knots (15 to 17 km/h). The German tug Seefalke was dispatched to assist. Aba was taken under tow, and arrived at Liverpool on 26 January. On 7 December 1929, her steering gear became disabled when she was 70 nautical miles (130 km) west of Ouessant, Finistère, France whilst bound for West Africa. The German tugs Atlas and Max Berendt were sent to her assistance. Apapa took off her passengers. By 10 December, she was making for Queenstown, County Cork, Ireland at 6 knots (11 km/h). She was towed in to Queenstown by the Dutch tug Zwarte Zee on 13 December. Following repairs, she was scheduled to resume her voyage on 18 December.

In March 1937, the Spanish ship Mar Cantabrico was attacked in the Bay of Biscay by the Spanish cruiser Canarias. She was alleged to be carrying war materials including eight aircraft and 32 field kitchens. Aba relayed her distress signal. Confusion about the identity of the ship under attack arose, and it was thought that the casualty was Elder Dempster's Adda. HMS Echo was one of four Royal Navy destroyers sent to her aid. Canarias rescued the crew of Mar Cantabrico, which sank. In May 1937, Aba brough the Alake of Abeokuta to the United Kingdom from Nigeria. He was to attend the Coronation of King George VI. Aba was requisitioned by the Admiralty in September 1939 for use as a hospital ship. She sustained slight damage in February 1941 when she was bombed off Tobruk, Libya; and again in April in Suda Bay, Crete. She was machine gunned on 16 May at Canea, Greece and then bombed twice the next day whilst en route to Haifa, Israel. Eight Junkers Ju-87 dive bombers had attacked and there were many near misses. HMS Coventry was one of the ships which went to the aid of Aba. Her director layer, Alfred Sephton was awarded a posthumous Victoria Cross for his actions in repelling the attack. Aba was severely damaged in April 1944 during an air raid on Naples, Italy. Following repairs, she was used as a troopship.

Aba was returned to her owners on 7 January 1947. She was laid up at Birkenhead, Cheshire. On 28 April, she was sold to Bawtry Steamship Co., who renamed her Matrona and placed her under the management of J. Livanos. Her port of registry was changed to London. Matrona capsized at Birkenhead on 30 October 1947 whilst being refitted as a cargo liner. All on board survived. She was righted on 8 June 1948. Declared a constructive total loss, she arrived at Barrow-in-Furness, Lancashire on 4 October 1948 for scrapping by T. W. Ward Ltd.
