= NRP Guadiana =

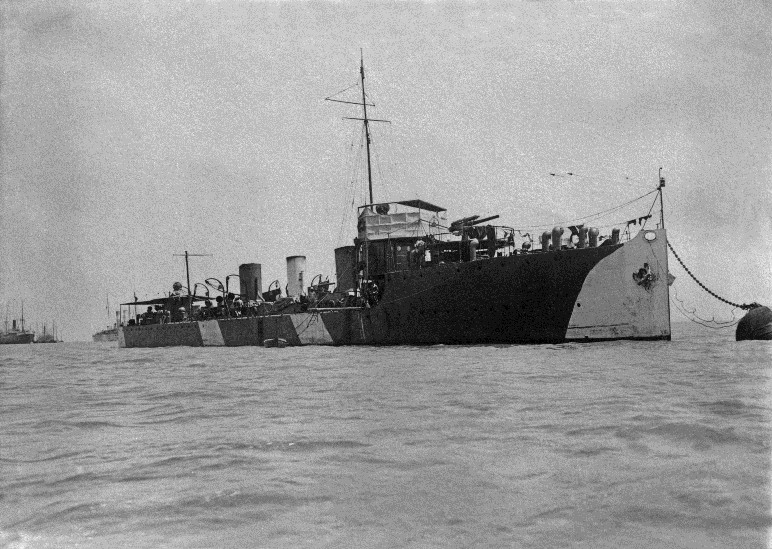

History

Portugal
- Name: Guadiana
- Builder: Lisbon Naval Base
- Laid down: 22 February 1913
- Launched: 21 September 1914
- Fate: Broken up, 1934

General characteristics
- Class & type: Guadiana-class destroyer
- Displacement: Standard: 515 long tons (523 t); Full load: 660 long tons (670 t)
- Length: 73.2 m (240 ft 2 in)
- Beam: 7.2 m (23 ft 7 in)
- Draft: 2.3 m (7 ft 7 in)
- Installed power: 3 × Yarrow boilers; 11,000 shp (8,200 kW)
- Propulsion: 2 × steam turbines; 2 × screw propellers
- Speed: 27 knots (50 km/h; 31 mph)
- Range: 1,600 nautical miles (3,000 km; 1,800 mi) at 15 knots (28 km/h; 17 mph)
- Complement: 80
- Armament: 1 × 102 mm (4 in) gun; 2 × 76 mm (3 in) guns; 4 × 457 mm (18 in) torpedo tubes

NRP Guadiana was the lead ship of the Guadiana class of destroyers built for the Portuguese Navy in the 1910s.

== Design ==
The Portuguese Navy had struggled to secure funding for new ships after the 1890s, when a number of protected cruisers and smaller craft had been built. The navy nevertheless made repeated attempts for ambitious construction programs. After the toppling of the Portuguese monarchy in 1910, the navy submitted another large construction plan in 1912, which the new republican government passed (and then reduced in scope in 1913). The revised plan called for two new cruisers, six destroyers, and three submarines; the Guadiana class of four destroyers comprised a significant part of the program. The design for the new ships was prepared by Yarrow Shipbuilders.

The ships of the Guadiana class were 73.2 m (240 ft 2 in) long, with a beam of 7.2 m (23 ft 7 in) and a draft of 2.3 m (7 ft 7 in). They displaced 515 long tons (523 t) standard and up to 660 long tons (670 t) at full load. They had a crew of 80 officers and enlisted men. The ships were powered by two Parsons steam turbines, with steam provided by three Yarrow water-tube boilers that were vented through individual funnels. The engines were rated to produce 11,000 shaft horsepower (8,200 kW) for a top speed of 27 knots (50 km/h; 31 mph). At a more economical speed of 15 knots (28 km/h; 17 mph), the ships could cruise for 1,600 nautical miles (3,000 km; 1,800 mi).

The ship carried an armament that consisted of a single 102 mm (4 in) gun and two 76 mm (3 in) guns, along with four 457 mm (18 in) torpedo tubes. The 102 mm gun was placed on the forecastle and the 76 mm guns were mounted on the centerline further aft, one between the first and second funnel and the other gun further aft. The torpedo tubes were in twin mounts, also on the centerline, one aft of the third funnel and the other at the stern.

== Service history ==
The keel for Guadiana was laid down on 22 February 1913. She was built at the Lisbon Naval Base and was launched on 21 September 1914.

The Portuguese Navy played a major role in domestic politics in the early 20th century. The Portuguese Army launched a coup against the government in December 1917, and the navy retaliated on 8 January 1918 to restore the republican government. Guadiana, her sister ship Douro, and the elderly ironclad warship Vasco da Gama anchored in Lisbon, where army field artillery took the ships under fire. Vasco da Gama traded shots with the artillery, but after about twenty-five minutes of shooting, abandoned the effort and flew a white flag, prompting Douro and Guadiana to do the same. After coming under rifle fire from soldiers ashore, the men from Guadiana and Douro abandoned ship and took shelter behind the American patrol boat Corsair, which was anchored in the harbor at that time. None of the ships were damaged in the incident.

On 27 August 1922, the ship broke down and had to be towed back to port by the passenger ship Aba, and she arrived in Las Palmas three days later. Aba towed Guadiana a total of 422 nautical miles (782 km; 486 mi) through stormy weather that prevented evacuating the crew with lifeboats. The crew of Guadiana later sent an award to the Aba's captain for coming to their assistance.

The ship was eventually discarded in 1934.
