= Guadiana-class destroyer =

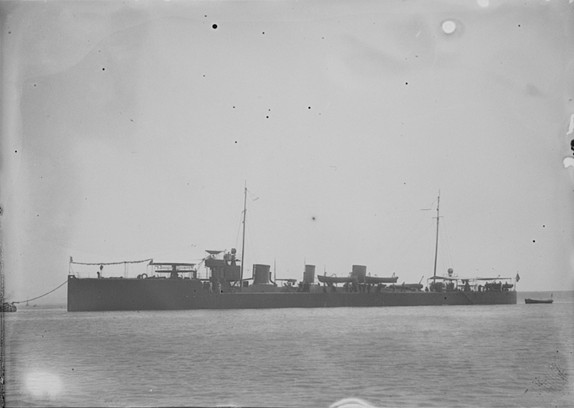
- Douro

Class overview
- Name: Guadiana-class destroyer
- Builders: Lisbon Naval Arsenal
- Operators: Portuguese Navy
- Preceded by: Tejo
- Succeeded by: Douro class
- In commission: 1913–1942
- Completed: 4
- Lost: 1
- Retired: 3

General characteristics
- Type: Destroyer
- Displacement: Standard: 515 long tons (523 t); Full load: 660 long tons (670 t)
- Length: 73.2 m (240 ft 2 in)
- Beam: 7.2 m (23 ft 7 in)
- Draft: 2.3 m (7 ft 7 in)
- Installed power: 3 × Yarrow boilers; 11,000 shp (8,200 kW)
- Propulsion: 2 × steam turbines; 2 × screw propellers
- Speed: 27 knots (50 km/h; 31 mph)
- Range: 1,600 nautical miles (3,000 km; 1,800 mi) at 15 knots (28 km/h; 17 mph)
- Complement: 80
- Armament: 1 × 102 mm (4 in) gun; 2 × 76 mm (3 in) guns; 4 × 457 mm (18 in) torpedo tubes

The Guadiana class was a class of four destroyers employed by the Portuguese Navy (Marinha Portuguesa) between 1913 and 1942. This class is often alternatively referred as the Douro class.

In Portugal, a later class of destroyers, the Douro class, was used by the Portuguese Navy between 1933 and 1967; it is usually referred to as the Vouga class.

== Design ==
The Portuguese Navy had struggled to secure funding for new ships after the 1890s, when a number of protected cruisers and smaller craft had been built. The navy nevertheless made repeated attempts for ambitious construction programs. After the toppling of the Portuguese monarchy in 1910, the navy submitted another large construction plan in 1912, which the new republican government passed (and then reduced in scope in 1913). The revised plan called for two new cruisers, six destroyers, and three submarines; the Guadiana class of four destroyers comprised a significant part of the program.

The design for the new ships was prepared by Yarrow Shipbuilders, and it was very similar to the Pará-class destroyers that Yarrow had recently built for the Brazilian Navy. The chief difference was the substitution of steam turbines for older triple-expansion steam engines. The Yarrow designers considered the use of mixed coal and fuel oil firing for the ships' boilers, but decided against it owing to the uncertain availability of oil at the time and coal was readily available.

=== Characteristics ===
The ships of the Guadiana class were 73.2 m (240 ft 2 in) long, with a beam of 7.2 m (23 ft 7 in) and a draft of 2.3 m (7 ft 7 in). They displaced 515 long tons (523 t) standard and up to 660 long tons (670 t) at full load. The superstructure consisted of a small conning tower forward and a smaller, secondary conning position further aft. Each ship carried a single pole mast directly aft of the main conning tower. The ships had straight stem and a short forecastle deck that terminated forward of the conning tower. According to Conway's All the World's Fighting Ships, each vessel had a crew of 80 officers and enlisted men, but the contemporary Journal of the American Society of Naval Engineers provides a total complement of 72, 5 of whom were officers.

The ships were powered by two Parsons steam turbines driving three screw propellers, with a high-pressure turbine on the center shaft and two lower pressure turbines, along with reverse turbines on the outer shafts. Steam was provided by three Yarrow water-tube boilers that were vented through individual funnels. The engines were rated to produce 11,000 shaft horsepower (8,200 kW) for a top speed of 27 knots (50 km/h; 31 mph). At a more economical speed of 15 knots (28 km/h; 17 mph), the ships could cruise for 1,600 nautical miles (3,000 km; 1,800 mi). The ships had a coal storage capacity of 146 long tons (148 t).

The ships carried an armament that consisted of a single 102 mm (4 in) gun and two 76 mm (3 in) guns, along with four 457 mm (18 in) torpedo tubes. The 102 mm gun was placed on the forecastle and the 76 mm guns were mounted on the centerline further aft, one between the first and second funnel and the other gun further aft. All three guns were placed on elevated platforms to give them better fields of fire. The torpedo tubes were in twin mounts, also on the centerline, one aft of the third funnel and the other at the stern. The guns were supplied by the Elswick Ordnance Company in the UK.

== Ships ==
Ship name	Hull code	Builder	Commissioned	Fate
Douro	D	Lisbon Shipyard	6 June 1913	Discarded 23 June 1927
Tâmega	T	Lisbon Shipyard	19 August 1924	Discarded 2 September 1942
Guadiana	G	Lisbon Shipyard	10 May 1915	Discarded 4 January 1936
Vouga	V	Lisbon Shipyard	31 December 1920	Sunk 16 May 1931

== Service history ==
The first two ships of the class, together with NRP Tejo constituted the Portuguese destroyer force during World War I.

NRP Vouga sank in 1931, during the amphibious operation to suppress a military rebellion on the island of Madeira.

From 1933, the ships were replaced by the five destroyers of the Douro class.
