= Alfred Edward Sephton =

Recipient of the Victoria Cross

- Born: 19 April 1911; Warrington, Cheshire
- Died: 19 May 1941 (aged 30); HMS Coventry, Mediterranean Sea
- Burial place: At sea
- Military career
- Allegiance: United Kingdom
- Branch: Royal Navy
- Service years: 1927 - 1941
- Rank: Petty Officer
- Units: HMS Coventry
- Conflicts: World War II: Battle of Greece; Battle of Crete; Strafing of HMS Coventry (DOW)
- Awards: Victoria Cross

Alfred Edward Sephton VC (19 April 1911 – 19 May 1941) was an English recipient of the Victoria Cross, the highest and most prestigious award for gallantry in the face of the enemy that can be awarded to British and Commonwealth forces.

== Details ==
He was 30 years old, and a petty officer in the Royal Navy during the Second World War when the following deed took place for which he was awarded the VC.

On 18 May 1941 in the Mediterranean, south of Crete, Petty Officer Sephton was a director layer on HMS Coventry when she went to the assistance of the hospital ship HMHS Aba which was being attacked by German dive-bombers. When the enemy engaged Coventry, strafing her with machine-gun fire, Petty Officer Sephton was mortally wounded, a bullet actually passing through his body and injuring an able seaman beside him. Although in great pain and partially blinded, nevertheless he stuck to his instruments and carried out his duties until the attack was over. He died of his injuries next day.

== The medal ==
Sephton's Victoria Cross was stolen from Coventry Cathedral in 1990.
