= Conceição (Horta) =

- Civil parish
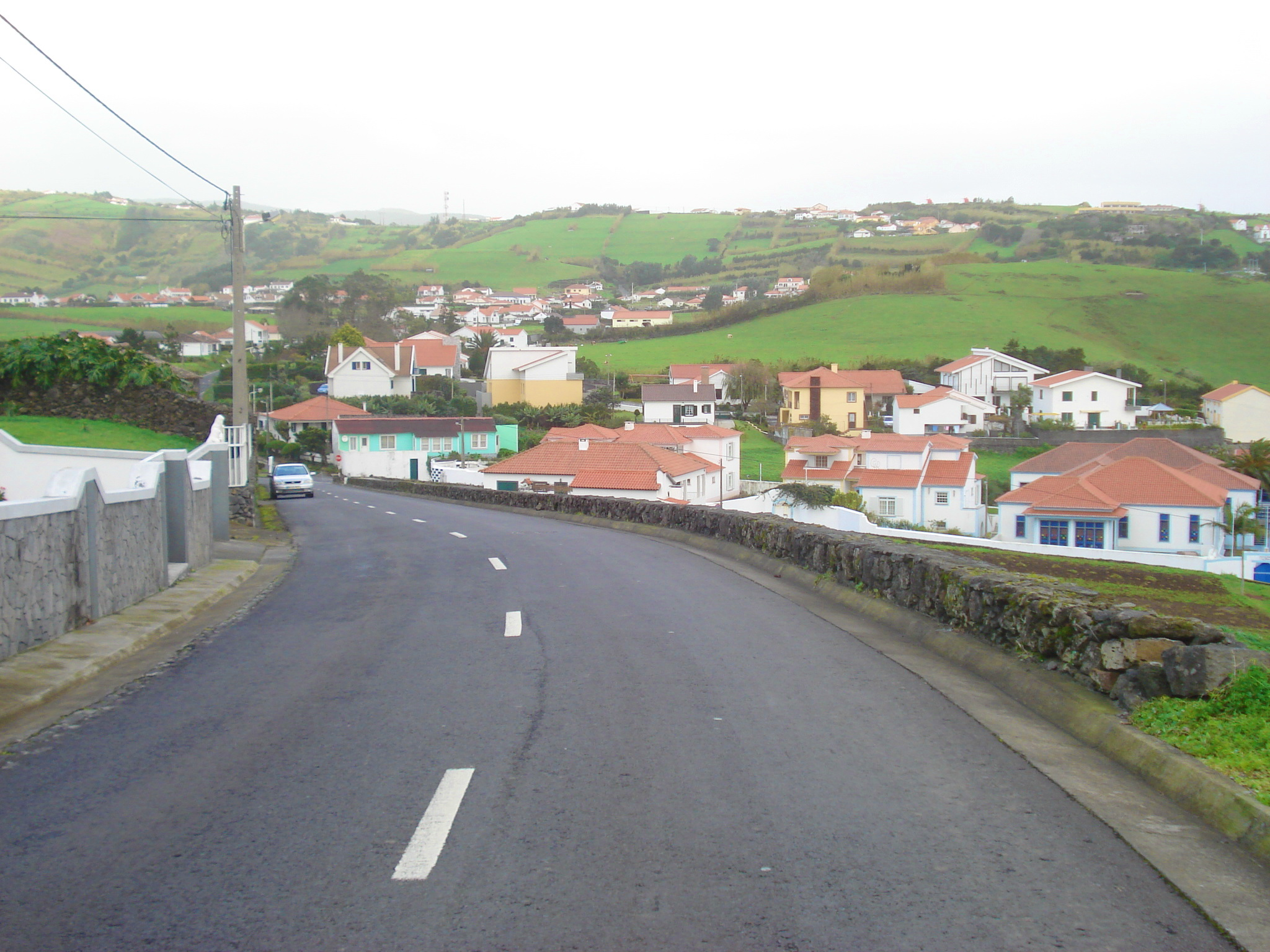
- The locality of Volta looking towards the central part of Espalamaca, in the main part of Conceição

- Location of the civil parish of Conceição in the municipality of Horta
- Coordinates: 38°32′53″N 28°37′46″W
- Country: Portugal
- Auton. region: Azores
- Island: Faial
- Municipality: Horta

Area
  - Total: 3.08 km^{2} (1.19 sq mi)
- Elevation: 104 m (341 ft)

Population (2011)
  - Total: 1,138
  - Density: 369/km^{2} (957/sq mi)
- Time zone: UTC−01:00 (AZOT)
  - Summer (DST): UTC+00:00 (AZOST)
- Postal code: 9900-081
- Area code: 292
- Patron: Nossa Senhora da Conceição
- Website: http://jf-conceicao.com

Conceição (pronounced [kõ.sɨ.ˈsɐ̃w]) is a freguesia ("civil parish") in the municipality of Horta in the Portuguese Azores. The population in 2011 was 1,138, in an area of 3.08 km². It is the second smallest parish within the administration of Horta.

== History ==
The settlement of the area that became known as Nossa Senhora da Conceição was first attributed to the Flemish nobleman Joss van Aard (which was later transliterated into Portuguese as José da Terra, literally Joseph of the Earth/Land), where he made his home, cultivated a small parcel, and planted fruit trees on the edge of Ribeira dos Flamengos (Ravine of the Flemings):

"...who settle along a ravine, today named Ribeira da Conceição, in virtue of the chapel to this invocation that he constructed..."

Along his holdings was a large promontory that overlooked the Bay of Horta, and extended into the Canal that the Flemish colonists referred to as The Needle (Dutch: Spelk Maker), later to be known in Portuguese as Espalamaca.

In 1498, Joss de Utra (the second Captain-donatário of Faial), established his administrative center for the village in the deeper part of the Conceição, thus attracting a settlement wave. A decade after this migration, King Sebastian (30 July 1568) referred to several new communities in the eastern coast of Faial: São Salvador (Matriz), with about 100 to 200 homes; Feteira, Castelo Branco, Praia do Norte, Praia do Almoxarife and Flamengos, with less than 100. In this document, the parish of Nossa Senhora da Conceição was established. Later, friar Diogo das Chagas, a noted historian, in his book Espelho Cristalino referred to this parish having 594 inhabitants scattered in 161 buildings.

D'Utra, would establish his administration at Rua do Bom Jesus No.16 in Conceição, to house his executive, administration and local jail (referred locally as the Casa da Câmara e Cadeia), literally the House of the Council and Jail. By 5 November 1632, Fernão Gomes Massam, then Corregador dos Açores, reported that the building became incapacitated and its roles were transferred to other buildings within the municipality.

Fortifications were constructed in the lower part of the parish during the 17th Century, including the Fort of Alagoa (July 1621) and later the Fort of Bom Jesus (1821), in order to help protect and defend Horta from pirates and privateers that harassed and sacked the communities of the archipelago.

Nossa Senhora da Conceição was actually the second village in the Horta basin, after Matriz do Santíssimo Salvador: the parish of Nossa Senhora das Angústias established only in 1684. The historian Gaspar Frutuoso, noted that the Igreja de Nossa Senhora da Conceição (Church of Our Lady of the Conception) was constructed with three naves, and five columns on each side, and chapel located on its eastern quarter. In 1589, it was sacked by English privateers. In October 1597, it was once again pillaged, but then set aflame. Frair Diogo de Chagas noted that it was rebuilt, starting in 1607, becoming the “most perfect that existed before". It was once again remodelled in 1749, under the direction of Father Teodósio Ferreira de Melo.

In 1701, the Hermitage of Pilar (Portuguese: Ermida de Pilar) was built by Father Filipe Furtado de Mendonça, along the edge of the parish (along Espalamaca), where he was eventually buried. In 1729 it was destroyed during a fire. Also, across from the Casais do Farrobo, as noted by Gaspar Frutuoso, a chapel for Santo Amaro (English: Ermida de Santo Amaro) was constructed as promised by Braz Pereira Sarmento.

In 1858 the Forte do Bom Jesus, having been almost completely abandoned except for a canon, was requalified in order to house the new jail.

In 1868, a road was finally opened to the chapel of Santo Amaro in Flamengos. It was in the late part of the 19th century that Manuel Inácio de Souza Sarmento, a rich politician in the municipal council of Horta constructed the Palacete of Pilar alongside the Hermitage of Pilar, which would be centre of society until it was divided between his ancestors a century later. The residence was ransacked by his descendants, sold off and occupied by the family of the Viscount Leite-Perry, losing much of its cultural importance.

The planting of the first submarine cable on Alagoa Beach, initiated the Era das Companhias dos Cabos (Era of the Cable Companies), on 23 August 1893.

The Palacete do Barão da Ribeirinha (Palacette of the Baron of Ribeirinha), the home of Vitoriano da Rosa Martins, then situated in the Largo da Igreja Paroquial, functioned provisionally as the Liceu da Horta (Lyceum of Horta), an educational school for members of the upper-classes.

The 1926 Horta earthquake caused the inhabitants to become displaced or homeless on 31 August. The grand local church did not escape the tremors, and was irreparably destroyed: it was reconstructed in 1933, in a modest Art Deco-style. Similarly, by the end of the 20th century, the Palacete of Pilar, now completely abandoned, caught fire and was engulfed.

For many years, Father Américo's project, the Casa do Gaiato, operated a home for abandoned or orphaned children in Conceição. Inaugurated on 28 September 1969, it helped to transition many children into the society of Horta; for 30 years it provided aid and care to these children, under the tutelage of Father Raul de Jesus.

== Geography ==
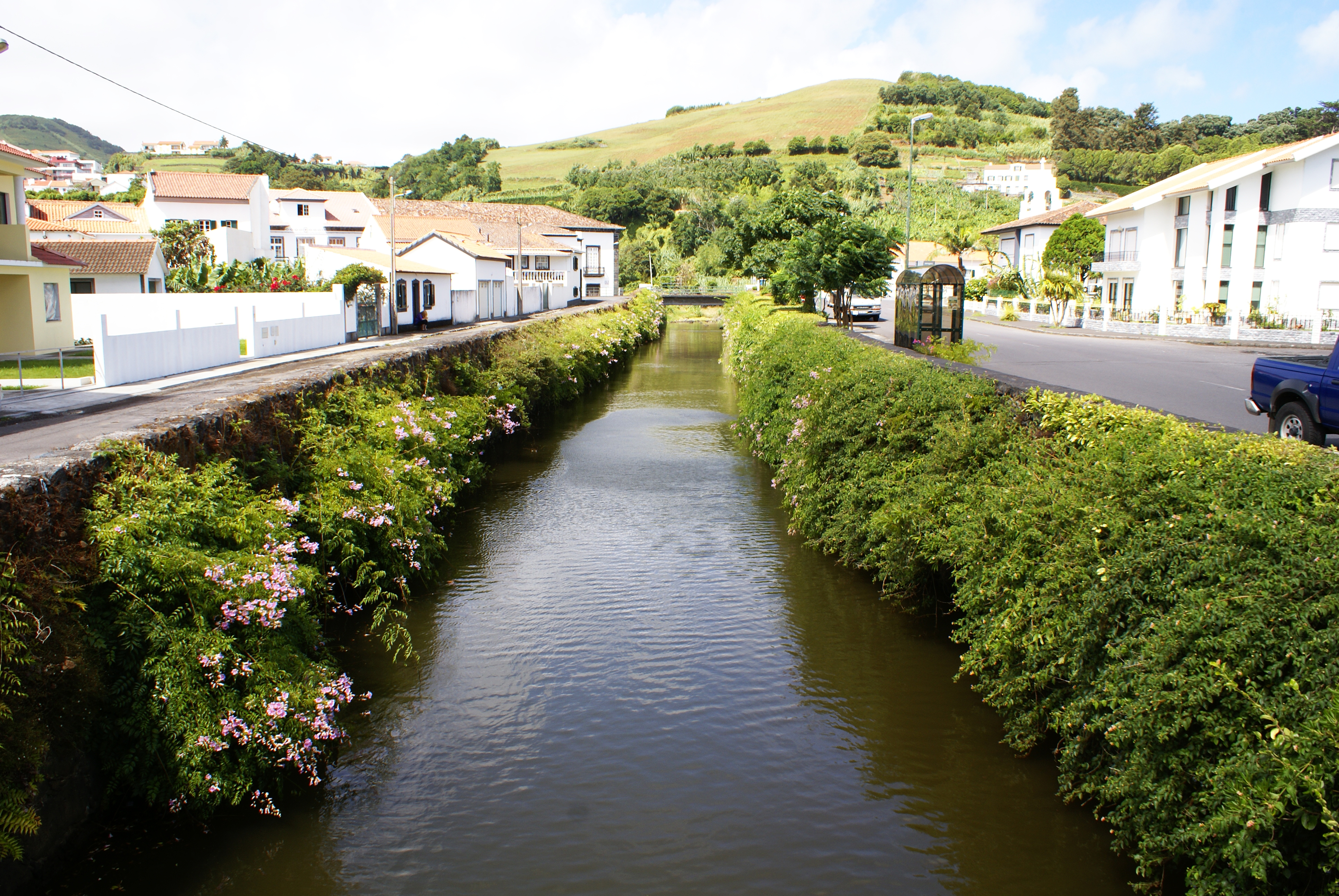
The Ribeira da Conceição dividing the parish from the city of Horta

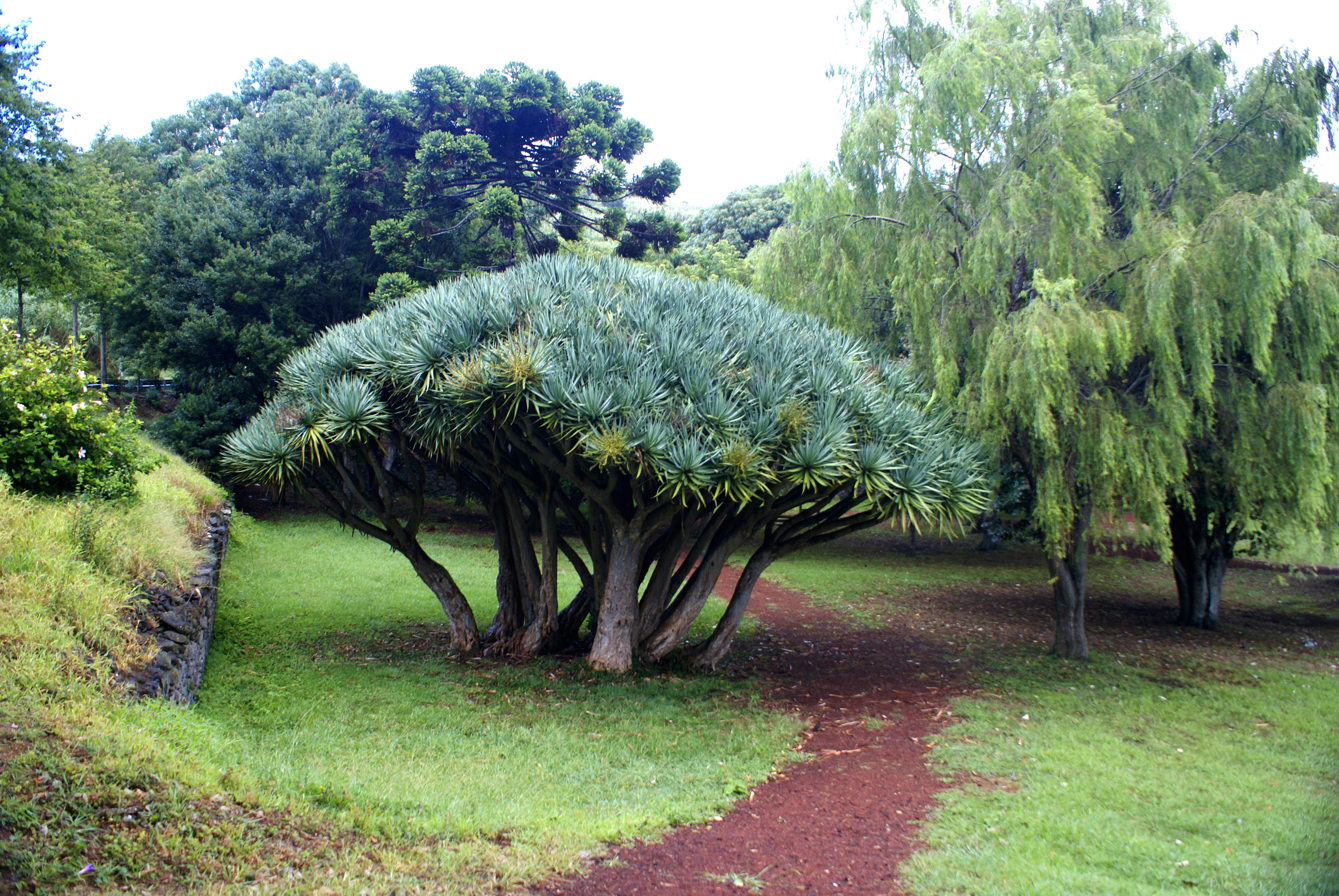
The forest of Vitorino Nemésio Park, showing a Dragueira

Conceição, along with the parishes of Matriz and Angústias, makes up the northern limit of the city of Horta. Topographically it is divided into two parts: an agricultural area, divided by an escarpment that extends from the Sítio of Volta to the western border with Flamengos, and a more urbanized area along the coast and Ribeira da Conceição, which is directly connected to the rest of Horta. The border extends across Espalamaca towards the Caminho Velho (Old Road) before cutting across the eastern extend of the Flamengos valley towards the Quinta do São Lourenço, cutting across a minor volcanic cone, before ending at the base of Monte Carneiro. The southern limit of the parish extends from the Estrada Regional E.R.2-2 towards the centre of the city of Horta, through the locality of Santo Amaro, before winding down the Ribeira da Conceição starting around the middle of the sítio of Volta to the Atlantic Ocean. From the Travessa do Mirante da Conceição, on the southern margin extends towards the municipal courthouse and traffic circle along the Avenida Marginal.

Gaspar Frutuoso, referred to the ravine in these terms: "...in days of strong showers, the water [sic] strength and quantity of water overflow, difficulting [sic] the crossing [of] the center of the village". Even Frutuoso knew of the importance of this river, as he elaborated that the waters were used for mills along the waters edge, and requiring the bridge to cross between the two settlement agglomerations. Once called the Foz da Ribeira, later the Praia da Alagoa or Praia da Conceição (Beach of Conceição), is one of the few natural sand beaches on the island, and along with the Vitorino Nemésio Park (Portuguese: Parque Vitorino Nemésio) is part of a recreational area in the shadow of Espalamaca.

== Economy ==
The main industries in this area are primarily associated with the forest industry (sawmills and carpentry) and civil construction, as well as many commercial businesses located along the coast. In the area of Santo Amaro, the economy is more closely associated with dairy and agriculture.

During the 19th Century, the barrio of Santo Amaro, was known for its bakers that produced bread and pastries for the city of Horta. During the 20th Century the activities were diversified to include many businesses: restaurants, snack-bars, cafes, mini-markets, gymnasiums, clothing shops, designers and publishers, music, stationary stores, furniture shops, jewellery, natural supplement shops, financial services, travel agencies, exporters and spas.

== Architecture ==
=== Civic ===
- Assistance Centre of Horta (Portuguese: Centro de Assistência da Horta)
- District Courthouse of Horta (Portuguese: Tribunal da Comarca da Horta)
- Mansion of the Lacerdas (Portuguese: Solar das Lacerdas)
- National Lyceum of Horta/Manuel de Arriaga Secondary School (Portuguese: Liceu Nacional da Horta/Escola Secondaria Manuel de Arriaga)
- Palacete of Pilar (Portuguese: Palaceto do Pilar), the former-signeurial residence of Manuel Inácio de Souza Sarmento, a rich politician in the municipal council of Horta and property-owner
- Residence Colonel Álvaro Soares de Melo
- Residence Roberto Leal
- Residence Rua da Conceição, 14
- Residence Rua da Conceição, 22
- Residence Rua da Conceição, 23
- Residence Rua Professor Júlio de Andrade
- Windmills on Espalamaca (Portuguese: Moinhos de Vento-Lomba)

=== Military ===
- Military Battery of Espalamaca (Portuguese: Bateria de Costa da Espalamaca), a complex of underground bunks and gun emplacements, constructed during the Second World War to guard the Faial-Pico Channel;

=== Religious ===
- Church of Nossa Senhora da Conceição (Portuguese: Igreja da Nossa Senhora da Conceição)
- Hermitage of Pilar (Portuguese: Ermida do Pilar)
- Hermitage of Santo Amaro (Portuguese: Ermida de Santo Amaro)

== Culture ==
Regionally, Conceição is represented by the Sociedad Filarmónica Artista Faialense (Faialense Artistic Philharmonic Society), the local band (founded on 21 February 1858). The Fayal Sport Clube, an athletics club and regional football team, has been responsible for training many of the island's athletes.

== Notable citizens ==
- António José Vieira Santa Rita (before 1810 - 22 December 1877), the Civil-Governor of the former District of Horta
