= Palacete do Pilar =

Palacete of Pilar
- Palaceto do Pilar
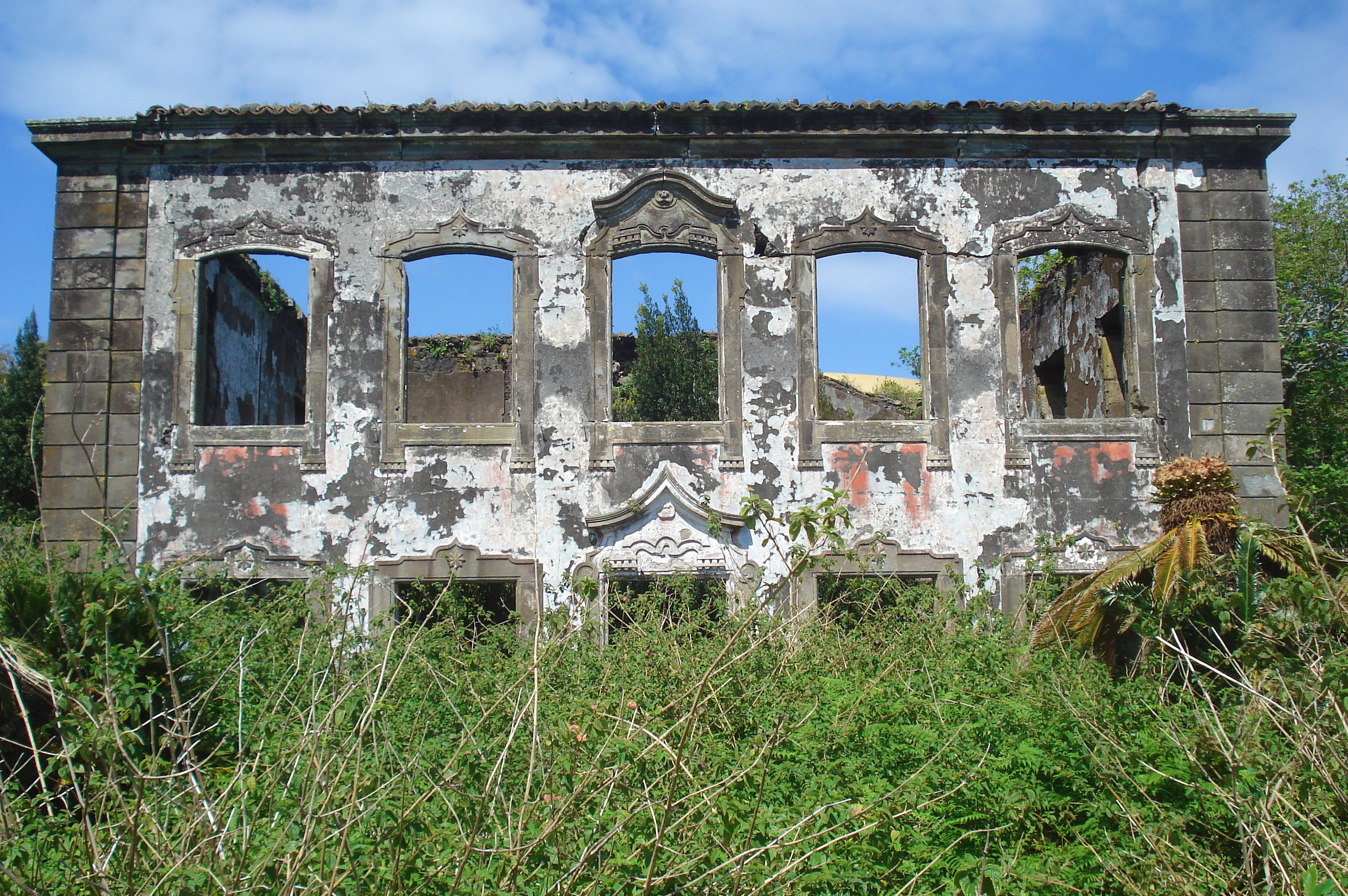
- The front facade of the Palacete of Pilar oriented towards the southeast and the city of Horta
- Interactive map of the Palacete of Pilar area

General information
- Type: Palacete
- Architectural style: Baroque
- Location: Conceição, Portugal
- Coordinates: 38°32′56.07″N 28°37′33.43″W
- Opened: 18th century
- Owner: Portuguese Republic

Technical details
- Material: Stone Masonry

The Residence of Pilar (in portuguese: Palacete do Pilar) is a Baroque-era residence, now in complete ruins, on Lomba do Pilar in the civil parish of Conceição, municipality of Horta, in the Portuguese archipelago of the Azores.

The residence was one of the few formal solares or estate homes located on the island of Faial, that was abandoned, and later destroyed in a fire during the 20th century.

== History ==
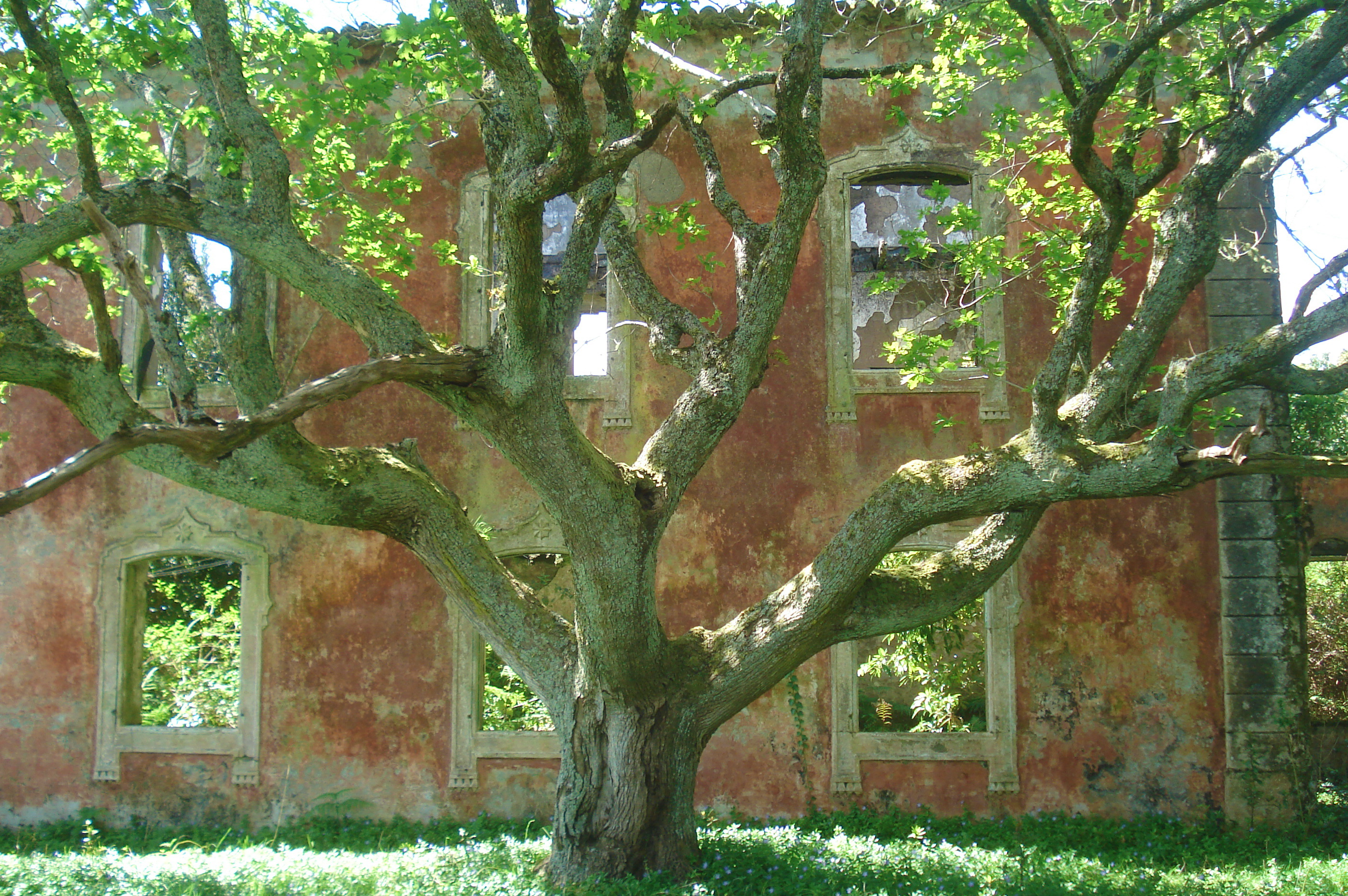
The main courtyard and the surviving maple tree, while the overgrown vegetation covers the rest of the promontory

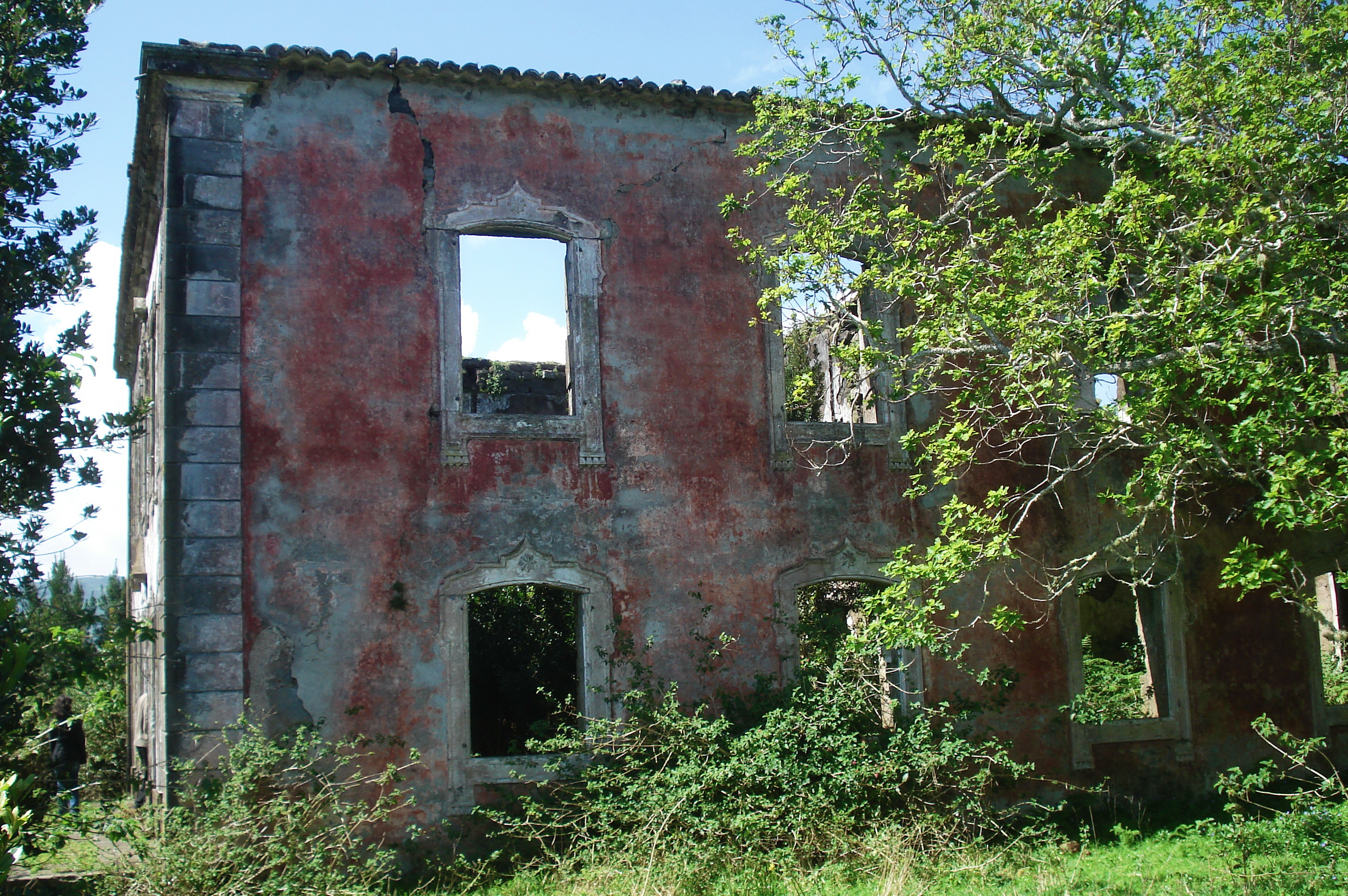
The red-tinged walls of the eastern facade remained after the fire that engulfed the palacete

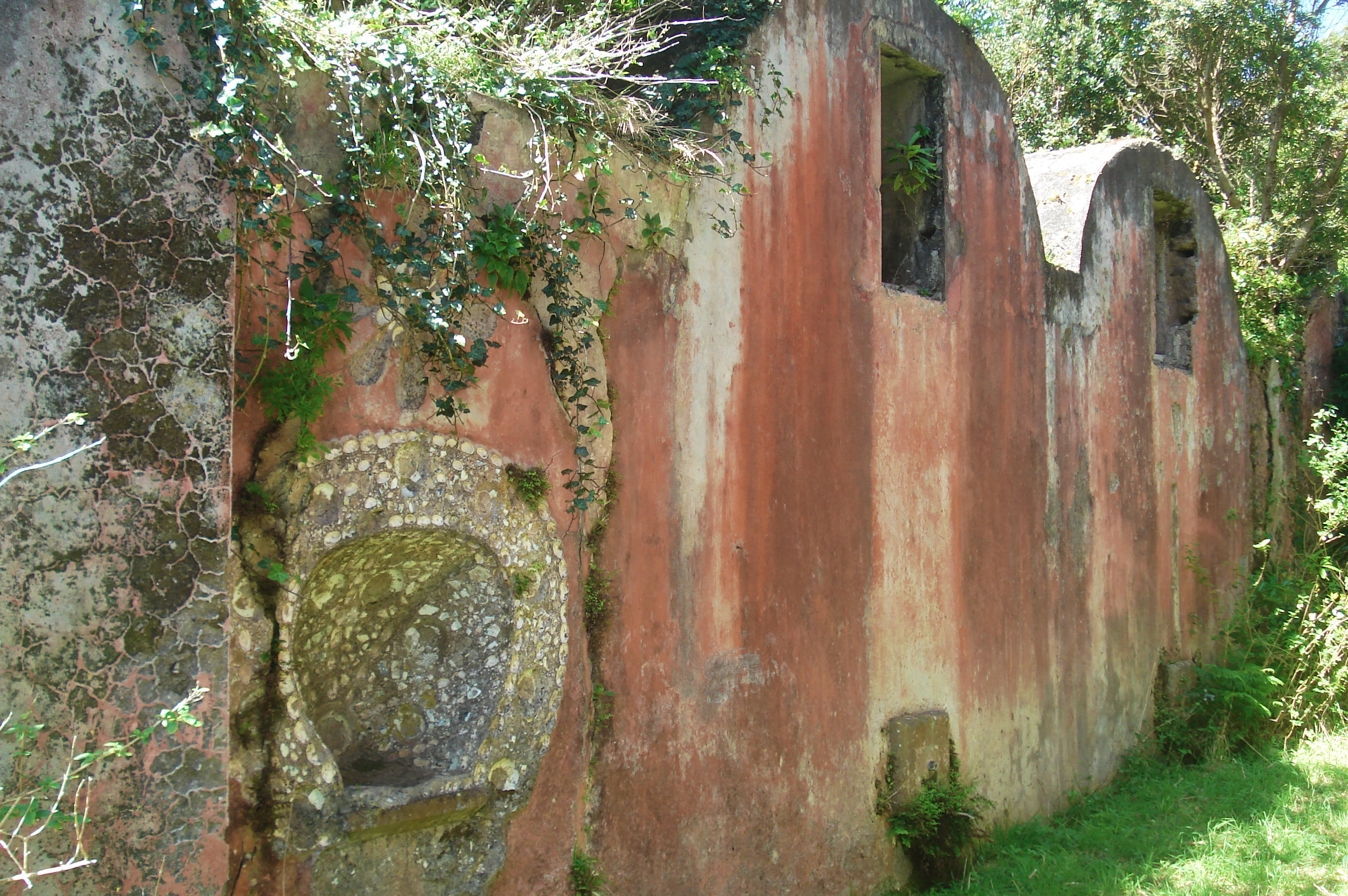
The dual vaulted-ceiling cistern occupying a comparable space alongside the main house, with shell decorated fountain (to the left)

Pilar was the late 18th century residence of Manuel Inácio de Souza Sarmento, a rich politician in the municipal council of Horta and property-owner. He inherited from his father, brother and father-in-law a vast inheritance that he parlayed into property on the island, becoming a self-made millionaire in the process. Unlike many of the many estates in the Azores, this manor did not have any ancillary buildings normally associated with agricultural activities. It was conceived, along with many of the original structures, as a property of leisure, a residence with two floors with access directly to the main garden. Much of the palacette was constructed to function with the natural landscape. The two larger facades, oriented towards the south and east, were covered with windows giving views of Horta and Pico. The building was encircled with artificial platforms, delimited by median walls that were at the time gardened, but today are mere pasture. At the time, the mansion on Pilar was known for its library, considered more valuable than the libraries of the Franciscan friars of Horta, covered in wood brought back from Brazil and its ceiling encrusted with silver that imitated the heavens. The construction of the property was made from material almost totally imported onto the island. The house was decorated with mirrors, chandeliers, crystal and porcelain. Its well-manicured garden included laneways lined with exotic plants and marble pool.

The home was the site of elegant parties and formal receptions, as well as meetings of intellectuals, family members and the high-society of Horta. Sarmento kept to his nest on Lomba, and only ventured out to the city in his golden litter and always with an attendant by his side.

At the time of his death, the legendary patrimony was divided between his unscrupulous descendants. The ornate woods, windows, doors and decorations were all sold (even the marble pool was carted-off to personal residence in São Miguel) and in a few years, all had been lost by his successors.

Dr. Antônio Severino de Avelar bought and recuperated what remained of the property, which was later inherited by his son-in-law, the Viscount of Leite Perry.

Sometime in the 20th century, the abandoned structure was engulfed in flames, and the remainder of its floors were destroyed; there are still obvious remnants of the fire that burned down the two-storey building, leaving behind charred walls, flaked plaster and burnt beams.

The Palacete, along with the nearby Hermitage of Pilar were designated as components of a group of architectonic features whose preservation was important to the city of Horta, by the Regional Government of the Azores on 16 April 2010, as part of the Urbanization plan.

== Architecture ==
Access to the property is made from alleyways: one extending from the children's playground in Largo Cardeal D. José da Costa Nunes, and the other from a cul-de-sac off Calçada da Lomba and Calçada da Conceição. Both are narrow access-ways/trails that over-covered with vegetation. The space is a landscape consisting of main building, encircled by a series of terraces, partially gardened, and supported by walls with a forested spaces in the rear. Included are three large cisterns (two twinned), as well as a rectangular pond with rock in its centre.

The residence is a two-storey building, in a L plan with only its walls still standing, covered in ornate late-Baroque frame windows. These walls are constructed of plastered stone masonry and painted in reddish pigment. To the rear of the main building is a more recent kitchen annex that runs parallel to the principal body that defines a servant's courtyard. This space is delimited by a wall, and partially, by the two cisterns with vaulted ceilings. In several locations, including on the eastern wall of the cistern and western wall of the building are decorated "fountains" plastered with shells.

Of the various platforms, the principal facade (oriented towards the southeast and the city of Horta) is encircled by side walls ornamented with shell-like sculptures at their corners. This facade is also the location of a grand outdoor double staircase, that descends to a narrow platform that functioned as a lookout or Baroque theatre.

== Sources ==
Notes

Sources

- Goulart, Osório (1902), Álbum da Visita Régia à Ilha do Faial – Memória Narrativa (in Portuguese), Lisbon, Portugal: Imprensa Nacional
- Brum, José Bettencourt (1994), Coisas da Nossa Terra. Crónicas (in Portuguese), Horta (Azores), Portugal: Câmara Municipal da Horta
- Arquivo da Arquitectura Popular dos Açores (in Portuguese) (115 ed.), Ponta Delgada (Azores), Portugal
- "Edifícios e Elementos de Qualidade – Plano de Urbanização da Cidade da Horta", Arquivo da Arquitectura Popular dos Açores (in Portuguese) (40 ed.), Ponta Delgada (Azores), Portugal
