= Portuguese ironclad Vasco da Gama =

Portuguese ironclad

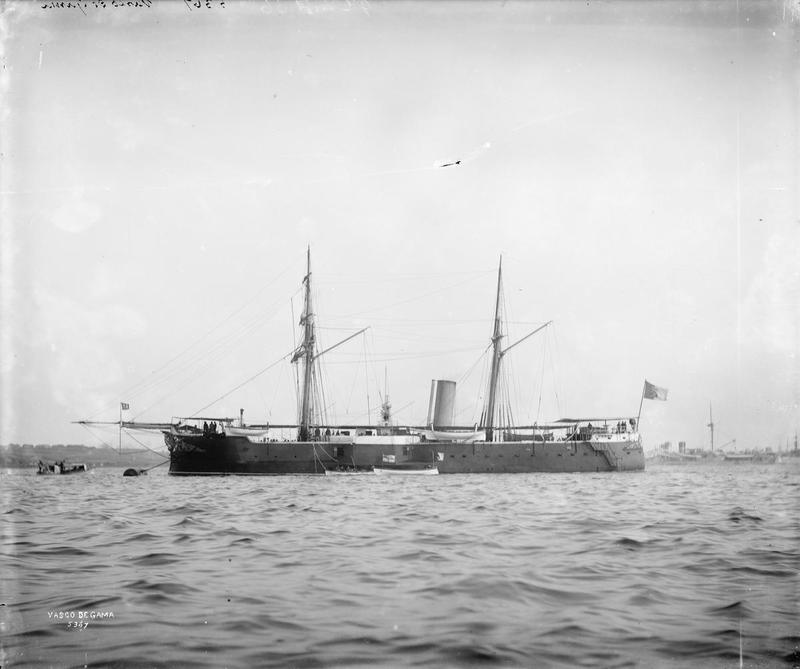
- Vasco da Gama at the opening of the Kaiser Wilhelm Canal in 1895

History

Portugal
- Name: Vasco da Gama
- Namesake: Vasco da Gama
- Builder: Thames Iron Works, Blackwall, London
- Laid down: 1875
- Launched: 1 December 1875
- Completed: 1878
- Fate: Broken up in 1935

General characteristics
- Displacement: 2,384 t (2,346 long tons; 2,628 short tons)
- Length: 200 ft (61 m) pp
- Beam: 40 ft (12 m)
- Draft: 19 ft (5.8 m)
- Installed power: 3,000 ihp (2,200 kW)
- Sail plan: Barquentine rig
- Speed: 10.3 knots (19.1 km/h; 11.9 mph)
- Complement: 232 men
- Armament: 2 × 10.2 in (260 mm) guns; 1 × 5.9 in (150 mm) gun; 4 × 9-pounder guns
- Armor: Belt: 9 in (230 mm); Battery: 10 in (250 mm)

Vasco da Gama was an ironclad of the Portuguese Navy built in the 1870s by the Thames Iron Works in London. Ordered to strengthen the defenses of the Portuguese capital of Lisbon, Vasco da Gama was launched in 1875 and completed in 1878. She served as the flagship of the Portuguese fleet for the majority of her long and peaceful career. She was rebuilt and heavily modernized between 1901 and 1903. Her crew was involved in revolts in 1913 and 1914; during the latter event, they bombarded Lisbon and killed around one hundred people. Long-since obsolete by the 1930s, Vasco da Gama was finally sold for scrapping in 1935.

== Design ==
Vasco de Gama was the only capital ship to be built for the Portuguese Navy; ordered from a British shipyard, she was intended to defend the capital at Lisbon from naval attack.

Vasco da Gama was 200 feet (61 m) long between perpendiculars, and she had a beam of 40 ft (12 m), though at the main battery guns, the ship was 46 ft 6 in (14.17 m) wide. She had a maximum draft of 19 ft (5.8 m). She displaced 2,384 metric tons (2,346 long tons; 2,628 short tons) as originally built. The ship was propelled by a marine steam engine driving a single screw propeller, with steam provided by an unknown number of boilers vented through a single funnel. Her propulsion system was rated at 3,000 indicated horsepower (2,200 kW) and produced a top speed of 10.3 knots (19.1 km/h; 11.9 mph). She was fitted with a two-masted barquentine rig to supplement the steam engine. She had a crew of 232 officers and men.

As built, Vasco da Gama was armed with a main battery of two 10.2 in (260 mm) guns, placed in an armored, octagonal box amidships. Each gun had multiple gun ports, and the box extended beyond the sides of the hull, allowing a measure of end-on fire ahead and astern. She was also equipped with a single 5.9 in (150 mm) gun mounted on her stern, and four 9-pounder guns for close-range defense against torpedo boats.

She was protected with a complete iron armored belt that was 4 inches (100 mm) thick on either end and 9 in (230 mm) thick amidships, where it protected the ammunition magazines and propulsion machinery spaces. The main battery box was protected by armor plate that ranged in thickness from 6 to 10 inches (150 to 250 mm).

=== Modifications ===
The ship was extensively reconstructed in 1901. She was cut in half and lengthened by a 32 ft 6 in (9.91 m) long section. She was fitted with new engines and more powerful water-tube boilers rated at 6,000 ihp (4,500 kW); this increased her speed to 15.5 kn (28.7 km/h; 17.8 mph). Her sailing rig also was removed. Her main battery guns were replaced with new 8 in (203 mm) L/40 guns in sponsons, the short 5.9-inch gun was replaced by a new long-barreled 5.9-inch L/45 gun, and six 3-pounders augmented her close-range defense. Her iron belt armor was removed and stronger steel armor was installed in its place. The ship's crew increased to 260 officers and men. All of the changes caused her displacement to rise to 2,972 metric tons (2,925 long tons; 3,276 short tons).

== Service history ==
Vasco da Gama c. 1904

Vasco da Gama was laid down at the Thames Iron Works shipyard in London, Britain in 1875, and was launched on 1 December 1875. The ship was completed in 1878. She served as part of the coastal defense force that protected Lisbon, the Portuguese capital, and the mouth of the river Tagus. On 26 June 1897, Vasco da Gama participated in the Fleet Review at Spithead celebrating Queen Victoria's Diamond Jubilee. At the time, the ship was commanded by Captain Augusto Barreto de Vascomellos. In 1901, Vasco da Gama was taken into drydock at Orlando shipyard in Livorno, Italy, for a major reconstruction. Work on Vasco da Gama was completed by 1903. On 27 August 1907, a gas explosion aboard the ship injured several crewmen.

Vasco da Gama remained the flagship of the Portuguese Navy at least into the 1910s, as the Portuguese naval budget was insufficient to fund a suitable replacement vessel. During this period, the Portuguese Navy played a major role in domestic politics. Amid political unrest in April 1913, part of the crew of Vasco da Gama had to be removed from the ship, as they had been involved in a planned ultra-Radical coup d'état against the First Portuguese Republic. On 14 May 1915, the crew again participated in unrest; they mutinied and killed the ship's captain and bombarded Lisbon, killing around one hundred people.

The Portuguese Army launched a coup against the government in December 1917, and the navy retaliated on 8 January 1918 to restore the republican government. Vasco da Gama, still the fleet flagship, and the destroyers Douro and Guadiana anchored in Lisbon, where army field artillery took the ships under fire. Vasco da Gama traded shots with the artillery, but after about twenty-five minutes of shooting, abandoned the effort and flew a white flag, prompting Douro and Guadiana to do the same. None of the ships were damaged in the incident.

Thoroughly obsolete, she remained in the Portuguese fleet until 1935, when she was sold for scrapping.
