= Portuguese destroyer Tejo (1904) =

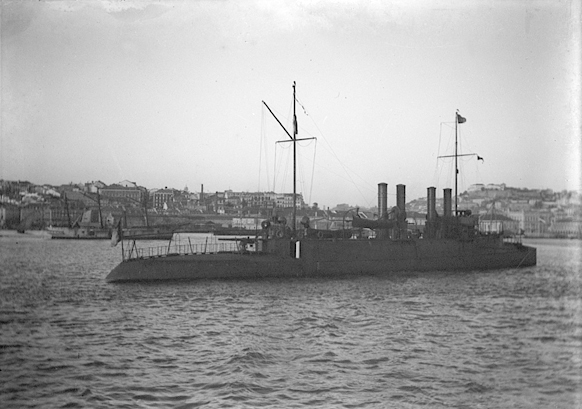
- Tejo, c. 1911–1915

History

Portugal
- Name: Tejo
- Laid down: 1901
- Launched: 1904
- Fate: Scrapped in 1927

General characteristics
- Class & type: Tejo-class destroyer
- Displacement: 522 tons
- Length: 70 m (230 ft)
- Beam: 6.96 m (22.8 ft)
- Draught: 2.51 m (8 ft 3 in)
- Propulsion: 7000 hp
- Speed: 25 kn (46 km/h; 29 mph)
- Complement: 85

Tejo was Portugal's first destroyer, and the first destroyer to be built in Portugal. It was the only ship of its class to be built. Launching in 1904, it served with the Portuguese Navy until 1927.

== Construction and design ==
In 1901 the ship was started in the Naval Arsenal of Lisbon. This was part of a plan to retrofit the Portuguese Navy, a plan implemented during the reign of Carlos I of Portugal. The ship was originally classified as a "torpedo-gunboat", and was designed to fill the role of gunboat, torpedo boat and destroyer.

The ship, displacing 522 tons, was designed to be 70 metres (230 ft) long with a beam of 6.96 m (22.8 ft) and a draught of 2.51 m (8 ft 3 in). The engines provided 7000 hp which gave Tejo a speed of 25 kn (46 km/h; 29 mph). The vessel had a complement of 85.

== Service history ==
Tejo went into service in 1904, but tests were continued on it until 1906. The initial armament consisted of one 100 mm (3.9 in) gun, one 65 mm (2.6 in) gun, four 47 mm (1.9 in) guns and two torpedo tubes. However, during tests, its broad range of roles limited its effectiveness overall. The decision was then made to transform Tejo completely into a destroyer.

After the First Portuguese Republic was established, the ship was recommissioned as NRP Tejo.

In 1910, Tejo accidentally ran aground in Peniche and suffered severe damage. Five years later, in 1915, the ship was taken to port to be converted completely to a destroyer. These changes were completed in 1917 and the ship became a full-fledged destroyer. It retained most of its armament, only swapping the 65 mm gun for a 76 mm (3.0 in) gun. While undergoing tests, Tejo proved to be the fastest ship of the Portuguese Navy.

Tejo was scrapped in 1927.

This was the second ship in Portugal's history to bear the name Tejo. A gunboat in 1868 was the first and a destroyer of the Vouga class - launched in 1935 - was the third.

== Note ==
- This article was translated from the Contratorpedeiro português Tejo article in the Portuguese language Wikipedia.

== Bibliography ==
- Campbell, N. J. M. (1979). "Portugal". In Chesneau, Roger & Kolesnik, Eugene M. (eds.). Conway's All the World's Fighting Ships 1860–1905. Greenwich: Conway Maritime Press. pp. 377–379. ISBN 0-8317-0302-4.
