= HMS Coventry (D43) =

C-class light cruiser of the British Royal Navy

Coordinates: 32°48′N 28°17′E

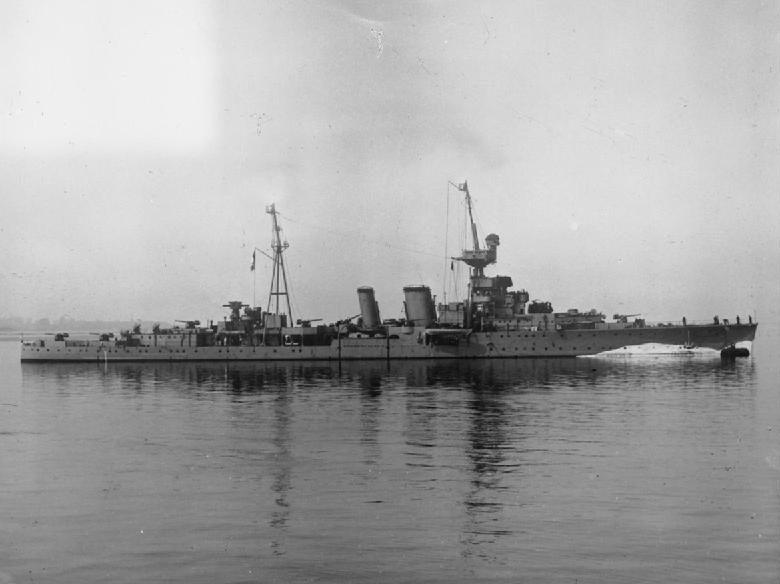

History

United Kingdom
- Name: HMS Coventry
- Builder: Swan Hunter and Wigham Richardson, Wallsend-on-Tyne
- Laid down: 4 August 1916
- Launched: 6 July 1917
- Commissioned: 21 February 1918
- Reclassified: Converted to anti-aircraft cruiser before the Second World War
- Identification: Pennant number: 4C (18 Jan); 61 (18 Apr); 43 (19 Nov); I.43 (1936); D.43 (1940)
- Fate: Damaged and scuttled 14 September 1942
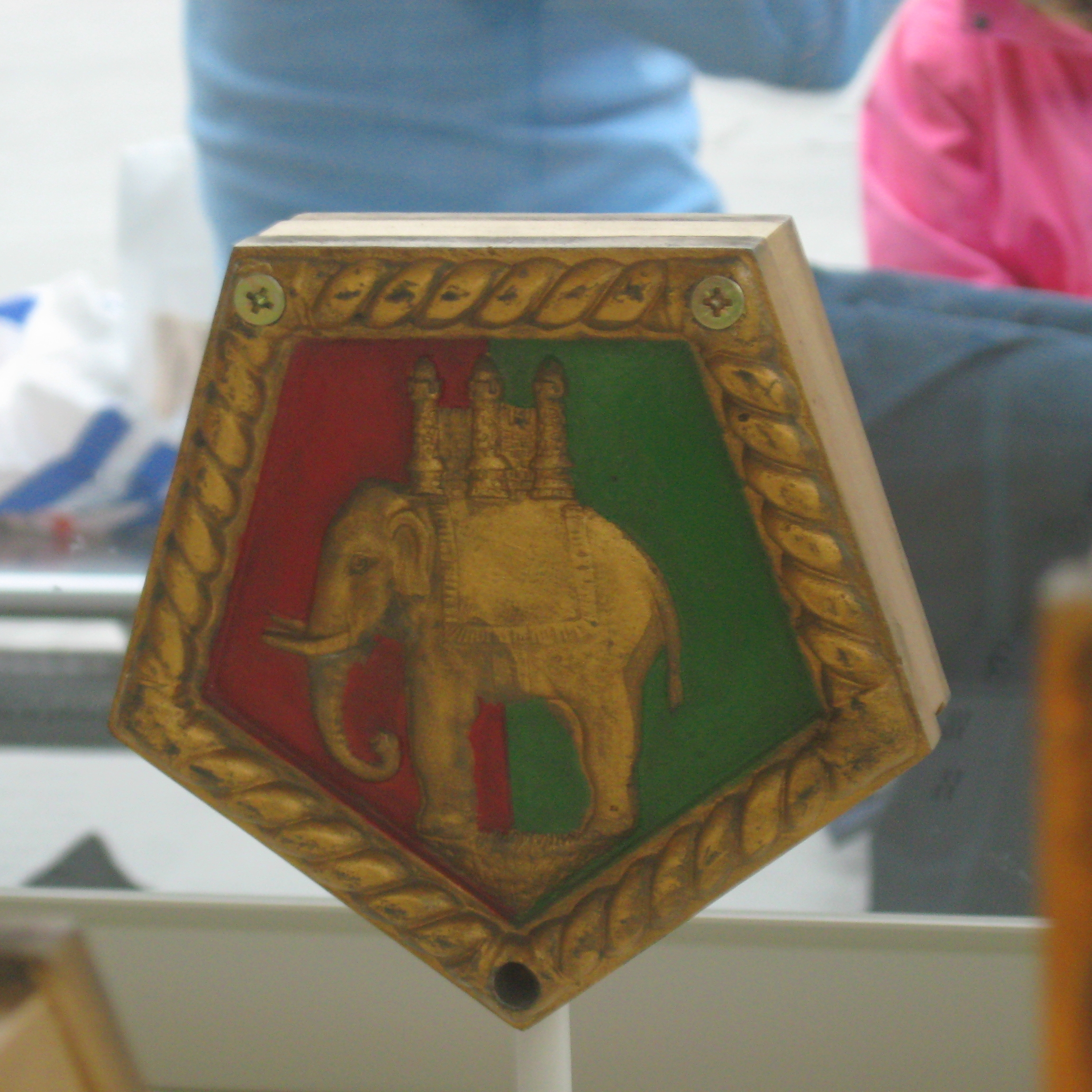
- Badge

General characteristics
- Class & type: C-class light cruiser
- Displacement: 4,190 tons
- Length: 450 ft (140 m)
- Beam: 43.6 ft (13.3 m)
- Draught: 14 ft (4.3 m)
- Propulsion: Two Brown-Curtis geared turbines; Six Yarrow boilers; Two propellers; 40,000 shp
- Speed: 29 knots (54 km/h)
- Range: carried 300 tons (950 tons maximum) of fuel oil
- Complement: 327
- Armament: (as built): 5 × 6-inch (152 mm) (152 mm) guns; 2 × 3-inch (76 mm) (76 mm) guns; 2 × 2-pounder (40 mm) guns; 8 × 21-inch (533 mm) torpedo tubes; (At outbreak of World War 2): 10 × 4-inch (102 mm) (102 mm) guns on high-angle mounts; 1 × octuple QF 2-pdr (1.6 in (40 mm)) AA guns; 8 × 12.7mm machine guns on two quad mounts
- Armour: 3 inch side (amidships); 2¼-1½ inch side (bows); 2 inch side (stern); 1 inch upper decks (amidships); 1 inch deck over rudder

HMS Coventry was a C-class light cruiser of the Royal Navy, named after the English city of Coventry. She was part of the Ceres group of the C-class of cruisers.

== Early career and wartime service ==
Coventry was initially going to be called HMS Corsair. She was laid down on 4 August 1916, launched 6 July 1917 and completed for naval service in February 1918. HMS Coventry was in the 5th Light Cruiser squadron from February 1918 till May 1919, serving in the Baltic sea. Commissioned with the pennant (D43) in May 1919 she was accepted into the Atlantic fleet, until in 1920 when HMS Coventry became the HQ ship for naval Inter allied Disarmament Commission. She went into refit in late 1920 and once the refit was completed she joined the 2nd Light cruiser squadron and she became flagship to the Rear-Admiral [D], Mediterranean Fleet Andrew Cunningham. A torpedo explosion while in Gibraltar in March 1923 caused the death of two of her crew, Chief Stoker Burt and ERA Jackson.

In 1935, Coventry went into Portsmouth Dockyard to be refitted as an anti-aircraft cruiser. This refit involved the removal of her 6-inch guns and torpedo tubes, and the fitting of 10 QF 4-inch Mk V guns on single high-angle mountings and 2 octuple-mounted 2-pounder 'pom-pom' guns. The after one of these was replaced in 1936/7 by two quadruple Mark I mounts for the 0.5 inch (12.7 mm) Vickers Mark III machine gun. At the outbreak of World War II HMS Coventry was serving with the Home Fleet between 1939 and 1940, and was damaged on 1 January 1940 in a German air attack on the Shetland Islands, north of Scotland. She was assigned to the Mediterranean fleet in 1940, and was torpedoed and damaged by the Italian submarine Neghelli in the eastern Mediterranean. Coventry also participated in the Battle of Cape Spartivento.

== The Victoria Cross ==
On 18 May 1941 the first Victoria Cross of the Mediterranean campaign was awarded posthumously to Petty Officer Alfred Edward Sephton for "great courage and endurance" while on HMS Coventry as she was being attacked on 17 May 1941 by German Stuka dive bombers while off Crete. Coventry had gone to the assistance of hospital ship Aba, which was being attacked by German dive-bombers. When the enemy engaged Coventry, raking her with machine-gun fire, Petty Officer Sephton was mortally wounded, a bullet actually passing through his body and injuring an able seaman beside him. Although in great pain and partially blinded, he stuck to his instruments and carried out his duties until the attack was over. He died of his injuries next day and was buried at sea. His VC was on display at Coventry Cathedral but was stolen on 25 September 1990.

== Loss ==
HMS Coventry was heavily damaged in the Eastern Mediterranean, northwest of Alexandria, Egypt, by 16 German Junkers Ju 88s of I./Lehrgeschwader 1 under the command of Joachim Helbig, whilst participating in Operation Agreement. 8./StG 3 also took part in the attack. The ship was on fire and had to be scuttled by HMS Zulu.

== Bibliography ==
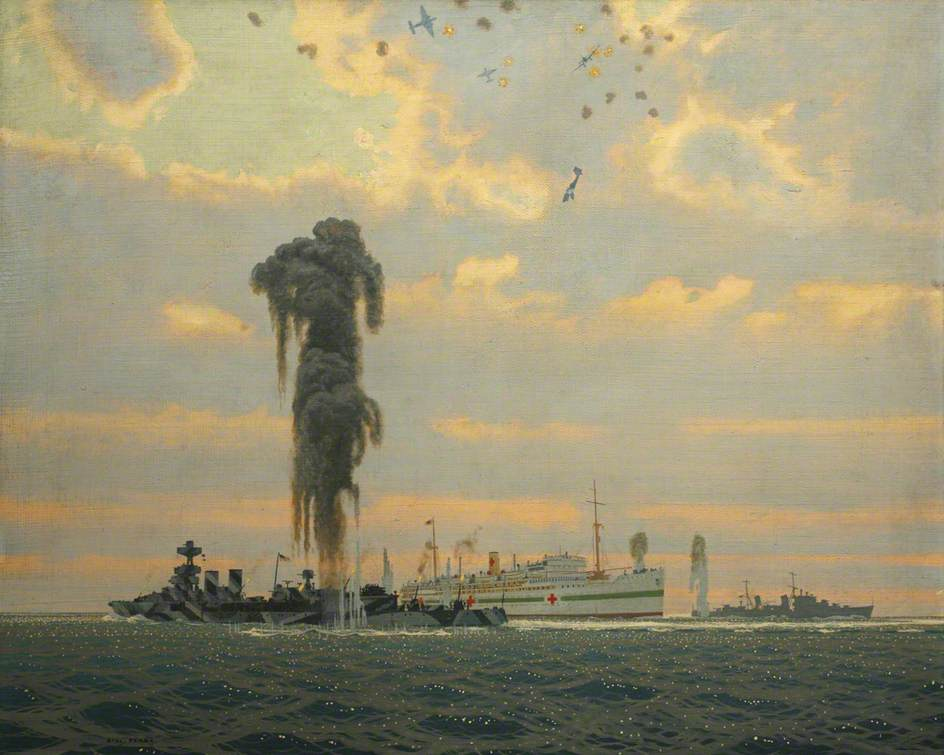
Rescue of the Hospital Ship Aba by the Coventry, painting by Charles Pears

- Chadwick, Frank (1999) 'Gash Boat HMS Coventry 1939-1942' Western Isles Publishing Company Ltd Stornoway. ISBN 0 906437 16 4
- Colledge, J. J.; Warlow, Ben & Bush, Steve (2020). Ships of the Royal Navy: The Complete Record of all Fighting Ships of the Royal Navy from the 15th Century to the Present (5th revised and updated ed.). Seaforth Publishing. ISBN 978-1-5267-9327-0.
- Dunn, Steve R. (2022). The Harwich Striking Force: The Royal Navy's Front Line in the North Sea, 1914-1918. Seaforth Publishing. ISBN 978-1-3990-1596-7.
- Friedman, Norman (2010). British Cruisers: Two World Wars and After. Seaforth Publishing. ISBN 978-1-59114-078-8.
- Lenton, H. T. (1998). British & Empire Warships of the Second World War. Naval Institute Press. ISBN 1-55750-048-7.
- Preston, Antony (1985). "Great Britain and Empire Forces". In Gray, Randal (ed.). Conway's All the World's Fighting Ships 1906–1921. Naval Institute Press. pp. 1–104. ISBN 0-85177-245-5.
- Raven, Alan & Roberts, John (1980). British Cruisers of World War Two. Naval Institute Press. ISBN 0-87021-922-7.
- Rohwer, Jürgen (2005). Chronology of the War at Sea 1939–1945: The Naval History of World War Two (Third Revised ed.). Naval Institute Press. ISBN 1-59114-119-2.
- Whitley, M. J. (1995). Cruisers of World War Two: An International Encyclopedia. Cassell. ISBN 1-86019-874-0.
