= Vouga =

Vouga may refer to:

- Vouga River (Centro Region of Portugal)
- Vouga, Portugal, former municipality
- Saint Vouga (died 585), Irish priest who became a bishop in Brittany
