= Naval School (Portugal) =

Higher education naval academy in Alfeite, Portugal (1782-present)

Coordinates: 38°39′46″N 9°08′50″W

Naval Academy
- Escola Naval
- Motto: Talant de bien faire
- Motto in English: The talent of doing well
- Type: Naval academy
- Established: 1796 (Royal Academy of the Midshipmen); 1823 (Portuguese and Brazilian midshipmen academies separation); 1845 (Naval Academy)
- Commander: Rear-admiral Edgar Marcos de Bastos Ribeiro
- Academic staff: 127
- Students: 270
- Location: Alfeite (Almada), District of Setúbal, Portugal
- Campus: Lisbon Naval Base
- Website: Naval Academy

The Naval Academy (Portuguese: Escola Naval) is a higher education level naval academy in Alfeite, Portugal. The Naval Academy is located in the Lisbon Naval Base premises, located on the south bank of the Tagus river, in front of the city of Lisbon.

The Academy offers university and polytechnical graduate programmes intended to train the future officers of the Portuguese Navy. It also offers postgraduate programmes, these being open to civilians, as well to naval and other military personnel.

== History ==
The present Portuguese Naval Academy was created in the 18th century as the Royal Academy of the Midshipmen (Academia Real dos Guardas-Marinhas).

In 1782, the Company of Midshipmen (Companhia dos Guardas-Marinhas) was created to frame and train the midshipmen (naval officer candidates) of the Portuguese Navy. The Company of Midshipmen was installed in the building of the Naval Arsenal of Lisbon.

The Royal Academy of the Midshipmen was created in 1792, as a university-level naval academy. This Academy integrated the already existing Company of Midshipmen as its student corps.

In 1807, the Army of Napoleon invaded Portugal. In order not to be captured by the Napoleonic forces and maintain the independence of the Kingdom, the Portuguese Royal Court and government are transferred to the Portuguese colony of Brazil, continuing to rule from there. The Royal Academy of the Midshipmen and its Company of Midshipmen also embark in the naval fleet that carries the Royal Court to Brazil and are installed in Rio de Janeiro, in 1808.

In 1823, one year following the independence of Brazil, the faculty and the students of the Academy of the Midshipmen had to choose either the Brazilian or the Portuguese nationality. Those that chose the Portuguese nationality returned to Portugal and the others remained in Brazil. Then, two academies come into existence: the Imperial Academy of Midshipmen (Academia Imperial dos Guardas-Marinhas) in the Empire of Brazil (that would become the present Brazilian Naval School) and the Royal Academy of Midshipmen in the Kingdom of Portugal.

The Portuguese Royal Academy of Midshipmen was reorganised in 1845, becoming the Naval Academy (Escola Naval).

== Organisation ==
The Portuguese Naval Academy includes:

- Commanding officer - a rear-admiral;
- Deputy commanding officer - a naval captain;
- Scientific Council;
- Pedagogical Council;
- Board of School Discipline;
- Naval Research Centre (CINAV);
- Office for the Coordination of Evaluation;
- Directorate of Teaching;
- Student Corps - a battalion composed of five cadet companies;
- Support services.

== Academics ==
=== University graduate programmes ===
- Master in naval military sciences, Navy speciality (5 years)
- Master in naval military sciences, Naval administration speciality (5 years)
- Master in naval military sciences, Marines speciality (5 years)
- Master in naval military sciences, Naval engineering (mechanics) speciality (5 years)
- Master in naval military sciences, Naval engineering (weapons and electronics) speciality (5 years)
- Master in naval military sciences, Naval medicine speciality (only the part of naval training, the medicine studies being done in the Faculty of Medicine of the University of Lisbon)

=== Polytechnical graduate programmes ===
- Bachelor, Administration and secretariat (3 years)
- Bachelor, Weapons and electronics (3 years)
- Bachelor, Mechanics (3 years)
- Bachelor, Marines (3 years)
- Bachelor, Computer science (3 years)
- Bachelor, Divers (3 years)
- Bachelor, Hydrography (3 years)
- Bachelor, Communications (3 years)

=== Postgraduate programmes ===
- Postgraduate in hyperbaric medicine
- Postgraduate in law and cybersecurity
- Master in maritime history
- Master in military history

=== Other programmes ===
- Training program for special duty officers
- Training program for limited duty Officers
- Basic training program for officers

== Research and development ==
The Portuguese Naval Academy includes the Naval Research Centre (CINAV, Centro de Investigação Naval) that has the responsibility of coordinating, developing and supporting naval research activities. Some research projects being developed at the CINAV are:

- Submarine acoustics;
- Light weapons;
- Electroencephalogram analysis;
- Georeferenced data analysis;
- Naval unmanned air vehicles;
- Marine machines maintenance.
