= December 1917 coup d'état =

Political uprising in Lisbon, Portugal

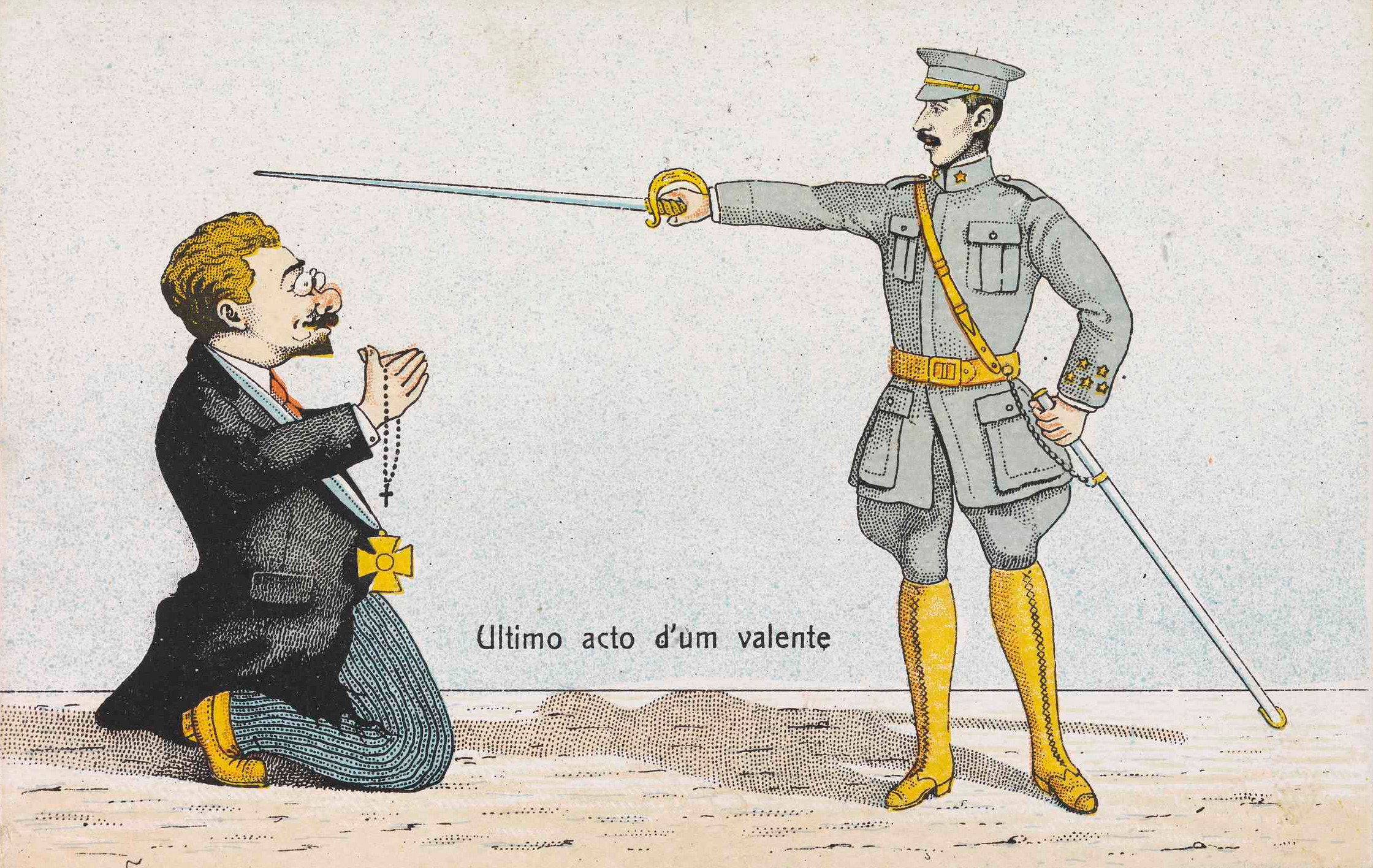
- Postcard with caricature of Sidónio Pais's rise to power ousting through a military coup Afonso Costa's Democratic Party government
Date	5–8 December 1917
Location	Portugal
Result	Sidónio Pais' victory

Belligerents
Portuguese Government	Rebels led by Sidónio Pais

Commanders and leaders
José Norton de Matos; Leote de Rego	Sidónio Pais

Strength
	250 soldiers

Casualties and losses
- 109 dead and 500 wounded

The December 1917 coup d'état (Portuguese: Golpe de Estado de Dezembro de 1917) was a politico-military uprising led by Sidónio Pais, which started in Lisbon, Portugal, with the objective of taking power from the Democratic Party, which had won every election in Portugal since the foundation of the Portuguese First Republic in October 1910.

== Background ==
Portugal was taking part in World War I, a participation that was largely unpopular due to its social and economic impacts, and that the government tried to contain using repressive measures. A conspiracy emerged within the Unionists, initially supported by its leader Manuel de Brito Camacho, but who later had a change of heart and did not participate in the coup. Sidónio Pais lead the coup, with the support of every political force except for the União Sagrada (a coalition between the Democratic Party and the Evolutionist Party).

== Coup ==
On the night of 5 December 1917, Sidónio Pais, with the support of multiple units of the Army, occupied the Edward VII Park and the main roads of access. The total rebel army forces were around 2.500 in number. José Norton de Matos, then war minister, took command of the government forces, as both Afonso Costa (head of government) and Augusto Soares (foreign affairs minister) were out of the country. Norton commanded the forces from the Navy Arsenal and had the support of the Navy, National Republican Guard, the Fiscal Guard, the police, and some Army units.

On 6 December 1917, multiple houses and businesses were sacked as the police did not leave its quarters. The Navy, positioned in the Tagus river and led by Leote de Rego aboard the destroyer Guadiana, exchanged fire with the rebel forces in Edward VII Park. On 7 December 1917, the government forces decided to take over the forces on Edward VII Park. A column of Navy and GNR members attempted a frontal attack from the Avenida. Another column attempted to attack from Rato, supported by artillery placed in the São Pedro de Alcântara garden (in Bairro Alto). These attacks were slow and unsuccessful. On 8 December 1917, the government handed president Bernardino Machado its resignation.

== Aftermath ==
The facilities and houses of Democratic leaders were sacked. A Military Junta, led by Sidónio Pais, was then established. The Junta officially deposed the president, government and parliament. Afonso Costa and Augusto Soares were imprisoned as they returned to the country, Norton de Matos and Leote de Rego escaped in an English steamboat, and president Bernardino Machado was exiled by the Military Junta. The Military Junta only ruled for a few days, giving way, on 11 December 1917, to a government led by Sidónio Pais. Sidónio was later elected, in a general election, as president, after the regime was altered from a semi-presidential system to a full-presidential system. The casualties of the coup are registered as 109 dead and 500 wounded.

== Gallery ==
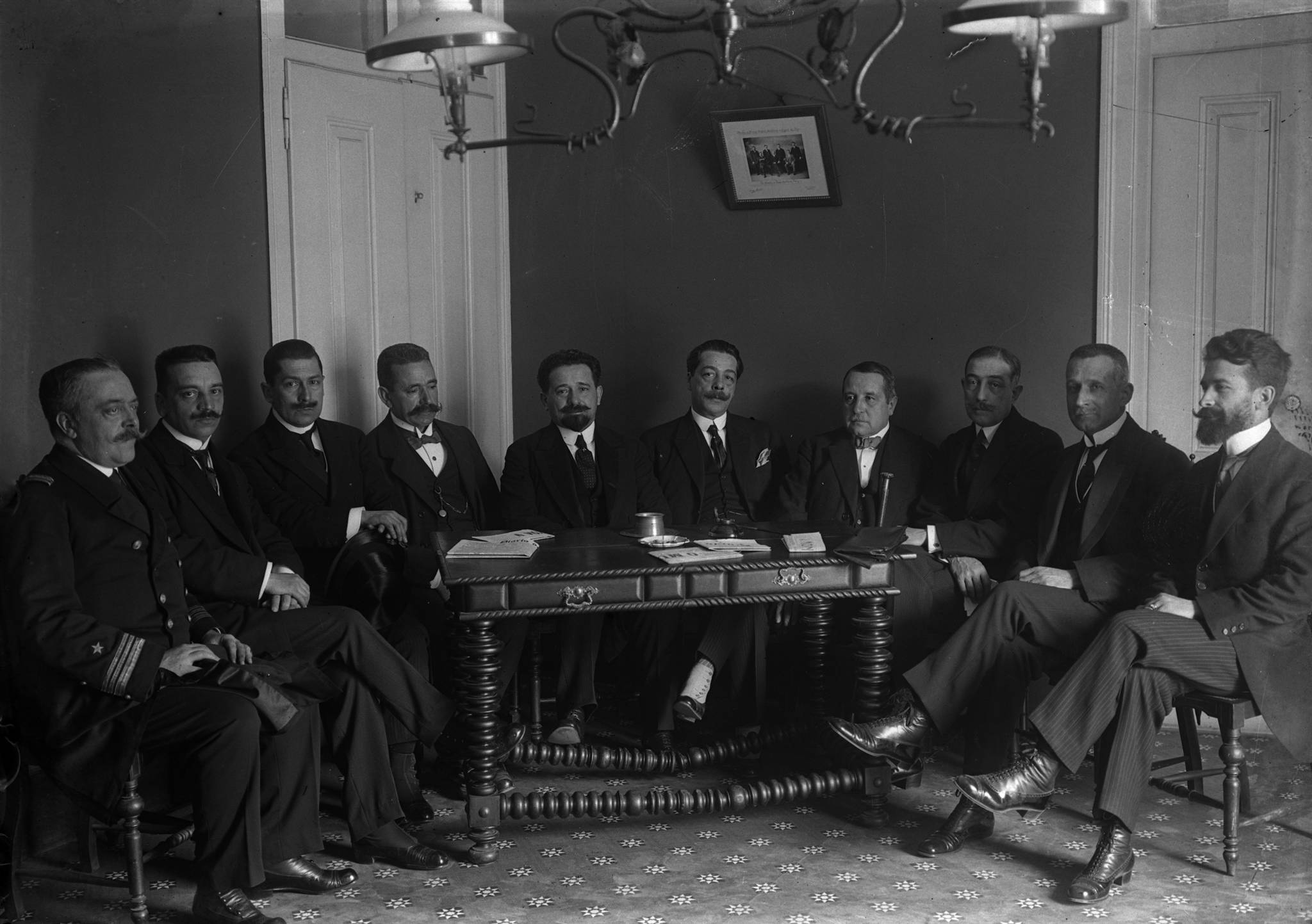
Afonso Costa's government in 1917

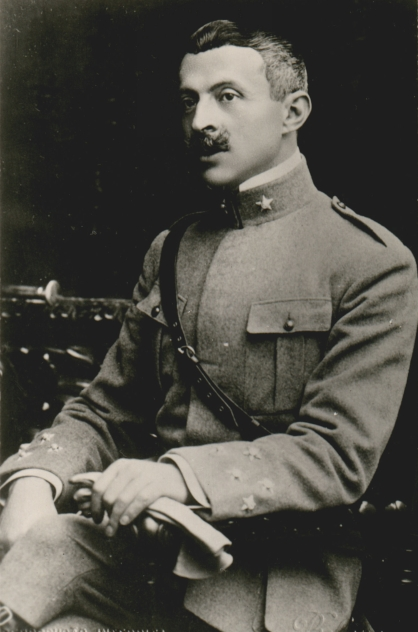
Sidónio Pais commanded the rebel forces

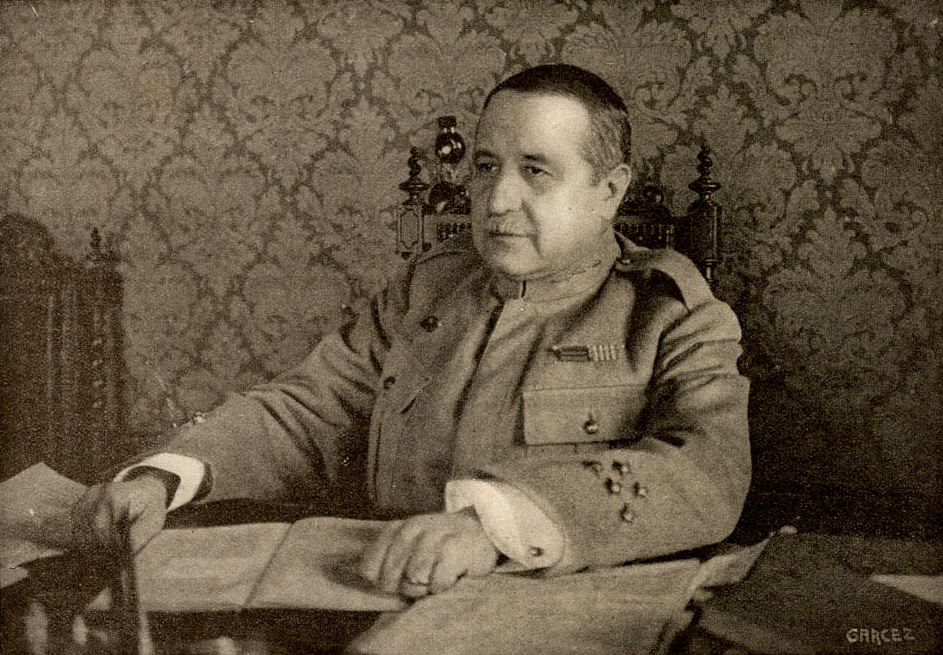
Norton de Matos commanded the government's forces

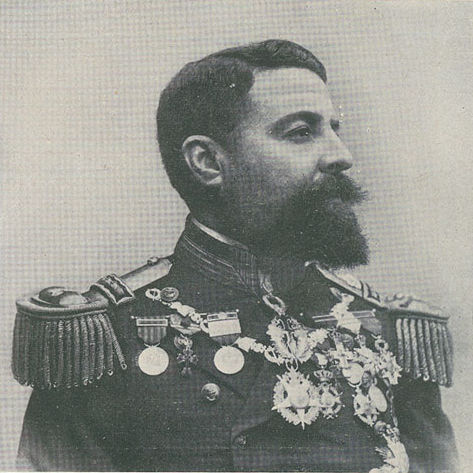
Leote de Rego (in NRP Guadiana) commanded the Navy forces

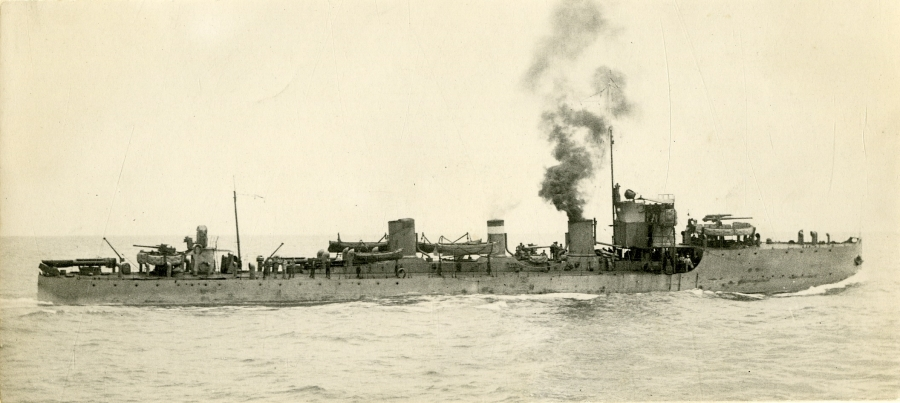
NRP Guadiana, stationed in the Tagus, exchanged fire with the rebels

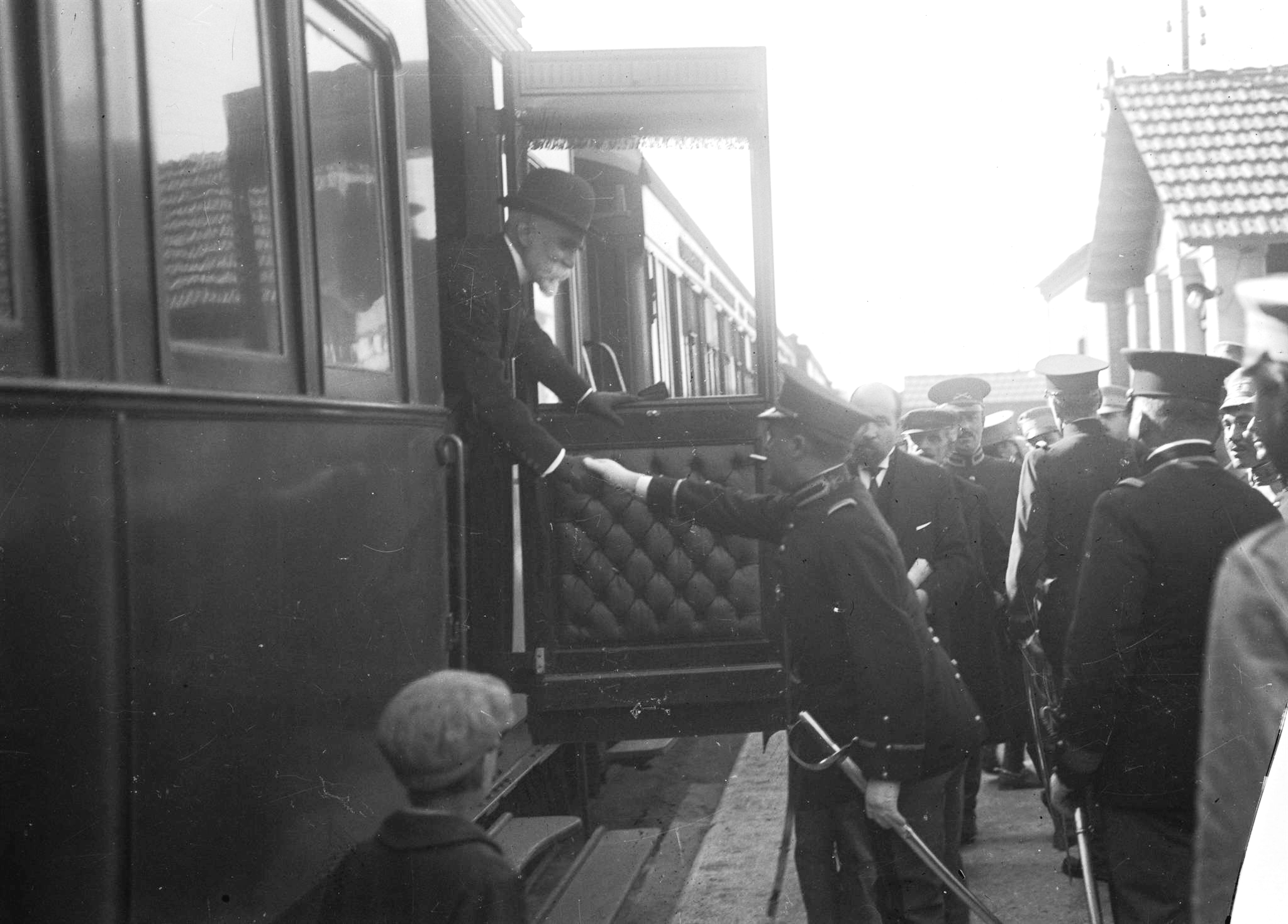
President Bernardino Machado (15 December 1917) departing for his exile

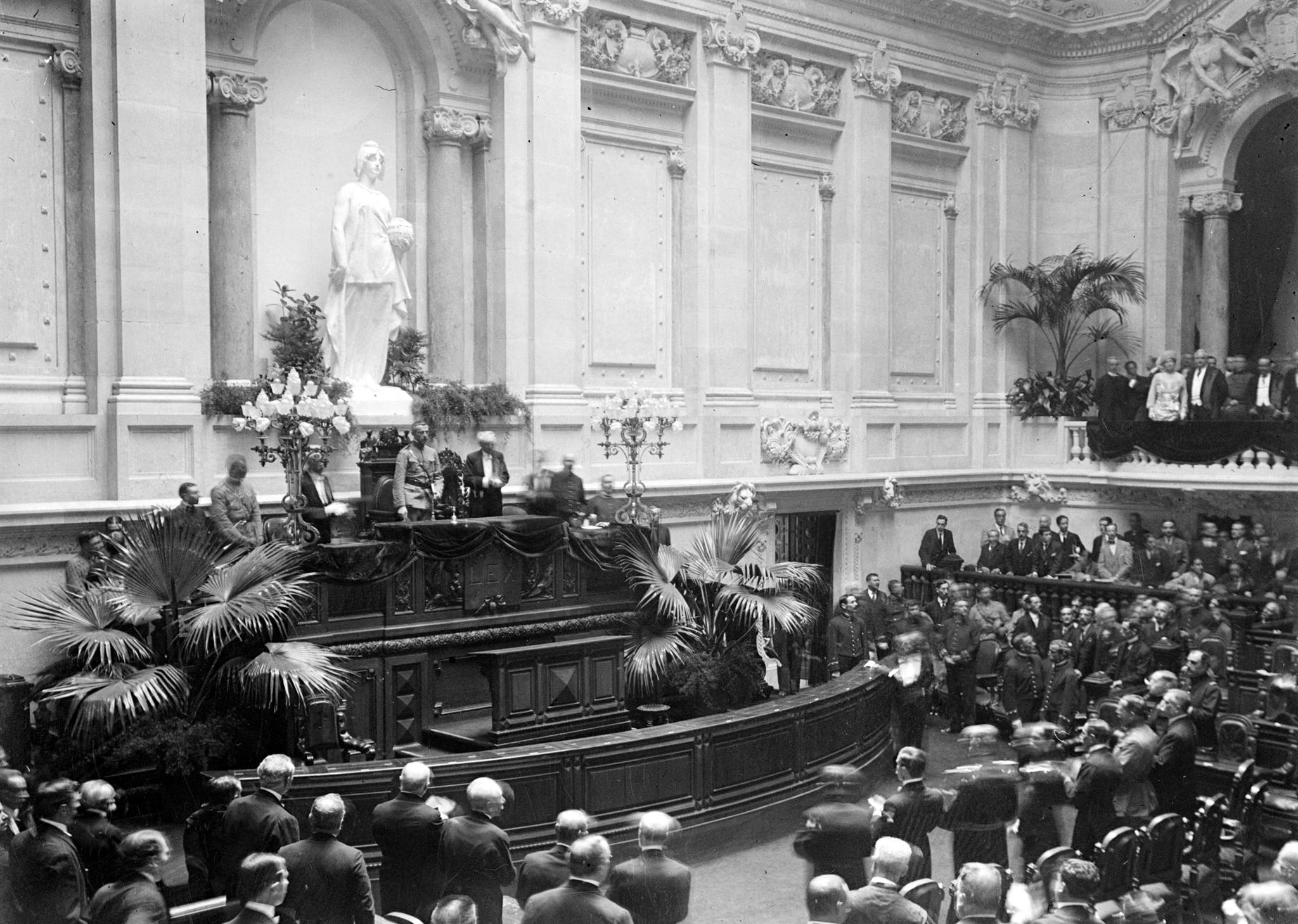
Sidónio Pais is sworn in after being elected President in the 1918 Portuguese general election

== See also ==
- History of Portugal
- Joaquim Pimenta de Castro, the previous attempt to break the Democratic Party's uninterrupted rule.
