= Lisbon Naval Base =

Main installation base of the Portuguese Navy

Coordinates: 38.6692°N 9.1503°W

Lisbon Naval Base Base Naval de Lisboa
- Alfeite (Almada), Portugal
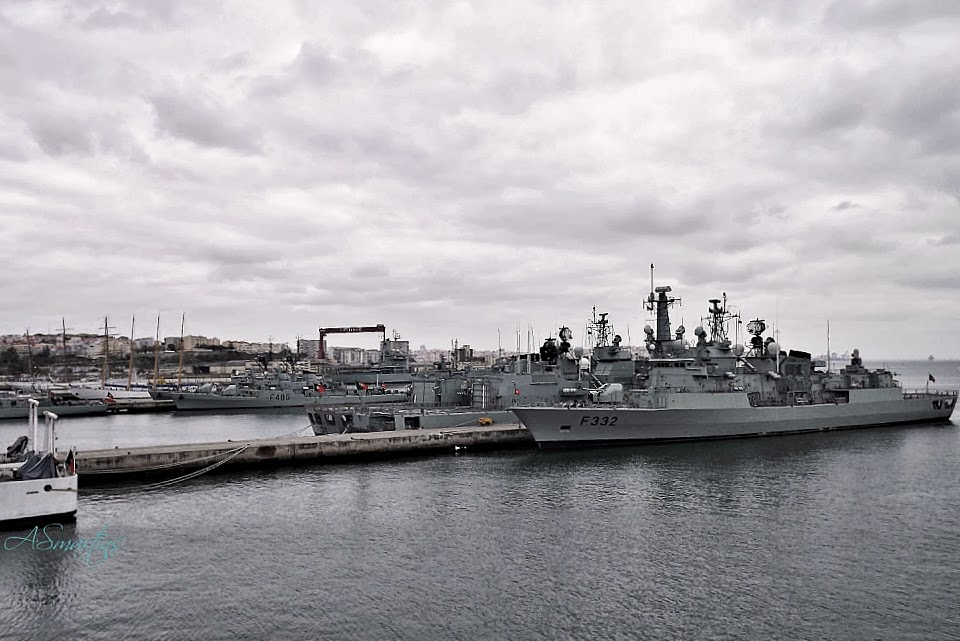
- Lisbon Naval Base

Site information
- Type: Naval base
- Controlled by: Portuguese Navy

Site history
- Built: 1920s-1950s
- In use: 1937 - Today

Garrison information
- Past commanders: Capitão de Mar e Guerra Luis Pedro Pinto Proença Mendes

The Lisbon Naval Base (Portuguese: Base Naval de Lisboa), is the main installation and operational base of the Portuguese Navy. Located at the former Royal Estate of Alfeite on the south bank of the Tagus river's estuary, near the city of Almada, the installation is sometimes referred to as the Alfeite Naval Base.

Most of the Portuguese Naval fleet ships are based at Alfeite, as well as many of its administrative, training and support services. Within its perimeter are also located the Naval School, the Naval Technologies School, the Alfeite Arsenal, the Marine corps Base and other Portuguese Navy units.

The Lisbon Naval Base is an administrative entity that – besides the main naval station at Alfeite – manages several other smaller naval facilities in the region.

== History ==
Lisbon, and the neighboring Tagus estuary, has always been the largest and most important naval base of Portugal, since the 12th century. During the Age of Discovery, in the 15th and 16th centuries, Lisbon and the Tagus became the major naval base in the World. It was from this base, that Vasco da Gama set out to discover the sea route to India.

Until after World War I, in reality there was not a single naval base, but a series of smaller bases located at various points of both banks of the Tagus. Among others, in the early 20th century, there was the Lisbon Navy Arsenal, the Doca de Belém submarine base, the Bom Sucesso seaplane base, the Vila Franca de Xira destroyer base, the Vale do Zebro torpedo boat base, the Alcântara Naval Barracks and the Doca da Marinha naval quay.

In the late 19th century, the idea of building a new naval arsenal at the site of the Royal Estate of Alfeite arose. Several senior naval officers also began to advocate the idea of concentrating the several Navy facilities in Lisbon and the Tagus, at a single site near the future new arsenal.

Construction of the new naval arsenal began in 1928 and was completed in 1937. Considered one of the largest and best equipped installations of its kind, the Alfeite Arsenal started full operation in 1938. A large naval complex – known as "the city of the Navy" – was built concurrently, to accommodate most of the ships, personnel and services of the Portuguese Navy. These were successively transferred to Alfeite up until the 1950s.

Since, 3 December 1958, the Intendência de Marinha do Alfeite (Naval Intendency of Alfeite) has been the Lisbon Naval Base.
