= List of ships of the Portuguese Navy =

This is a list of various Portuguese warships.

== Historical warships ==
=== Carracks (C), Naus (N) and galleons (G) ===
- São Gabriel (C) - 1497
- São Rafael (C) - 1497
- Flor de la mar (C) - 1502
- Esmeralda (C) - 1503
- Lobo Soares (c.1516)
- Santa Catarina do Monte Sinai (C) - 1520
- Santo António (C) - 1527
- São João Baptista (aka Botafogo) (G) - (c. 1534)
- São Bento (C) - Wrecked 1554
- São Paulo - Wrecked 1561?
- Águia - Sank 1559
- Garça - Sank 1559
- Cinco Chagas (1560/61)
- São Martinho (G) - Flagship of the "Invincible Armada" in 1588
- São Mateus (G) - part of the Portuguese Squadron of the "Invincible Armada"
- São Cristóvão (G) - part of the Portuguese Squadron of the "Invincible Armada"
- São Filipe (1583) (G) - part of the Portuguese Squadron of the "Invincible Armada"
- São Luís (1585) (G) - part of the Portuguese Squadron of the "Invincible Armada"
- São Marcos (1585) (G) - part of the Portuguese Squadron of the "Invincible Armada"
- Santiago (1585) (G) - part of the Portuguese Squadron of the "Invincible Armada"
- São João (1586) (G) - Second flagship of the Portuguese Squadron of the "Invincible Armada"
- São Bernardo (1586) (G) - part of the Portuguese Squadron of the "Invincible Armada"
- Relíquias (C) - Sank 1587
- São Tomé - Wrecked 1589
- Madre de Deus (C) - Captured by England 1592
- Santo Alberto - Wrecked 1593
- Cinco Chagas (C) - Sank 1594
- Santiago - Captured by the Dutch Republic 1602
- Santo António (G) - In 1615 fleet to India
- Santo Amaro - Wrecked 1620
- Nossa Senhora da Conceição (C) (1620) - Burnt by Algerines 1621
- Santo Alberto (C) - Sank before 1622
- São João Baptista (c. 1621) - Sank 1622
- Santa Teresa de Jesus - Wrecked 1622
- São Carlos - Wrecked 1622
- São José - Wrecked 1622
- São Francisco Xavier (C) - Flagship of 1623 fleet to India, wrecked 1625
- Santa Isabel (C) - In 1623 fleet to India, storm 1624
- Nossa Senhora da Conceição (C) - In 1623 fleet to India, scuttled after damage 1625
- Santo André (G) - In 1623 fleet to India
- Misericórdia (G) - In 1623 fleet to India
- São Simão (G) - In 1623 fleet to India, storm 1624
- Nossa Senhora da Guia - Wrecked 1624
- São Pedro (G)
- São João 366
- Cinco Chagas (C) (c. 1623) - In 1624 fleet to India
- Nossa Senhora da Quietação (C) (c. 1623) - In 1624 fleet to India
- São João (G) - In 1624 fleet to India
- Santa Catarina do Monte Sinai
- Nossa Senhora da Conceição (C/G)
- Nossa Senhora dos Remédios
- Nossa Senhora da Saúde (C)
- Nossa Senhora de Belém - Sank 1635
- Bom Jesus (G) 64/70 (1636)
- Santa Teresa (G) (c. 1637) - Burnt at the Battle of the Downs, 1639
- São Sebastião 54 - Burnt 1639
- Sacramento - Sank 1647
- Santa Luzia 30 - In 1649 fleet to Brazil
- Nossa Senhora da Atalaia - Sank 1647
- São Pedro da Ribeira (G)
- Padre Eterno (G) (1663)
- Santo António de Tana 54 - Sank 169

=== Sail battleships (ships of the line) from 1664 ===
- Rainha Santa Isabel 52 (1664) - Last known service 1669
- Santo António 54 (1665) - Captured in 1667 by Spaniards
- Santa Clara 64 (1678) - In 1682 fleet to Italy
- São João de Deus 60 (1691) - Last known service 1706
- Nossa Senhora da Glória 60 (1692) - Discarded 1707
- Nossa Senhora da Graça 60/64 (1694) - Last known service 1708
- Nossa Senhora da Estrela 64 (1694) - Discarded 1722
- Nossa Senhora da Madre de Deus 56/60 (1697) - Discarded 1732
- Nossa Senhora da Encarnação 56 (1698) - Captured in 1711 at the Battle of Rio de Janeiro

=== Sail battleships (ships of the line) from 1700 ===
- Princesa do Céu (c. 1700) - Discarded 1718?
- Nossa Senhora de Bettencourt (c. 1700) - Discarded 1701?
- Nossa Senhora do Vale (c. 1701) - Discarded 1701?
- Nossa Senhora da Conceição 80 (c. 1701) - Discarded 1724?
- Nossa Senhora da Assunção 66 (c. 1705) - Discarded 1731?
- Nossa Senhora das Portas do Céu de Rosette (c. 1706) - Discarded 1708?
- São Jorge, Nossa Senhora das Necessidades 66 (c. 1708) - Discarded 1737?
- Nossa Senhora da Conceição (c. 1710) - Discarded 1712?
- Santa Ana e São Joaquim (c. 1711) - Discarded 1718?
- Nossa Senhora da Piedade 66 (c. 1711) - Discarded 1725?
- Nossa Senhora das Angústias (c. 1713) - Discarded 1713?
- Nossa Senhora da Palma e São Pedro (c. 1715) - Discarded 1729?
- Nossa Senhora do Pilar, o Padre Eterno 70 (c. 1715) - Discarded 1740?
- Santa Rosa 66 (1715) - Sank after an explosion 1726
- Rainha dos Anjos 54-56 (c. 1716) - Burnt 1722
- São Lourenço 58 (c. 1716) - Discarded 1734?
- Nossa Senhora da Luz 66 (probably ex-Dutch Daalhem or Prins Friso 64, acquired 1717) - Discarded 1720?
- Nossa Senhora do Monte do Carmo 74 (probably ex-Dutch Zeelandia or Gelderland 72, acquired 1717) - Discarded 1724?
- Nossa Senhora do Cabo e São Pedro de Alcântara 72 (probably ex-Dutch Zeelandia or Gelderland 72, acquired 1717) - Captured by pirates 1721
- Nossa Senhora da Guia 66 (probably ex-Dutch Daalhem or Prins Friso 64, acquired 1717) - Discarded 1719?
- Nossa Senhora da Penha de França 70 (c. 1717) - Discarded 1730?
- Nossa Senhora Madre de Deus e São João Evangelista 66 (c. 1717) - Discarded 1734?
- Nossa Senhora da Atalaia 52 (c. 1719) - Discarded 1733?
- Nossa Senhora Madre de Deus e São Francisco Xavier (c. 1720) - Discarded 1732?
- Nossa Senhora da Vitória 64 (c. 1720) - Burnt 1730
- Nossa Senhora da Oliveira 50-52 (c. 1721) - Discarded 1737?
- Nossa Senhora da Nazaré 50 (c. 1721) - BU 1741
- Nossa Senhora do Rosário 50 (c. 1723) - Discarded 1740?
- Nossa Senhora do Livramento e São Francisco Xavier 66 (c. 1723) - Discarded 1735?
- Nossa Senhora do Livramento 66 (c. 1724)
- Santo António 64-74 (c. 1724) - Discarded 1725?
- Nossa Senhora da Boa Viagem (c. 1724) - Discarded 1728?
- Nossa Senhora das Ondas 58 (c. 1724) - Discarded 1738?
- Santa Teresa de Jesus 66 (c. 1724) - Discarded 1735?
- Nossa Senhora da Lampadosa 50/64 (c. 1727) - Burnt 1759?
- Nossa Senhora da Conceição e Santo António 70? (c. 1728) - Discarded 1734?
- Nossa Senhora da Estrela 64 (c. 1729) - Discarded 1736?
- Nossa Senhora do Rosário e Santo André 58 (c. 1732) - Burnt 1737
- Nossa Senhora da Conceição 74 (c. 1733) - Discarded 1745?
- Nossa Senhora da Boa Viagem 60 (c. 1734) - Discarded 1752?
- Nossa Senhora da Vitória 74 (1735) - Aground 1746
- Nossa Senhora da Esperança 70 (c. 1735) - Discarded 1742?
- Nossa Senhora da Arrábida 60-62 (c. 1736) - BU 1744?
- Nossa Senhora da Glória 72-74 (c. 1737) - Sunk 1752
- Nossa Senhora da Oliveira de Guimarães 52-60 (c. 1737) - Discarded 1747?
- Nossa Senhora do Bom Sucesso 50 (c. 1738) - Discarded 1745?
- Nossa Senhora do Monte do Carmo 46 (c. 1738) - Discarded 1747?
- Nossa Senhora da Penha de França 56 (c. 1739) - Discarded 1750?
- Nossa Senhora da Nazaré (c. 1740) - Wrecked? 1740?
- Nossa Senhora da Conceição e São João Baptista (c. 1740) - Sold 1745
- Nossa Senhora Madre de Deus e Santo António 64 (c. 1740) - Discarded 1749?
- São João Baptista (c. 1741) - Discarded 1747? (ex-British?)
- São Francisco Xavier e Todo o Bem 50 (c. 1741) - Burnt and BU 1757
- Nossa Senhora da Piedade (Nossa Senhora das Mercês) (c. 1742) - Discarded 1754?
- Nossa Senhora da Caridade e São Francisco de Paula (c. 1744) - Discarded 1755?
- Nossa Senhora da Misericórdia (c. 1744) - Discarded 1754?
- Nossa Senhora da Nazaré 60 (c. 1744) - Discarded 1755?
- Nossa Senhora das Necessidades 70 (c. 1747) - Discarded 1764?
- Nossa Senhora do Vencimento e São José 58 (c. 1748) - Discarded 1764?
- São José e Nossa Senhora da Conceição 60-72 (c. 1748) - Discarded 1767?
- Nossa Senhora do Livramento e São José 60 (c. 1749) - Discarded 1762?
- Nossa Senhora das Brotas 50 (c. 1751) - Discarded 1765?
- Nossa Senhora da Conceição e São José 60-72 (c. 1751) - Discarded 1763?
- Nossa Senhora da Natividade 50 (c. 1752) - Discarded 1766?
- Santo António e Justiça (c. 1752) - Discarded 1766?
- Nossa Senhora da Conceição e São Vicente Ferreira 50 (c. 1755) - Discarded 1764?
- Nossa Senhora da Assunção 64-66 (c. 1757) - Discarded 1762?
- Nossa Senhora da Caridade, São Francisco de Paula e Santo António (c. 1757) - Sold 1788
- Nossa Senhora da Ajuda e São Pedro de Alcântara 62-68 (c. 1759) - Rebuilt 1793 and renamed as Princesa da Beira, sold 1834
- Santo António 60 (c. 1760)
- Nossa Senhora do Monte do Carmo 74 (c. 1760) - Wrecked 1774
- São José e Nossa Senhora das Mercês 54/64 (c. 1761) - Wrecked 1793/94
- Nossa Senhora Madre de Deus e São José 62-64 (c. 1761) - Discarded 1780?
- Nossa Senhora do Pilar 74 (c. 1763) - Rebuilt 1793 and renamed Conde Dom Henrique, to Brazil 1822
- Santo António e São José 64-74 (c. 1763) - Rebuilt 1794 and renamed Infante Dom Pedro, rebuilt 1806 and renamed Martim de Freitas, renamed Pedro I, to Brazil 1822

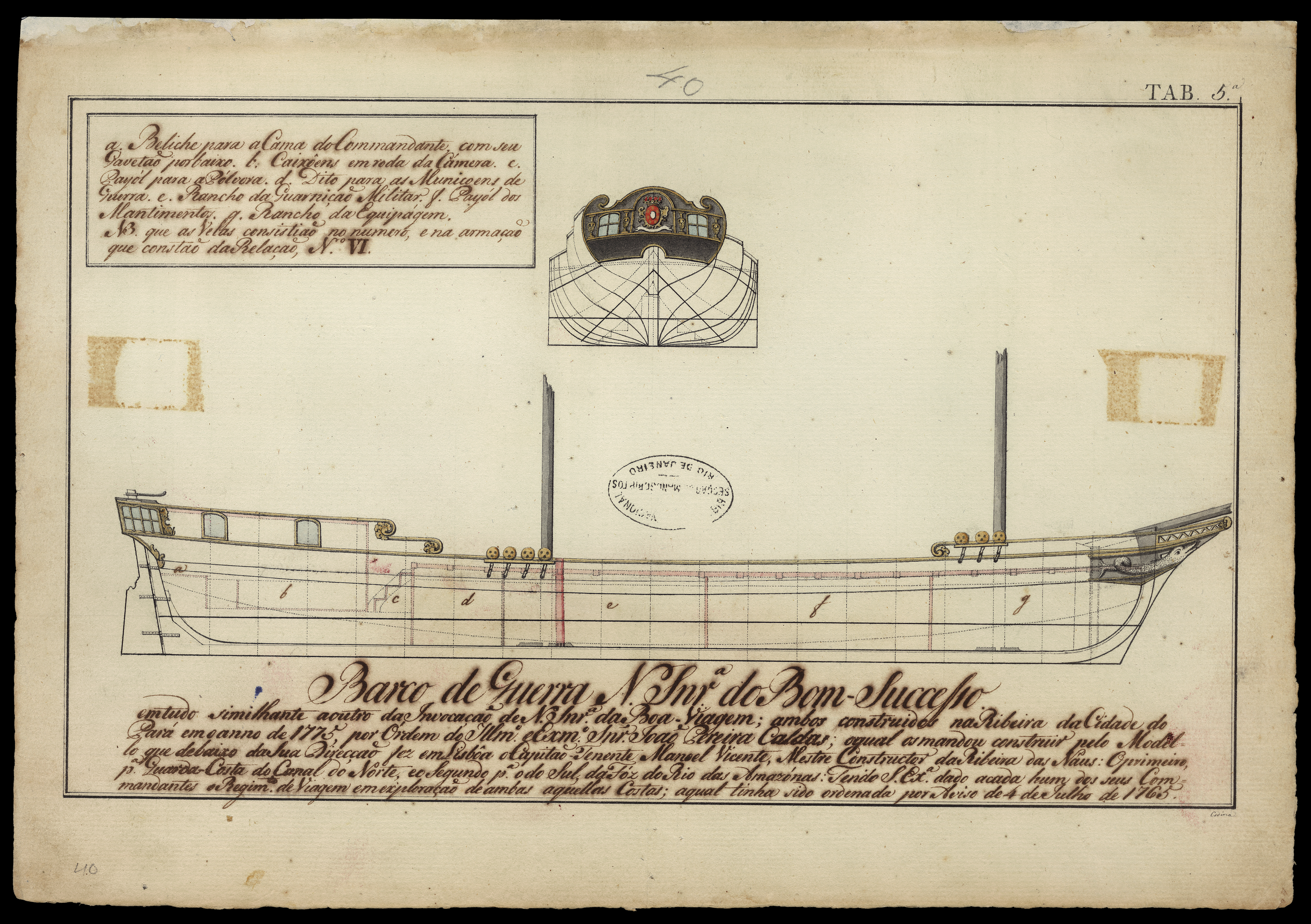
Barco de Guerra N. Snrª do Bom-Sucesso.

- Nossa Senhora do Bom Sucesso 64-72 (c. 1766) - Rebuilt 1800 and renamed Dom João de Castro, to Brazil 1822
- Nossa Senhora de Belém e São José 54 (c. 1766) - BU 1805
- São Sebastião 64 (c. 1767) - BU 1832
- Nossa Senhora dos Prazeres 62-64 (c. 1767) - Rebuilt and renamed Afonso de Albuquerque 1796/97, to Brazil 1822
- Nossa Senhora da Conceição 90 (1771) - Rebuilt and renamed Príncipe Real 1794; to Brazil 1822
- Santo Agostinho 72 (ex-Spanish San Agustin 74, captured 1776/77) - Returned 1777
- Nossa Senhora do Monte do Carmo 68-74 (c. 1786) - Rebuilt and renamed Medusa 1793, to Brazil 1822?
- Coração de Jesus 72-74 (c. 1789) - Rebuilt, renamed Maria I 1793, captured by France 1807, returned c. 1809, wrecked 1810
- Rainha de Portugal 74 (c. 1791) - Rebuilt and renamed Cabo de São Vicente 1833, discarded 1848?
- Vasco da Gama 74-80 (c. 1792) - To Brazil 1822
- Príncipe do Brazil 74 (c. 1802) - BU 1826?
- Dom João Sexto 74 (c. 1816) - Renamed Nossa Senhora dos Mártires e de São João, Príncipe Regente, BU 1852
- Vasco da Gama 74-80 (c. 1841) - Discarded 1873?
- Assunção 66/70
- São Sebastião 74
- Santa Teresa 50 - renamed Thetis
- Santo António 70
- Golfinho 44
- Amazónia 50
- Pérola 44
- Tritão 44

==== Frigates from 1700 ====
- Nossa Senhora da Graça (1787), also known as Fénix, launched 1787, burned 1819

=== Steam-screw warships ===
- Sagres 14 (1858)
- Bartolomeu Dias 28 (1858)
- Estefânia 28 (1859)
- Sá da Bandeira 13 (1862)
- Duque da Terceira 13 (1864)
- Vasco da Gama (1876) - a coast defence battleship

Pátria

Afonso de Albuquerque

== 1807 Fleet ==
The following is a list of the Portuguese warships which were lying in the Tagus River, Lisbon, when Lord St Vincent was there in September 1806:

Ship	Guns	State
Príncipe Real	84	Lower masts rigged, and the lower yards are across.
Príncipe do Brazil	84
Rainha de Portugal	74
Afonso de Albuquerque	74	Lower masts rigged, top-masts up, and down the lower masts, jib-booms on the bowsprit, cables bent to the spare anchors: appear to have their ballast on board.
Princesa da Beira	64
Infante Dom Pedro	74
Medusa	74
Belém	64
D. Maria I	74
São Sebastião*	74
Name unknown	74
Name unknown	74
Santo António	70	In dock 7 years and 3 months
Príncipe Regente	74	Building
Teresa	50	Lower masts rigged, and jib-boom on the bowsprit; just caulked
Golfinho	44
Amazónia	50
Pérola	50	Lower masts rigged, and the topmasts up, and down the masts; anchors on board, and one cable bent
Active	36
Princesa de Abiena	36
Andorinha	32
Vénus	36	Repairing, and preparing to heave down
Ulisses	36
Real Fonsor	28	Just repairing, and fitting
BoaVentura	16	Caulking
Serpente	22	Lower masts rigged; anchors and cables on board
Diligente	22
Gaivota	22
Real Fonza	16
Fereta (schooner)	8	Fitting for sea (new)
Benjamim	22	Corvette (French)
Tritão	44	Lower masts rigged, topmasts and spars on board; just caulked

N.B. One 74-gun ship sailed the latter end of August, and Rainha de Portugal arrived. These ships, in general, were said to be in good repair; and as to construction, equal, if not superior to the British.

Source: Nautical Chronicle, Vol. 18 (1807), pp 229–330, The Maritime History Virtual Archives

== 1808–1899 commissions ==
The following is a list of the Portuguese warships by type commissioned between 1808 and 1899

#	Ship name	Commission	State
=== Cruisers ===
	Rainha Dona Amélia	1899-1924	Small cruiser for colonial service; renamed República in 1910
	Vasco da Gama	1878-1935	
	Adamastor	1897-1933	
	São Gabriel	1898-1924	
	São Rafael	1898-1911	
	Dom Carlos I (cruiser)		

=== Gunboats ===
- Zaire
- Mandovi

== 1900–2020 commissions ==
The following is a list of the Portuguese warships by type commissioned between 1900 and 2020

#	Ship name	Commission	State
=== Avisos ===
	Carvalho Araújo	1915–59	British Arabis-class sloop
	República	1915–39	British Arabis-class sloop
F 475	Gonçalo Velho	1933–61	Gonçalo Velho class (2nd rate aviso)
F 476	Gonçalves Zarco	1933–64	Gonçalo Velho class (2nd rate aviso)
F 470	Afonso de Albuquerque	1935–61	Afonso de Albuquerque class (1st rate aviso)
F 471	Bartolomeu Dias	1935–67	Afonso de Albuquerque class (1st rate aviso)
A 528	Pedro Nunes	1935–76	Pedro Nunes class (2nd rate aviso)
F 477, A 5200	João de Lisboa	1937–66	Pedro Nunes class (2nd rate aviso)
=== Corvettes ===
A524	Carvalho Araújo	1959–75	British Flower-class corvette; used as an hydrographic survey vessel; ex-HMS Chrysanthemum, ex-FFL Commandant Drogou, ex-Terje X
	Bengo	1948–48	Canadian Flower-class corvette ex-HMCS Whitby. Transferred to Mozambique as a pilot tender with the same name. Fate unknown.
A527	Almeida Carvalho	1950–71	Converted British Bangor-class minesweeper used as an hydrographic survey vessel; ex-HMCS Fort York
F470	Cacheu	1965–74	Converted British Bangor-class minesweeper; ex-HMCS Caraquet, ex-NRP Almirante Lacerda
F471	António Enes	1971–2026	Decommissioned
F475	João Coutinho	1970–2014	Decommissioned
F476	Jacinto Cândido	1970–2018	Decommissioned
F477	General Pereira d'Eça	1970–2016	Sunk as artificial reef 13 July 2016
F484	Augusto Castilho	1970–2003	Decommissioned
F485	Honório Barreto	1971–2002	Decommissioned
F486	Baptista de Andrade	1974–2017	Decommissioned
F487	João Roby	1975–2026	Decommissioned
F488	Afonso Cerqueira	1975–2015	Sunk as artificial reef 4 September 2018
F489	Oliveira e Carmo	1975–2001	Decommissioned, sunk as artificial reef 30 October 2012
=== Destroyers ===
T	Tejo	1904–27	Scrapped 1927
L	Liz	1914–14	Transferred to the Royal Navy (31 May 1915) and was renamed HMS Arno; sunk 1918 in collision with the destroyer HMS Hope
G	Guadiana	1913–34	Scrapped, 1934-36
D	Douro	1914–31	Scrapped, 1931
TA	Tamega	1922–45	Scrapped, 1945
V	Vouga	1920–31	Sunk March 1931
D334 (ex V)	Vouga	1933–67	Scrapped, 1967
D333 (ex L)	Lima	1933–65	Scrapped, 1965
D331 (ex D)	Dão	1935–60	Scrapped, 1961
D335 (ex T)	Tejo	1935–65	Scrapped, 1965
D332 (ex DR)	Douro	1936–59	Scrapped, 1960
=== Frigates ===
F332	Nuno Tristão	1945–70	British River-class frigate; ex-HMS Avon; scrapped
F331	Diogo Gomes	1949–68	British River-class frigate; ex-HMS Awe; scrapped
F333	Diogo Cão	1957–68	US John C. Butler-class destroyer escort, classified as frigate; ex-USS Formoe (DE-509); scrapped
F334	Corte Real	1957–68	US John C. Butler-class destroyer escort, classified as frigate; ex-USS McCoy Reynolds (DE-440); scrapped
F335; DE 1032(US)	Pêro Escobar	1957–75	Based on the Italian design Almirante Clemente-class destroyer, classified as frigate; Ordered and bought by the US for Portugal; scrapped
F336	Álvares Cabral	1959–71	British Bay-class frigate; ex-HMS Burghead Bay; scrapped
F337	Pacheco Pereira	1959–70	British Bay-class frigate; ex-HMS Bigbury Bay; scrapped
F479	Dom Francisco de Almeida	1961–70	British Bay-class frigate; ex-HMS Morecambe Bay; scrapped
F478	Vasco da Gama	1961–71	British Bay-class frigate; ex-HMS Mounts Bay; scrapped
F472; DE 1039	Almirante Pereira da Silva	1963–89	Although officially decommissioned only in 1989, it was inoperative from the early 1980s; scrapped at Alhos Vedros
F473	Almirante Gago Coutinho	1967–89	Although officially decommissioned only in 1989, it was inoperative since the early 1980s; scrapped at Alhos Vedros
F474	Almirante Magalhães Correia	1968–89	Operative until mid-1980s, although very seldom used; scrapped at Alhos Vedros
F480	Comandante João Belo	1966–2008	Sold to Uruguay and officially transferred April 2008, as ROU-1 Uruguay, in service Uruguayan Navy
F482	Comandante Roberto Ivens	1968–98	Collided in 1995 with the Canadian AOR Preserver; wrecked; scrapped at Alhos Vedros
F481	Comandante Hermenegildo Capelo	1968–2004	Decommissioned April 2004; moored at Lisbon Naval Base; scuttled as artificial reef 15 June 2013
F483	Comandante Sacadura Cabral	1969–2008	Sold to Uruguay and officially transferred April 2008, as ROU-2 Cte Pedro Campbell, in service Uruguayan Navy
F330	Vasco da Gama	1991–	Being upgraded.
F331	Álvares Cabral	1991–	In service
F332	Corte-Real	1992–	In service
F333	Bartolomeu Dias	2009–	In service - Dutch Karel Doorman class; Ex HNLMS Van Nes - F833
F334	Dom Francisco de Almeida	2010–	In service - Dutch Karel Doorman class; Ex HNLMS Van Galen - F834
=== Patrol boats ===
P-1140	Cacine	1969–?	Decommissioned
P-1141	Cunene		Scrapped
P-1142	Mandovi		Scrapped
P-1143	Rovuma		Scrapped
P-1144	Cuanza	1970–?	Decommissioned
P-1145	Geba		Decommissioned 2005; sunk in missile exercise 21 June 2008
P-1146	Zaire	1971–	In service
P-1147	Zambeze		Sunk as artificial reef 30 October 2012
P-1150	Argos	1991–	In service
P-1151	Dragão	1991–	In service
P-1152	Escorpião	1991–	In service
P-1153	Cassiopeia	1991–	In service
P-1154	Hidra	1991–	In service
P-1155	Centauro	2000–	In service
P-1156	Orion	2001–	In service
P-1157	Pégaso	2001–	In service
P-1158	Sagitário	2001–	In service
P-1160	Limpopo		Sunk in a missile exercise 4 May 2006
P-1161	Save	1973–2010	Decommissioned, moored at Lisbon Naval Base, to be scrapped
P-360	Viana do Castelo	2011–	In service
P-361	Figueira da Foz	2013–	In service
P-362	Sines	2018–	In service
P-363	Setúbal	2018–	In service
P-590	Tejo	2015–	In service; Danish Flyvefisken-class patrol vessel; ex-Viben - P562. Sold in 2026 to Dominican Republic.
P-591	Douro	2015–	In service; Danish Flyvefisken-class patrol vessel; ex-Ravnen - P560. Sold in 2026 to Dominican Republic.
P-592	Mondego	2015–	In service; Danish Flyvefisken-class patrol vessel; ex-Glenten - P557. Sold in 2026 to Dominican Republic.
P-593	Guadiana	2015–	In service; Danish Flyvefisken-class patrol vessel; ex-Skaden - P561. Sold in 2026 to Dominican Republic.
=== Gunboats ===
	Pátria	1909-1930	Built in Lisbon and completed in 1905. Served in Africa and transferred to Macau in 1909. Decommissioned in 1930.
	Macau	1909-1943	Small shallow-draught acquired in pieces from Yarrow, Scotstoun and completed and launched 1909. Sold to Japan 1943 and renamed Maiko. After war became Republic of China Navy boat Wu Feng and then by PLAN until 1968.
	Limpopo (gunboat)	1890–1943	
=== Submarines ===
E	Espadarte	1913–28	Scrapped
F	Foca	1917–34	Italian F-class submarine; Foca class in Portuguese service; scrapped
G	Golfinho	1917–34	Italian F-class submarine; Foca class in Portuguese service; scrapped
H	Hidra	1917–35	Italian F-class submarine; Foca class in Portuguese service; scrapped
D	Delfim	1934–50	Delfim class; scrapped
E	Espadarte	1935–50	Delfim class; scrapped
G	Golfinho	1935–50	Delfim class; scrapped
S160	Narval	1948–69	British S-class submarine; Narval or Neptuno class in Portuguese service; ex-HMS Spur; scrapped
S161	Nautilo	1948–69	British S-class submarine; Narval or Neptuno class in Portuguese service; ex-HMS Saga; scrapped
S162	Neptuno	1948–67	British S-class submarine; Narval or Neptuno class in Portuguese service; ex-HMS Spearhead; scrapped
S163	Albacora	1967–2000	Albacora class. Moored at Lisbon Naval Base and used for spare parts (cannibalized); sold for scrap in 2011 at Alhos Vedros shipyard
S164	Barracuda	1968–2010	Albacora class. Decommissioned in 2010. Placed in dry dock in Almada in 2013 and converted to a museum ship open to the public as of 2024.
S165	Cachalote	1968–75	Albacora class. Sold to Pakistan in 1975, renamed Ghazi
S166	Delfim	1969–2005	Albacora class. Converted to a museum ship, will be placed at Viana do Castelo, in 2008?
S167	Tridente	2010–	Tridente class. In service
S168	NRP S168	2010–	Tridente class. In service
=== Torpedo boats ===
1	Nº1	1881–1929	
2	Nº2	1886–1921	
3	Nº3	1886–1921	
4	Nº4	1886–1921	
A	Ave	1921–40	Ex. "86 F L" of the Austro-Hungarian Navy, transferred to Portugal as reparation for World War I
L	Liz	1921–34	Ex. "90 F L" of the Austro-Hungarian Navy, transferred to Portugal as reparation for World War I
S	Sado	1921–40	Ex. "89 F L" of the Austro-Hungarian Navy, transferred to Portugal as reparation for World War I
M	Mondego	1921–38	Ex. "91 F M" of the Austro-Hungarian Navy, transferred to Portugal as reparation for World War I
C	Cávado	1921–21	Ex. "88 F C" of the Austro-Hungarian Navy, transferred to Portugal as reparation for World War I; Sank on the Moroccan coast while being towed by the Patrão Lopes
Z	Zêzere	1921–21	Ex. "85 F Z" of the Austro-Hungarian Navy, transferred to Portugal as reparation for World War I; Sank on the Moroccan coast while being towed by NRP Patrão Lopes
#	Ship name	Commission	State

== Future Developments ==
The following are ships that are being built or that will be transferred to the Portuguese Navy:

- 3 FREMM EVO multipurpose frigates to be built by Fincantieri.
- 6 Viana do Castelo-class patrol vessel being built by West Sea Shipyard (Portugal).
- 8 Patrol boats developed between Portuguese Navy and TVera Navis.
- 2 Replenishment oiler being built by STM.
- 1 Landing platform being built by Damen Group.
- 1 Amphibious transport dock based on HNLMS Rotterdam called "Navio Polivalente Logístico".

== See also ==
- List of active Portuguese Navy ships
- Portuguese Navy
- Military history of Portugal
