= NRP Delfim (D) =

Portuguese Navy submarine of 1934–1950

Delfim

History

Portugal
- Name: Delfim
- Namesake: Dolphin
- Builder: Vickers-Armstrongs, Barrow-in-Furness, England, United Kingdom
- Laid down: 9 March 1933
- Launched: 1 May 1934
- Commissioned: 16 December 1934
- Decommissioned: 14 November 1950
- Stricken: 29 May 1953
- Identification: Pennant D
- Fate: Scrapped

General characteristics
- Class & type: Delfim-class submarine
- Displacement: 800 long tons (813 t) (surfaced); 1,092 long tons (1,110 t) (submerged)
- Length: 69.23 m (227 ft 2 in)
- Beam: 6.50 m (21 ft 4 in)
- Draught: 3.86 m (12 ft 8 in)
- Propulsion: 2 × Vickers diesel engines, 2,300 bhp (1,715 kW); 2 × electric motors, 1,000 shp (746 kW); 2 x shafts
- Speed: 16.5 knots (30.6 km/h; 19.0 mph) (surfaced); 9.25 knots (17.13 km/h; 10.64 mph) (submerged)
- Range: 5,000 nmi (9,300 km; 5,800 mi) at 10 knots (19 km/h; 12 mph) (surfaced); 2,000 nmi (3,700 km; 2,300 mi) at 16.5 knots (30.6 km/h; 19.0 mph) (surfaced); 110 nmi (200 km; 130 mi) at 4 knots (7.4 km/h; 4.6 mph) (submerged); 8 nmi (15 km; 9.2 mi) at 9.25 knots (17.13 km/h; 10.64 mph) (submerged)
- Complement: 36
- Armament: 2 × 533 mm (21 in) torpedo tubes (4 bow, 2 stern); 12 x torpedoes; 1 × 4 in (102 mm) deck gun; 2 x machine guns
- Notes: SOURCE:

Delfim was the lead ship of the Delfim-class submarines built in the United Kingdom for Portugal in the 1930s. She was in commission in the Portuguese Navy from 1934 to 1950.

== Construction and commissioning ==
Delfim is launched at Barrow-in-Furness, England, on 1 May 1934.

By the late 1920s, the Portuguese Navy had decommissioned its first submarine, Espadarte, and its remaining submarine force — the 1st Submarine Squadron, which consisted of the three aging vessels of the Foca class — was in such poor material condition that its submarines no longer could operate except in protected coastal waters under controlled conditions. To replace the 1st Submarine Squadron and address the obsolescence and decreasing operability of its submarine force, the Portuguese Navy's 1930 naval program — designed by Minister of the Navy Contra-almirante (Counter Admiral) Luís Magalhães Correia — included three new submarines of the Delfim class.

Vickers-Armstrongs laid down Delfim on 9 March 1933 at its shipyard at Barrow-in-Furness, England, in the United Kingdom. She was launched on 1 May 1934 and was commissioned on 16 December 1934.

== Service history ==
Within a month of commissioning, Delfim made her delivery voyage from the United Kingdom to Portugal. When she arrived on 15 January 1935 — the first Delfim-class vessel to reach Portugal — the submarine Hidra got underway from Lisbon and met her off Cabo Raso. In a symbolic passing of the torch from the Portuguese Navy's oldest submarine to its newest, Hidra′s crew rendered honors to Delfim and exchanged formal maritime greetings with Delfim′s crew. Hidra then joined five Portuguese Navy seaplanes and a fleet of recreational boats in escorting Delfim up the Tagus to the submarine base at the Belém Dock in the Belém district of Lisbon, where Delfim moored to a buoy at 16:10.

Delfim′s sister ships Espadarte and Golfinho soon arrived in Portugal from the United Kingdom as well. They formed the 2nd Submarine Squadron, replacing the 1st Submarine Squadron, whose three Foca-class submarines were retired in late 1934 and 1935 and scrapped. In June 1935, the Portuguese Navy's Naval Training Division conducted maneuvers in the Azores and in the Madeira Islands that involved all three Delfim-class submarines and the destroyers Dão, Lima, and Vouga.

All three Delfim-class submarines were in port at Lisbon on 8 September 1936 when a mutiny occurred among sailors aboard Dão and the aviso Afonso de Albuquerque who wished to steam their ships to a port in Spain and offer them to the Republican faction for use in the ongoing Spanish Civil War. Minister of the Navy Manuel Ortins de Bettencourt ordered the coastal fortifications at Lisbon and the warships at the base to prevent the two ships from leaving port, and the ships came under heavy fire when the mutineers attempted to reach the open sea. An unidentified Delfim-class submarine opened fire on Afonso de Albuquerque with a machine gun, and some of the bullets passed near the British ocean liner RMS Strathmore, which had hundreds of British tourists aboard, but no one was injured aboard Strathmore. Neither of the mutinous Portuguese warships succeeded in leaving port, and the mutiny was put down.

Delfim visited the Madeira Islands and the Azores several times. On 23 April 1937 she rescued a Portuguese Navy pilot whose seaplane had crashed in the Atlantic Ocean off Cascais. She visited the new Lisbon Naval Base, also referred to as the "Alfeite Naval Base," for the first time on 3 May 1939. In 1940, she left the Belém Dock and the Lisbon Naval Base became her new base.

World War II began with the German invasion of Poland on 1 September 1939. Portugal maintained its neutrality during the war. This limited Delfim, Espadarte, and Golfinho to conducting exercises off the Portuguese coast until the end of the war in Europe in May 1945.

In 1949 and 1950, Delfim participated in exercises with the British S-class submarines — known in the Portuguese Navy as the Narval class, but also often referred to as the Neptuno class — which the Portuguese Navy had acquired from the United Kingdom in 1948. In October 1950, Delfim spent six days conducting daily crew training sorties from Setúbal, and upon completing them made her last voyage, proceeding from Setúbal to Lisbon on 18 October 1950.

All three Delfim-class submarines were decommissioned at Lisbon on 14 November 1950. Delfim was stricken from the navy list on 29 May 1953 and subsequently was scrapped.
