= List of ship launches in 1934 =

The list of ship launches in 1934 includes a chronological list of some ships launched in 1934.

	Ship	Class	Builder	Location	Country	Notes
18 January	Skipjack	Halcyon-class minesweeper	John Brown & Company	Clydebank	United Kingdom	For Royal Navy
30 January	Escapade	E-class destroyer	Scotts Shipbuilding & Engineering Company	Greenock	United Kingdom	For Royal Navy
7 February	Exmouth	E-class destroyer	HM Dockyard	Portsmouth	United Kingdom	For Royal Navy
15 February	Electra	E-class destroyer	Hawthorn Leslie and Company	Hebburn	United Kingdom	For Royal Navy
16 February	Echo	E-class destroyer	William Denny & Brothers	Dumbarton	United Kingdom	For Royal Navy
1 March	Ajax	Leander-class cruiser	Vickers Armstrong	Barrow-in-Furness	United Kingdom	For Royal Navy
11 March	Krischan	Krischan-class seaplane tender	Norderwerft Koser und Meyer	Hamburg	Germany	For the Luftwaffe
15 March	Twickenham Ferry	Train Ferry	Swan Hunter & Wigham Richardson Ltd	Newcastle upon Tyne	United Kingdom	For the Southern Railway
19 March	Esk	E-class destroyer	Swan Hunter & Wigham Richardson Ltd	Wallsend	United Kingdom	For Royal Navy
29 March	Encounter	E-class destroyer	Hawthorn Leslie and Company	Hebburn	United Kingdom	For Royal Navy
29 March	Escort	E-class destroyer	Scotts Shipbuilding & Engineering Company	Greenock	United Kingdom	For Royal Navy
12 April	Eclipse	E-class destroyer	William Denny & Brothers	Dumbarton	United Kingdom	For Royal Navy
17 April	Harrier	Halcyon-class minesweeper	John I. Thornycroft & Company	Southampton	United Kingdom	For Royal Navy
1 May	NRP Delfim	Delfim-class submarine	Vickers-Armstrongs	Barrow-in-Furness	United Kingdom	For Portuguese Navy.
1 May	Waiwera	Refrigerated cargo ship	Harland & Wolff	Belfast	United Kingdom	For Shaw Savill Line.
9 May	Idalia	Motor yacht	Harland & Wolff	Belfast	United Kingdom	For Alan F. Craig.
12 May	Fearless	F-class destroyer	Cammell Laird	Birkenhead	United Kingdom	For Royal Navy
29 May	Express	E-class destroyer	Swan Hunter & Wigham Richardson Ltd	Tyne and Wear	United Kingdom	For Royal Navy
30 May	NRP Espadarte	Delfim-class submarine	Vickers-Armstrongs	Barrow-in-Furness	United Kingdom	For Portuguese Navy.
30 May	NRP Golfinho	Delfim-class submarine	Vickers-Armstrongs	Barrow-in-Furness	United Kingdom	For Portuguese Navy.
8 June	August Bösch	Fishing trawler	H. C. Stülcken Sohn	Hamburg	Germany	For C. C. H. Bösch
12 June	Faulknor	F-class destroyer	Yarrow Shipbuilders	Scotstoun, Glasgow	United Kingdom	For Royal Navy
14 June	Sir Hastings Anderson	Target towing ship	Harland & Wolff	Belfast	United Kingdom	For Royal Navy.
28 June	Fame	F-class destroyer	Parsons	Wallsend	United Kingdom	For Royal Navy
28 June	Firedrake	F-class destroyer	Parsons	Wallsend	United Kingdom	For Royal Navy
28 June	Forester	F-class destroyer	J. Samuel White	Cowes	United Kingdom	For Royal Navy
28 June	Waipawa	Refrigerated cargo ship	Harland & Wolff	Belfast	United Kingdom	For Shaw Savill Line.
29 June	Foresight	F-class destroyer	Cammell Laird	Birkenhead	United Kingdom	For Royal Navy
30 June	Admiral Graf Spee	Deutschland-class cruiser	Reichsmarinewerft	Wilhelmshaven	Germany	For Reichsmarine
11 July	Germania	Fishing trawler	Howaldtswerke	Kiel	Germany	For N. Elbing Hochseefischerei AG
26 July	John Dock	Tug	Harland & Wolff	Belfast	United Kingdom	For South African Railways.
27 July	Amphion	Leander-class cruiser	Portsmouth Naval Dockyard	Portsmouth	United Kingdom	For Royal Navy
July	Deutschland	Fishing trawler	Deschimag Seebeckwerft	Wesermünde	Germany	For Hanseatische Hochseefischerei AG
16 August	Loch Lomond	Cargo ship	Harland & Wolff	Belfast	United Kingdom	For MacLay & MacIntyre Ltd.
20 August	Flying Falcon	Tug	Harland & Wolff	Belfast	United Kingdom	For Clyde Shipping Co.
27 August	Hussar	Halcyon-class minesweeper	John I. Thornycroft & Company	Southampton	United Kingdom	For Royal Navy
28 August	W. H. Fuller	Tug	Harland & Wolff	Belfast	United Kingdom	For South African Railways.
29 August	Fortune	F-class destroyer	John Brown and Company	Clydebank, Scotland	United Kingdom	For Royal Navy
10 September	Fury	F-class destroyer	J. Samuel White	Cowes	United Kingdom	For Royal Navy
22 September	Sydney	Leander-class cruiser	Swan Hunter & Wigham Richardson Ltd	Wallsend-on-Tyne	United Kingdom	For Royal Australian Navy
26 September	Queen Mary	Ocean liner	John Brown and Company	Clydebank, Scotland	United Kingdom	For Cunard Line
September	Haltenbank	Fishing trawler	Deschimag Seebeckwerft	Wesermünde	Germany	For Norddeutsche Hochseefischerei AG.
6 October	Hinrich Hey	Fishing trawler	Norderwerft Köser & Mayer	Hamburg	Germany	For Julius H. Fock & Hans J. M. Pickenpack
6 October	J. Hinrich Wilhelms	Fishing trawler	Deschimag Seebeckwerft	Wesermünde	Germany	For Hochseefischerei Carl Kämpf Partenreederei
9 October	Ancylus	Tanker	Swan, Hunter & Wigham Richardson Ltd.	Newcastle upon Tyen	United Kingdom	For Anglo-Saxon Petroleum Co. Ltd.
9 October	Imperial Star	Refrigerated cargo ship	Harland & Wolff	Belfast	United Kingdom	For Blue Star Line.
9 October	Wairangi	Refrigerated cargo ship	Harland & Wolff	Belfast	United Kingdom	For Shaw Savill Line.
10 October	Ro-33	Kaichū VI-type submarine	Kure Naval Arsenal	Kure	Japan	For Imperial Japanese Navy
11 October	Henzada	Cargo ship	Harland & Wolff	Belfast	United Kingdom	For P Henderson & Co.
12 October	Foxhound	F-class destroyer	John Brown and Company	Clydebank, Scotland	United Kingdom	For Royal Navy
16 October	Zieten	Fishing trawler	Bremer Vulkan	Bremen	Germany	For Hochseefischerei F. A. Pust
23 October	Shepperton Ferry	Train Ferry	Swan Hunter & Wigham Richardson Ltd	Newcastle upon Tyne	United Kingdom	For the Southern Railway
7 November	Friedrich Busse	Fishing trawler	Bremer Vulkan	Vegesack	Germany	For Hochseefischerei F. Busse
8 November	Martaban	Cargo ship	Harland & Wolff	Belfast	United Kingdom	For P Henderson & Co.
22 November	New Zealand Star	Refrigerated cargo ship	Harland & Wolff	Belfast	United Kingdom	For Blue Star Line.
24 November	Acavus	Yanker	Workman, Clark Ltd.	Belfast	United Kingdom	For Anglo-Saxon Petroleum Co. Ltd.
1 December	Gadila	Tanker	Howaldtswerke-Deutsche Werft.	Kiel	Germany	For N.V. Petroleum Maatschappij La Corona.
6 December	Nürnberg	Leipzig-class cruiser	Deutsche Werke	Kiel	Germany	For Reichsmarine
6 December	Sfax	Redoutable-class submarine	Ateliers et Chantiers de la Loire	Saint-Nazaire	France	For French Navy
8 December	Amastra	Tanker	Lithgows Ltd.	Port Glasgow	United Kingdom	For Anglo-Saxon Petroleum Co. Ltd.
10 December	Baron Cawdor	Cargo ship	Harland & Wolff	Belfast	United Kingdom	For H. Hogarth & Sons.
15 December	Grille	Aviso	Blohm + Voss	Hamburg	Germany	For Reichsmarine
19 December	Anadara	Tanker	Harland & Wolff	Belfast	United Kingdom	For Anglo-Saxon Petroleum Co.
19 December	Piłsudski	Ocean liner	CRDA yard	Monfalcone, Italy	Poland	For PTTO
20 December	Alexia	Tanker	Bremer Vulkan.	Vegesack	Germany	For Anglo-Saxon Petroleum Co. Ltd.
20 December	Roslin Castle	Refrigerated cargo ship	Harland & Wolff	Belfast	United Kingdom	For Union-Castle Line.
20 December	Triaster	Cargo Liner	Lithgows	Port Glasgow	United Kingdom	For the British Phosphates Commissioners
Unknown date	A. G. & P. Co. No. 30	Dredger	Alabama Drydock and Shipbuilding Company	Mobile, Alabama	United States	For Atlantic, Gulf and Pacific Steamship Corporation.
Unknown date	Alabama	Ferry	Alabama Drydock and Shipbuilding Company	Mobile, Alabama	United States	For Alabama Drydock and Shipbuilding Company.
Unknown date	B.H.C. Barge No. 2	Barge	Blyth Dry Docks & Shipbuilding Co. Ltd	Blyth, Northumberland	United Kingdom	For Blyth Harbour Commissioners.
Unknown date	Camroux I	Coaster	James Pollock & Sons	Faversham	United Kingdom	For Newcastle Coal & Shipping Co Ltd.
Unknown date	Eskdene	Cargo ship	Bartram & Sons Ltd	Sunderland	United Kingdom	For Dene Shipmanagement Co. Ltd.
Unknown date	Pelikan	Refrigerated cargo ship	Bremer Vulkan Schiff- und Maschinenbau	Bremen	Germany	For Afrikanische Frucht-Cie AG
Unknown date	Rodney	Tug	Arthur R. Brown Ltd	Wivenhoe	United Kingdom	For private owner.
Unknown date	Rodney II	Tug	Arthur R. Brown Ltd	Wivenhoe	United Kingdom	For W. T. Beaumont & Sons Ltd.
Unknown date	Skylark 9	Motor vessel	J. Bolson & Son Ltd.	Poole	United Kingdom	For J. Bolson & Son Ltd.
Unknown date	Sofia	Cargo ship	Deutsche Werft.	Hamburg	Germany	For private owner.
Unknown date	Sylt	Coastal tanker	Deutsche Werke	Kiel	Germany	For Carl W Hansen Tankschiffs, Hamburg
Unknown date	No. 256	Barge	Alabama Drydock and Shipbuilding Company	Mobile, Alabama	United States	For United States Army Corps of Engineers.
Unknown date	No. 258	Barge	Alabama Drydock and Shipbuilding Company	Mobile, Alabama	United States	For United States Army Corps of Engineers.
Unknown date	No. 271	Barge	Alabama Drydock and Shipbuilding Company	Mobile, Alabama	United States	For United States Army Corps of Engineers.
Unknown date	No. 274	Barge	Alabama Drydock and Shipbuilding Company	Mobile, Alabama	United States	For United States Army Corps of Engineers.
