= NRP Golfinho (1934) =

Portuguese Navy submarine of 1935–1950

Golfinho

History

Portugal
- Name: Golfinho
- Namesake: Dolphin
- Builder: Vickers-Armstrongs, Barrow-in-Furness, England, United Kingdom
- Laid down: 9 March 1933
- Launched: 30 May 1934
- Commissioned: 14 March 1935
- Decommissioned: 14 November 1950
- Stricken: 1952
- Identification: Pennant G
- Fate: Scrapped

General characteristics
- Class & type: Delfim-class submarine
- Displacement: 800 long tons (813 t) (surfaced); 1,092 long tons (1,110 t) (submerged)
- Length: 69.23 m (227 ft 2 in)
- Beam: 6.50 m (21 ft 4 in)
- Draught: 3.86 m (12 ft 8 in)
- Propulsion: 2 × Vickers diesel engines, 2,300 bhp (1,715 kW); 2 × electric motors, 1,000 shp (746 kW); 2 x shafts
- Speed: 16.5 knots (30.6 km/h; 19.0 mph) (surfaced); 9.25 knots (17.13 km/h; 10.64 mph) (submerged)
- Range: 5,000 nmi (9,300 km; 5,800 mi) at 10 knots (19 km/h; 12 mph) (surfaced); 2,000 nmi (3,700 km; 2,300 mi) at 16.5 knots (30.6 km/h; 19.0 mph) (surfaced); 110 nmi (200 km; 130 mi) at 4 knots (7.4 km/h; 4.6 mph) (submerged); 8 nmi (15 km; 9.2 mi) at 9.25 knots (17.13 km/h; 10.64 mph) (submerged)
- Complement: 36
- Armament: 2 × 533 mm (21 in) torpedo tubes (4 bow, 2 stern); 12 x torpedoes; 1 × 4 in (102 mm) deck gun; 2 x machine guns
- Notes: SOURCE:

Golfinho was the third and final Delfim-class submarine built in the United Kingdom for Portugal in the 1930s. She was in commission in the Portuguese Navy from 1935 to 1950. She was the second Portuguese Navy vessel to bear the name.

== Construction and commissioning ==
By the late 1920s, the Portuguese Navy had decommissioned its first submarine, the first Espadarte, and its remaining submarine force — the 1st Submarine Squadron, which consisted of the three aging vessels of the Foca class — was in such poor material condition that its submarines no longer could operate except in protected coastal waters under controlled conditions. To replace the 1st Submarine Squadron and address the obsolescence and decreasing operability of its submarine force, the Portuguese Navy's 1930 naval program — designed by Minister of the Navy Contra-almirante (Counter Admiral) Luís Magalhães Correia — included three new submarines of the Delfim class.

Vickers-Armstrongs laid down Golfinho on 9 March 1933 at its shipyard at Barrow-in-Furness, England, in the United Kingdom. She was launched on 30 May 1934 and was commissioned on 14 March 1935.

== Service history ==
Golfinho′s sister ships Delfim and Espadarte had arrived in January and March 1935, respectively. After Golfinho made her delivery voyage from the United Kingdom to Portugal, mooring at the submarine base at the Belém Dock in the Belém district of Lisbon, she joined them in the 2nd Submarine Squadron, which replaced the 1st Submarine Squadron, whose three Foca-class submarines were retired in late 1934 and 1935 and scrapped. In June 1935, the Portuguese Navy's Naval Training Division conducted maneuvers in the Azores and in the Madeira Islands that involved all three Delfim-class submarines and the destroyers Dão, Lima, and Vouga.

All three Delfim-class submarines were in port at Lisbon on 8 September 1936 when a mutiny occurred among sailors aboard Dão and the aviso Afonso de Albuquerque who wished to steam their ships to a port in Spain and offer them to the Republican faction for use in the ongoing Spanish Civil War. Minister of the Navy Manuel Ortins de Bettencourt ordered the coastal fortifications at Lisbon and the warships at the base to prevent the two ships from leaving port, and the ships came under heavy fire when the mutineers attempted to reach the open sea. Golfinho and Espadarte received orders to prepare to torpedo the two ships if necessary to hoist a "P" flag when they were ready for combat. Golfinho was the first to raise the flag. An unidentified Delfim-class submarine opened fire on Afonso de Albuquerque with a machine gun, and some of the bullets passed near the British ocean liner RMS Strathmore, which had hundreds of British tourists aboard, but no one was injured aboard Strathmore. Neither of the mutinous Portuguese warships succeeded in leaving port, and the mutiny was put down without the submarines firing any torpedoes.

In 1940, the Delfim-class submarines left the Belém Dock and the Lisbon Naval Base, also known as the Alfeite Naval Base, became their new base.

World War II began with the German invasion of Poland on 1 September 1939. Portugal maintained its neutrality during the war. This limited Delfim, Espadarte, and Golfinho to conducting exercises off the Portuguese coast until the end of the war in Europe in May 1945.

All three Delfim-class submarines were decommissioned at Lisbon on 14 November 1950. Golfinho was stricken from the navy list in 1952 and subsequently was scrapped.
