= List of ship decommissionings in 1950 =

The list of ship decommissionings in 1950 is a chronological list of ships decommissioned in 1950. In cases where no official decommissioning ceremony was held, the date of withdrawal from service may be used instead. For ships lost at sea, see list of shipwrecks in 1950 instead.

| | Operator | Ship | Class and type | Fate | Other notes |
|---|---|---|---|---|---|
| 27 January | United States Navy | USS Rendova | Commencement Bay-class escort carrier | Reserve | Recommissioned in 1951 |
| 14 April | United States Navy | USS Bairoko | Commencement Bay-class escort carrier | Reserve | Recommissioned in September 1950 |
| 14 November | Portuguese Navy | NRP Delfim | Delfim-class submarine | Stricken 29 May 1953; scrapped | |
| 14 November | Portuguese Navy | NRP Espadarte | Delfim-class submarine | Stricken 30 November 1954; scrapped | |
| 14 November | Portuguese Navy | NRP Golfinho | Delfim-class submarine | Stricken 1952; scrapped | |
| 16 November | Spanish Navy | Melilla | Vifor-class destroyer | Stricken 1950; sold for scrap | |
| Unknown date | Royal Navy | HMS Maria | Wreck dispersal vessel | Sold | Scrapped June 1951 |
| Unknown date | United States Fish and Wildlife Service | US FWS Penguin | Cargo liner | Damaged by fire 3 June 1950; sold 21 March 1951 | Extant 1957 |
