= List of ship commissionings in 1935 =

The list of ship commissionings in 1935 includes a chronological list of all ships commissioned in 1935.

	Operator	Ship	Flag	Class and type	Pennant	Other notes
24 January	Portuguese Navy	NRP Espadarte		Delfim-class submarine		
28 January	French Navy	Émile Bertin		Light cruiser		
14 March	Portuguese Navy	NRP Golfinho		Delfim-class submarine		
30 March	Imperial Japanese Navy	Yūgure		Hatsuharu-class destroyer		
14 April	Luftwaffe	Krischan II		Krischan-class seaplane tender		
19 April	United States Navy	USS Monaghan (DD-354)		Farragut-class destroyer		
29 June	Kriegsmarine	U-1		Type IIA coastal submarine	U-1	
29 June	Kriegsmarine	U-3		Type IIA coastal submarine	U-3	
18 July	Kriegsmarine	U-7		Type IIB coastal submarine	U-7	
25 July	Kriegsmarine	U-2		Type IIA coastal submarine	U-2	
28 July	Imperial Japanese Navy	Mogami		Mogami-class heavy cruiser		
4 August	Soviet Navy	Shch-307		Shchuka-class submarine		
5 August	Kriegsmarine	U-8		Type IIB coastal submarine	U-8	
7 August	Regia Marina	Muzio Attendolo		Condottieri-class light cruiser		
17 August	Kriegsmarine	U-4		Type IIA coastal submarine	U-4	
21 August	Kriegsmarine	U-9		Type IIB coastal submarine	U-9	
29 August	Imperial Japanese Navy	Mikuma		Mogami-class cruiser heavy cruiser		
31 August	Kriegsmarine	U-5		Type IIA coastal submarine	U-5	
7 September	Kriegsmarine	U-6		Type IIA coastal submarine	U-6	
9 September	Kriegsmarine	U-10		Type IIB coastal submarine	U-10	
21 September	Kriegsmarine	U-11		Type IIB coastal submarine	U-11	
24 September	Royal Australian Navy	HMAS Sydney		Modified Leander-class light cruiser		
30 September	Kriegsmarine	U-12		Type IIB coastal submarine	U-12	
2 November	Kriegsmarine	Nürnberg		Leipzig-class light cruiser		
7 November	Luftwaffe	Krischan III		Krischan-class seaplane tender		
30 November	Kriegsmarine	U-13		Type IIB coastal submarine	U-13	
3 December	Kriegsmarine	U-17		Type IIB coastal submarine	U-17	
15 December	Kriegsmarine	F1		F-class escort ship	F1	
