= NRP Espadarte =

NRP Espadarte may refer to more than one ship of the Portuguese Navy:

- NRP Espadarte (1912), Portugal's first modern submarine, in commission from 1913 to 1928
- NRP Espadarte (1934), a Delfim class submarine in commission from 1935 to 1950
