= NRP Bartolomeu Dias =

NRP Bartolomeu Dias has been the name of more than one Portuguese Navy ship, and may refer to:

- NRP Bartolomeu Dias (1934), an Afonso de Albuquerque-class sloop launched in 1934 and hulked in 1965
- NRP Bartolomeu Dias (F333), formerly the Karel Doorman-class frigate HNLMS Van Nes acquired in 2009
