= RMS Strathmore =

Ocean liner and mail ship

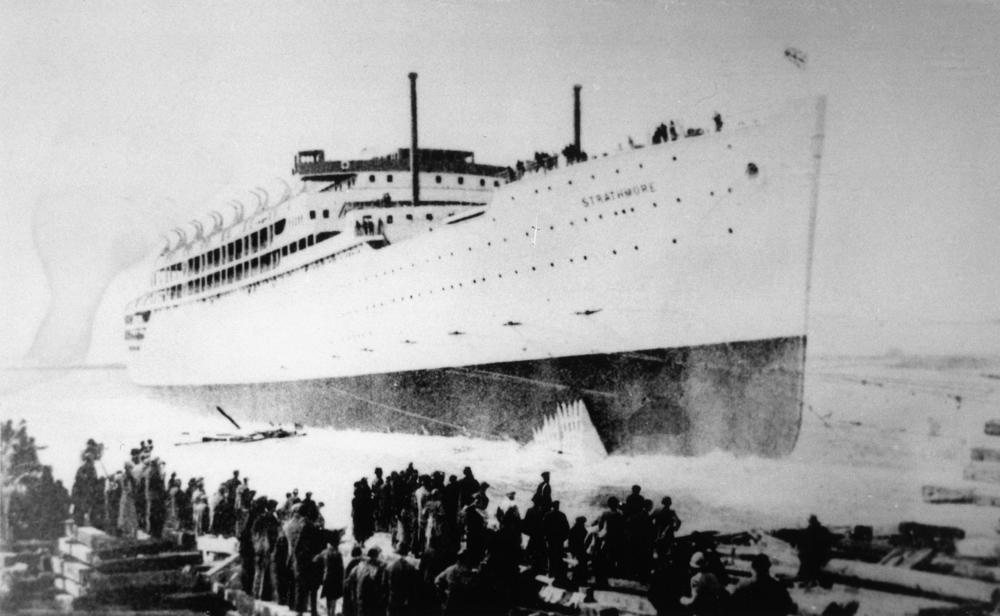
- Launch of RMS Strathmore, 1935

History

United Kingdom
- Name: RMS Strathmore
- Namesake: Strathmore, Angus, in Scotland
- Owner: P&O to 1963, then John S. Latsis
- Operator: P&O Steam Navigation Co to 1963, then Latsis Lines
- Port of registry: (United Kingdom) London
- Builder: Vickers-Armstrongs, Barrow-in-Furness
- Yard number: 698
- Launched: 4 April 1935 by the Duchess of York
- Maiden voyage: 18 September 1935
- In service: 26 October 1935
- Home port: Tilbury
- Identification: UK official number 164521; Call sign GYMS
- Fate: Scrapped at La Spezia, 1969

General characteristics
- Class & type: "Strath" class ocean liner
- Tonnage: 23,428 GRT; 13,151 tonnage under deck; 14,112 NRT
- Length: 640.3 feet (195.2 m)
- Beam: 82.2 feet (25.1 m)
- Installed power: 4,912 NHP
- Sensors & processing systems: direction finding equipment, echo sounding device; gyrocompass

RMS Strathmore was an ocean liner and Royal Mail Ship of P&O, the third of five sister ships built for P&O in the "Strath" class.

Launched in 1935, she served on the company's route from London to India until 1940, when she was requisitioned for war service as a troopship, and redesignated as SS Strathmore, until being returned to her owners in 1948. After a long refit, she resumed service with P&O from 1949 until 1963, when she was sold to Latsis Lines and renamed Marianna Latsi, then Henrietta Latsi, before being laid up in 1967 and scrapped in 1969.

== Class ==
Strathmore joined two sister ships of the "Strath" class, RMS Strathaird and RMS Strathnaver, as Royal Mail Ships, working P&O's regular liner route from Tilbury in England, via British India to Brisbane in Queensland, Australia, and in 1937 they were joined by the final ships of the class, Strathallan and Stratheden. All previous P&O steamships had had black-painted hulls and funnels, but Strathmore and her four sister ships were given white-painted hulls and buff-coloured funnels, earning them the nickname of the "White Sisters", or the "Beautiful White Sisters". They were also known as "the Straths".

== Construction ==
The Vickers-Armstrongs shipyard at Barrow-in-Furness built all five "Strath" class liners. Strathnaver was launched on 5 February 1931, completed in September 1931, and left Tilbury on her maiden voyage on 2 October 1931, with Strathaird following a few months later. Strathmore was launched on 4 April 1935, completed in September, and entered service in October, to remain afloat for more than thirty years.

With gross register tonnage of 23,428 and a maximum speed of twenty knots, Strathmore was then the largest and fastest vessel ever built for P&O. Two further sister ships launched in 1937, Strathallan and Stratheden, were slightly larger, at 23,722 tons each, but also slightly shorter. She had four water-tube boilers and two auxiliary boilers with a combined heating surface of 37,030 square feet (3,440 m^{2}) supplying steam at 425 lb_{f}/in^{2} to two conventional steam turbines with a combined rating of 4,912 NHP. Unlike Strathnaver and Strathaird, which had three funnels of which only the middle one served as a smoke stack, Strathmore gained extra deck space by the removal of the two dummy funnels. Another difference was that the two earlier ships were driven by turbo generators.

On 4 April 1935 the ship was launched by Elizabeth, Duchess of York, one of the daughters of the Earl of Strathmore, soon to become queen.

== With P&O and as a troopship ==
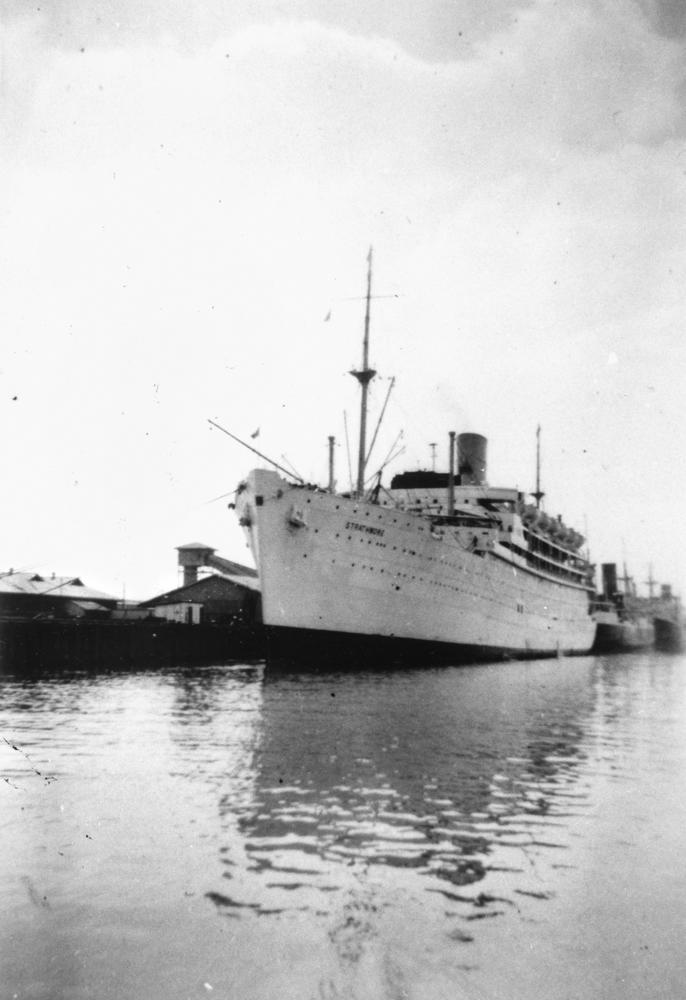
Strathmore in 1955

On her maiden voyage to Bombay in October and November 1935, Strathmore gained the Blue Riband for the route from the Mediterranean to India. In April 1936 she took the new Viceroy of India, the Marquess of Linlithgow, to Bombay with his wife, daughters, and personal staff, and brought home his predecessor, the Marquess of Willingdon. Later in 1936 she took a British-American climbing expedition, including Bill Tilman, Noel Odell, and Charles Snead Houston, to India for the successful first ascent of Nanda Devi.

Strathmore was in port at Lisbon, Portugal, with hundreds of British tourists aboard on 8 September 1936 when a mutiny occurred among sailors aboard the Portuguese Navy destroyer Dão and aviso Afonso de Albuquerque. When the two ships attempted to put to sea, they came under heavy fire from coastal fortifications and an unidentified Delfim-class submarine opened fire on Afonso de Albuquerque with a machine gun while Strathmore′s passengers were at breakfast. Some of the bullets and shells passed near Strathmore, but she suffered no damage and no one aboard her was injured.

In 1938, Strathmore brought the Australian cricket team, including Don Bradman, to England for the 1938 Ashes series. Other notable passengers in the ship's early years included the writer W. Somerset Maugham.

In August 1939, Strathmore set off on a three-week cruise to the eastern Mediterranean, but shortly after she had passed Gibraltar there came an Admiralty signal ordering non-essential British ships to get out of the Mediterranean. The cruise was diverted to Rabat and from there it was intended to proceed to Bermuda, but after only one day at sea there came a signal that war was imminent, and the ship returned to Tilbury, with a blackout being imposed after dark. On 31 March 1940, towards the end of the "Phoney War", the vessel was requisitioned on the orders of the Ministry of Shipping, which later became the Ministry of War Transport, and during the rest of the Second World War she served as a troopship, with no major incidents in that role. On 31 May 1941 she set sail from Gibraltar with approx 1,000 mainly British and other nationals who had arrive at Gibraltar since the evacuation of the civilian population in 1940. On 21 July 1941 Strathmore sailed from Newfoundland carrying 3,800 Canadian soldiers to Britain. In February 1947 she sailed from Southampton bound for Singapore, Hong Kong, and Shanghai, carrying some 2,000 people going to China, including missionaries, colonial police, business men, and their families, many returning home after being displaced by the war.

On 15 May 1948 Strathmore was returned to P&O and in 1948–49 was refitted at Vickers-Armstrong. In October 1949 she again entered service between London and Australia, now with berths for 497 first class passengers and 487 in tourist class. During this period Felicity Kendal travelled to India on the ship, as a small child. She later remembered that "When I was a few months old, Mary was picked to be my ayah from groups of servants lined up on the quayside in Bombay Harbour, waiting to be chosen by the hurrah sahibs and memsahibs as they disembarked from the S.S. Strathmore". On 1 May 1952 the ship, suffering from engine trouble, arrived two days late into Sydney harbour, with the result that 49 angry passengers for New Zealand missed their connection, the Wanganella, which went past Strathmore in the harbour.

In 1954 the ship was again refitted, this time as a single-class ship with 1200 berths, for P&O's migrant and tourist business. In the late 1950s and early 1960s she was sometimes used for short holiday cruises out of London, in between sailings to Australia. In October 1956, while in the Thames estuary, she hit a Norwegian merchant ship, Baalbeck, with some minor damage.

== With Latsis Lines ==
In 1963, the ship was sold to John Spyridon Latsis, a Greek shipowner and owner of Latsis Lines, and arrived at Piraeus in November 1963, to be renamed the Marianna Latsi, in honour of one of the new owner's daughters. In 1964 Latsis also bought her sister ship, Stratheden, which became the Henrietta Latsi. Both were used between March and May of each year for pilgrim voyages from West and North Africa to Jeddah, but otherwise remained at anchor, sometimes remaining in port to be used as hotel ships. In 1966 their new names were swapped over, so that the former Strathmore became the Henrietta Latsi and the former Stratheden took over the name of Marianna Latsi. In 1967 both ships were laid up at Eleusis in Greece, then in May 1969 they were scrapped almost side by side at La Spezia, Italy.
