= NRP Afonso de Albuquerque =

NRP Afonso de Albuquerque is the name of the following ships of the Portuguese Navy:

- NRP Afonso de Albuquerque (1884)
- NRP Afonso de Albuquerque (1934)
- NRP Afonso de Albuquerque (A526)
