= São Gabriel-class cruiser =

Portuguese São Gabriel-class ships from the 20th century

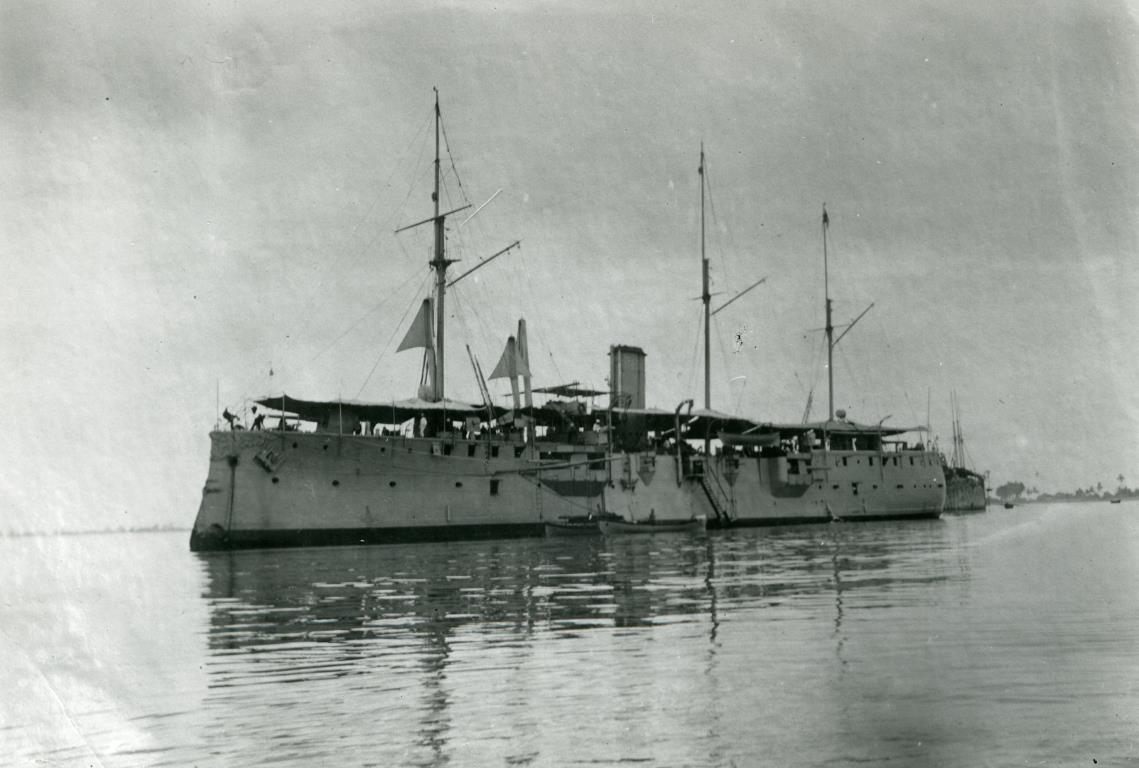
- São Gabriel

Class overview
- Name: São Gabriel class
- Builders: Forges et Chantiers de la Méditerranée, Le Havre
- Operators: Portuguese Navy
- Built: 1897
- In commission: 1898–1924
- Completed: 2
- Lost: 1
- Scrapped: 1

General characteristics
- Type: Protected cruiser
- Displacement: 1,743 long tons (1,771 t)
- Length: 73.78 m (242 ft 1 in)
- Beam: 10.82 m (35 ft 6 in)
- Draught: 4.34 m (14 ft 3 in)
- Propulsion: 4,000 shp (3,000 kW)
- Speed: 17.5 knots (32.4 km/h; 20.1 mph)
- Complement: 242 officers and enlisted
- Armament: 2 x 150 mm (6 in) guns; 2 x 120 mm (5 in) guns; 8 x 47 mm (2 in) guns; 2 x 37 mm (1 in) guns; 1 x 35 cm (14 in) torpedo tube

The São Gabriel class was a pair of protected cruisers that served in the Portuguese Navy. The two ships of the class, São Gabriel and São Rafael, were known as the "Angels" (Portuguese: Anjos).

The names of the cruisers were inspired by the Portuguese explorer Vasco Da Gama's twin command carracks (São Gabriel and São Rafael) that took part in the discovery of the sea route to India.

== Background ==
The ships were ordered from the French shipyards of Forges et Chantiers de la Méditerranée in Le Havre, and built as part of the Portuguese Navy's refit program at the end of the 19th century. They were the first Portuguese ships that were installed with a wireless telegraphy communications system, which São Gabriel later tested on 11 December 1909, as she steamed away from Lisbon at 1530 in the afternoon and established telegraphic contact with the radiotelegraph post in Vale de Zebro.

== Service ==
As the 390th anniversary of Ferdinand Magellan's first circumnavigation voyage was approaching. The Minister of the Navy decided that São Gabriel would be sent around the globe on a solo cruise to mark the special occasion. She left on 11 December, the same day she tested out her newly fitted wireless communication technology, and returned home on 19 April 1911, stopping at 72 ports and travelling approximately 42,000 nautical miles (78,000 km; 48,000 mi). São Gabriel became the first modern Portuguese ship to complete a circumnavigation voyage.

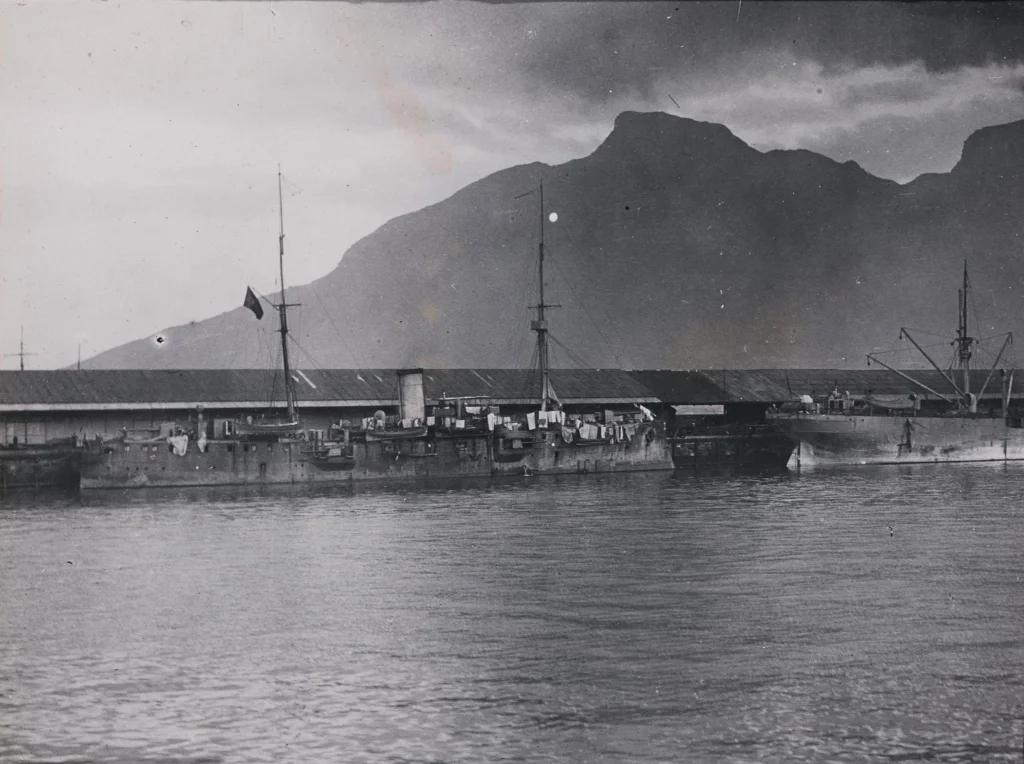
São Gabriel visiting Capetown on her circumnavigation voyage

While São Gabriel circumnavigated the world, her sister ship, São Rafael took an active part in fighting for the Republicans in the 5 October 1910 revolution by shelling the Terreiro do Paço and the Palácio das Necessidades. In 1911, while on patrol at the mouth of the Ave River she suffered ran aground, tearing out her bottom on the rocks. Only one casualty was sustained among the crew.

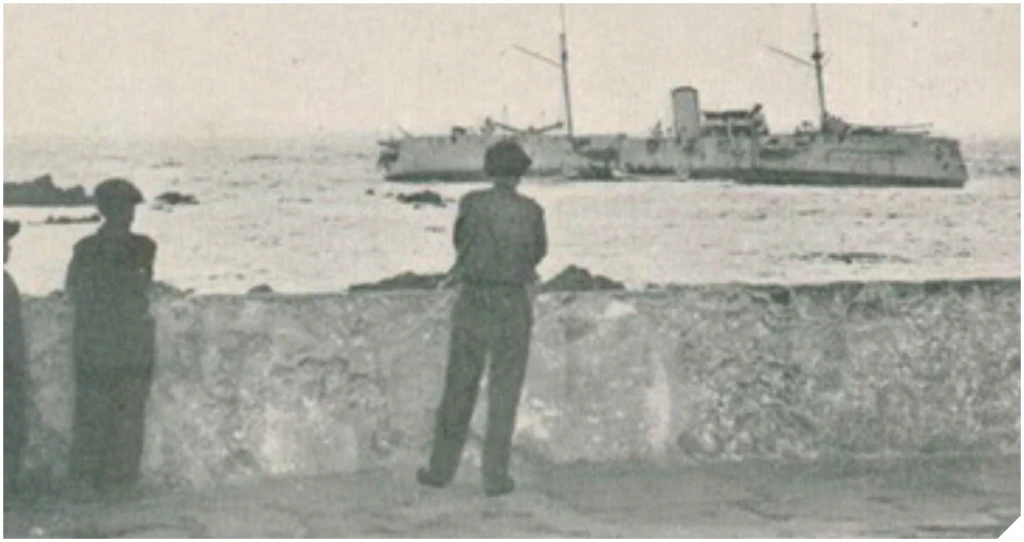
São Rafael wrecked offshore at the mouth of the Ave River

== Ships in class ==
Name	Shipyard	Launched	Commission	Fate
São Gabriel	Forges et Chantiers de la Méditerranée, Le Havre	7 May 1898	1898–1924	Sold for scrap, 1924
São Rafael	Forges et Chantiers de la Méditerranée, Le Havre	5 July 1898	1898–1911	Wrecked offshore, 1911
