= 1936 Portuguese naval revolt =

Mutiny in the Portuguese Navy

- Part of spillover of the Spanish Civil War
- Mutineers are arrested by government police forces.
Date	8 September 1936
Location	Lisbon, Portugal
Result	Government victory

Belligerents
(Portugal) Estado Novo	Organização Revolucionária da Armada (Portuguese Communist Party)

Commanders and leaders
(Portugal) António de Oliveira Salazar	Unknown

Strength
Shore defences 1 submarine	1 aviso 1 destroyer

Political support
National Union	Portuguese Communist Party

Casualties and losses
Unknown	Both ships beached 12 sailors killed 20 sailors wounded 238 sailors arrested

The 1936 naval revolt (Portuguese: Revolta dos Marinheiros de 1936, lit. '1936 Sailors' Revolt') or Tagus boats mutiny (Motim dos Barcos do Tejo) was a mutiny in Portugal that occurred on 8 September 1936 aboard the aviso Afonso de Albuquerque and destroyer Dão. It was organized by the Revolutionary Organization of the Fleet (Organização Revolucionária da Armada, ORA), a left-wing group with links to the Portuguese Communist Party.

The mutiny broke out on 8 September 1936 among communist sailors in the Portuguese Navy's two newest warships moored in the estuary of the Tagus River near Lisbon. Their aim was ostensibly to take part in the Spanish Civil War alongside the Republicans by sailing to a Republican-held port in the Mediterranean. However, the revolt failed and the convicted sailors were the first to be sent to the Tarrafal concentration camp established in the Cape Verde Islands to house political prisoners.

== Background ==
In February 1936, a coalition of leftist groups won the national election in Spain. Several Spanish conservatives sought refuge in Portugal, whose right-wing dictatorship, the Estado Novo, felt equally threatened by the change in government. Soon thereafter, a coup d'état led by generals Emilio Mola, José Sanjurjo and Francisco Franco, and supported by Spanish conservatives and fascists, initiated the Spanish Civil War. The Portuguese government offered support to Franco's forces in defiance of a non-intervention agreement they had been pressured to sign by their ally, the United Kingdom. The British government warned the Portuguese that they would not protect them from attacks by the Republican faction if Portugal continued to be involved in the war, making Portuguese Prime Minister António de Oliveira Salazar increasingly nervous about his position.

While the Portuguese government increased its support of Franco, the Portuguese Communist Party stepped up its activism in opposition to the Estado Novo. Through the Revolutionary Organization of the Fleet (Organização Revolucionária da Armada, ORA), which had grown in strength over the course of the early 1930s, the party plotted a mutiny of several Portuguese Navy ships with intention of allowing them to sail to Spain to assist the Spanish government in the war.

== Mutiny ==
The Portuguese fleet lay at anchor in the estuary of the Tagus River on 8 September 1936. The rebels planned to seize control of the ships present and the coastal forts. At 03:00 their ships were to begin their departure, following each other out at fifteen minute intervals. No word was received from the fort garrisons, so the rebels' plan would only work if they could embark before shore batteries came into action. However, a wireless operator tipped off the Portuguese Admiralty to the plan at around 01:00. A boat was immediately dispatched to survey the situation of the fleet.

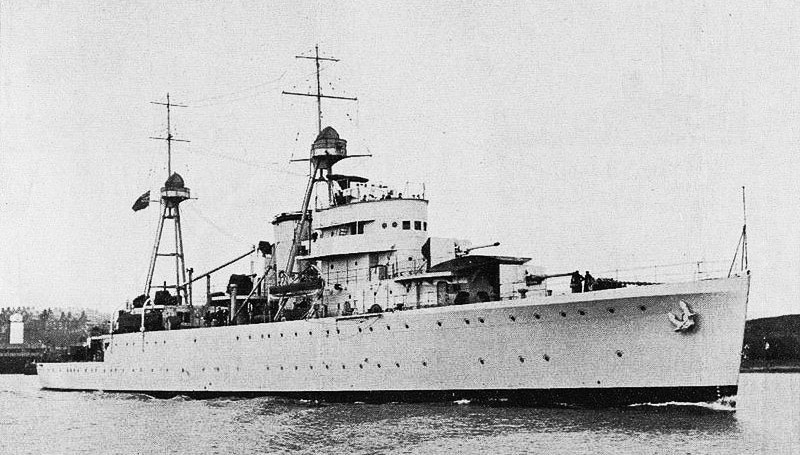
The aviso NRP Afonso de Albuquerque, pictured in 1935

Upon seeing the Admiralty launch, most of the Portuguese sailors realized their plot had been discovered and chose not to revolt. By then the crews of Afonso de Albuquerque and Dão, two of the navy's most modern ships, had already mutinied, forcing their officers below deck at gunpoint. The sailors on Afonso de Albuquerque attempted to lure the Admiralty officers aboard, but the launch fled and the crew opened fire with machine guns. It took almost an hour before the alarm was raised ashore. When the forts were finally alerted, they could not target the mutineers' ships due to a heavy mist. The rebels were hesitant to leave without further orders from their leaders, and did not attempt a breakout until daylight. The Portuguese naval minister ordered coastal artillery to fire on any vessel attempting to leave the harbour.

At 07:30 Afonso de Albuquerque and Dão raised steam and proceeded down the river at about 8 knots (15 km/h; 9.2 mph). By then the mist had cleared and the shore batteries opened fire. Afonso de Albuquerque responded but was soon struck. A loyal submarine — one of the three Delfim-class submarines in the harbor — opened fire on her with a machine gun. Afonso de Albuquerque's bridge was destroyed in the engagement and her engines were crippled. Dão, caught in the cross-fire between two forts, was also hit and both ships ran aground. The crews raised white flags to signal their surrender. Government forces boarded Afonso de Albuquerque and arrested its crew. In an attempt to conceal their actions, several sailors stripped off their uniforms and attempted to swim ashore. Loyal Portuguese troops raked them with machine gun fire. The rebels were rounded up near the Belém Tower and taken prisoner. The leader of the revolt, a sailor from Dão, committed suicide.

== Aftermath ==
The Portuguese Navy Ministry reported that twelve sailors were killed and twenty wounded. 238 were arrested and deported to the Tarrafal concentration camp on Santiago, Portuguese Cape Verde. (Note: According to journalist John Pilger, at least one of the sailors was deported to East Timor.) The Ministry dismissed both crews in their entirety, reinstating sailors only if they were able to prove they resisted the mutiny. An investigation was also opened into discipline aboard the aviso Bartolomeu Dias.

According to historian Glyn Stone, the revolt was "easily suppressed and remained an isolated incident" and did not pose a threat to Salazar. The German Ambassador to Portugal, Oswald von Hoyningen-Huene, reported that "it is even said that Salazar...provoked the dramatic development, or at the very least allowed matters to run their usual course." The government framed the mutiny as a communist plot to surrender the Portuguese ships to the Spanish Republican Navy. On 9 September, Salazar issued an official statement which depicted the Spanish Civil War as an international conflict and warned of the dangers of political contagion. He appealed for the creation of a new armed force to counter such a threat. The next day he introduced a law forcing all public servants to swear allegiance to the principles of his regime. On 30 September, an anti-communist paramilitary force, the Legião Portuguesa, was formed.

Communist activity in the Portuguese Armed Forces declined after the mutiny and remained minimal in the following years. Though it had dealt with the mutiny with force, the Portuguese government feared further revolts. Several days after the event the British press reported that several Portuguese Army units had rebelled, prompting the Portuguese embassy in London to issue a denial and declare the foreign press was depicting the Portuguese situation as chaotic to the Spanish government's benefit, and therefore the government was "obliged to intensify its offensive against communism". The mutiny ultimately strengthened Portuguese support for Franco's faction in the Spanish Civil War. In October the Portuguese government officially severed relations with the Spanish Republican government.

== See also ==
- Madeira uprising (1931)
