= NRP Bartolomeu Dias (1934) =

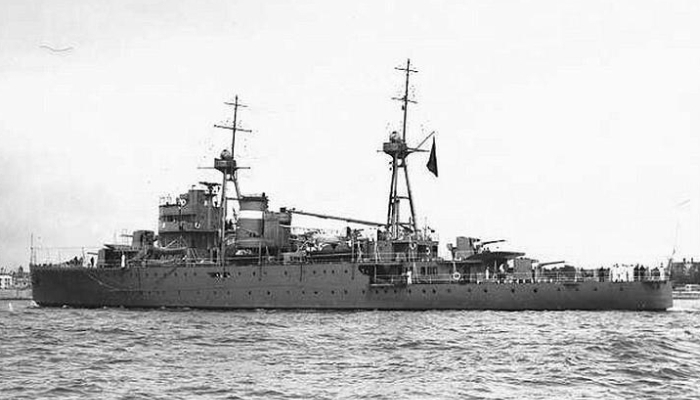

History

Portugal
- Name: NRP Bartolomeu Dias
- Namesake: Bartolomeu Dias
- Builder: Hawthorn-Leslie
- Launched: 10 October 1934
- Fate: Hulked in 1965

General characteristics
- Class & type: Afonso de Albuquerque-class sloop
- Displacement: 1,811 tons standard, 2,100 tons normal load, 2,435 tons full load
- Length: 99.6 m (326 ft 9 in)
- Beam: 13.49 m (44 ft 3 in)
- Draught: 3.81 m (12 ft 6 in)
- Propulsion: 2 Parsons geared turbines; 4 Yarrow boilers, 8,000 shp (6,000 kW); Oil fuel: 600 tons
- Speed: 21 knots (39 km/h; 24 mph)
- Range: 8,000 nmi (15,000 km; 9,200 mi) at 10 knots (19 km/h; 12 mph)
- Complement: 191
- Armament: 4 × 120 mm guns, 2 × 76 mm guns, 4 × 40 mm anti-aircraft guns, 2 × throwers for depth charges, Fitted to carry 40 naval mines
- Aircraft carried: 1 (design, not carried in service)

NRP Bartolomeu Dias was a sloop of the Portuguese Navy. The ship was the second of the Afonso de Albuquerque class, which also included the lead ship of the class, NRP Afonso de Albuquerque. These ships were classified, by the Portuguese Navy, as avisos coloniais de 1ª classe (colonial aviso 1st class) and were designed for colonial service in the Overseas territories of Portugal.

Following the failed 1936 Naval Revolt, an investigation was opened into discipline aboard the ship.
