= NRP João de Lisboa =

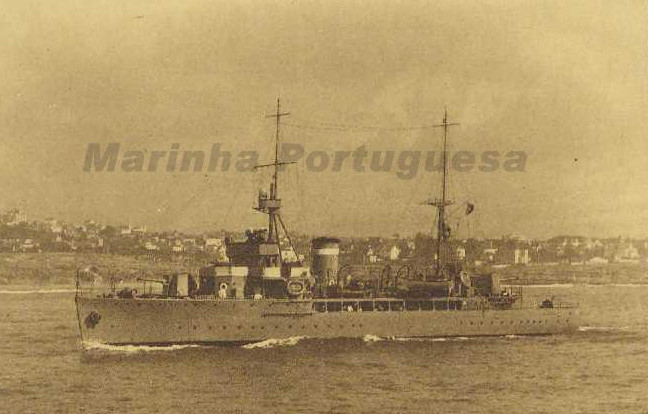

History

Portugal
- Name: NRP João de Lisboa
- Builder: Arsenal da Marinha - Lisboa
- Launched: 21 May 1936
- Fate: 1961 converted to hydrographic vessel

General characteristics
- Class & type: Pedro Nunes class
- Displacement: 1,017 tons standard, 1,217 tons full load
- Length: 70.5 m (231 ft)
- Beam: 10.0 m (32.8 ft)
- Draught: 3.1 m (10 ft)
- Propulsion: 2 MAN Diesels; 2,400 hp
- Speed: 16 knots (30 km/h)
- Complement: 140
- Armament: 2 × 120 mm guns, 4 × 40 mm guns, 2 × throwers for depth charges

NRP João de Lisboa was a 2nd class sloop (or aviso) of the Portuguese Navy. She was designed to operate in the Overseas territories of Portugal.

Its name was given in honor of the Portuguese explorer and cartographer João de Lisboa. It became a research vessel from 1961 until 1966.
