= Atlantic, Gulf and Pacific Steamship Corporation =

Defunct American shipping company

- Industry: Freight transport
- Founded: 1920
- Founders: W. Bernard Duke, Currall A. Askew, William B. W. Mann
- Defunct: 1922
- Fate: Bankruptcy
- Headquarters: Baltimore, Maryland

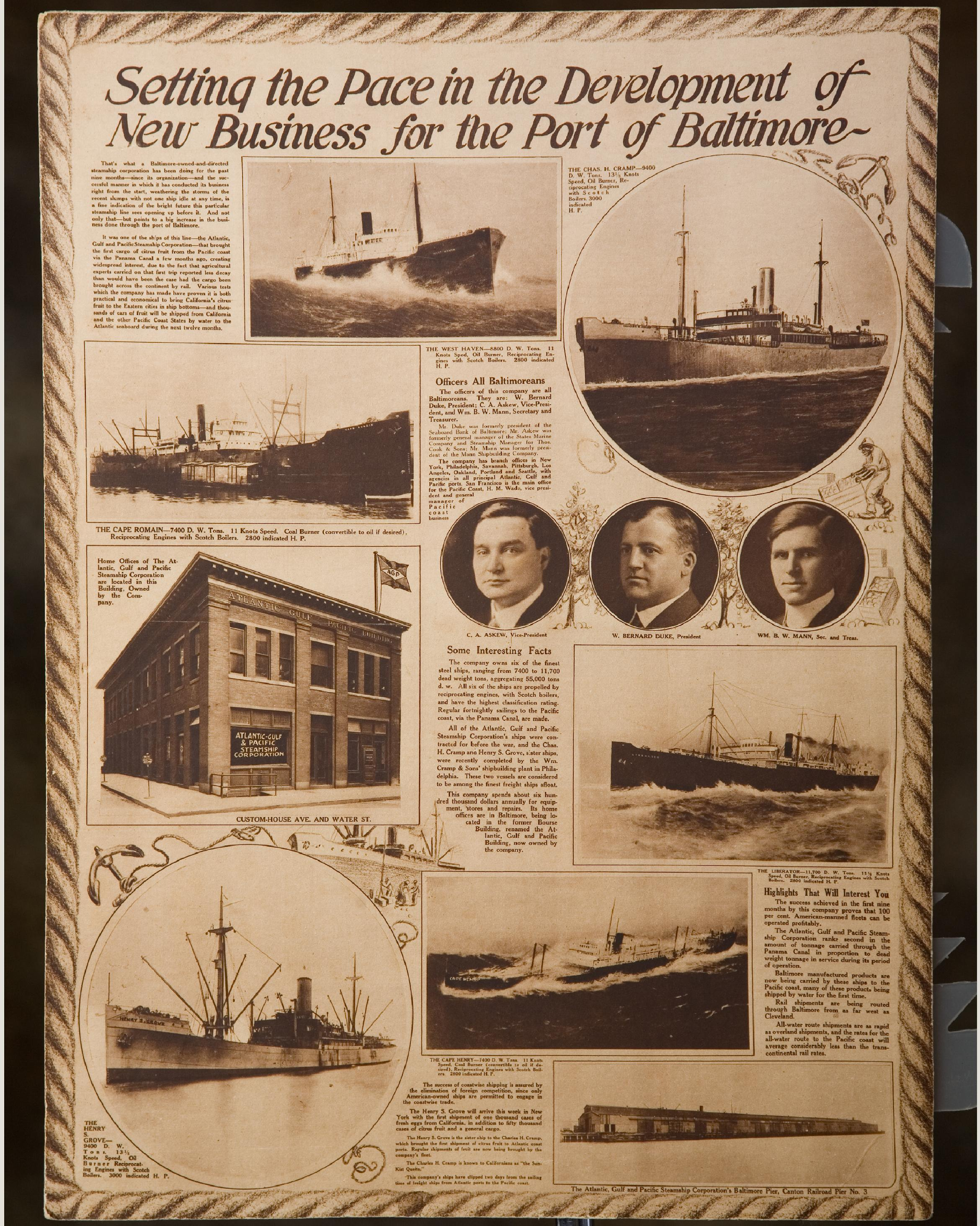
APG Publicity Flyer

Financial Plan 1920

The Atlantic, Gulf and Pacific Steamship Corporation of Baltimore, Maryland, was incorporated in May 1920. Its primary mission was to transport goods and produce across the Atlantic, across the Pacific and coast to coast via the Panama Canal. It was started by Baltimore natives W. Bernard Duke, President, Currall A. Askew, Vice President, and William B. W. Mann, Secretary and Treasurer. Duke had been President of the Seaboard Bank of Baltimore; Askew was previously General Manager of States Marine Company and Steamship Manager for Thomas Cook and Sons; Mann was formerly of Mann Shipbuilding Company.

Approximately $2 Million in capital was raised to begin the venture. With that amount six ships were purchased from the United States Shipping Board. The ships included the Charles H. Cramp, the Liberator, the H. S. Grove, the Cape Romain, the Cape Henry and the West Haven. They ranged in size from 7,400 dead weight tons to 11,700 and totaled 55,000 tons.

In 1921, they became the first company to transport citrus fruit between coasts via ship and the Panama Canal. The ship Charles H. Cramp brought that first shipment of fruit. The advantage touted by the shipping company was lower cost for the transport versus rail as well as less spoilage. To celebrate this milestone a luncheon was held at the Reunart Hotel in Baltimore February 5, 1921, with O. E. Goodman of the California Fruit Growers Exchange (which in 1952 became Sunkist, Inc.) and S. W. Collins of the U. S. Department of Agriculture attending as guests of honor. Collins had arranged the test shipment and made the voyage. Baltimore's Mayor William Frederick Broening also attended.

The Atlantic, Gulf & Pacific Steamship Corporation was bankrupted in August 1922 after little more than two years in operation, due to a rate war between seven different companies for the intercoastal trade. Atlantic, Gulf & Pacific was the first of the seven companies to go broke. At the time of the company's bankruptcy, it had paid only $195,000 of the $9,000,000 owed to the United States Shipping Board for the purchase of its six ships.

The company's President Bernard Duke claimed unfair treatment by the US Shipping Board in regard to the seizing of its ships and forced bankruptcy. His opinion was published in the December 1922 issue of the Nautical Gazette.

== See also ==
- USS West Haven (ID-2159)

== Bibliography ==
- Baltimore Sun, Sunday, February 6, 1921, p. 21.
- Baltimore Sun, Tuesday, August 15, 1922, p. 22.
