= Luís Magalhães Correia =

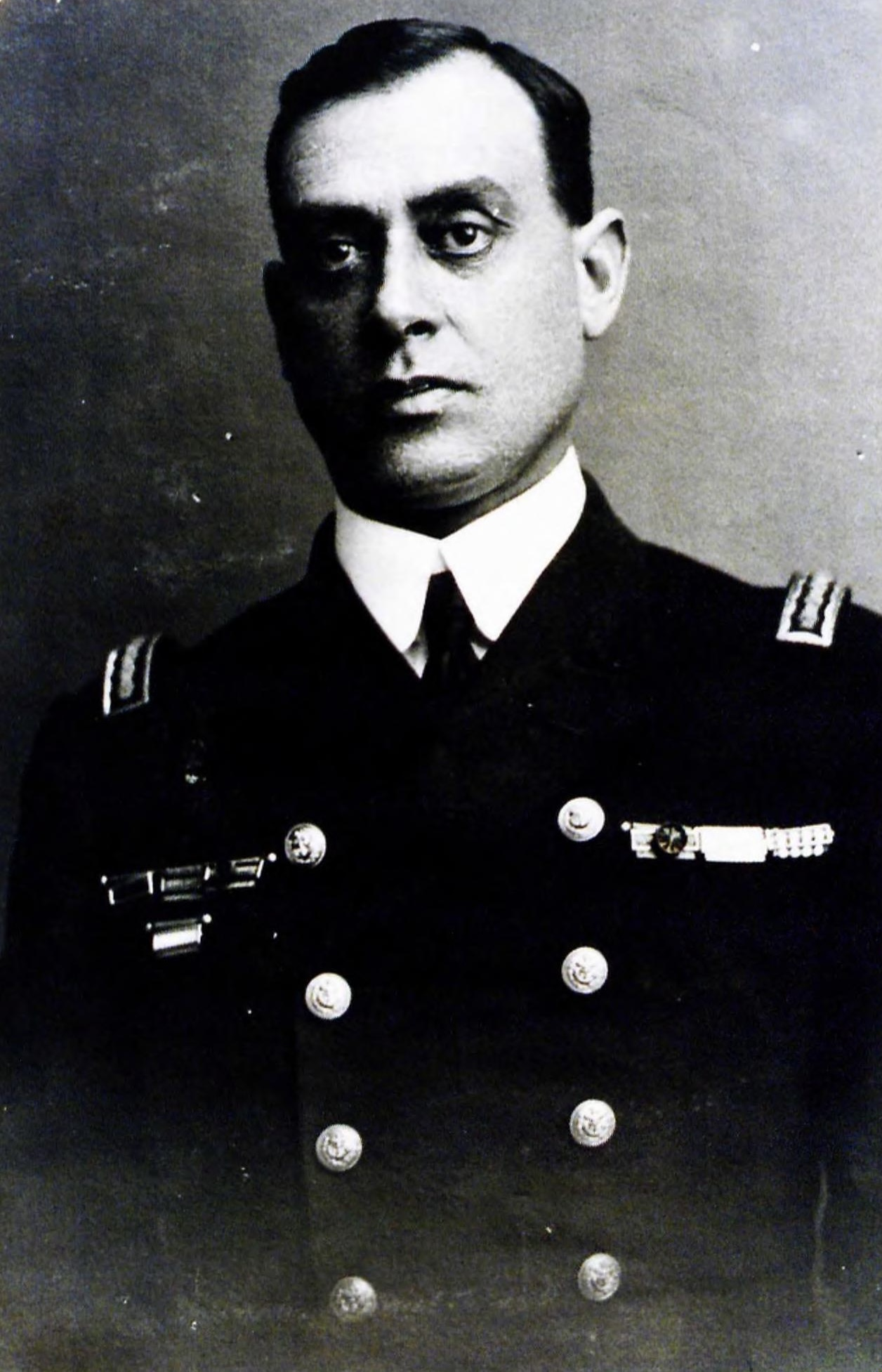
Luís Magalhães Correia

Luís António de Magalhães Correia or Luís António de Magalhães Corrêa (30 June 1873 - 29 September 1960) was a Portuguese naval officer, becoming a vice-admiral in 1937. He is also notable as a government minister and colonial administrator. From 1928 to 1930 he was Navy Minister and governor of Macau and from 1945 to 1948 administrator of the Tangier International Zone. He also served as interim Foreign Minister.

== Life ==
He was born in Lisbon, volunteering for the Portuguese Army aged just 14 and later attending the Royal Military College. He transferred to the navy, attending the Naval School and passing out top of his class. At the end of his naval training, on 19 May 1891, aged 18, he was promoted from cadet to guarda-marinha, starting his naval career on the frigate Dom Fernando II e Glória before transferring to the gunboat Diu, then commanded by captain lieutenant Manuel de Azevedo Gomes and attached to Portugal's naval forces in the Far East. In 1893, he was still aboard the Diu but now at the rank of second lieutenant when unrest broke out in Portuguese Timor. Then stationed in Macau, the ship was sent to Timor at full-speed, where it joined the bombardment of Maubara on 21 June that year. For his conduct on that posting he was granted the Order of the Tower and Sword on 3 November 1893.

Appointed port captain for Mozambique, in 1897 he was promoted to first lieutenant and given command of the Gaza Squadron of Portugal's Indian Ocean Naval Division. During that period he was also appointed governor of the District of Manica and Sofala in Mozambique. Whilst in the Indian Ocean also served aboard the gunboat Faro, the launches Capelo and Serpa Pinto, the transport ship India and the ironclad Vasco da Gama. On his return to Lisbon, he was made an adjutant to the Naval Ministry on 1 July 1907. He then became a torpedo instructor and in 1910 was sent to Livorno in north-east Italy to join the sea trials of the Portuguese submarine Espadarte.

He was then sent back to Macau to command the gunboat Pátria both there and in Portuguese India and Timor and whilst on that station he was also Macau's port captain and chief of naval staff. He was also appointed Governor of Macau in 1922 by president António Maria da Silva and served in that post until the following year. That period was particularly difficult for the Portuguese imperial government there due to strong Bolshevik influence felt in southern China, which led to some armed attacks. He was promoted to frigate-captain in 1923 and put in command of the torpedo boats Mineiro and Fulminante, the destroyers Tejo and Tâmega and the cruiser Vasco da Gama. In 1926 he was appointed the far eastern colonies' representative on the Conselho do Comércio Exterior de Portugal, exercising the roles of Director of Naval Stores and Naval Chief of Staff.

Backing the 28 May 1926 coup d'état, he was persuaded to join the cabinet on 8 July 1929 as Naval Minister, holding that post until 21 January 1930. During his term of office he received the Almirante Schultz on 6 October and accompanied the Portuguese president general Óscar Carmona on his official visit to Spain on 17 October - for the second event he also became Foreign Minister for ten days after the death of the role's last holder Jaime da Fonseca Monteiro. His role as Naval Minister was renewed when Domingos Oliveira replaced Artur Ivens Ferraz as head of the cabinet, holding it until 5 July 1932 and also replacing Fernando Branco as interim foreign minister. Even under Ferraz he had begun to planning a restructuring and re-equipping of the Portuguese Navy, which became known as the Portuguese Naval Programme and was put into effect from 1931 onwards. It was the nation's biggest and best-planned naval rearmament of the 20th century and left a decisive mark on the fleet until around 1975. In 1930 he was promoted to rear-admiral.

== Honours ==
- Order of the Tower and Sword, Knight (Cavaleiro)
- Ordem Militar de Cristo, Grand Cross (Grã-Cruz)
- Ordem Militar de Avis, Grand Cross (Grã-Cruz)
- Order of the Colonial Empire, Grand Officer (Grande-Oficial)
