= Delfim-class submarine =

Portuguese Navy submarines

- Golfinho

Class overview
- Name: Delfim-class submarine
- Builders: Vickers-Armstrongs, Barrow-in-Furness, England
- Operators: Portuguese Navy
- Preceded by: Foca class
- Succeeded by: S class
- Built: 1933–1935
- In commission: 1934-1950
- Completed: 3
- Retired: 3

General characteristics
- Type: Submarine
- Displacement: 800 long tons (813 t) (surfaced); 1,092 long tons (1,110 t) (submerged)
- Length: 69.23 m (227 ft 2 in)
- Beam: 6.50 m (21 ft 4 in)
- Draught: 3.86 m (12 ft 8 in)
- Propulsion: 2 × Vickers diesel engines, 2,300 bhp (1,715 kW); 2 × electric motors, 1,000 shp (746 kW); 2 x shafts
- Speed: 16.5 knots (30.6 km/h; 19.0 mph) (surfaced); 9.25 knots (17.13 km/h; 10.64 mph) (submerged)
- Range: 5,000 nmi (9,300 km; 5,800 mi) at 10 knots (19 km/h; 12 mph) (surfaced); 2,000 nmi (3,700 km; 2,300 mi) at 16.5 knots (30.6 km/h; 19.0 mph) (surfaced); 110 nmi (200 km; 130 mi) at 4 knots (7.4 km/h; 4.6 mph) (submerged); 8 nmi (15 km; 9.2 mi) at 9.25 knots (17.13 km/h; 10.64 mph) (submerged)
- Complement: 36
- Armament: 2 × 533 mm (21 in) torpedo tubes (4 bow, 2 stern); 12 x torpedoes; 1 × 4 in (102 mm) deck gun; 2 x machine guns
- Notes: SOURCE:

The Delfim-class submarines were a class of three submarines built in the United Kingdom for Portugal in the 1930s. They served in the Portuguese Navy between 1934 and 1950.

== Design ==
Delfim is launched at Barrow-in-Furness, England, on 1 May 1934.

By the late 1920s, the Portuguese Navy had decommissioned its first submarine, Espadarte, and its remaining submarine force — which consisted of the three aging vessels of the Foca class — was in such poor material condition that its submarines no longer could operate except in protected coastal waters under controlled conditions. To address the obsolescence and decreasing operability of its submarine force and replace the Foca-class submarines, the 1930 naval program designed by Minister of the Navy Contra-almirante (Counter Admiral) Luís Magalhães Correia included three new submarines of the Delfim class.

Vickers-Armstrongs designed the Delfim class as medium-sized patrol submarines. They were somewhat smaller than British submarines of the era but similar to them in appearance, except that the deck gun was housed in a fully enclosed gunhouse. The Delfim-class submarines were 69.23 metres (227 ft 2 in) long and had a beam of 6.50 metres (21 ft 4 in) and a draft of 3.86 metres (12 ft 8 in). They displaced 800 long tons (813 t) on the surface and 1,092 long tons (1,110 t) submerged.

Two Vickers diesel engines producing a combined 2,300 bhp (1,715 kW) drove two screws and gave the Delfim-class submarines a top speed on the surface of 16.5 knots (30.6 km/h; 19.0 mph). Their two electric motors produced a combined 1,000 shp (746 kW) and gave them a maximum submerged speed of 9.25 knots (17.13 km/h; 10.64 mph). On the surface, they had a range of 2,000 nmi (2,300 mi; 3,700 km) at full speed and 5,000 nmi (5,800 mi; 9,300 km) at 10 knots (18.5 km/h; 11.5 mph). Submerged, their range was 8 nmi (9.2 mi; 15 km) at full speed and 110 nmi (127 mi; 204 km) at 4 knots (7.4 km/h; 4.6 mph).

Each Delfim-class submarine had six 533 mm (21-inch) torpedo tubes, four in the bow and two in the stern. They carried 12 torpedoes, giving them one reload for each tube. Each submarine also had a 4-inch (102-mm) deck gun and two machine guns. The Delfim-class submarines had a crew of 36.

== Construction ==
The Vickers-Armstrongs shipyard at Barrow-in-Furness, England, built the submarines. It laid down all three of them in March 1933 and delivered them to the Portuguese Navy between December 1934 and March 1935.

== Delfim-class submarines ==
The Delfim-class submarines served in the Portuguese Navy from the mid-1930s until 1950, forming the 2nd Submarine Squadron. Although this included the World War II period (1939–1945), Portugal remained neutral during the war, limiting the submarines to patrol and training duties along the Portuguese coast during the conflict. They thus had fairly uneventful careers.

Ship name	Builder	Laid down	Launched	Commissioned	Decommissioned	Fate
Delfim	Vickers-Armstrongs, Barrow-in-Furness, England	9 March 1933	1 May 1934	16 December 1934	14 November 1950	Stricken 29 May 1953; scrapped
Espadarte	Vickers-Armstrongs, Barrow-in-Furness, England	9 March 1933	30 May 1934	24 January 1935	14 November 1950	Stricken 30 November 1954; scrapped
Golfinho	Vickers-Armstrongs, Barrow-in-Furness, England	9 March 1933	30 May 1934	14 March 1935	14 November 1950	Stricken 1952; scrapped
