= NRP Espadarte (1912) =

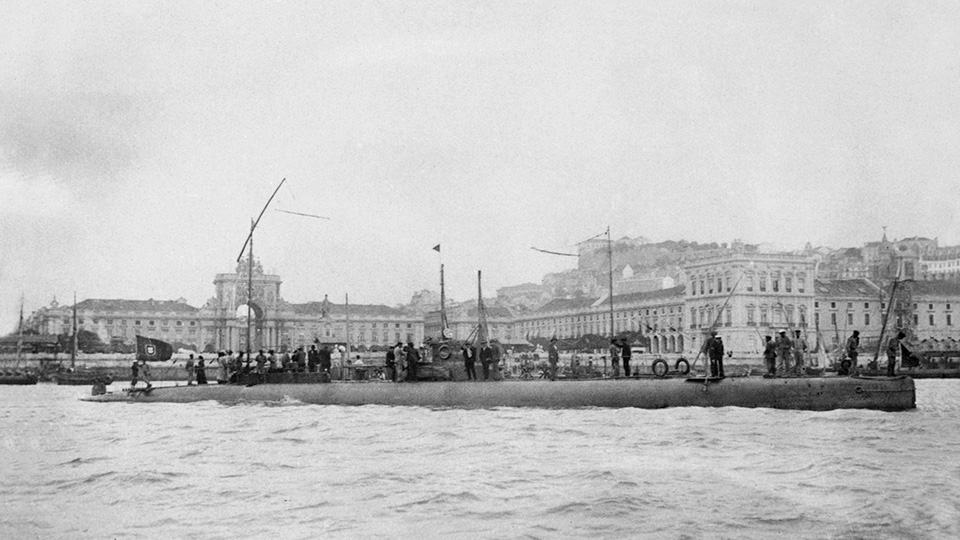
- NRP Espadarte in Lisbon

History

Portugal
- Name: NRP Espadarte
- Namesake: Swordfish
- Builder: La Spezia Naval Base, Italy
- Laid down: 1910
- Launched: 5 October 1912
- Commissioned: 1913
- Fate: Discarded in 1931

General characteristics
- Type: Submarine
- Displacement: 245 long tons (249 t) standard; 300 long tons (300 t) submerged
- Length: 148 ft 0 in (45.1 m)
- Beam: 13 ft 9 in (4.2 m)
- Draught: 10 ft 0 in (3.0 m) max
- Propulsion: 2 shafts; 2 Fiat-Diesel 6-cylinder motors 550 bhp (410 kW); 2 electric motors 300 shp (220 kW)
- Speed: 13.8 knots (25.6 km/h; 15.9 mph) (Surfaced); 8 knots (15 km/h; 9.2 mph) (Submerged)
- Range: 1,500 nautical miles at 8.5 knots (2,800 km at 15.7 km/h)
- Complement: 21
- Armament: 2 × 457 mm (18 in) bow torpedo tubes; 4 torpedoes

NRP Espadarte was the first modern submarine of the Portuguese Navy. Preceded by Plongeur which was discarded in 1910, Espadarte was constructed at La Spezia Naval Base, Italy beginning in 1910 and was launched in 1912. The submarine was the basis for the establishment of the 1st Submarine Squadron of the Portuguese Navy. Espadarte was discarded in 1931.

== Design and description ==
Espadarte was 148 feet 0 inches (45.1 m) long with a beam of 13 feet 9 inches (4.2 m) and a mean draught of 9 feet 8 inches (2.9 m) and a maximum of draught of 10 feet 0 inches (3.0 m). The boat had a standard displacement of 245 long tons (249 t) and 300 long tons (300 t) submerged. The submarine was powered by two Fiat-Diesel 6-cylinder motors driving two shafts, rated at 550 brake horsepower (410 kW) for travel on the surface and two electric motors rated at 300 shaft horsepower (220 kW) when submerged. The submarine had a maximum speed of 13.8 knots (25.6 km/h; 15.9 mph) and a maximum range of 1,500 nautical miles at 8.5 knots (2,800 km at 15.7 km/h).

The submarine was armed with two torpedo tubes located in the bow for 457 mm (18 in) torpedoes. Four torpedoes were carried. Espadarte had a ship's company of 21 officers and ratings.

== Construction and career ==
The submarine was built at La Spezia Naval Base, Italy from 1910 to 1913. Espadarte was launched on 5 October 1912 and commissioned during the reign of Manuel II. The submersible first entered Lisbon on 5 August 1913. NRP Espadarte became part of the Portuguese Navy's 1st Submarine Squadron, which was established after the arrival in Portugal of the three Foca-class submarines in 1918. The squadron's four submarines — Espadarte, Foca, Golfinho, and Hidra — served during the remainder of World War I. Espadarte was discarded in 1931.
