= NRP Afonso de Albuquerque (1934) =

Warship of the Portuguese Navy

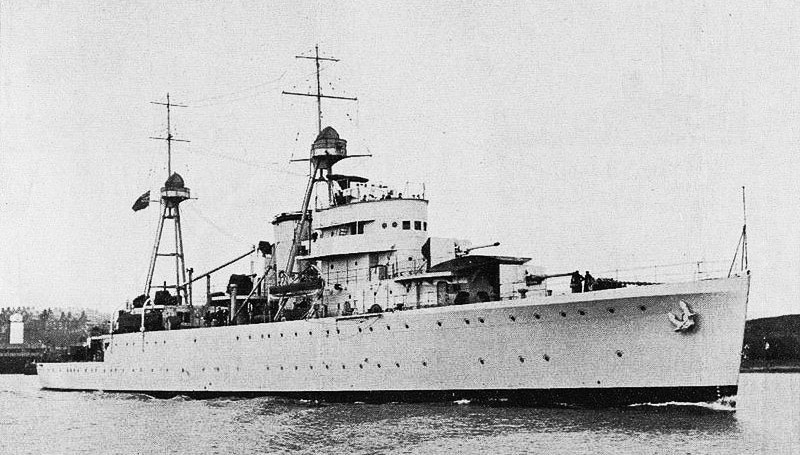
- Afonso de Albuquerque in 1935

History

Portugal
- Name: Afonso de Albuquerque
- Namesake: Afonso de Albuquerque
- Builder: Hawthorn Leslie
- Launched: 1934
- Commissioned: 28 May 1934
- Fate: Destroyed in combat in 1961

General characteristics
- Class & type: Afonso de Albuquerque class
- Displacement: 1,811 tons standard, 2,100 tons normal load, 2,435 tons full load
- Length: 100 m (328 ft 1 in)
- Beam: 13.49 m (44 ft 3 in)
- Draught: 3.81 m (12 ft 6 in)
- Propulsion: 2 Parsons geared turbines; 4 Yarrow boilers, 8,000 shp (6,000 kW); Oil fuel: 600 tons
- Speed: 21 knots (39 km/h)
- Range: 8,000 mi (13,000 km) at 10 knots (19 km/h)
- Complement: 191
- Armament: 4 × 120 mm guns, 2 × 76 mm guns, 4 × 40 mm anti-aircraft guns, 2 × throwers for depth charges, Fitted to carry 40 mines
- Aircraft carried: 1

NRP Afonso de Albuquerque was a warship of the Portuguese Navy, named after the 16th-century general and viceroy of Portuguese India Afonso de Albuquerque. She was destroyed on 18 December 1961, defending Goa against the invading Indian Armed Forces Annexation of Goa.

The ship was the first of the Afonso de Albuquerque class, which also included NRP Bartolomeu Dias. These ships were classified, by the Portuguese Navy, as avisos coloniais de 1ª classe (1st class colonial aviso or sloop) and were designed to maintain a Portuguese naval presence in the Overseas territories of Portugal. They had limited capacity to fight other surface vessels, as they were intended, mainly, to support amphibious operations and troops on land.

After the Second World War, the Afonso de Albuquerque-class ships were reclassified as frigates. In her career Afonso de Albuquerque served mainly in the Indian and the Pacific Oceans, protecting the Portuguese territories of Mozambique, India, Macau and Timor.

== History ==
=== 1936 mutiny ===
On 8 September 1936 the crews of Afonso de Albuquerque and the destroyer Dão mutinied while anchored in Lisbon harbour. Opposed to the Salazar dictatorship's support of the Nationalists rebels against the pro-government Republicans in the Spanish Civil War, the sailors confined their officers and declared their solidarity with the Spanish Republic. As the ships were leaving the Tejo estuary they were fired upon by the batteries from the forts and both Afonso de Albuquerque and Dão received hits and were grounded. Some of the sailors were killed while trying to flee, but most of them were arrested and sent to the penal colony of Tarrafal in Portuguese Cape Verde. After the mutiny was put down the government claimed that the sailors had prepared to sail to Spain to assist the Spanish Republic.

=== RMS Nova Scotia ===
On 28 November 1942, Afonso de Albuquerque was in Lourenço Marques (Maputo) when the German submarine U-177 torpedoed and sank the British troop ship Nova Scotia off the coast of Natal Province, South Africa. Nova Scotia had 1,052 people aboard, most of them Italian prisoners of war or civilian internees, but in accordance with the Laconia Order that Admiral Karl Dönitz, Befehlshaber der U-Boote (BdU) had issued two months previously, U-177 left the scene without rescuing survivors. Dönitz requested help from the Portuguese authorities, who sent Afonso de Albuquerque to the scene. The ship reached the position the next day, by which time survivors who were in the water had either drowned or been eaten by sharks.

Five survivors fired a distress flare and were rescued by the ship. The next day Afonso de Albuquerque found herself surrounded by hundreds of floating corpses. The crew rescued 130 Italian internees, 42 guards, 17 crew members, three military and naval personnel, one DEMS gunner and one passenger. 858 people were lost: 650 Italian internees, 96 crew members, 88 South African guards, 10 DEMS gunners, eight military and naval personnel, five passengers, and Nova Scotia's master.

=== Timor ===
In December 1941 Australian and Dutch forces occupied Portuguese Timor to 'defend the territory against possible Japanese invasion'. In February 1942, in response to the Australian and Dutch occupation, Japanese forces invaded Timor and occupied Timor until the end of the Second World War, at the end of which Portugal sent a naval and military expedition to re-occupy and reconstruct East Timor. Afonso de Albuquerque escorted the 7,884 GRT troopship Angola, which carried the first Portuguese troops of the expedition, reaching Timor on 29 September 1945.

=== Goa ===
Late in 1961, unable to convince Portugal to relinquish its integrated territories in the Indian subcontinent, India launched Operation Vijay to seize Goa and Daman and Diu by force. Afonso de Albuquerque was based in Goa as the leading naval unit of the Portuguese India Naval Command, with Captain Cunha Aragão as her commander. Early on the morning of 18 December 1961 Afonso de Albuquerque received information that the Indian Armed Forces had launched Operation Vijay. Her crew went to battle stations. As the land communication infrastructure was bombed and destroyed by the Indian Air Force, Afonso de Albuquerque received the responsibility to maintain radio communications between Goa and Lisbon. At 09:00, Afonso de Albuquerque sighted three Indian Navy ships, led by the Leopard-class frigate INS Betwa, just outside the Mormugao port. The two frigates and a minesweeper were an advance group of a flotilla which included the light aircraft carrier INS Vikrant and about ten light cruisers, destroyers, frigates and minesweepers.

At 12:00, as the Portuguese commanders refused to surrender, INS Betwa and her sister ship INS Beas forced the entrance into the port and opened fire on Afonso de Albuquerque, which moved towards the enemy ships and returned fire. At the same time, the final radio message was sent to Lisbon,

"We are being attacked. We are responding."

Afonso de Albuquerque was hit by Indian fire. At 12:20, when she tried to manoeuvre to a position in which she could use all her guns, her command bridge was hit, killing her radio officer and seriously wounding Captain Aragão. Aragão ordered First Officer Sarmento Gouveia, to assume command with instructions not to surrender. Under heavy fire, some of the crew evacuated the wounded commander to shore and transferred him by car to medical facilities at Panjim. At 12:35, under massive fire and with her boilers and engines already destroyed, the frigate's crew ran her aground onto the beach to serve as a shore battery. The crew continued to resist and fight until about the 14:10. The crew was captured by Indian forces on the next day at 20:30. It is estimated that during her last combat Afonso de Albuquerque fired almost 400 shells. On the Indian Union side, two frigates were hit, killing five sailors and injuring thirteen but the advantage of the Indian Navy was significant, as their ships were more modern. Afonso de Albuquerque lay grounded at the beach near Dona Paula until 1962 when she was refloated and towed to Bombay. Parts of the ship are on display at a museum in Mumbai. The remainder was sold as scrap.

== Bibliography ==
- Sturton, Ian (2005). "Question 6/94: Loss of Portuguese Sloop". Warship International. XLII (1): 26–27. ISSN 0043-0374.
