= Navy Ministry (Portugal) =

- Ministério da Marinha

Agency overview
- Formed: 1736
- Preceding agency: Ministry of National Defense
- Dissolved: 1974
- Jurisdiction: Government of Portugal
- Headquarters: Lisbon
- Child agency: Portuguese Navy

The Navy Ministry (Ministério da Marinha) was the government department responsible for both the Portuguese Navy and all civilian maritime matters. Until 1911, it also was responsible for the management of the Portuguese overseas territories.

The ministry was created in 1736, as the Secretariat of State of the Navy and of the Overseas Affairs (Secretaria de Estado dos Negócios da Marinha e do Ultramar). In the second half of the 19th century, it became mainly referred to as the Ministry of Navy and of the Overseas. In 1911, it became simply the Navy Ministry, as the Overseas affairs came under a separate Government department.

Its extinction began in 1974, following the Carnation Revolution, but it was only abolished in 1982 when it was integrated into the Ministry of National Defence (Ministério da Defesa Nacional). Part of the non-military roles of the former Navy Ministry (like fisheries and merchant marine affairs) were assigned to other ministries, mainly the Ministry of Agriculture, Forestry and Rural Development.

== See also ==
- List of Navy Ministers of Portugal
