= NRP Dão =

Douro-class destroyer of the Portuguese Navy, in service from 1935 to 1960

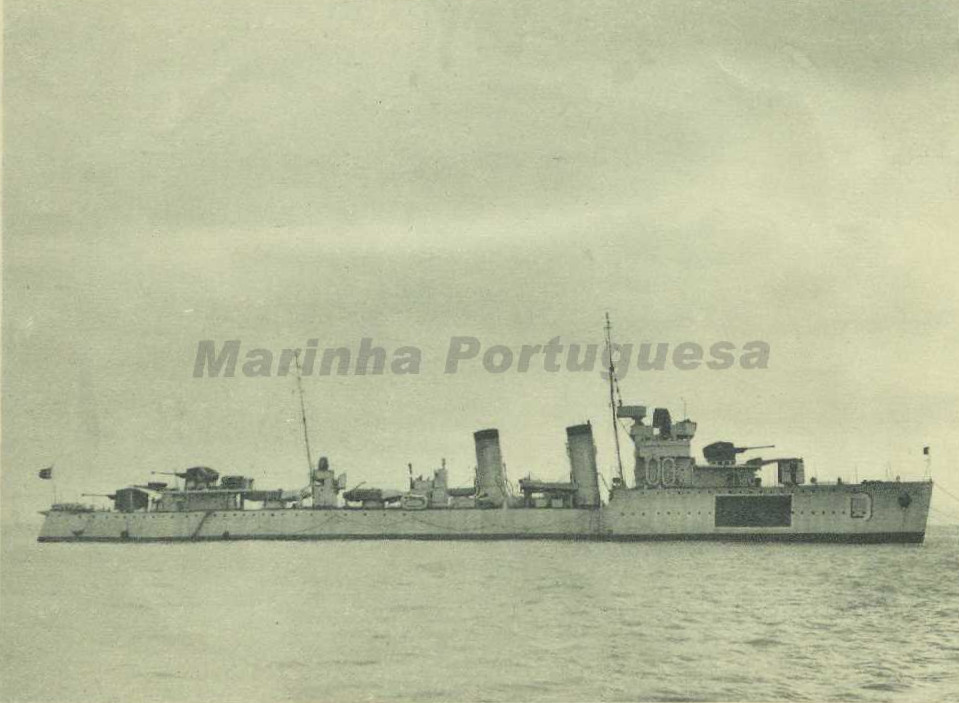
- Dão

History

Portugal
- Name: NRP Dão
- Namesake: Dão River
- Builder: Lisbon Dockyard
- Launched: 30 July 1934
- Commissioned: 5 January 1935
- Fate: Stricken 29 November 1960

General characteristics (as built)
- Type: Douro-class destroyer
- Displacement: 1,219 long tons (1,239 t) (standard); 1,563 long tons (1,588 t) (full load)
- Length: 323 ft (98.5 m)
- Beam: 31 ft (9.4 m)
- Draught: 11 ft (3.4 m)
- Installed power: 3 × Yarrow boilers; 33,000 shp (25,000 kW)
- Propulsion: 2 shafts; 2 × geared steam turbines
- Speed: 36 knots (67 km/h; 41 mph)
- Range: 5,400 nmi (10,000 km; 6,200 mi) at 15 knots (28 km/h; 17 mph)
- Complement: 147
- Armament: 4 × single 4.7 in (120 mm) guns; 3 × single 2 pdr (40 mm (1.6 in)) AA guns; 2 × quadruple 21 in (533 mm) torpedo tubes; 2 × depth charge throwers; 12 depth charges; 20 × mines

NRP Dão was one of five Douro-class destroyer built for the Portuguese Navy during the 1930s. She remained in service until 1960, being refitted and re-armed several times and taking part in a coup attempt in 1936.

== Construction and design ==
The British shipbuilder Yarrows's design was based on Ambuscade, a prototype destroyer built for the Royal Navy in 1926. On 18 January 1933, a fifth destroyer of the class was ordered from the Lisbon Shipyard, with machinery to be built by Yarrow. Portuguese Dictator António de Oliveira Salazar gave a speech to commemorate the beginning of construction, thanking the navy minister for "choosing to name this unit of our fleet after the river that crosses my town." Dão was launched on 30 July 1934 and commissioned on 5 January 1935.

The Douro-class ships were 323 feet (98.45 m) long overall, with a beam of 31 feet (9.45 m) and a draught of 11 feet (3.35 m). They displaced 1,219 long tons (1,239 t) at standard load and 1,563 long tons (1,588 t) at full load.

The Douros were powered by two Parsons-Curtis geared steam turbines, each driving one propeller shaft using steam provided by three Yarrow boilers. The turbines, rated at 33,000 shaft horsepower (25,000 kW), were intended to give a maximum speed of 36 knots (67 km/h; 41 mph). The destroyers carried enough fuel oil to give them a range of 5,400 nautical miles (10,000 km; 6,200 mi) at 15 knots (28 km/h; 17 mph).

Armament was similar to contemporary Royal Navy destroyers, with a gun armament of four 4.7 in (120 mm) Vickers-Armstrongs Mk G guns, and three 2-pounder (40 mm (1.6 in)) Mk VIII anti-aircraft guns. Two quadruple banks of 21-inch (533 mm) torpedo tubes were carried, while two depth charge throwers and 12 depth charges constituted the ships' anti-submarine armament. Up to 20 mines could be carried. The ships complement was 147 officers and men.

== History ==
=== 1936 mutiny ===
On 9 September 1936 the crews of the aviso Afonso de Albuquerque and the Dão mutinied while anchored in Lisbon harbour. Opposed to the Salazar dictatorship's support of the Nationalists rebels against the pro-government Republicans in the Spanish Civil War, the sailors confined their officers and declared their solidarity with the Spanish Republic. As the ships were leaving the Tejo estuary they were fired upon by the batteries from the forts and both Afonso de Albuquerque and Dão received direct hits and were grounded. Some of the sailors were killed while trying to flee, but most of the sailors were arrested and sent to the penal colony of Tarrafal in Portuguese Cape Verde. After the mutiny was put down the government claimed that the sailors had prepared to sail to Spain in order to assist the Spanish Republic.
