= List of decommissioned ships of the Colombian Navy =

Colombian Navy Armada de la República de Colombia
- Coat of Arms of the Colombian Navy
- Active: September 17, 1810 - Present
- Country: Colombia
- Branch: Navy
- Role: Protection of the seas and rivers of Colombia
- Garrison/HQ: Colombian Ministry of Defense
- Motto: Plus Ultra (Latin: further beyond)

The tables below present a view of the decommissioned ships of the Colombian Navy.

The Colombian Navy was first formed in 1810 during the war of independence, exiled during the Spanish reconquest in 1815 and returned in 1819 during the successful rebellion of Simon Bolivar. Many major units were lost in 1830 on the separation of Venezuela and Ecuador, including her frigates and corvettes. In 1843 the navy was ordered to be suppressed, what ships remained came under the command of the army until 1860-67 when a formal navy returned during and after the 1860-62 Colombian Civil War. In 1867 the navy was decreed to be sold again, standing naval forces consisting only of the coastguard and steamers for interior work, with armies of both sides expropriating or seizing ships during the numerous civil wars of 1860, 1876, 1885, and 1895. The few ships that were bought were quickly sold after conflict had ended and contract steamers were operated for short periods sometimes by individual states. The navy was reformed around the cruiser Cordoba acquired in 1896 and had a major role in the 1899-1902 civil war. With the last of the cruisers sold in 1916 the navy reverted to a coastguard and river service until it saw a rapid expansion for the 1932-33 Peru-Colombia War.

== Cruisers ==
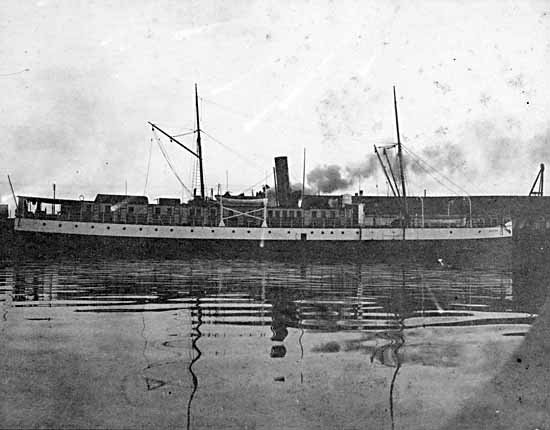
Bogota seen shortly before purchase by Colombia. She was specifically acquired to hunt down the rebel Almirante Padilla

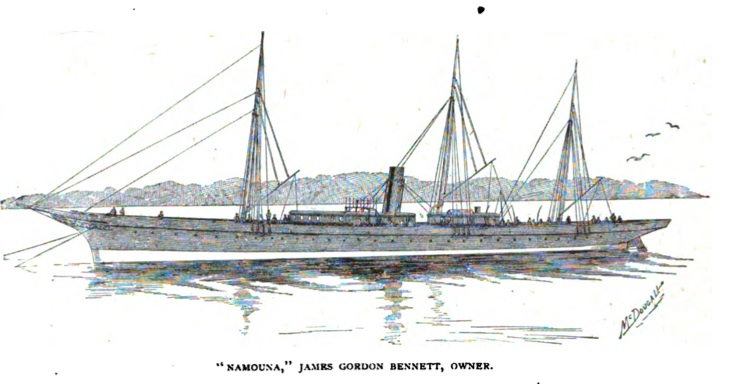
The Namouna was transformed into the Colombian cruiser General Próspero Pinzón, fitted with one 14 pounder and four 6 pounder QF

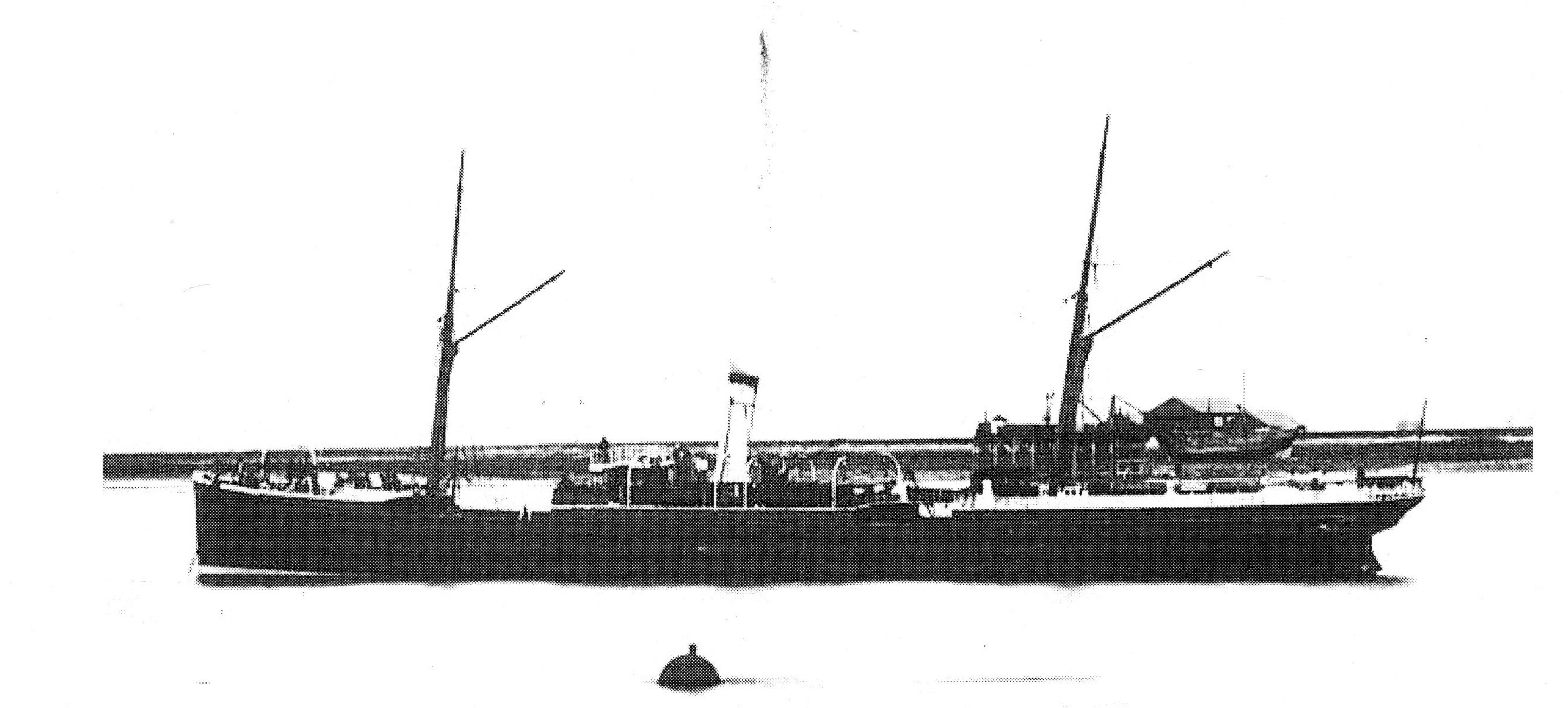
Presidente Marroquin was initially lent to Venezuelan rebels as the Libertador fitted with four 3.9 inch QF

These vessels were all rated as crucero in Colombian government records, but with the exception of Cartagena are often given as gunboats in European records.

Type	Name	Construction	Year built	Commission	Retirement	Notes
Screw						
Cruiser	General José Maria Córdoba	Osbourne Graham, Sunderland	1871	1896	1903	ex-Neptuno. British-built iron steamer rebuilt as cruiser at New Jersey in 1895-96, with shielded guns, searchlights and fighting top. Sold, 1 May 1903
Cruiser	General Próspero Pinzon	Ward, Stanton & Co., New York	1882	1901	1916	ex-Namouna. Formerly James Gordon Bennett Jr.'s iron steam yacht. Fitted out as cruiser in New York in 1901. Sold, 14 November 1916
Cruiser	Presidente Marroquin (ex-Bolívar)	John Elder & Co, Govan	1870	1901	1916	ex-Ban Righ. Bought and lent to Venezuelan rebels as Libertador. Fitted with guns and protection to engine, steering and bridge. Returned September 1902. Later served as training ship. Sold, 14 November 1916
Torpedo Cruiser	Cartagena (ex-Almirante Lezo)	Orlando, Livorno, Italy	1894	1902	1916	ex-Moroccan El Bashir et Telam Bekanefekel-Zalam, delivered July 1902. Refitted in Havana, 1912. Sold, 14 November 1916
Cruiser	Bogotá	James Brunner & Co., Hull	1884	1902	1914	ex-yacht Cutch, ex-Jessie Banning. Purchased 2 August 1902, and fitted as cruiser at Risdon Works, San Francisco. Later served as transport, sold 1914.
Cruiser	21 de Noviembre (ex-Almirante Padilla)	Charles J. Bigger, Foyle, Londonderry	1888	1902	1903	ex-Ivy. Cargo coaster purchased by rebels by September 1901, and heavily armed as the Almirante Padilla. Surrendered, October 1902. To Panama, 6 November 1903

== Gunboats ==
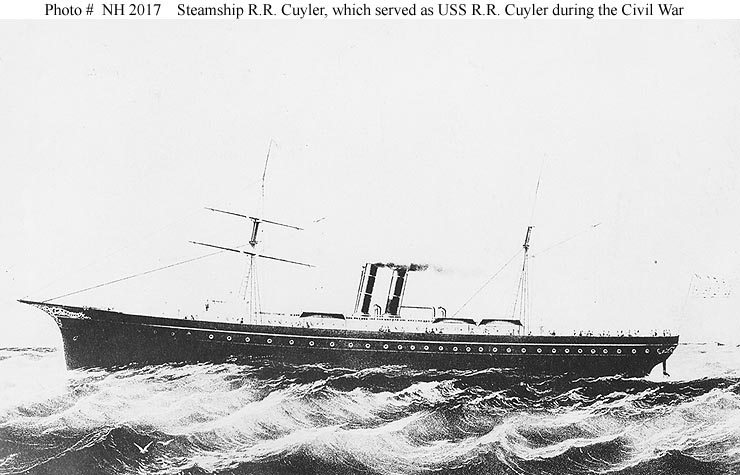
The large Colombian war steamer Rayo as R.R. Cuyler. She served 1866-67 and fitted with six 9in Dahlgrens and two 30pdr Parrots

Type	Name	Construction	Year built	Commission	Retirement	Notes
Paddle						
Iron war steamer	Cuaspud	J. & G. Rennie, Greenwich, England	1864	1866	1867	ex-Witch iron paddle-steamer built 1864 by Rennie, and bought June 1866. Foundered off Trinidad & Tobago, 23 September 1867
Steel river gunboat	Hércules	United States	1884	1884	1928	Built as government tug and dredger. Converted to gunboat and armed 1895, then armoured in 1898. Served until exploded at Sitionuevo, 16 June 1928
Steel river gunboat	General Nariño	Hugh Ramsay, Perth Amboy, New Jersey	1896	1896	1898	Built in sections, shipped and rebuilt at Barranquilla. Not a success and dismantled 1898
Steel river gunboat	Esperanza	Hugh Ramsay, Perth Amboy, New Jersey	1897	1897	1897	Sister of General Nariño, but not recorded in any Colombian source, may never have been delivered
Steel river gunboat	Presidente Mosquera (ex-Colombia)	-	1912	1912	1957	Became school for mechanics and boys by 1955, sunk at moorings 28 November 1957
Screw						
Iron war steamer	Colombia	C. & W. Earle, Hull, England	1865	1866	1868	ex-Sirius, bought January 1866. Also given as "corvette". Sold as Scandinavian to Anchor Line on 12 December 1868
Iron war steamer	Bolívar	Palmers, Jarrow, England	1866	1866	1872	Launched 14 July 1866. Sold to S. McNider, 2 July 1872
Wooden war steamer	Rayo	Samuel Sneeden, New York	1860	1866	1867	ex- R. R. Cuyler. Bought December 1866. Wrecked at Cartagena, 12 September 1867
Iron gunboat	Vijilante	Yarrow & Hedleys, Isle of Dogs, London	1874	1874	1878	Coast guard steamer, launched June 1874. Taken by rebels July 1875. Discarded after 1878
Iron gunboat	Boyacá (ex-Colombia)	Pusey & Jones, Wilmington, Delaware	1883	1883	1903	Coast guard gunboat. Captured by rebels 13 July 1902, lost at Port Bethsabe, 16 Feb 1903
Iron gunboat	La Popa	Pusey & Jones, Wilmington, Delaware	1887	1887	1901	Coast guard gunboat. Launched 5 October 1887. Lost 21 August 1901 off Sabanilla
Gunboat	Cauca (ex-Carlos Albán, ex-General Ricardo Gaitán Obeso)	-	-	1900	1903	Bought by rebels March 1900. Captured by government 4 December 1900 but recaptured. To Panama 6 November 1903
Gunboat	Panama (ex-Darién)	-	-	1901	1903	Bought 17 June 1901. Seized by rebels 4 November 1901, returned 21 November 1902. To Panama 6 November 1903
Steel gunboat	Chucuito	Wigham Richardson & Co., Newcastle	1896	1902	1903	Ex-Chiriqui, purchased 16 January 1902. To Panama 6 November 1903, and sold 3 November 1904
Patrol gunboat	Carabobo	C. A. de St. Nazaire-Penhoet, Rouen	1925	1925	1950	Coastguard and later river patrol vessel, launched, 8 August 1925. Discarded, 1950
Patrol gunboat	Junín (ex-Boyacá)	C. A. de St. Nazaire-Penhoet, Rouen	1925	1925	1950	Coastguard and later patrol vessel, launched 8 July 1925. Discarded, 1950
Patrol gunboat	Pichincha	C. A. de St. Nazaire-Penhoet, Rouen	1925	1925	1950	Coastguard and later river patrol vessel, launched 5 September 1925. Discarded, 1950
River gunboat	Cartagena	Yarrow, Scotstoun, Glasgow	1930	1931	1985	Launched 26 March 1930, stricken 1985
River gunboat	Santa Marta	Yarrow, Scotstoun, Glasgow	1930	1931	1963	Launched 16 April 1930, stricken 1963
River gunboat	Barranquilla	Yarrow, Scotstoun, Glasgow	1930	1931	1969	Launched 10 May 1930, stricken 1969
Patrol gunboat	Bogotá	Tecklenborg, Geestemunde, Germany	1919	1932	1936	Former German minesweeper, ex-Tonsberg I, ex-Helgoland, ex-M140. Ran aground and sunk off Isla de Manzanillo, 1936
Patrol gunboat	Córdoba	Nordseewerke, Emden, Germany	1920	1932	1937	Former German minesweeper, ex-Dixmude, ex-Dinard, ex-Grille, ex-M140. Sunk in gunnery exercises, 11 June 1937
Patrol gunboat	Mariscal Sucre	Yarrow & Co. Ltd., Glasgow	1909	1933	1961	Former yacht, ex-Flying Fox, ex-Winchester. Naval school 6 December 1948, stricken 1955 and scrapped 1961

== Armed & Government Steamers ==
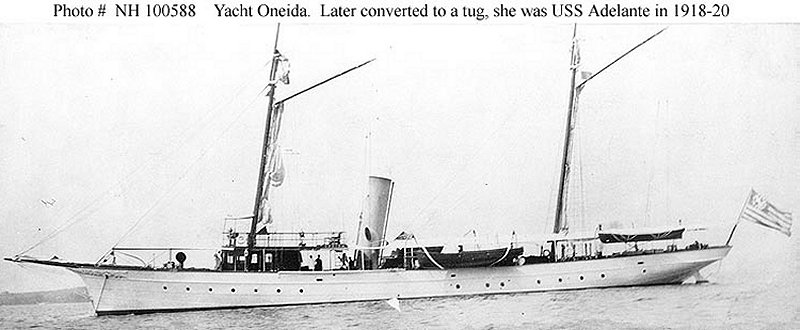
The armed yacht Utowana briefly named the Colombia but returned to her owners without seeing service after the 1885 civil war

Type	Name	Construction	Year built	Commission	Retirement	Notes
Paddle						
Armed river steamer	Panamá (ex-Colon)	New York	-	1860	1861	ex-Laura Frances, ex-Liberty. Purchased and fitted out by Government February 1860, discarded after 1861
Armed river steamer	Colombia	-	1861	1861	1867	ex-Ospina. Purchased by Government 1861, abandoned at Barranquilla 1867
Armed river steamer	General López (ex-Joaquin Rizo)	-	1860	1861	1863	ex-G.M. Totten. Taken by rebels 18 November 1861, then purchased by Government, 12 December 1862. Discarded by 1863
Armed iron river steamer	Jeneral Sántos Gutiérrez (ex-Jeneral Riáscos, ex- Tequendama)	-	1862	1875	1878	Seized by rebels 21 July 1875, and armed and armoured as Jeneral Riascos. Government Magdalena flotilla 1876-77, purchased early 1877 as Jeneral Santos Gutiérrez. Sold 13 June 1878
Armed river dredger	Cristobal Colón	Pusey & Jones, Wilmington, Delaware	1879	1882	1899	Dredging steamer bought by government in 1882. Captured and armed by rebels January to August 1885. Captured again by rebels October 1899 and armoured as a ram. Sunk 24 October 1899
Armed river dredger	Magdalena	Pusey & Jones, Wilmington, Delaware	1880	1882	1898	Small dredging steamer bought by government in 1882. Captured by rebels 19 January 1885, retaken armed and armoured by August 1885. Possibly the same Magdalena serving as warship in 1895-98
River steamer	Simón Bolívar	-	1892	1892	1916	Government dredger. Served to at least August 1916
River steamer	Vigilante	-	1896	1898	1904	Government police steamer. Served to at least December 1904
River steamer	Ayacucho	-	1897	1898	1904	Government dredger. Taken and scuttled by rebels 18 October 1899, raised the next day. Served to at least December 1904
River steamer	Concordia	-	1906	1906	1922	Government river dredger. Served to at least 1922 when described as a part of the navy
River steamer	Magdalena	-	1907	1907	1922	Government river dredger. Served to at least 1922 when described as a part of the navy
River steamer	Girardot	-	-	1914	1922	Government river steamer. Served to at least 1922 when described as a part of the navy
River steamer	Nariño	-	-	1916	1922	Government river steamer. Served to at least 1922 when described as a part of the navy
Screw						
Screw tug	General Nariño	Pusey & Jones, Wilmington, Delaware	1877	1877	1887	Revenue service steamer. Captured by rebels February 1885 until at least May 1885. Extant 1887
Screw tug	General Maza	Pusey & Jones, Wilmington, Delaware	1877	1877	1877	Revenue service steamer. Sank on delivery voyage Nassau, 3 Oct 1877
Screw tug	General Padilla	Pusey & Jones, Wilmington, Delaware	1878	1878	1885	Armed government tug. Captured by rebels February 1885 until at least May 1885
Screw tug	General José María Córdoba	Pusey & Jones, Wilmington, Delaware	1880	1878	1887	Armed government tug, ex-Meteor. Captured by rebels February 1885 until at least April 1885. Extant 1887
Armed iron yacht	Colombia (ex-Utowana)	John Roach & Sons, Chester, Pennsylvania	1883	1885	1885	Reported purchased by Colombia 19 August 1885, but returned to owners after rebel surrender
Armed steamer	Cauca	-	-	1885	1886	Bought by July 1885, possibly the Arran. Given away 6 September 1886, and renamed Soledad
Armed steamer	Ocho de Mayo	-	-	1885	1886	Coast guard steamer. Acquired by December 1885, possibly the ex-Rebel Aden. Given away 22 September 1886
Screw tug	Miguel Antonio Caro	-	-	1892	1899	First recorded 1892 as owned by the nation, and listed as part of the navy in 1898. Extant until at least August 1899. Presumed a screw tug
Screw tug	Nelly Gazán	Philadelphia, United States	1899	1899	1907	Government service since October 1899, armed by 1902. Sold 22 Feb 1907
Armed steel steamer	Medellín	Laird Bros., Birkenhead	1878	1902	1903	Variously described as transport and cruiser. Likely the ex-Poas, ex-Casma purchased from Costa Rica in September 1902. To Panama 6 November 1903, and sold 3 November 1904

== Contract & Impressed Steamers ==
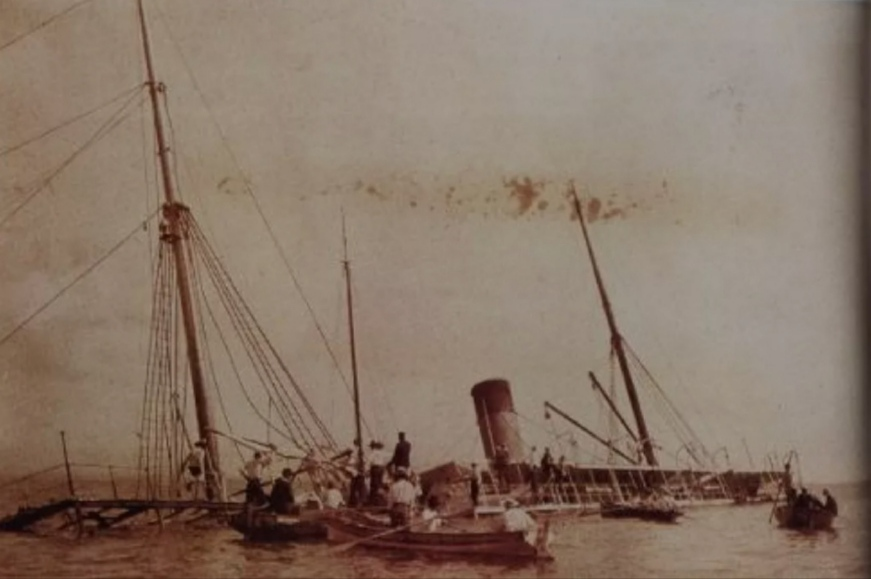
The Lautaro sinking in Panama Bay after action with the rebel Almirante Padilla, 20 January 1902

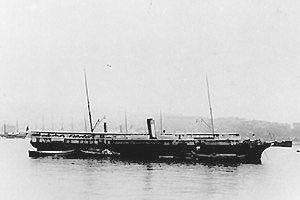
Lautaro was the former Chilean transport Rímac appropriated from the Compañía Sud Americana de Vapores

These vessels were not owned by the Colombian government, but were contract steamers, expropriated by government, or seized or acquired by revolutionary forces during the numerous Colombian civil wars of the mid and late 19th century.

Type	Name	Construction	Year built	Commission	Retirement	Notes
Paddle						
Armed iron river steamer	Unión	James & William Napier, Glasgow	1839	1841	1841	Launched 22 January 1839. Taken up and armed by government 11 June 1841, destroyed by rebel bongos 20 November 1841
Armed river steamer	Calamar	Hudson River, New York	1852	1854	1854	Stern paddle. Built 1851-52. Taken up and armed by rebels June, 1854
Armed river steamer	Antioquia	-	1856	1865	1885	First seized by Magdalena State 1865-66, then rebels 1867, government 1877, rebels again January to July 1885 then armed and armoured Government July to August 1885
Armed river steamer	Vencedor	-	1856	1867	1867	Taken up by government as a warship from May to August 1867
Armed wooden river steamer	Confianza	-	1865	1867	1885	First taken up 1867. Armed as part of the Magdalena flotilla 1875-77, and again in 1883. Taken and armed by rebels January to August 1885.
Armed wooden river steamer	Colombia	-	1873	1875	1879	Armed in Magdalena flotilla, August 1875. Armoured by August 1876, and still in use June 1879
Armed river steamer	Murillo (ex-Veintiseis de Julio)	-	1870	1875	1877	Seized by rebels 21 July 1875, and armed and armoured as 26 de Julio. Served government 1876-77 as a warship
Armed wooden river steamer	Simón Bolívar	-	1865	1875	1877	First taken up and armed by government August 1875, and again 1876-77. Lost Magdalena River, 3 July 1879
Armed iron river steamer	Tenerife (ex-Isabel)	-	1870	1875	1885	Seized by rebels 21 July 1875, and armed and armoured as Tenerife. Served government 1877. Taken by rebels in January 1885 and returned 21 August 1885
Armed river steamer	Jeneral Nieto (ex-Vijilante, ex-Vengoechea)	-	1864	1875	1876	Seized by rebels 21 July 1875, and armed and armoured as Vijilante. Government service as Jeneral Nieto, August to December 1876
Armed steamer	Constitución	-	-	1877	1877	Government service as warship in 1877, presumably a river steamer
Armed steel river steamer	Stephenson Clarke	-	1877	1879	1885	Government service as warship in 1879 and armed again 1883. Seized by rebels in January 1885 for a short period
Armed iron river steamer	Once de Febrero (ex-Luciano Restrepo, ex-Maria Emma, ex-Medellin)	-	1875	1877	1885	First taken up 1877 as Francia Elena. Captured and armed by rebels January 1885, renamed Luciano Restrepo then Once de Febrero, destroyed by fire 17 June 1885
Armed river steamer	José Maria Pino	-	-	1879	1885	Ex-Santa Catalina. Armed in war by national government 1879. Seized by rebels January 1885 to July 1885. May have been the ex-Vengoechea
Armed river steamer	Rafael Nùñez	-	-	1882	1889	Armed by Bolivar State 1882. Government flotilla from March 1885 to as late as 1889 as aviso, tug and yacht
Armed river steamer	Victoria	James Rees and Sons, Pittsburgh	1880	1882	1885	Armed by Bolivar State 1882. Government flotilla from January 1885 and returned 3 December 1885
Armed river steamer	Lebrija	James Rees and Sons, Pittsburgh	1885	1885	1885	Built 1884-85. In government flotilla and armed March 1885, and operated until at least August 1885
Armed wooden river steamer	Unión	-	-	1885	1885	In government flotilla and March 1885. Captured by rebels 19 April 1885, and operated until scuttled at El Banco on 15 September 1885.
Armed iron river steamer	Bismarck	-	-	1885	1901	Taken by rebels in January 1885 and armed. Returned 28 August 1885. Taken up by government in 1895 and 1901
Armed steel river steamer	América (ex-General Trujillo)	-	1877	1885	1897	As General Trujillo taken by rebels in January 1885 and armed, and recovered by government. Served as government warship again as América in 1895 and 1897
Armed steel river steamer	Libertador	-	1878	1885	1885	Armed by government June to August 1885, and extensively damaged in collision with the Confianza
Armed river steamer	Mariscal Sucre	-	1882	1885	1885	Taken by rebels January to July 1885. Armed by government August 1885, and later lost on Juana Sanchez Point 16 March 1889
Armed steel river steamer	Argentina (ex-Cometa)	-	1880	1885	1895	As Cometa taken by rebels January 1885, armed and operated until 23 August 1885. Served as warship again as Argentina in 1895
Armed steel river steamer	Francisco Montoya	James Rees and Sons, Pittsburgh	1879	1885	1896	Taken by rebels March 1885, armed and operated until 31 August 1885. Served government as a warship in 1896. Lost in fire October 1899
Armed river steamer	Cartagena	-	-	1885	1885	Seized by rebels 1 January 1885 and armed, and returned 7 December 1885
Armed river steamer	Enrique	-	1891	1895	1902	Served as warship 1895, and armed again by September 1902
Armed river steamer	Nechí	-	-	1895	1902	First served as warship February 1895, and served again from 1899 until wrecked on military operations, 16 February 1902
Armed river steamer	Jose Manuel Goenaga	-	-	1895	1895	Armed by government for the 1895 civil war
Armed river steamer	Miguel Samper	James Rees & Sons, Pittsburgh	1892	1895	1895	Served as government warship in 1895 civil war
Armed river steamer	Eloísa (ex-Once de Noviembre)	-	1896	1899	1900	Served as government warship, returned 31 December 1900
Armed river steamer	Colombia	-	-	1899	1902	Armed in government flotilla, October 1899. May have been the Colombia that served until 1902
Armed river steamer	General Sarmiento (ex-María Hanabergh)	Nixon Bethlehem Steel Company, Elizabethport, New Jersey	1896	1900	1900	Armed and armoured by government. Captured by rebels June 1900 and renamed General Sarmiento. Wrecked Tucacos Lagoon, July 1900
Screw						
Armed Steamer	Montijo	United States	-	1868	1871	Taken up by Panama State for revolution of 1868 and armed, then returned. Seized by rebels 6 April 1871
Iron armed steamer	Morro	Scott & Co., Greenock	1881	1884	1895	Successively taken by rebels and government in October 1884 and armed. May have also been the Morro armed in Cauca in 1895
Iron armed steamer	Alajuela	San Francisco	1878	1884	1884	ex-Thomas Whitelaw. Costa Rican steamer captured by rebels 15 October 1884. Later destroyed in Ecuador 6 December 1884
Armed iron tug	General Gaitan (ex-Gamecock)	John Softley & Sons, South Shields	1880	1885	1885	Seized by rebels in February 1885 and armed and shielded. Captured by the US 6 August 1885
Armed tug	Salvador Camacho Roldán	-	-	1885	1885	Acquired by rebels in February 1885. Active until at least May 1885 when arrested by the British
Armed steamer	General Antonio B. Cuervo	-	-	1897	1898	Armed merchant ship, last recorded September 1898
Gunboat	General Gaitan	-	1894	1900	1900	ex-tug Augusto. Rebel gunboat acquired by May 1900, interned 12 July 1900. Became Venezuelan Zumbador
Gunboat	Peralonso	-	-	1900	1900	ex-Rayo. Rebel gunboat acquired by May 1900, interned 12 July 1900. Became Venezuelan Margarita
Iron armed tug	Ancón	-	-	1900	1900	Taken up by government by May 1900, fought the rebel Ricardo Gaitán on 16 May 1900. Later returned to owners
Steel armed steamer	Taboga	Wigham Richardson & Co, Newcastle	1896	1900	1900	Sister to the Chucuito. Taken up by government at least May to December 1900 as armed transport. Reported purchased in November 1900, appeared in nascent Panamanian navy November 1903
Wooden armed steamer	Telégrafo	-	Before 1895	1900	1901	Small schooner-rigged steamer. Part of government Pacific flotilla by May 1900 to at least November 1901 when briefly captured by rebels
Armed steamer	Lautaro (ex-Rímac)	R. & J. Evans & Co., Liverpool	1872	1902	1902	Appropriated by government 14 January 1902 and heavily armed. Sunk by the rebel cruiser Almirante Padilla 20 January 1902
Armed steel lighter	Clapet	Palmers Shipbuilding & Iron Co. Ltd, Jarrow	1887	1902	1902	Former dredger of French Canal Project, ex-Lighter No.8, acquired as gunboat by January 1902. Returned 8 November 1902

== Oceanic combat ==
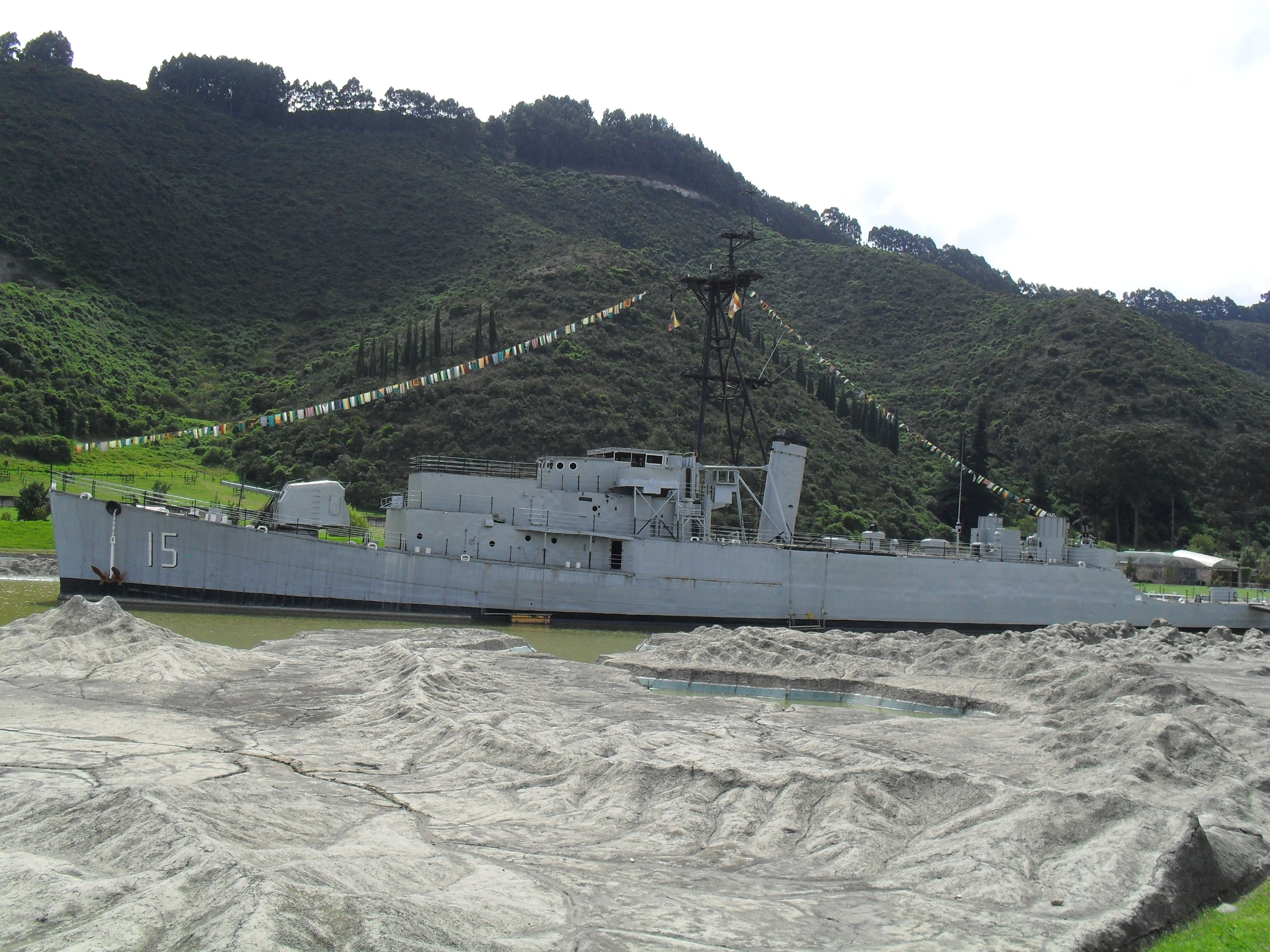
USS Ruchamkin (APD-89) (ARC Córdoba (DT-15)) on display at Jaime Duque Park, Tocancipá, Colombia

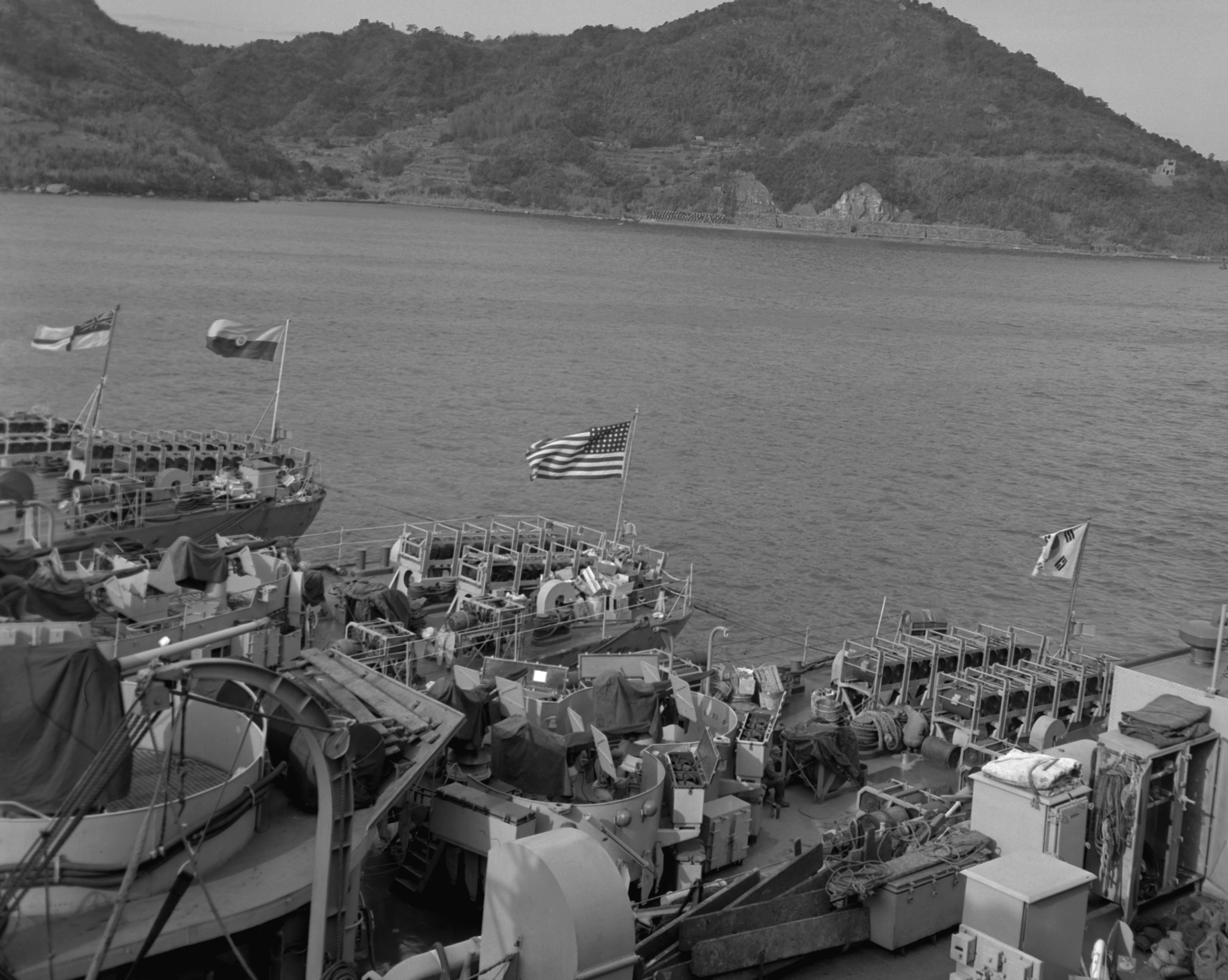
ARC Almirante Padilla (F-11) (2nd from left) docked alongside USS Jason (ARH-1) at the Han Estuary in South Korea on 16 January 1952, along with

Role	Group	Class	Name	Number	Construction	Commission	Retirement	Notes
Destroyer								
Destroyer	D							
Destroyer	D	Halland	ARC 20 de Julio	D-05	Sweden	1958	1986	scrapped
Destroyer	D	Halland	ARC 7 de Agosto	D-06	Sweden	1958	1986	scrapped
Destroyer	DD							
Destroyer	DD	Fletcher	ARC Antioquia	DD-01	United States	1961	1973	fmr. USS Hale (DD-642); scrapped; "Hale". DANFS.
Destroyer	DD	Allen M. Sumner	ARC Caldas	DD-02	United States	1972	1977	fmr. USS Willard Keith (DD-775); scrapped; "Willard Keith". DANFS.
Destroyer	DD	Allen M. Sumner	ARC Santander	DD-03	United States	1973	1986	fmr. USS Waldron (DD-699); scrapped; "Waldron". DANFS.
Destroyer	DD	Antioquia	ARC Antioquia		Portugal	1934	1960	Scrapped
Destroyer	DD	Antioquia	ARC Caldas		Portugal	1934	1960	Scrapped
Destroyer	DE							
Destroyer	DE	Dealey	ARC Boyacá	DE-16	United States	1972	1994	fmr. USS Hartley (DE-1029); preserved as museum ship at Guatapé; "Hartley". DANFS.
Destroyer	DT							
Destroyer	DT	Crosley	ARC Almirante Padilla	DT-03	United States	1965	1973	fmr. USS Tollberg (APD-103); scrapped; "Tollberg". DANFS.
Destroyer	DT	Charles Lawrence	ARC Almirante Tono	DT-04	United States	1968	unknown	fmr. USS Bassett (APD-73); fate unknown; "Bassett". DANFS.
Destroyer	DT	Charles Lawrence	ARC Almirante Brión	DT-07	United States	1968	1974	fmr. USS Burke (DE-215); scrapped; "Burke". DANFS.
Destroyer	DT	Crosley	ARC Cordoba	DT-15	United States	1969	1980	fmr. USS Ruchamkin (APD-89); Preserved on display as museum ship at "Parque Jaime Duque", Tocancipá. "Ruchamkin". DANFS.
Frigate								
Frigate	F							
Frigate	F	Tacoma	ARC Almirante Padilla	F-11	United States	1947	unknown	fmr. USS Groton (PF-29); fate unknown; "Groton". DANFS.
Frigate	F	Tacoma	ARC Almirante Brión	F-14	United States	1953	1968	fmr. USS Burlington (PF-51); scrapped; "Burlington". DANFS.
Frigate	F	Tacoma	ARC Capitán Tono	F-06	United States	1952	1963	fmr. USS Bisbee (PF-46); scrapped

== Coast Guard ==
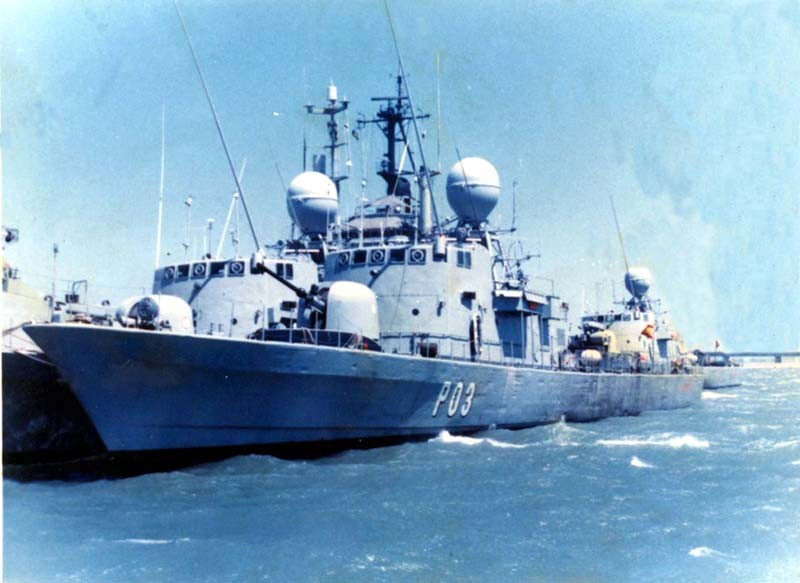
ARC Jorge E Marquez Durán; Photo taken during its service as Patrullero Cardasó (P-03) in the Spanish Navy

Role	Group	Class	Ship Name	Number	Construction	Commission	Retirement	Notes (Note: Note that the roles Offshore patrol vs. Coastal patrol are not standardized across different navies. For the purposes of this article, the OP vessel is considered the heavier and more oceanic role, with significantly more range or endurance, drawing the line arbitrarily at a displacement of roughly 200 tonnes vs. the CP. Nevertheless, many CP vessels are capable of oceanic navigation within reason, and OP vessels are also routinely used in coastal patrol missions.)
Offshore Offshore Patrol vessels, long range or endurance
Offshore	PO							PO: Oceanic Patrol (Spanish: Patrullero Oceánico)
Offshore	PO	Lazaga	ARC Capitán Pablo José de Porto	PO-42	Spain	1993	2009	Sunk as part of training exercises.
Offshore	PO	Lazaga	ARC CTCIM. Jorge E. Marquez Duran	PO-43	Spain	1993	2011	Retired and awaiting final disposition.
Offshore Coast Patrol vessels, shorter range or endurance
Coastal	PC							PC: Coastal Patrol (Spanish: Patrullero Costero)
Coastal	PC	Point	ARC Cabo Manglares	PC-142	United States	2000	2020	fmr. USGCG Point Warde

== Training, Auxiliary & Logistics ==
Role	Group	Class	Ship Name	Number	Construction	Commission	Retirement	Notes
Logistics								
Logistics	BT							BT (Spanish: Buque Tanquero) Tanker vessel
Logistics	BT	Mettawee	ARC Blas de Lezo	BT-62	United States	1947-11-26	1965	fmr. USS Kalamazoo (AOG-30); final fate unknown; "Kalamazoo". DANFS.
Logistics	BT	Tonti	ARC Mamonal	BT-62	United States	1965	1976	fmr. USNS Tonti (T-AOG-76); scrapped; "Tonti". DANFS.
Logistics	BT	Patapsco	ARC Tumaco	BT-7	United States	1976	unknown	fmr. USS Chewaucan (AOG-50) final fate unknown, presumed scrapped; "Chewaucan". DANFS.
Logistics	BH							BH (Spanish: Buque Hidrográfico) Hydrographic Vessel
Logistics	BH		ARC Quindio	BH-153	United States	1963	2015	fmr. YFR-443 (USA). Scuttled as diving reef off Isla Barú on 13 November 2015.
Logistics	LD							LD (Spanish: Lancha de Desembarco) Landing Craft
Logistics	LD	LCU-1466	ARC Bahia Solano	251	United States		2020	
