= NRP Douro =

NRP Douro is the name of the following ships of the Portuguese Navy

- NRP Douro (1913), a Guadiana-class destroyer broken up in 1931
- NRP Douro (1932), a Douro-class destroyer, sold to Colombia before completion and commissioned as ARC Antioquia
- NRP Douro (D332), a Douro-class destroyer commissioned in 1936, stricken in 1959
- NRP Douro (P591), ex-HDMS Ravnen, a Flyvefisken-class patrol vessel acquired by Portugal in 2014 and commissioned in 2015

== See also ==
- Douro (disambiguation)
