= NRP Tejo =

NRP Tejo is the name of the following ships of the Portuguese Navy:

- NRP Tejo (1904), Portugal's first destroyer, scrapped in 1927
- NRP Tejo (1933), a Douro-class destroyer sold to Colombia before completion and commissioned as ARC Caldas
- NRP Tejo (D335), a Douro-class destroyer commissioned in 1935, stricken in 1965
- NRP Tejo (P590), ex-HDMS Viben, a Flyvefisken-class patrol vessel acquired in 2014

== See also ==
- Tejo (disambiguation)
