= ARC Antioquia =

ARC Antioquia is the name of the following ships of the Colombian Navy:

- ARC Antioquia (1932), first of two Antioquia-class destroyers, in commission 1934–1960
- ARC Antioquia (DD-01), ex-USS Hale (DD-642), a Fletcher-class destroyer, acquired in 1961, stricken in 1973
- ARC Antioquia (FM-53), an Almirante Padilla-class frigate in commission since 1984

== See also ==
- Antioquia (disambiguation)
