= Douro (disambiguation) =

The Douro is a major river of the Iberian Peninsula.

Douro may also refer to:

== Places ==
- Douro DOC, a Portuguese wine region
- Douro Subregion, a Portuguese subregion
- Douro Province, a historical province of Portugal
- Douro is a community within the township of Douro-Dummer in Ontario, Canada

== Other uses ==
- RMS Douro, British ship 1865–1882
- NRP Douro (1913), a Portuguese destroyer in service from 1915 to 1931
- NRP Douro (1932), a Portuguese destroyer sold to Colombia before completion and renamed ARC Antioquia (1932)
- NRP Douro (D332), a Portuguese destroyer in service from 1936 to 1959

== See also ==
- Alto Douro (disambiguation)
- Douro Litoral Province
- Duero, Bohol, a municipality in the Philippines
