= Alto Douro =

Alto Douro may refer to:

- Alto Douro, São Tomé and Príncipe
- Alto Douro Wine Company
- Alto Douro (region), region in Portugal
- Douro DOC, a Portuguese wine region

== See also ==
- Douro (disambiguation)
