= USNS Tonti =

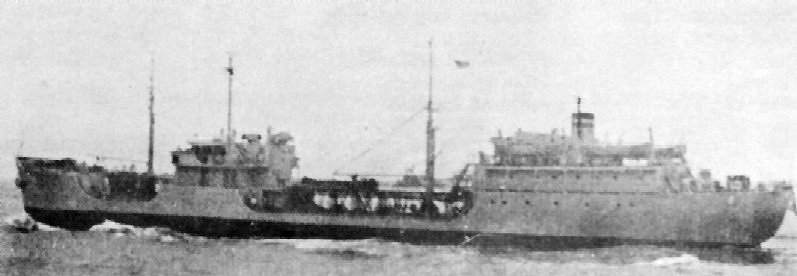
- ARC Mamonal (ex-USNS Tonti) underway, date unknown

History

United States
- Name: USNS Tonti (T-AOG-76)
- Namesake: Henry de Tonti
- Builder: Todd-Houston Shipbuilding Corporation; Houston, Texas
- Laid down: 16 May 1945 as Tavern
- Launched: 23 August 1945
- Sponsored by: Mrs. E. Bornkman
- Completed: December 1945
- Acquired: 24 June 1948
- In service: 24 June 1948
- Out of service: July 1960
- Fate: transferred to National Defense Reserve Fleet, July 1960

History

Colombia
- Name: ARC Mamonal (BT-62)
- Acquired: 13 January 1965
- Fate: Scrapped, 1975

General characteristics (as USNS Tonti)
- Class & type: Tonti-class gasoline tanker
- Displacement: 2,022 long tons (2,054 t) (light)
- Length: 325 ft (99 m)
- Beam: 48 ft (15 m)
- Draft: 19 ft (5.8 m)
- Propulsion: 1 × diesel engine
- Speed: 10 knots (19 km/h)
- Complement: 38

USNS Tonti (T-AOG-76) was a T1 tanker type, Tonti-class gasoline tanker, in operation for the United States Navy from 1948 through 1960. She was originally constructed as MS Tavern for the United States Maritime Commission at the end of World War II, and intended for delivery to the United Kingdom under the terms of Lend-Lease. Although her construction was suspended in August 1945 after the war's end, the ship, renamed Tonti after an early explorer of North America, was completed in December 1945. From June 1948 to July 1960, the tanker was operated by a private company on behalf of the U.S. Navy. After being laid up in 1960, the ship was transferred to Colombia in January 1965. As ARC Mamonal (BT-62), she served the Colombian Navy until 1975, when she was scrapped.

== Career ==
Tonti (AOG-76)—originally slated for use by the British under the terms of the Lend-Lease Program— was laid down under a United States Maritime Commission contract (MC hull 2648) as Tavern on 16 May 1945 by the Todd-Houston Shipbuilding Corporation of Houston, Texas. She was sponsored by Mrs. E. Bornkman and launched on 23 August 1945. Work on completing the ship was suspended on 26 August 1945.

Work was subsequently resumed, and the vessel was completed in December 1945. Apparently named Tonti by the Maritime Commission at this time after explorer Henry de Tonti, the ship was leased on 24 June 1948 at Orange, Texas, to the Marine Transport Lines. Operating at first under the supervision of the Naval Transportation Service and, after September 1949, under the auspices of the Military Sea Transportation Service, the gasoline tanker carried liquid cargoes for the U.S. Navy. She plied the waters of the Atlantic, the Caribbean, and the Gulf of Mexico, ranging as far north as the Labrador Sea. Tonti continued operations through the 1950s. In July 1960, she was returned to the custody of the United States Maritime Administration (a successor to the Martitime Commission) and placed in the National Defense Reserve Fleet. On 13 January 1965, the ship was transferred to the Colombian Navy under the "grant aid" program and served as Mamonal (BT-62) until 1975 when she was scrapped.
