= ARC Antioquia (1932) =

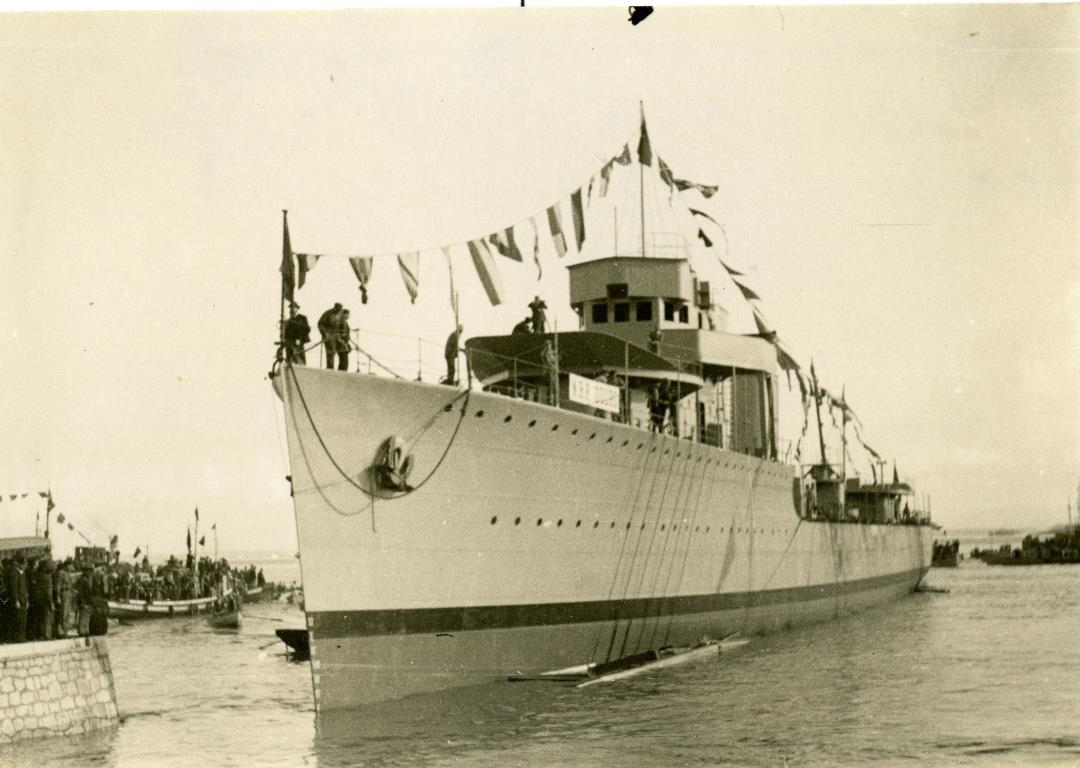

History

Colombia
- Name: Antioquia
- Namesake: Antioquia Department
- Builder: Lisbon Shipyard
- Launched: 10 May 1933
- Acquired: 1933
- Commissioned: 24 February 1934
- Decommissioned: 25 October 1960
- Refit: 1954
- Fate: Scrapped, November 1961

General characteristics (as built)
- Class & type: Antioquia-class destroyer
- Displacement: 1,219 long tons (1,239 t) (standard); 1,563 long tons (1,588 t) (full load)
- Length: 323 ft (98.5 m)
- Beam: 31 ft (9.4 m)
- Draught: 11 ft (3.4 m)
- Installed power: 3 × Yarrow boilers; 33,000 shp (25,000 kW)
- Propulsion: 2 shafts; 2 × geared steam turbines
- Speed: 36 knots (67 km/h; 41 mph)
- Range: 5,400 nmi (10,000 km; 6,200 mi) at 15 knots (28 km/h; 17 mph)
- Complement: 147
- Armament: 4 × single 4.7 in (120 mm) guns; 3 × single 2 pdr (40 mm (1.6 in)) AA guns; 2 × quadruple 21 in (533 mm) torpedo tubes; 2 × depth charge throwers; 12 depth charges; 20 × mines

ARC Antioquia was the name ship of her class of two destroyers built during the 1930s for the Armada Nacional República de Colombia. Originally ordered by the Portuguese Navy, they were purchased by Colombia while still under construction. Antioquia was discarded in 1960 and subsequently scrapped.

== Design and description ==
The Antioquia-class ships were designed by the British shipbuilder Yarrow and were based on Ambuscade, a prototype destroyer built for the Royal Navy in 1926 by Yarrow. They were 323 feet (98.45 m) long overall, with a beam of 31 feet (9.45 m) and a draught of 11 feet (3.35 m). The ships displaced 1,219 long tons (1,239 t) at standard load and 1,563 long tons (1,588 t) at full load.

The Antioquias were powered by two Parsons-Curtis geared steam turbines, each driving one propeller shaft using steam provided by three Yarrow boilers. The turbines, rated at 33,000 shaft horsepower (25,000 kW), were intended to give a maximum speed of 36 knots (67 km/h; 41 mph). The destroyers carried enough fuel oil to give them a range of 5,400 nautical miles (10,000 km; 6,200 mi) at 15 knots (28 km/h; 17 mph).

Armament was similar to contemporary Royal Navy destroyers, with a gun armament of four 4.7 in (120 mm) Vickers-Armstrongs Mk G guns, and three 2-pounder (40 mm (1.6 in)) Mk VIII anti-aircraft guns. Two quadruple banks of 21-inch (533 mm) torpedo tubes were carried, while two depth charge throwers and 12 depth charges constituted the ships' anti-submarine armament. Up to 20 mines could be carried. The ships' complement consisted of 147 officers and men.

== Construction and career ==
Antioquia was built in Lisbon, Portugal, as a Douro-class destroyer for the Portuguese Navy (the Marinha Portuguesa), and originally named NRP Douro. The design of the six ships of the Douro class was by the British company Yarrow Shipbuilders, based on that of the Royal Navy's prototype destroyer HMS Ambuscade. Two were built at Yarrow's shipyard in Clydebank, Scotland, and the remaining four in Lisbon with Yarrow machinery.

Douro was purchased before her completion by the Armada Nacional República de Colombia in 1933 in response to the Colombia–Peru War. She was renamed for Colombia's Antioquia Department, which had contributed the funds for her acquisition. A sister ship, NRP Tejo, was purchased at the same time and renamed ARC Caldas.

In 1936 Antioquia was involved in what could have been a serious international incident. On the occasion of the death of the British King, George V, the Bermuda Militia Artillery (BMA), a part-time reserve of the Royal Regiment of Artillery, had been instructed to fire a memorial salute from a 4.7 inch gun at St. David's Battery, in the British colony of Bermuda. This salute was to consist of seventy blank rounds, one for each year of the king's life, fired at one-minute intervals.

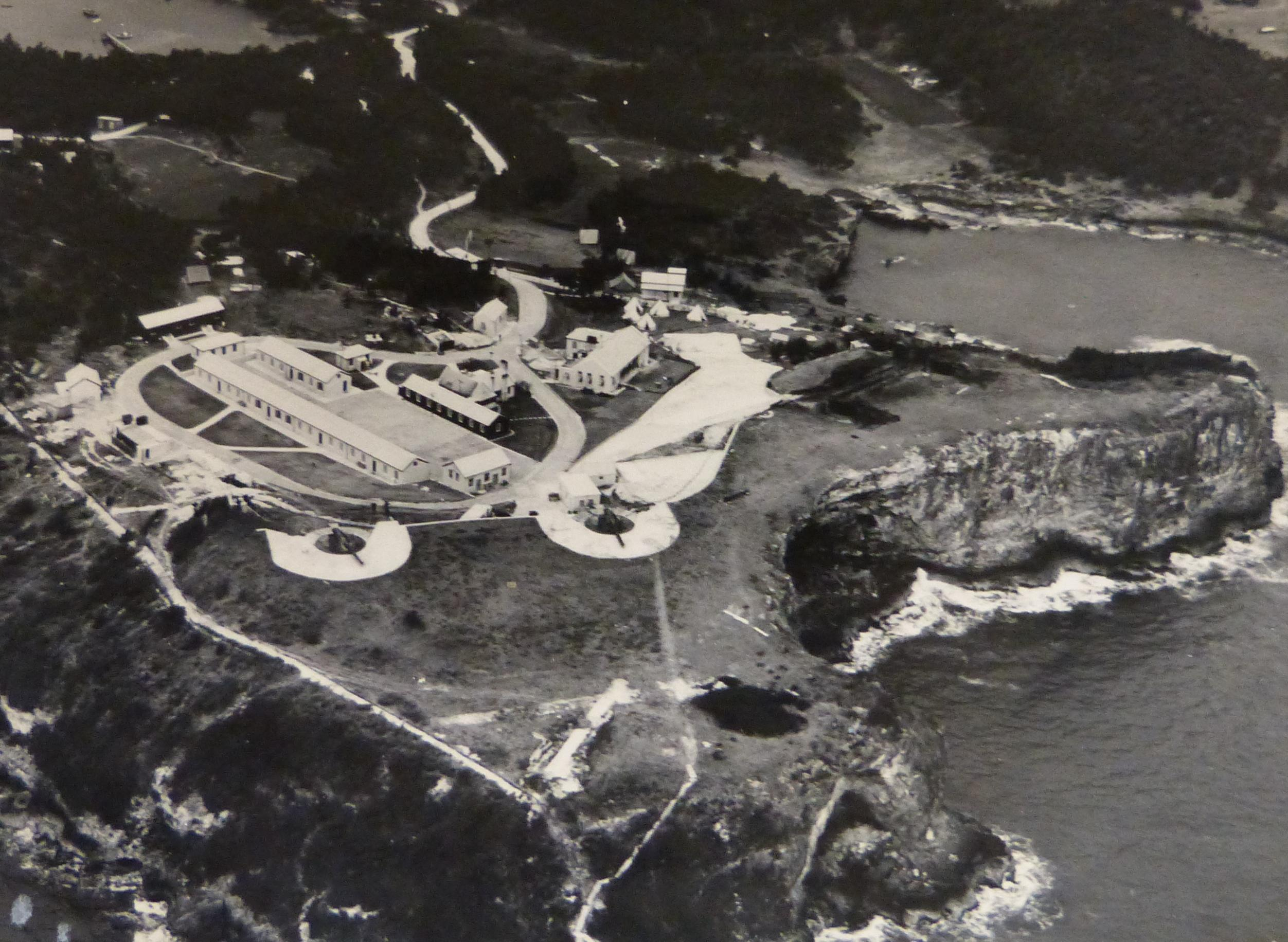
St. David's Battery, Bermuda.

Because of the difficulty of storing ammunition in Bermuda's humid climate, there proved to be only twenty-three blank rounds in stock, and the remainder used were all headed ammunition. As the firing was to commence at 08:00 (on 21 January), and it was thought unlikely any vessels would be in the danger area, it was decided to proceed with the salute, ensuring the guns were elevated for maximum range (8,000 yards (7,300 m)), out to sea. The firing began at 07:00, and was over seventy minutes later.

What the BMA gunners were unaware of, however, was that Antioquia was at the receiving end of their barrage. Antioquia was under the command of a retired Royal Naval officer (part of the British Naval Mission to Colombia), and was arriving at Bermuda to undergo repairs at the Royal Naval Dockyard. Although the ship's crewmembers were alarmed to find themselves under fire, the ship fortunately was not hit.

ARC Antioquia and ARC Caldas were both refitted in the United States, at Mobile, Alabama, in 1954, when three 5 inches (130 mm) guns were fitted, two forward and one aft. This had the effect of shifting their centres-of-gravity, resulting in poor handling in foul weather, which also over-stressed the hulls.

Antioquia was decommissioned in 1961, when the name passed to a Fletcher-class destroyer, built in 1943 for the US Navy as USS Hale. The current ARC Antioquia is an Almirante Padilla-class missile-armed frigate.

== Sources ==
- Griffith, Frank G. (1988). "Cover Photo and Miscellaneous comments". Warship International. XXV (2): 116. ISSN 0043-0374.
- Lyon, Hugh & Chumbley, Stephen (1995). "Portugal". In Chumbley, Stephen (ed.). Conway's All the World's Fighting Ships 1947-1995. Annapolis, Maryland: Naval Institute Press. pp. 317–322. ISBN 1-55750-132-7.
- Roberts, John (1980). "Portugal". In Chesneau, Roger (ed.). Conway's All the World's Fighting Ships 1922–1946. New York: Mayflower Books. pp. 396–398. ISBN 0-8317-0303-2.
- Whitley, M. J. (1988). Destroyers of World War Two: An International Encyclopedia. Annapolis, Maryland: Naval Institute Press. ISBN 0-87021-326-1.
