= Tejo =

Tejo may refer to:

- Tagus (Portuguese: Tejo), a river on the Iberian Peninsula.
- Tejo (sport), a sport and national pastime of Colombia.
- Tejo (Argentina), a sport and national pastime of Argentina.
- Tutmonda Esperantista Junulara Organizo (World Esperanto Youth Organization).
- Tejo, Ethiopia, the administrative center of Yemalogi Welele.
- Yew, a species of coniferous trees
