= Douro-class destroyer =

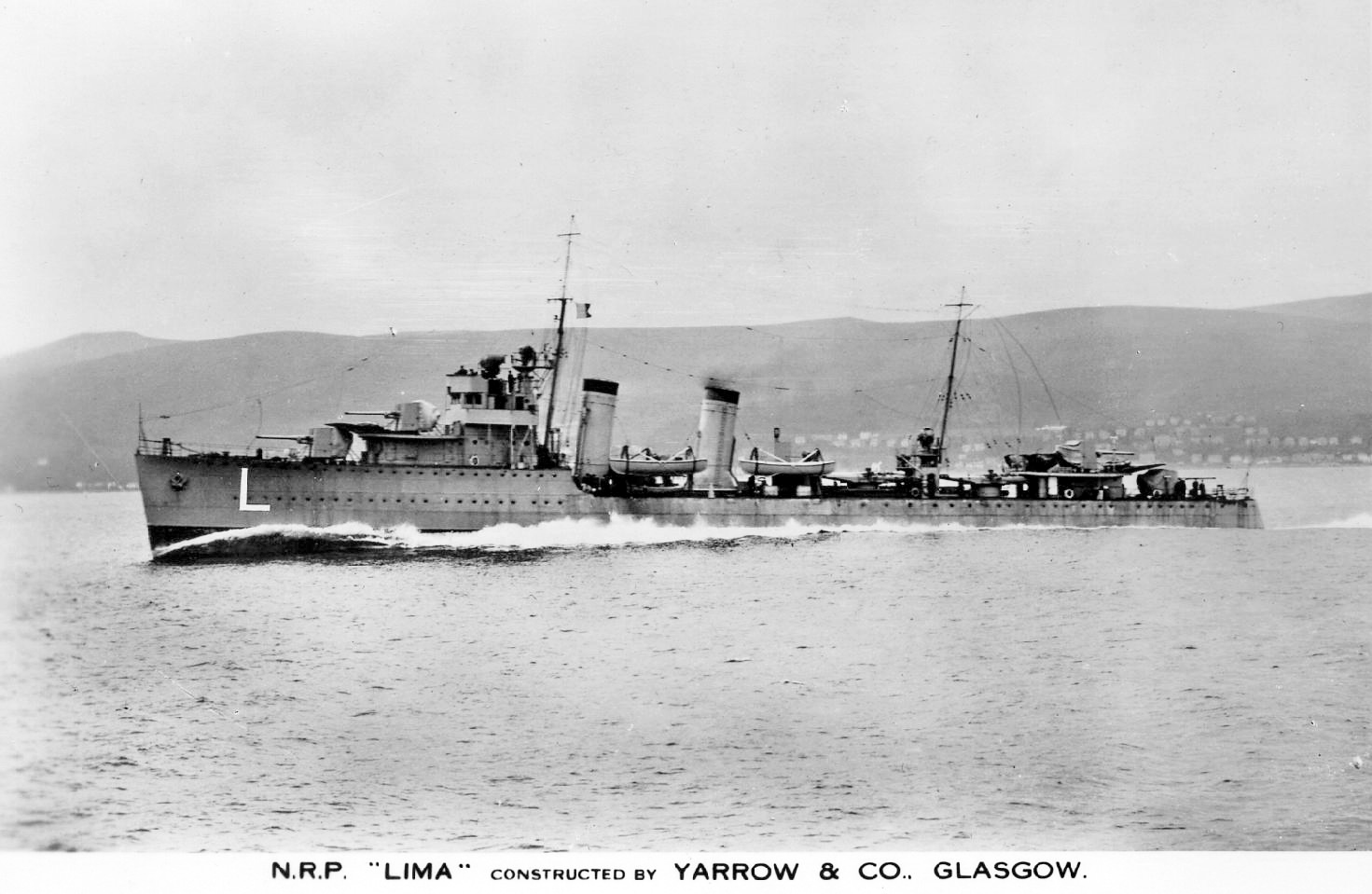
- Lima

Class overview
- Name: Douro-class destroyer
- Builders: Yarrow Shipbuilders; Lisbon Naval Arsenal
- Operators: Portuguese Navy; Colombian National Navy
- Preceded by: Guadiana class
- Subclasses: Antioquia class
- In commission: 1933–1967
- Completed: 5
- Retired: 5

General characteristics (as built)
- Type: Destroyer
- Displacement: 1,219 long tons (1,239 t) (standard); 1,563 long tons (1,588 t) (full load)
- Length: 323 ft (98.5 m)
- Beam: 31 ft (9.4 m)
- Draught: 11 ft (3.4 m)
- Installed power: 3 × Yarrow boilers; 33,000 shp (25,000 kW)
- Propulsion: 2 shafts; 2 × geared steam turbines
- Speed: 36 knots (67 km/h; 41 mph)
- Range: 5,400 nmi (10,000 km; 6,200 mi) at 15 knots (28 km/h; 17 mph)
- Complement: 147
- Armament: 4 × single 4.7 in (120 mm) guns; 3 × single 2 pdr (40 mm (1.6 in)) AA guns; 2 × quadruple 21 in (533 mm) torpedo tubes; 2 × depth charge throwers; 12 depth charges; 20 × mines

The Douro-class destroyers consisted of five ships used by the Portuguese Navy (Marinha Portuguesa) and two used by the Colombian Navy (Armada de la República de Colombia), all built during the 1930s. Note that in Portugal, this class of destroyers is usually referred to as the Vouga class, with the term Douro class being usually employed to designate the previous class of Portuguese destroyers also known as Guadiana class.

== Design and construction ==
In 1930, the Portuguese navy drew up a 10 year shipbuilding programme to replace its aging fleet, with planned purchases including two cruisers, twelve destroyers and a number of submarines and sloops. The competition for the design for destroyers was won by Yarrow Shipbuilders beating bids from Thornycroft and Italian shipyards. An order was placed for four ships on 12 June 1931, with two ships, Vouga and Lima to be built by Yarrows in the UK and the remaining ships, Tejo and Douro to be built at Lisbon with machinery to be supplied by Yarrow. A fifth ship, Dão, again to be built in Lisbon using Yarrow-supplied machinery, was ordered on 18 January 1933.

Yarrow's design was based on Ambuscade, a prototype destroyer built for the Royal Navy in 1926. The ships were 323 feet (98.45 m) long overall, with a beam of 31 feet (9.45 m) and a draught of 11 feet (3.35 m). The ship displaced 1,219 long tons (1,239 t) at standard load and 1,563 long tons (1,588 t) at full load.

They were powered by two Parsons-Curtis geared steam turbines, each driving one propeller shaft using steam provided by three Yarrow boilers that operated at a pressure of 400 psi (2,758 kPa; 28 kgf/cm^{2}). The turbines, rated at 33,000 shaft horsepower (25,000 kW), were intended to give a maximum speed of 36 knots (67 km/h; 41 mph). The destroyers carried a maximum of 345 long tons (351 t) of fuel oil that gave them a range of 5,400 nautical miles (10,000 km; 6,200 mi) at 15 knots (28 km/h; 17 mph). (Note: Vouga made an average speed of 36.17 knots (66.99 km/h; 41.62 mph) at 32,255 shaft horsepower (24,053 kW) during sea trials while Lima reached 36.36 knots (67.34 km/h; 41.84 mph) at 31,110 shaft horsepower (23,200 kW) during trials.)

Armament was similar to contemporary Royal Navy destroyers, with a gun armament of four 4.7 in (120 mm) Vickers-Armstrongs Mk G guns, and three 2-pounder (40 mm (1.6 in)) Mk VIII "pom-pom" anti-aircraft guns. Two quadruple banks of 21-inch (533 mm) torpedo tubes were carried, while two depth charge throwers and 12 depth charges constituted the ships' anti-submarine armament. Up to 20 mines could be carried. The ships complement was 147 officers and men.

The two Yarrow-built ships were laid down in October 1931, and commissioned in 1933, while the first two Lisbon-built ships, Douro and Tejo, laid down in 1932, were sold to the Colombian Navy before completion in response to the Leticia Incident between Columbia and Peru, and Peru's purchasing of two ex-Russian destroyers (Almirante Guise and Villar) from Estonia. Renamed Antioquia and Caldas, respectively, they served the Colombians as the Antioquia class. Two further ships were ordered by the Portuguese Navy to replace them.

== Service ==
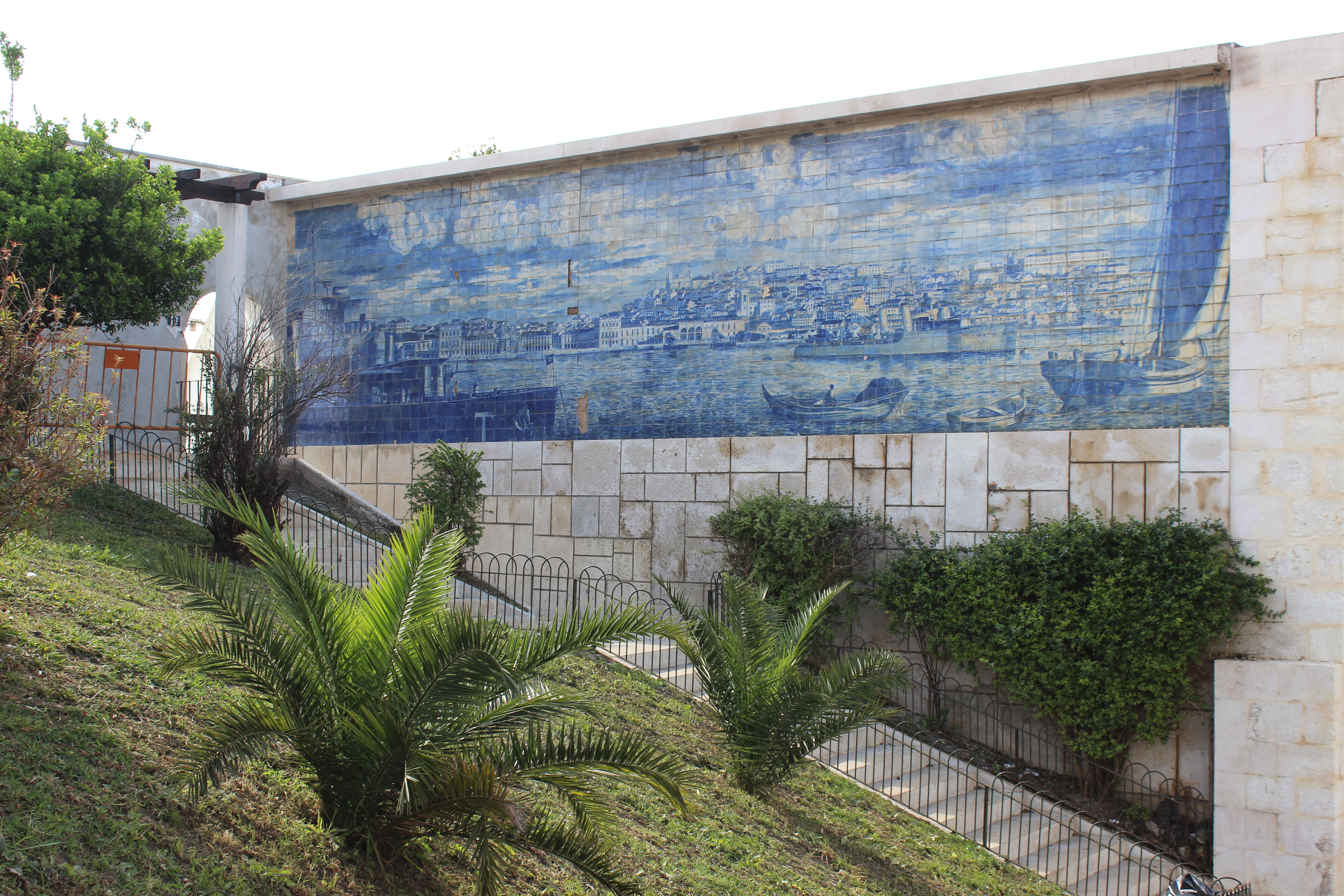
Azulejo panel in Lisbon showing three of the ships on the Tagus River, Tejo in the left foreground, Douro in the right center and Vouga in the right background, just above the sailboat

The five destroyers carried out patrols to defend Portugal's neutrality during the Second World War. Their anti-aircraft armament was revised during 1942–43, with the three pom-poms and one of the banks of torpedo tubes replaced by six 20 mm cannon. They were refitted by Yarrow from 1946–49, with the machinery refurbished, anti-aircraft armament again revised to three Bofors 40 mm gun in powered mounts and three 20 mm cannon, and sonar and radar (British Type 285 and Type 291) fitted. Douro reached a speed of 34.05 knots (63.06 km/h; 39.18 mph) at 28,085 shaft horsepower (20,943 kW) during post-refit trials.

Four of the five destroyers were refitted and modernised again in 1957, (Douro was not refitted, and was disposed of in 1959) with two 4.7 inch guns removed, allowing a Squid anti-submarine mortar to be fitted and the anti-aircraft armament to be increased to five 40 mm Bofors guns and three 20 mm cannon. The last of the class, Vouga, was discarded in 1967.

== Ships in class ==
Construction data
Name	Builder	Launched	Commissioned	Fate
Dão	Lisbon Shipyard	30 July 1934	5 January 1935	Stricken, 29 November 1960
Douro (i)	Lisbon Shipyard	18 November 1933		Sold to Colombia, 1934; Renamed Antioquia
Douro (ii)	Lisbon Shipyard	16 August 1935	11 February 1936	Stricken, December 1959
Lima	Yarrow Shipbuilders	29 May 1933	12 October 1933	Discarded, 16 October 1965
Tejo (i)	Lisbon Shipyard	10 May 1933		Sold to Colombia, 1934; Renamed Caldas
Tejo (ii)	Lisbon Shipyard	4 May 1935	12 October 1935	Stricken, 9 February 1965
Vouga	Yarrow Shipbuilders	25 January 1933	24 June 1933	Discarded, 3 June 1967

== Sources ==
- Blackman, Raymond V. B., ed. (1960). Jane's Fighting Ships 1960–61. London: Sampson Low, Marston & Co.
- Friedman, Norman (2009). British Destroyers: From Earliest Days to the Second World War. Barnsley, UK: Seaforth Publishing. ISBN 978-1-84832-049-9.
- Griffith, Frank G. (1988). "Cover Photo and Miscellaneous comments". Warship International. XXV (2): 116. ISSN 0043-0374.
- Lyon, Hugh & Chumbley, Stephen (1995). "Portugal". In Chumbley, Stephen (ed.). Conway's All the World's Fighting Ships 1947-1995. Annapolis, Maryland: Naval Institute Press. pp. 317–322. ISBN 1-55750-132-7.
- Roberts, John (1980). "Portugal". In Chesneau, Roger (ed.). Conway's All the World's Fighting Ships 1922–1946. New York: Mayflower Books. pp. 396–398. ISBN 0-8317-0303-2.
- Whitley, M. J. (1988). Destroyers of World War Two: An International Encyclopedia. Annapolis, Maryland: Naval Institute Press. ISBN 0-87021-326-1.
