= NRP Douro (D332) =

Douro-class destroyer of the Portuguese Navy, in service from 1935 to 1959

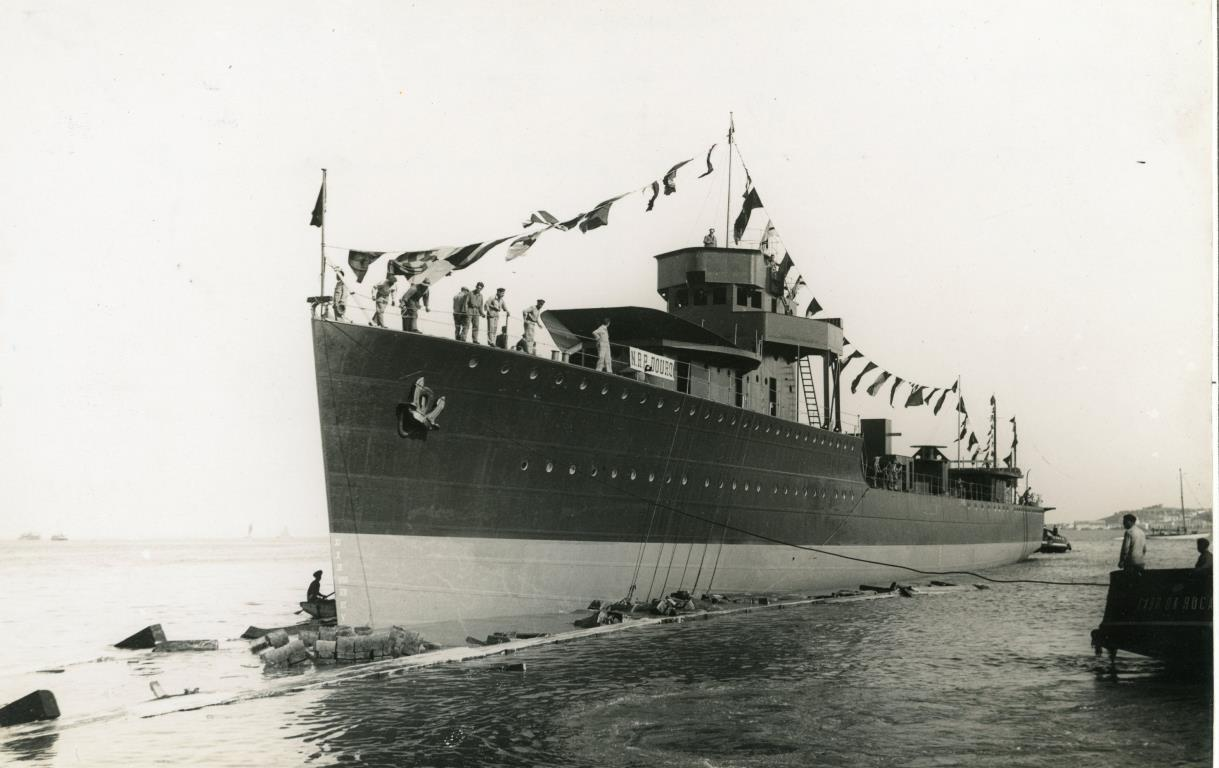

History

Portugal
- Name: Douro
- Namesake: Douro River
- Builder: Lisbon Dockyard
- Launched: 16 August 1935
- Commissioned: 11 February 1936
- Fate: Stricken, December 1959

General characteristics (as built)
- Type: Douro-class destroyer
- Displacement: 1,219 long tons (1,239 t) (standard); 1,563 long tons (1,588 t) (full load)
- Length: 323 ft (98.5 m)
- Beam: 31 ft (9.4 m)
- Draught: 11 ft (3.4 m)
- Installed power: 3 × Yarrow boilers; 33,000 shp (25,000 kW)
- Propulsion: 2 shafts; 2 × geared steam turbines
- Speed: 36 knots (67 km/h; 41 mph)
- Range: 5,400 nmi (10,000 km; 6,200 mi) at 15 knots (28 km/h; 17 mph)
- Complement: 147
- Armament: 4 × single 4.7 in (120 mm) guns; 3 × single 2 pdr (40 mm (1.6 in)) AA guns; 2 × quadruple 21 in (533 mm) torpedo tubes; 2 × depth charge throwers; 12 depth charges; 20 × mines

NRP Douro was one of five Douro-class destroyer built for the Portuguese Navy during the 1930s. She remained in service until 1959.

== Design and description ==
The Douro-class ships were designed by the British shipbuilder Yarrows and were based on Ambuscade, a prototype destroyer built for the Royal Navy in 1926 by Yarrow. They were 323 feet (98.45 m) long overall, with a beam of 31 feet (9.45 m) and a draught of 11 feet (3.35 m). The ships displaced 1,219 long tons (1,239 t) at standard load and 1,563 long tons (1,588 t) at full load.

The Douros were powered by two Parsons-Curtis geared steam turbines, each driving one propeller shaft using steam provided by three Yarrow boilers. The turbines, rated at 33,000 shaft horsepower (25,000 kW), were intended to give a maximum speed of 36 knots (67 km/h; 41 mph). The destroyers carried enough fuel oil to give them a range of 5,400 nautical miles (10,000 km; 6,200 mi) at 15 knots (28 km/h; 17 mph).

Armament was similar to contemporary Royal Navy destroyers, with a gun armament of four 4.7 in (120 mm) Vickers-Armstrongs Mk G guns, and three 2-pounder (40 mm (1.6 in)) Mk VIII anti-aircraft guns. Two quadruple banks of 21-inch (533 mm) torpedo tubes were carried, while two depth charge throwers and 12 depth charges constituted the ships' anti-submarine armament. Up to 20 mines could be carried. The ships' complement consisted of 147 officers and men.

== Construction and career ==
The five destroyers carried out patrols to defend Portugal's neutrality during the Second World War. Their anti-aircraft armament was revised during 1942–1943, with the 40 mm guns and one of the banks of torpedo tubes replaced by six 20 mm cannon. The ships were refitted by Yarrow from 1946 to 1949, with the machinery refurbished, anti-aircraft armament again revised to three Bofors 40 mm gun in powered mounts and three 20 mm cannon. Sonar and British Type 285 and Type 291 radars were fitted. Douro reached a speed of 34.05 knots (63.06 km/h; 39.18 mph) at 28,085 shp (20,943 kW) during her post-refit trials.

== Sources ==
- Blackman, Raymond V. B., ed. (1960). Jane's Fighting Ships 1960–61. London: Sampson Low, Marston & Co.
- Griffith, Frank G. (1988). "Cover Photo and Miscellaneous comments". Warship International. XXV (2): 116. ISSN 0043-0374.
- Lyon, Hugh & Chumbley, Stephen (1995). "Portugal". In Chumbley, Stephen (ed.). Conway's All the World's Fighting Ships 1947-1995. Annapolis, Maryland: Naval Institute Press. pp. 317–322. ISBN 1-55750-132-7.
- Roberts, John (1980). "Portugal". In Chesneau, Roger (ed.). Conway's All the World's Fighting Ships 1922–1946. New York: Mayflower Books. pp. 396–398. ISBN 0-8317-0303-2.
- Whitley, M. J. (1988). Destroyers of World War Two: An International Encyclopedia. Annapolis, Maryland: Naval Institute Press. ISBN 0-87021-326-1.
