= Antioquia =

Antioquia is the Spanish form of Antioch.

Antioquia may also refer to:

- Antioquia Department, Colombia
- Antioquia State, Colombia (defunct)
- Antioquia District, Peru
- Antioquia Railway, in Colombia
- Antioquia University in Medellin, Colombia
