= USS Kalamazoo (AOG-30) =

History

United States
- Name: USS Kalamazoo
- Namesake: Kalamazoo River in Michigan
- Ordered: as T1-M-A2 tanker hull
- Laid down: 7 July 1944
- Launched: 30 August 1944
- Acquired: 7 October 1944
- Commissioned: 14 October 1944
- Decommissioned: 18 May 1946
- Stricken: date unknown
- Fate: transferred, 26 November 1947, to Colombia

History

Colombia
- Name: ARC Blas de Lezo (BT-62)
- Acquired: 26 November 1947
- Stricken: January 1965

General characteristics
- Tonnage: 1,228 long tons deadweight (DWT)
- Displacement: 846 tons(lt) 2,270 tons(fl)
- Length: 220 ft 6 in
- Beam: 37 ft
- Draught: 17 ft
- Propulsion: Diesel direct drive, single screw, 720 hp
- Speed: 10 knots (19 km/h)
- Complement: 62
- Armament: one single 3 in (76 mm) dual purpose gun mount, two 40 mm guns, three single 20 mm gun mounts

USS Kalamazoo (AOG-30) was a T1-M-A2 Mettawee-class gasoline tanker acquired by the U.S. Navy for the dangerous task of transporting gasoline to warships in the fleet, and to remote Navy stations.

Kalamazoo was laid down 7 July 1944 by East Coast Shipyards, Inc., Bayonne, New Jersey, under a Maritime Commission contract; launched 30 August 1944; sponsored by Harriett Savage; acquired by the Navy 7 October; and commissioned 14 October at New York Navy Yard.

== World War II service ==
Following shakedown in the Caribbean, Kalamazoo cleared Norfolk, Virginia, 7 December for Aruba, Dutch West Indies, to load fuel oil.

=== Pacific Theatre operations ===
She departed Aruba 21 December for duty in the Southwest Pacific Ocean. After fueling operations in the Solomons, Admiralties, and Humboldt Bay, New Guinea, she arrived Leyte Gulf, Philippine Islands, 4 March 1945 as a unit of the Service Force, U.S. 7th Fleet. She operated as a gasoline tanker out of San Pedro Bay until 15 April when she sailed for fueling operations off the southern Philippines. Arriving Police Harbor, Mindanao, 20 April, she served for more than 7 months in the Celebes Sea, transporting cargo and fuel from Borneo and Morotai to ports in Mindanao.

== Post-war activity ==
Departing Zamboanga, Mindanao, 1 December, Kalamazoo steamed via Manila to Subic Bay, Luzon, where she remained until sailing for the United States 11 January 1946. She reached San Francisco, California, 12 March and cleared port on the 22d for passage to the U.S. Gulf Coast. On 1 April while en route to the Panama Canal Zone her main engine failed. Kennebago (AO-81) assisted her to Balboa where she arrived 10 April. Under tow from rescue tug ATR-85, she departed Cristobal, Panama Canal Zone, 26 April for Mobile, Alabama, where she arrived 3 May. Final disposition: fate unknown.

== Post-war decommissioning ==
Kalamazoo decommissioned 18 May and subsequently was turned over to the Maritime Commission for disposal. She transferred to Colombia 26 November 1947 and was renamed Blas de Lezo (BT-62). Final Disposition, fate unknown.

== Military awards and honors ==
Kalamazoo' crew was eligible for the following medals:

- American Campaign Medal
- Asiatic-Pacific Campaign Medal
- World War II Victory Medal
- Philippine Liberation Medal
