= ARC Caldas (1933) =

Douro-class destroyer of the Portuguese Navy, in service from 1935 to 1959

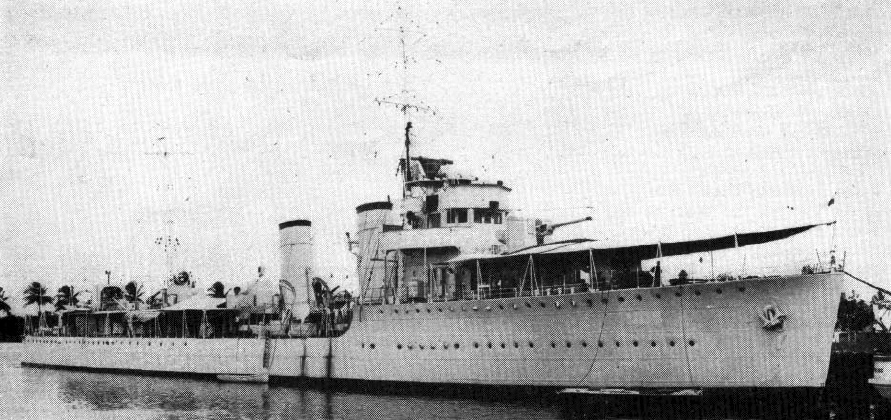
- Caldas in the 1940s

History

Colombia
- Name: Caldas
- Namesake: Caldas Department
- Builder: Lisbon Dockyard
- Launched: 10 November 1933
- Acquired: 1933
- Commissioned: 16 May 1934
- Decommissioned: 25 October 1960
- Refit: 1954
- Fate: Scrapped, 1961

General characteristics (as built)
- Class & type: Antioquia-class destroyer
- Displacement: 1,219 long tons (1,239 t) (standard); 1,563 long tons (1,588 t) (full load)
- Length: 323 ft (98.5 m)
- Beam: 31 ft (9.4 m)
- Draught: 11 ft (3.4 m)
- Installed power: 3 × Yarrow boilers; 33,000 shp (25,000 kW)
- Propulsion: 2 shafts; 2 × geared steam turbines
- Speed: 36 knots (67 km/h; 41 mph)
- Range: 5,400 nmi (10,000 km; 6,200 mi) at 15 knots (28 km/h; 17 mph)
- Complement: 147
- Armament: 4 × single 4.7 in (120 mm) guns; 3 × single 2 pdr (40 mm (1.6 in)) AA guns; 2 × quadruple 21 in (533 mm) torpedo tubes; 2 × depth charge throwers; 12 depth charges; 20 × mines

ARC Caldas was one of two Antioquia-class destroyers built for the Colombian Navy during the 1930s. Originally ordered for the Portuguese Navy, the two ships were purchased by Colombia while still under construction. She was discarded in 1960 and subsequently scrapped.

== Design and description ==
The Antioquia-class ships were designed by the British shipbuilder Yarrow and were based on Ambuscade, a prototype destroyer built for the Royal Navy in 1926 by Yarrow. They were 323 feet (98.45 m) long overall and 307 feet (93.57 m) between perpendiculars, with a beam of 31 feet (9.45 m) and a draught of 11 feet (3.35 m). The ship displaced 1,219 long tons (1,239 t) at standard load and 1,563 long tons (1,588 t) at full load.

The Antioquias were powered by two Parsons-Curtis geared steam turbines, each driving one propeller shaft using steam provided by three Yarrow boilers. The turbines, rated at 33,000 shaft horsepower (25,000 kW), were intended to give a maximum speed of 36 knots (67 km/h; 41 mph). The destroyers carried enough fuel oil to give them a range of 5,400 nautical miles (10,000 km; 6,200 mi) at 15 knots (28 km/h; 17 mph).

Armament was similar to contemporary Royal Navy destroyers, with a gun armament of four 4.7 in (120 mm) Vickers-Armstrongs Mk G guns, and three 2-pounder (40 mm (1.6 in)) Mk VIII anti-aircraft guns. Two quadruple banks of 21-inch (533mm) torpedo tubes were carried, while two depth charge throwers and 12 depth charges constituted the ships' anti-submarine armament. Up to 20 mines could be carried. The ships' complement consisted of 147 officers and men.

== 1955 incident ==
On 28 February 1955, eight crew members of the Caldas went overboard due to an alleged storm on a voyage to Cartagena. One of the sailors, Luis Alejandro Velasco, managed to survive on a life raft for ten days without food or water and was found by locals on a beach near San Juan de Uraba. The other sailors had drowned shortly after they went overboard, making him the sole survivor of the incident. Velasco was subsequently treated as a national hero by the government of Gustavo Rojas Pinilla.

Velasco later revealed to author Gabriel García Márquez that there had been no storm and that the Caldas was instead overloaded with contraband in Mobile where it had laid for repairs, causing the ship to list dangerously. Márquez initially published these findings in a series of articles for the El Espectador newspaper in 1955 and later again in his book The Story of a Shipwrecked Sailor in 1970. The publication of the 1955 articles caused great controversy since they contradicted the official narrative about the incident adopted by the Colombian government.

== Sources ==
- Griffith, Frank G. (1988). "Cover Photo and Miscellaneous comments". Warship International. XXV (2): 116. ISSN 0043-0374.
- Márquez, Gabriel García (1970). The Story of a Shipwrecked Sailor. ISBN 978-0-241-96860-4
- Roberts, John (1980). "Portugal". In Chesneau, Roger (ed.). Conway's All the World's Fighting Ships 1922–1946. New York: Mayflower Books. pp. 396–398. ISBN 0-8317-0303-2.
- Whitley, M. J. (1988). Destroyers of World War Two: An International Encyclopedia. Annapolis, Maryland: Naval Institute Press. ISBN 0-87021-326-1.
