= Antioquia-class destroyer =

1933 class of Colombian destroyers

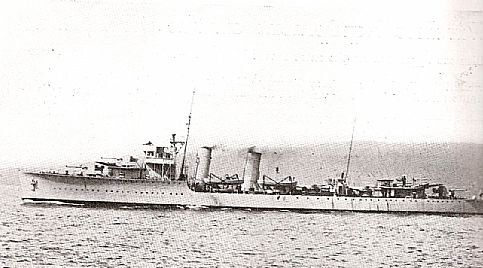
- Portuguese NRP Vouga, sister ship of Antioquia class

Class overview
- Name: Antioquia class
- Builders: Lisbon Naval Arsenal, Lisbon
- Operators: Colombian National Navy
- Succeeded by: Fletcher class
- Built: 1932–1934
- In commission: 1934–1961
- Completed: 2
- Scrapped: 2

General characteristics
- Type: Destroyer
- Displacement: 1,219 long tons (1,239 t) standard; 1,563 long tons (1,588 t) (full load)
- Length: 323 ft 0 in (98.5 m)
- Beam: 31 ft 0 in (9.4 m)
- Draught: 8 ft 11 in (2.7 m)
- Installed power: 33,000 shp (24,608 kW)
- Propulsion: 3 × Yarrow boilers; 2 × Parsons turbines with Curtiss reduction gearing; 2 shafts with non-controllable-pitch propellers (CPP)
- Speed: 36 knots (67 km/h; 41 mph)
- Range: 5,400 nmi (10,000 km; 6,200 mi) at 15 kn (28 km/h; 17 mph)
- Endurance: 9 days, 292 long tons (297 t)
- Complement: 147
- Armament: 4 × BL 4.7 in (119 mm) guns; 2 × Vickers Mk.VIII 2-pounder anti-aircraft guns; 2 × quad 21 in (533 mm) torpedo tubes for Mk.IX torpedoes; 20 naval mines

The Antioquia class of destroyers consisted of two ships, ARC Antioquia and ARC Caldas, used by the navy of Colombia, the Armada Nacional República de Colombia, between 1934 and 1961. Initially constructed at the Lisbon Naval Arsenal as part of the Portuguese Navy's Douro class, they were acquired by Colombia before completion in response to the Peruvian purchase of two destroyers during the war with Peru. They arrived too late to see service in the conflict and saw little action during their service lives. They underwent a major refit in the mid-1950s which saw their armament completely redone. Following their removal from service in 1961, they were broken up for scrap.

== Design and description ==
The Antioquia class was initially a version of the Portuguese Navy's Douro class. The design was by the British company Yarrow Shipbuilders, based on that of the Royal Navy's prototype destroyer HMS Ambuscade. The Antioquia-class destroyers were acquired by Colombia before completion but were built to standard Douro-class specifics. The Douro class closely resembled many British designs in the interwar period. The destroyers were 323 feet 0 inches (98.5 m) long overall and 307 feet 0 inches (93.6 m) between perpendiculars with a beam of 31 feet 0 inches (9.4 m) and a mean draught of 8 feet 11 inches (2.7 m). The ship had a standard displacement of 1,219 long tons (1,239 t) and was 1,563 long tons (1,588 t) fully loaded.

The vessels were powered by three oil-fired Yarrow boilers providing 400 psi (2,758 kPa) of steam to two Parsons turbines with Curtiss reduction gearing. These turned two shafts and was rated at 33,000 shaft horsepower (24,608 kW) with a maximum speed of 36 knots (67 km/h; 41 mph). The destroyers had capacity for 292 long tons (297 t) of fuel oil and a range of 5,400 nautical miles (10,000 km; 6,200 mi) at 15 knots (28 km/h; 17 mph).

The Antioquia class was armed with four BL 4.7-inch (119 mm) guns with two mounted forward in single turrets with gun shields and two mounted aft in a similar fashion. 140 rounds were carried for each gun. The destroyers were equipped with three single-mounted 40-millimetre (1.6 in) "pom-poms" with two on the aft shelter deck and one between the funnels. They were also armed with two quadruple banks of 21-inch (533 mm) torpedo tubes mounted centrally, two depth charge throwers with twelve depth charges and were fitted for minelaying with 20 naval mines carried.

== Ships in class ==
Antioquia-class destroyers
Name	Builder	Launched	Commissioned	Fate	Notes
Antioquia	Lisbon Naval Arsenal, Lisbon	9 June 1932 (Note: Whitley has the launch date as 10 May 1933.)	24 February 1934	Broken up at Barranquilla, November 1961	Initially Portuguese Douro
Caldas	Lisbon Naval Arsenal, Lisbon	18 November 1933	16 May 1934	Broken up at Cartagena, 1961	Initially Portuguese Tejo

== Construction and service history ==
Originally ordered by the Portuguese government in 1930 as part of a new building programme. In conjunction with Yarrows, the Lisbon Naval Arsenal of Lisbon was chosen to construct two hulls while Yarrows would provide and install the destroyer's machinery. Named Douro and Tejo, the two hulls constructed in Lisbon were sold to Colombia before completion in response to the Colombia–Peru War, in response to the Peruvian acquisition of two destroyers. Portugal order two further ships to replace them. Douro was renamed Antioquia and Tejo was renamed Caldas.

The war with Peru was short-lived and the Antioquias did not enter service before the war ended. Both ships were launched in 1933 and were commissioned in 1934. The two destroyers saw little action as Colombia remained neutral during World War II. However, the Colombian Navy did perform neutrality patrols into the Caribbean Sea after the German submarine U-154 began attacking shipping off its shores. Caldas patrolled the Caribbean Sea on 29–30 March 1944 searching for the submarine. In the 1940s, two 20 mm (0.79 in) cannon were added amidships.

Following the war, the destroyers returned to their tranquil service until 1952 when Antioquia began a major refit, beginning at Cartagena before going to the United States in 1953. Caldas underwent the same refit in 1954–1955. Both ships were refitted in the United States when two 5-inch (127 mm)/38 calibre guns replaced the four 4.7-inch guns, one forward and one aft. The destroyers were fitted with Mk 52 fire control, three more 40 mm guns and a hedgehog anti-submarine mortar. The number of torpedo tubes was reduced to one quadruple mount. Antioquia was decommissioned on 23 January 1961, and Caldas on 3 March 1961, with both ships being scrapped.

== Sources ==
- Blackman, Raymond V. B., ed. (1953). Jane's Fighting Ships 1953–54. London: Sampson, Low and Marston. OCLC 913556389.
- Chesneau, Roger, ed. (1980). Conway's All the World's Fighting Ships 1922–1946. Greenwich, UK: Conway Maritime Press. ISBN 0-85177-146-7.
- Whitley, M. J. (2000) [1988]. Destroyers of World War Two: An International Encyclopedia. Annapolis, Maryland: Naval Institute Press. ISBN 0-87021-326-1.
