= HMS Ambuscade (D38) =

Destroyer of the Royal Navy

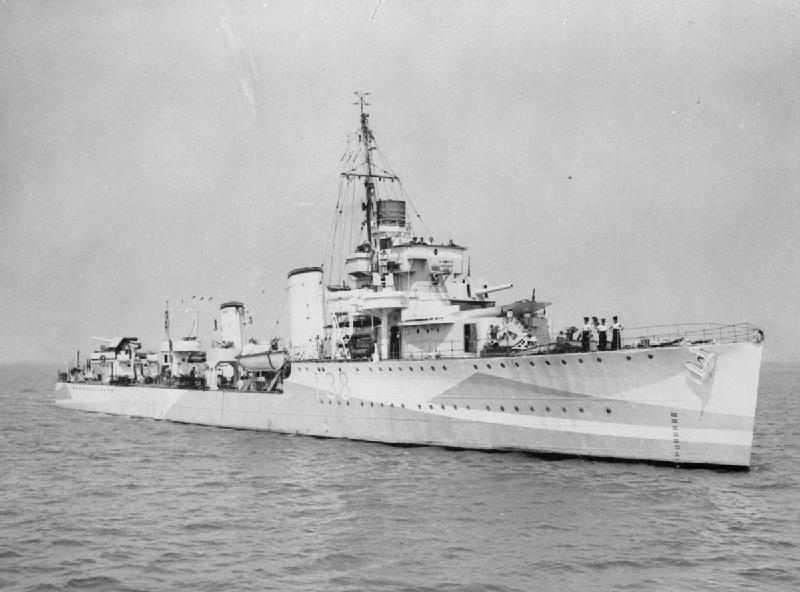
- HMS Ambuscade

Class overview
- Preceded by: Admiralty Modified W class
- Succeeded by: A- and B class

History

United Kingdom
- Name: HMS Ambuscade
- Ordered: 12 June 1924
- Builder: Yarrow
- Laid down: 8 December 1924
- Launched: 15 January 1926
- Commissioned: 9 April 1927
- Identification: Pennant number: D38
- Fate: Broken up in 1947

General characteristics
- Type: Destroyer
- Displacement: 1,173 long tons (1,192 t) (standard); 1,585 long tons (1,610 t)
- Length: 322 ft (98.15 m) oa; 307 ft (93.57 m) pp
- Beam: 31 ft (9.45 m)
- Draught: 8 ft 6 in (2.59 m)
- Propulsion: 3 × Yarrow boilers; Geared turbines, 2 shafts, 35,500 shp (26,500 kW)
- Speed: 37 kn (69 km/h; 43 mph)
- Range: 3,310 nmi (6,130 km; 3,810 mi) at 15 kn (28 km/h; 17 mph)
- Complement: 138
- Armament: 4 × BL 4.7-inch (120 mm) guns; 2 × 2-pounder anti-aircraft guns; 6 × 21 inch (533 mm) torpedo tubes (2 × 3)

HMS Ambuscade was a British Royal Navy destroyer which served in the Second World War. She and her Thornycroft competitor, HMS Amazon, were prototypes designed to exploit advances in construction and machinery since World War I and formed the basis of Royal Navy destroyer evolution up to the Tribal of 1936.

She was launched at Yarrow on 15 January 1926, served in World War II, and was broken up at Troon in 1946.

== Design and construction ==
In November 1923, the Admiralty issued a request to the major British shipyards specialising in destroyers for designs for the first destroyers to be built for the Royal Navy since the end of the First World War. The ships were required to carry a similar armament to that of the preceding war-built W-class destroyers (i.e. four 4.7 in (120 mm) guns and six 21 in (533 mm) torpedo tubes) but to have a longer range, at least 5,000 nautical miles (9,300 km; 5,800 mi) at cruising speed. A speed of at least 34 knots (63 km/h; 39 mph) was required, and the ships were to be no more than 315 feet (96.01 m) long between perpendiculars (pp).

The winning designs were those from Yarrow and Thornycroft, and orders for one ship each placed in June 1924. Yarrow's design, which became HMS Ambuscade, was smaller and lighter (307 feet (93.57 m) long (pp) and 1,585 long tons (1,610 t) full load displacement) than Thornycroft's Amazon (311 feet 9 inches (95.02 m) pp long and 1,812 long tons (1,841 t) full load). The ship was fitted with Yarrow's distinctive inward sloping stern, which Yarrow claimed increased the ship's speed by up to 1 knot (1.9 km/h; 1.2 mph) compared to a conventional V-shaped stern.

In order to provide the increased fuel economy required by the specification, Ambuscade was fitted three 4-drum Yarrow boilers with air pre-heating, working at a pressure of 290 pounds per square inch (2,000 kPa) and 200 °F (111 °C) of superheat. These fed geared steam turbines and drove two propeller shafts. The machinery was rated at 35,500 shaft horsepower (26,500 kW).

The main gun armament of Ambuscade consisted of four 4.7 inch BL Mk I guns. These guns fired a 50 pounds (23 kg) shell to a range of 15,800 yards (14,400 m) at a rate of about 5–6 rounds per gun per minute, with 190 shells carried per gun. (Later destroyers were fitted with QF guns firing cased charges and giving a higher rate of fire). Anti-aircraft armament consisted of two 2-pounder pom-poms (with 100 rounds per gun) and four Lewis guns. Torpedo armament consisted of the required six 21 inch torpedo tubes, in two triple mounts.

The ship's armament went through a number of changes during the Second World War. By April 1941, the aft triple torpedo-tube mount was replaced by a 3-inch (76 mm) anti-aircraft gun. Further changes included the addition of two Oerlikon 20 mm cannon, the removal of two 4.7 inch guns ("A"- and "Y"-mount), replacement of the ships rangefinder and director with radar, fitting of the Hedgehog anti-submarine mortar and a heavier depth charge outfit. The ship's Hedgehog mount and remaining torpedo tubes were removed when the ship was fitted with two Squid launchers in May 1943.

Ambuscade was laid down at Yarrow's Glasgow shipyard on 8 December 1924 and was launched on 14 January 1926. During speed trials on 2 March 1927, Ambuscade reached an average speed of 36.88 knots (68.30 km/h; 42.44 mph). She was commissioned on 9 April 1927. Ambuscade was the seventh ship of that name to serve with the Royal Navy.

== Service ==
Following commissioning, Ambuscade (with the pennant number D38) joined the Atlantic Fleet for trials, undergoing repair and modifications at Chatham Dockyard between September and November that year, before returning to normal duties. Between April and August 1928, Ambuscade and Amazon were sent on a cruise to South America and the West Indies to evaluate the ships and their machinery in tropical conditions. Both ships encountered problems with high temperatures in their engine rooms, while Ambuscade also suffered from vibration and had a shorter range than specified. In general, Amazon's machinery was considered more successful than that of Ambuscade. Following her return to the UK, Ambuscade joined the Third Destroyer Flotilla of the Mediterranean Fleet. In August 1929, she was hit by a practice torpedo, damaging her propellers and starboard propeller shaft, requiring repair at Malta until October that year. In January 1930, Ambuscade transferred to the Fourth Destroyer Flotilla, also part of the Mediterranean Fleet. In August, Ambuscade went to Malta for repair again, this time due to problems with the ship's turbines. The repairs continued until March 1931, when Ambuscade returned to the UK and went into reserve at Sheerness.

In June 1932, Ambuscade was taken out of reserve and joined the Home Fleet, serving in Irish waters. In December 1932, Ambuscade was deployed as a Tender to HMS Vernon, the torpedo school, being used for training and trials. Ambuscade continued this duty until February 1937, when the poor condition of the ship's turbines resulted in a refit at Portsmouth, with the turbines requiring replacement.

Ambuscade's refit continued until May 1940, (Note: Ambuscade spent much of the refit period laid up, with no work being carried out. One option considered during September 1939 was to modify the ship as a leader for Motor Torpedo Boats, which would have involved completely rearming the ship.) while when she re-entered service with the Sixteenth Destroyer Flotilla based at Harwich, receiving a new pennant number, I38. On 10 June, Ambuscade took part in the attempt to evacuate troops of the 51st (Highland) Division from Saint-Valery-en-Caux (Operation Cycle). Ambuscade was damaged by German shell fire while embarking troops, and on the journey back to Portsmouth, she took the destroyer HMS Boadicea in tow after the latter was badly damaged by German dive bombers. Following repair, Ambuscade rejoined her Flotilla, carrying out anti-invasion patrols and convoy escort operations in July and August 1940 On 18 July, Ambuscade went to the assistance of Naval trawler Turquoise, which had been bombed and machine-gunned by German aircraft while escorting a convoy near Kentish Knock. In September 1940 Ambuscade transferred to the Twelfth Destroyer Flotilla based at Greenock, but recurrence of the ship's turbine problems resulted in more repairs from September to November 1940.

Ambuscade then rejoined her Flotilla, by then based at Iceland for convoy escort duties. Further mechanical problems, this time with the ship's condensers forced more repair at Portsmouth between October 1941 and January 1942. In March 1942, Ambuscade formed part of the Arctic convoy PQ 14 on its leg from Scotland to Iceland, and for the return convoy QP 9. By this time, it was clear that Ambuscade's re-occurring mechanical problems meant that the ship was not fit for convoy escort duties, and Ambuscade was assigned target duties.

In late 1942, Ambuscade became a trials ship for anti-submarine weapons and sensors, being fitted with the experimental 'Parsnip' anti-submarine mortar in an attempt to provide a more capable ahead-firing anti-submarine weapon than 'Hedgehog'. 'Parsnip' was not a success, and in May 1943, Ambuscade was fitted with the prototype installation of the 'Squid' anti-submarine mortar and its associated depth-finding Type 147 sonar. Trials of Squid were successful, and the weapon was widely fitted in new construction Royal Navy escorts. Ambuscade continued in use as a trials and training platform until the end of the war in Europe, then going into reserve.

Ambuscade was used for shock trials during 1946, and was sold for scrapping in November that year, being broken up by West of Scotland Shipbreaking Company at Troon from March 1947.

== Export variants ==
Ambuscade served as the basis for the design by Yarrow of the Douro-class destroyers which served the Portuguese Navy (Marinha Portuguesa) from 1933 to 1967. Five vessels were ordered by Portugal in 1932. The first two, NRP Douro and Tejo, which were laid down on 9 June 1932, were sold to the Colombian Navy before their 1933 completion. This was in response to the Colombia–Peru War. Renamed ARC Antioquia and Caldas respectively, they served the Colombians as the Antioquia class.

The design also impressed Dutch officials, who were looking for foreign designs as the Royal Netherlands Navy aimed to modernize during the 1920s. Based on the design of Ambuscade, the eight resulting Admiralen-class destroyers were designed for service in the Dutch East Indies against Japan. Compared to the British design, the Dutch version was slightly slower and had a reduced range in exchange for a more powerful anti-aircraft armament, the inclusion of a reconnaissance seaplane, and the fitting of either minesweeping or minelaying equipment across eight ships.
