= Navio da República Portuguesa =

Ship prefix used to identify a commissioned ship of the Portuguese Navy

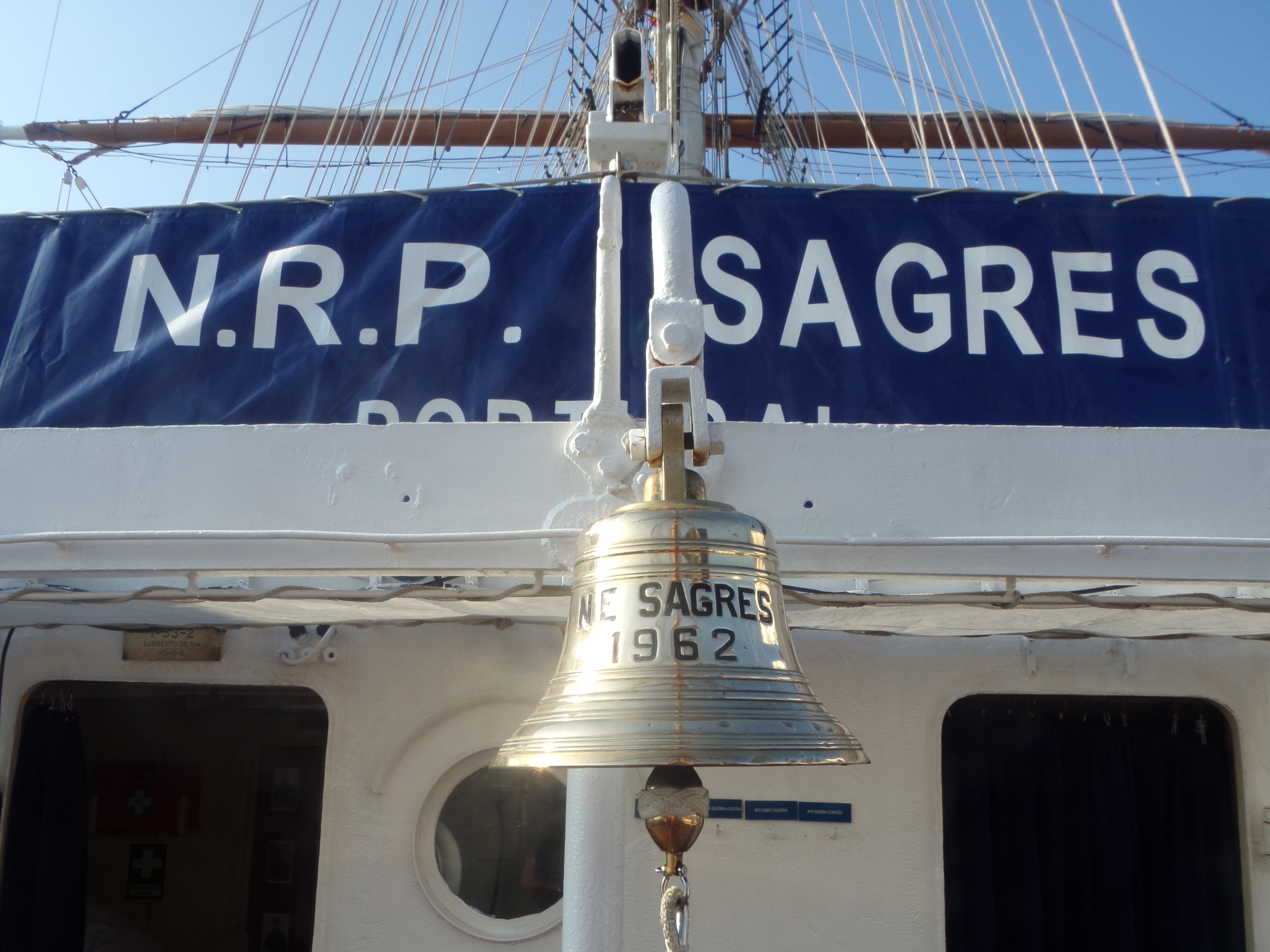
Banner on the Portuguese school ship Sagres with NRP prefix

Navio da República Portuguesa or the (Portuguese for "Ship of the Portuguese Republic"), abbreviated as N.R.P. or NRP, is a ship prefix used to identify a commissioned ship of the Portuguese Navy.

During the Portuguese Monarchy era, there was no standard method for referring to the Royal Portuguese Navy's ships. After the establishment of the Portuguese Republic on 5 October 1910, all Portuguese naval ships started to be officially referred to by their name preceded by Navio da República Portuguesa or its abbreviation.

After July 1981, Portuguese Navy's vessels not considered as naval ships came to be officially referred to by the prefix Unidade Auxiliar da Marinha (Navy's Auxiliary Unit), abbreviated as U.A.M. or UAM.

Sometimes, some Portuguese Navy vessels are referred to by alternative prefixes that indicate their function or type, as N.E. for Navio-Escola (school ship) or N.H. for Navio Hidrográfico (hydrographic ship). For example, although the official name of the school ship Sagres is N.R.P. Sagres, she is occasionally referred to as N.E. Sagres.
