= USS Hale (DD-642) =

Fletcher-class destroyer

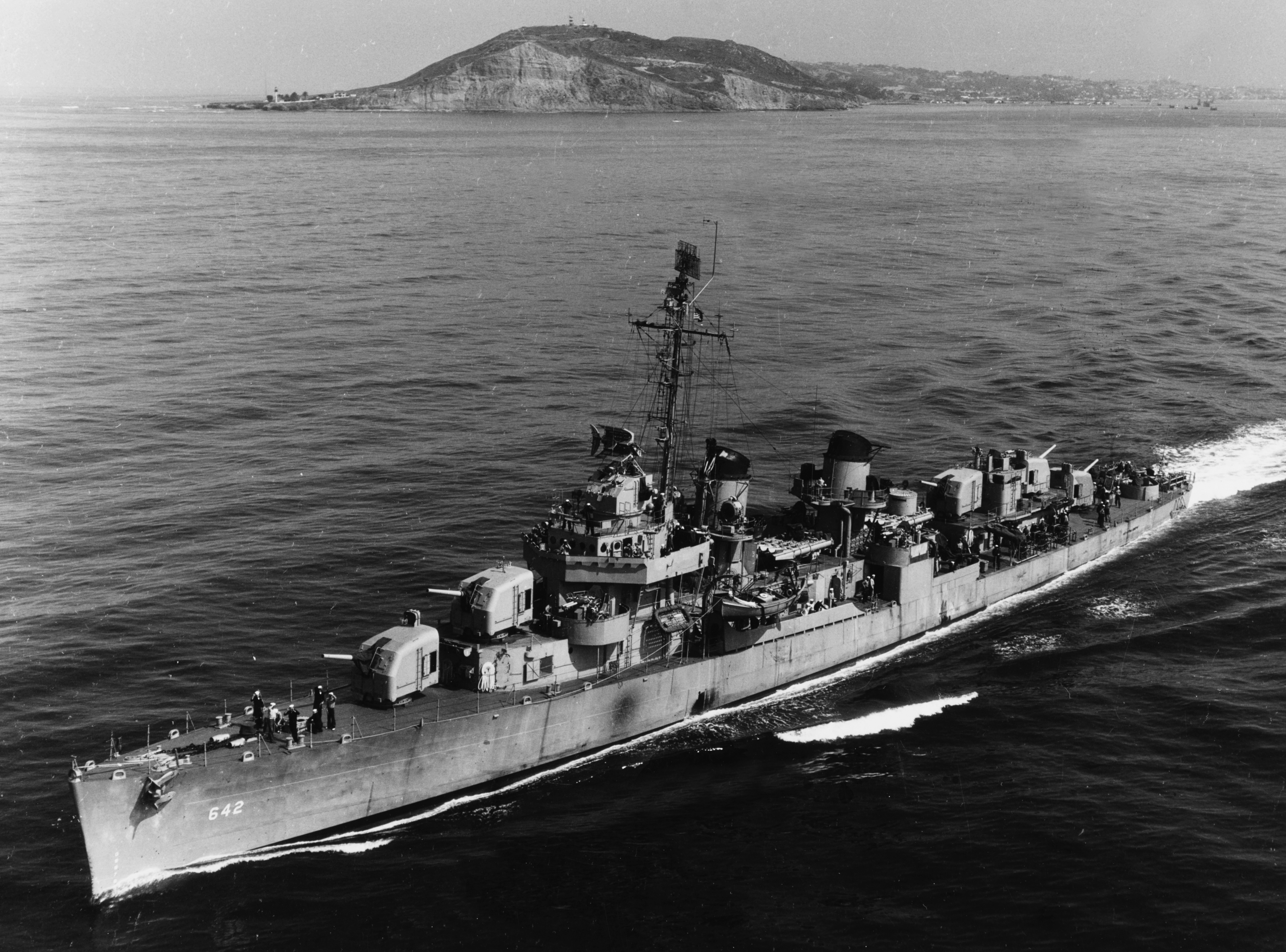

History

United States
- Namesake: Eugene Hale
- Builder: Bath Iron Works
- Laid down: 23 November 1942
- Launched: 4 April 1943
- Commissioned: 15 June 1943
- Decommissioned: 30 July 1960
- Stricken: 2 June 1975
- Fate: Transferred to Colombia 23 January 1961

History

Colombia
- Name: Antioquia
- Acquired: 23 January 1961
- Stricken: 20 December 1973
- Fate: Scrapped

General characteristics
- Class & type: Fletcher-class destroyer
- Displacement: 2,050 tons
- Length: 376 ft 6 in (114.7 m)
- Beam: 39 ft 8 in (12.1 m)
- Draft: 17 ft 9 in (5.4 m); 13.8 ft (4.2 m)
- Propulsion: 60,000 shp (45 MW); 2 propellers
- Speed: 35 knots (65 km/h; 40 mph)
- Range: 6500 nmi. (12,000 km); at 15 kt
- Complement: 329
- Armament: 5 × 5 in (130 mm), 4 × 40 mm AA guns, 4 × 20 mm AA guns, 10 × 21 inch (533 mm) torpedo tubes, 6 × depth charge projectors, 2 × depth charge tracks

USS Hale (DD-642), a Fletcher-class destroyer, was the second ship of the United States Navy to be named for Maine Senator Eugene Hale (1836–1918).

== Operational history ==
=== 1943 ===
Hale was launched 4 April 1943 by Bath Iron Works, Bath, Maine; sponsored by Mrs. G. H. Chase, granddaughter of Senator Hale; and commissioned at Boston 15 June 1943.

Hale conducted shakedown training in the Caribbean and training exercises on the East Coast before departing Halifax for the Pacific combat zone 21 September. She arrived Pearl Harbor via the Panama Canal 9 October 1943.

Hale departed 8 November 1943 for the invasion of the Gilbert Islands, the first step in America's amphibious sweep across Micronesia. She screened aircraft carriers in strikes on Tarawa 18–20 November, took part in the bombardment of Betio Island 19 November, and supported the landings by Marines next day. During the air attacks that followed, Hale's gunners accounted for several aircraft. After covering the retirement of damaged carrier Independence (CVL-22) for 2 days she rejoined the carrier striking force for attacks against the Marshall Islands, next target of the Pacific amphibious forces.

=== 1944 ===
Hale to Pearl Harbor 8 December to train the next assault and sailed 21 December for the Ellice Islands. She departed 21 January 1944 for the invasion of the Marshalls, pounding Maloelap and Wotje atolls 29 January to 22 February, before and after the landings. Executive officer LT CDR D.W. Wilson assumed command 2 March. Underway from Kwajalein 11 March, she sailed to Guadalcanal to perform anti-submarine patrol during the loading operations, and departed 27 March escorting reinforcements to Cape Torokina, Bougainville.

After acting as antisubmarine screen and screening ship for escort carriers supporting the Hollandia landings in New Guinea, Hale returned to Seeadler Harbor 4–7 May. She then steamed to the Solomons for the final rehearsals for the Marianas campaign. The ship then took part in pre-invasion strikes on Guam, returned briefly to Eniwetok 14 July, to support the Guam landings 21 July.

Hale returned to Eniwetok 4 August 1944, and departed 6 days later for assault and support operations in Hawaiian waters preparatory to the Leyte landings. She got underway with troop transports bound for Manus on 15 September, and departed 14 October with the Southern Attack Force bound for the Philippines. On 18 October her group was joined by Nashville (CL-43), with General Douglas MacArthur embarked. Hale entered Leyte Gulf early 20 October and helped troop units take Dulag airfield by providing accurate fire support. She then joined Rear Admiral Clifton A. F. Sprague's escort carriers 25 October after their valiant fight in the battle off Samar.

The destroyer next joined escort screening units for troop reinforcements at Morotai and landed them at Tacloban, Leyte, 14 November. After another such voyage from Hollandia to Leyte in November, aiding the buildup in the Philippines, Hale sailed 24 November via New Guinea, the Marshalls, and Pearl Harbor arriving San Francisco 22 December 1944.

=== 1945 ===
Hale returned to the Pacific War in early 1945, arriving Pearl Harbor 25 February. Sailing to Ulithi, she departed 14 March with Rear Admiral Forrest Sherman's Essex (CV-9) carrier task force to attack enemy air installations prior to the landings on Okinawa. The group suffered casualties, including Franklin (CV-13) and Wasp (CV-18) from air attack 19–21 March as Hale's gunners shot down several of the attackers. Departing the seas off Japan proper, the carrier force screened by Hale and other destroyers turned to Okinawa, flying close support and bombardment missions before, during, and after the initial assault 1 April. During the harrowing period off Okinawa Hale rescued two fighter pilots, drove off innumerable kamikaze attacks and survived a near miss during a bombing attack. The veteran destroyer departed Okinawa 11 April and after stops at Ulithi and Guam arrived Leyte Gulf in the screen of South Dakota (BB-57) 1 June 1945. She then escorted Washington (BB-56) to Guam and met tug Munsee (AT-107), towing the bow section of cruiser Pittsburgh (CA-72), torn off in the great typhoon off Okinawa, and brought her to Apra Harbor. The ship then sailed to join the 3d Fleet at Leyte Gulf 21 June.

Hale departed as a unit of Admiral Marc Mitscher's famed Task Force 38, 1 July 1945, bound for crippling strike against Japan itself. Hale took part in shore bombardment of factories at Hamamatsu 29 July.

As the war against Japan ended 15 August, Hale tool up duties as air-sea rescue ship offshore during the landing of occupation forces. She entered Tokyo Bay 16 September 1945, and departed 1 October for the United States carrying 100 veterans. She arrived Seattle 19 October 1945 and was placed in commission in reserve at San Diego until decommissioning 15 January 1947.

=== 1951 – 1960 ===
With the outbreak of the Korean War and the increase of tension throughout the world, Hale was taken out of reserve, commissioning at Long Beach 24 March 1951. After a shakedown cruise she sailed via the Panama Canal to her new home port, Newport, R.I., arriving 11 July 1951. After refresher training she departed 22 April 1952 to serve with the 6th Fleet in Mediterranean waters in support of American diplomacy in this vital and troubled region. After stopping at 16 ports in the course of her operations, Hale returned to Newport 23 October 1952. For the next 1½ years the destroyer performed a variety of tasks: antisubmarine training and development exercises off the Atlantic coast, plane guard duty or carrier operations in the Gulf of Mexico, and a training cruise for midshipmen of the Naval Academy.

After a modernization overhaul at Philadelphia Navy Yard, September 1953 to January 1954, Hale departed 1 June 1954 for a world cruise. Transiting the Panama Canal and entering the Pacific she proceeded to the Far East. She formed a part of America's ever-present naval strength lending stability to the area. Transiting the Suez Canal 17 November 1954, she visited many ports in 6th Fleet waters before returning to Newport 18 December 1954.

Hale continued her vital pattern of readiness exercises including serving as the Destroyer Force Gunnery School Ship at Newport, until 6 November 1956. Getting underway for the Mediterranean once more, she rendezvoused with 6th Fleet ships and stood by in the eastern Mediterranean during the Suez Crisis, helping to avert a larger conflict and protecting American interests. She returned to Newport 20 February 1957.

In June Hale participated in one of the greatest international naval reviews in history, joining some 60 U.S. ships and vessels of 17 other nations in the 350th anniversary of the founding of Jamestown. A second Midshipman cruise and NATO exercises in the North Atlantic closed out 1957. She began her second world cruise 23 July 1958, sailing to Naples, through the Suez Canal to India and Japan, and back to San Diego after operations with the 7th Fleet off Taiwan. She returned to Newport port via the Panama Canal 24 November 1958.

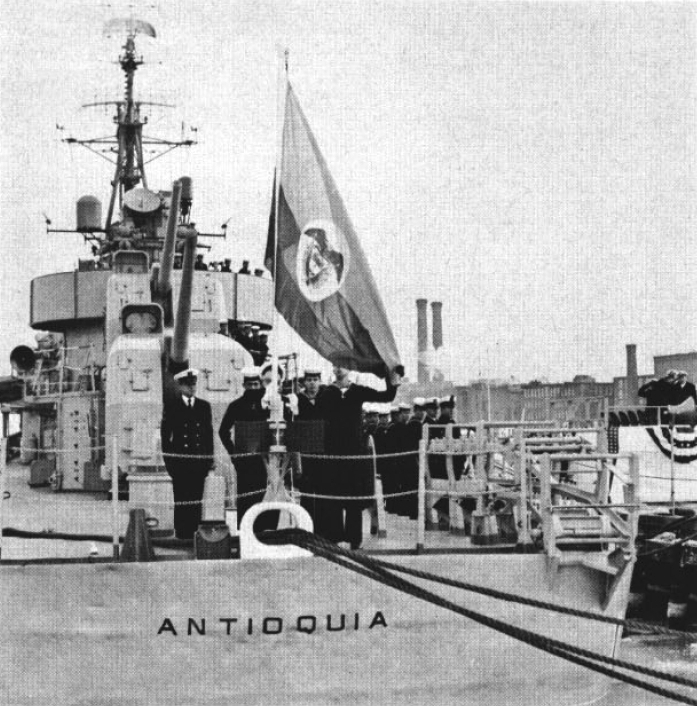
Transfer of Hale to Colombia as ARC Antioquia (DD-01), 1961.

In the Mediterranean from August 1959 – February 1960 Hale continued a peace-keeping and goodwill role. She returned to Newport 26 February 1959. After a period of important experimental work in antisubmarine warfare with nuclear submarines, Hale decommissioned at Boston 30 July 1960.

Hale received six battle stars for World War II service.

=== ARC Antioquia (DD-01) ===
Hale was transferred to Colombia 23 January 1961 under the Military Assistance Program and served as ARC Antioquia (DD-01). Antioquia was stricken 20 December 1973 and broken up for scrap.
