= Portugal–United States relations =

- Portugal: United States

Diplomatic mission
- Embassy of Portugal, Washington, D.C.: Embassy of the United States, Lisbon

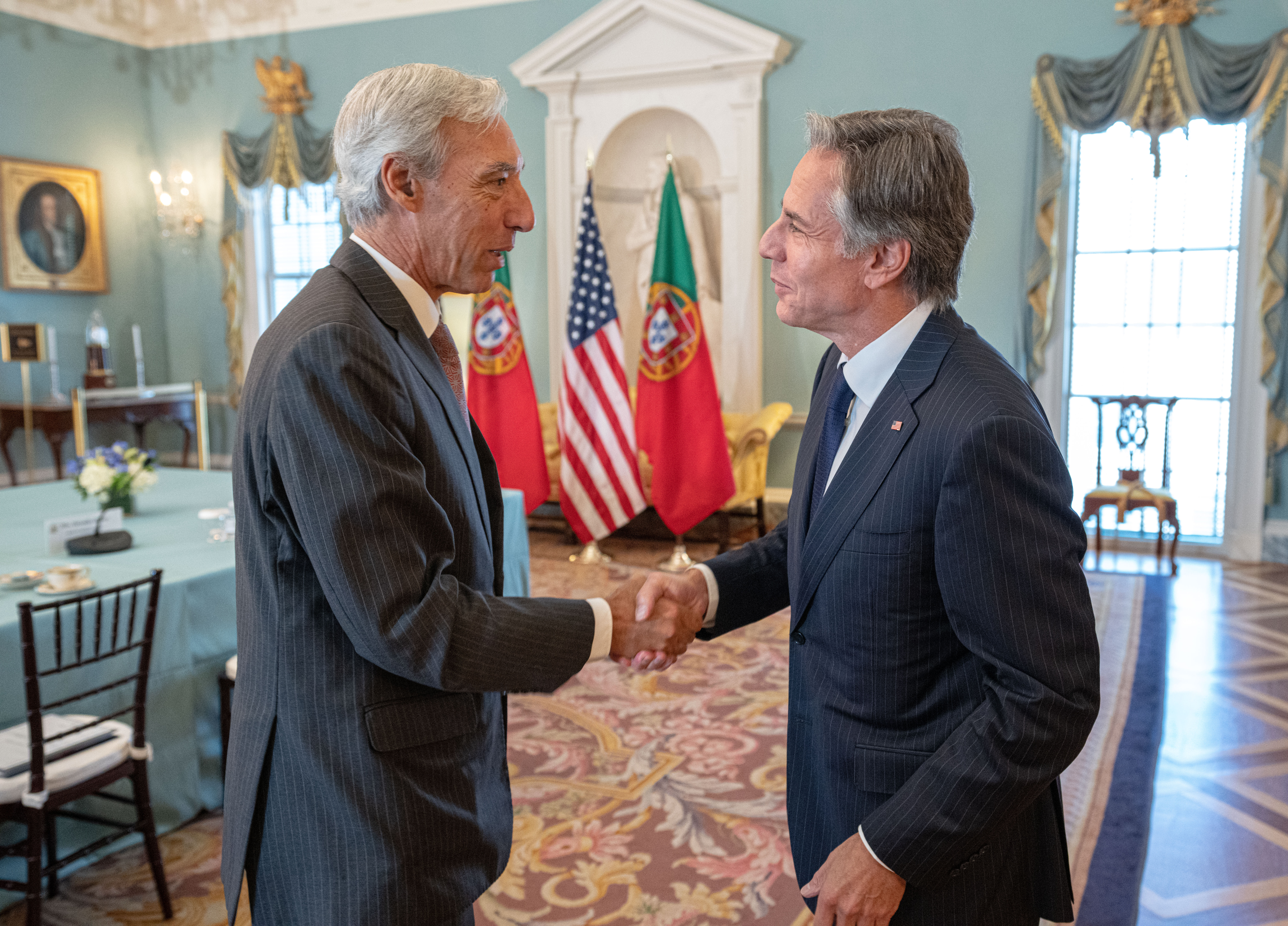
Portuguese Foreign Minister João Gomes Cravinho (left) meets with US Secretary of State Antony Blinken (right) in 2022

The relations between Portugal and the United States are the set of bilateral diplomatic, economic, historical, and cultural relations between those two countries, which have maintained bilateral relations since 1791.

== History ==
=== Early history ===
Despite various attempts to set up colonies in Newfoundland and Labrador and Nova Scotia, the Kingdom of Portugal never held any long-lasting or significant colonies in North America due to the 1494 Treaty of Tordesillas, which stipulated that the Portuguese were only allowed to set up colonies in the Old World (aside from Brazil, which the treaty failed to account for), leaving the New World open to Spanish colonization. Despite the lack of colonies, a small number of Portuguese individuals did settle in North America prior to the 19th century.

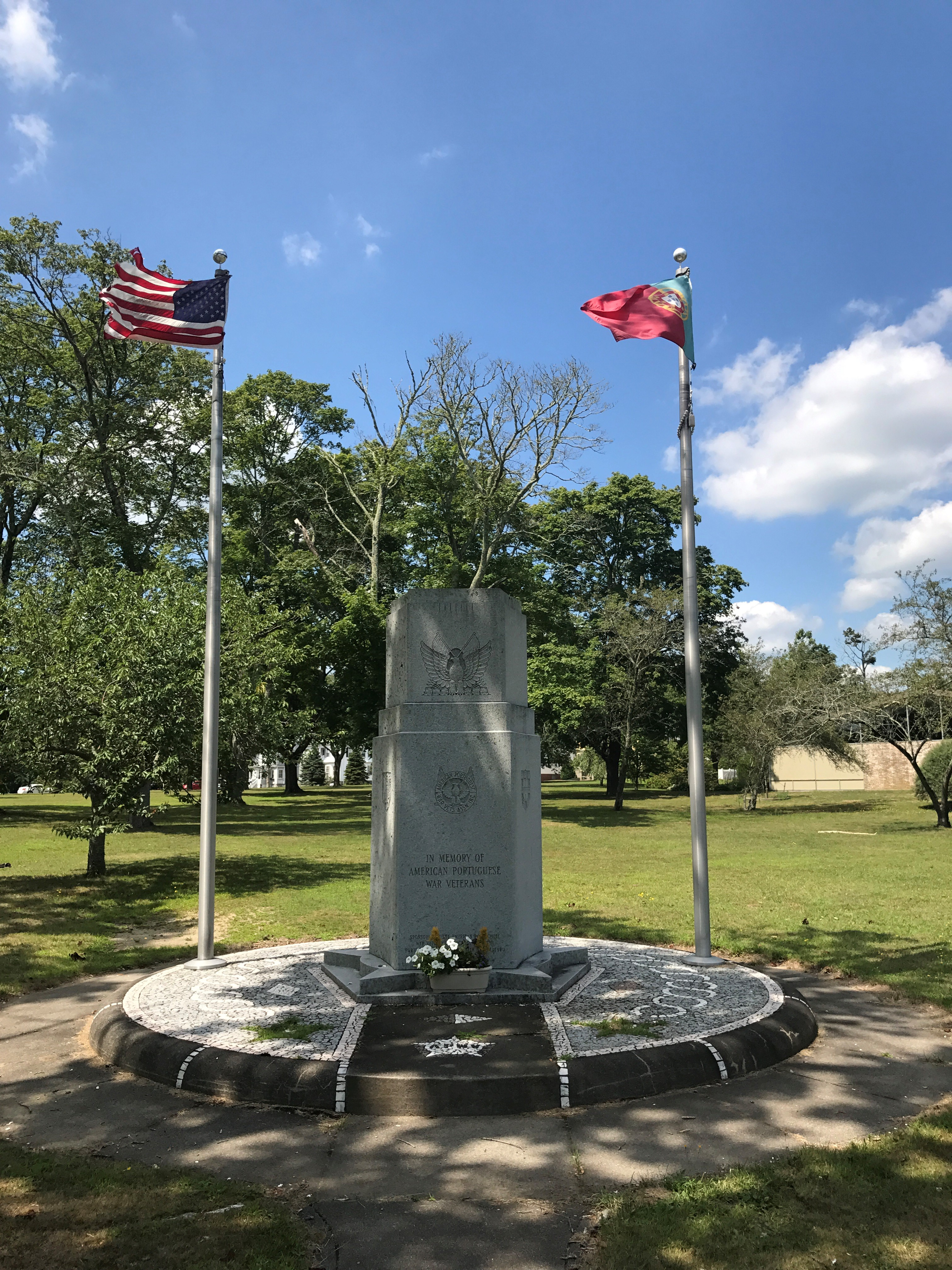
Portuguese-American Veterans Monument at New Bedford, Massachusetts with Portuguese and American flags

Unlike other European colonial powers such as France and Spain, Portugal did not intervene on behalf of the United States during the American Revolutionary War. This was because of the aforementioned lack of Portuguese colonies in North America and also because of the historic alliance between Portugal and Britain, dating back to the 14th century. Portugal remained neutral throughout the conflict, eventually joining the First League of Armed Neutrality, a league of European states organized by Catherine the Great of Russia to protect neutral shipping, which was often interrupted and seized by the Royal Navy during the war. While the Portuguese military did not participate in the war, some of the aforementioned Portuguese settlers in the Thirteen Colonies did fight, such as the "Virginia Giant" Peter Francisco, a soldier of the Continental Army who was born in the Azores.

In 1791, Portugal became the first neutral nation to establish diplomatic ties with the United States, leading to the arrival of an American legation headed by David Humphreys in Lisbon. Consular relations with the Portuguese island territories of Madeira and the Azores were established in 1790 and 1795 respectively. When the Portuguese court fled to Brazil during the Napoleonic Wars, the American legation followed the court to Rio de Janeiro in 1810 and returned with it to Lisbon in 1822.

The U.S. and Portugal fought together in the First Barbary War (1801–1805) against the Barbary corsairs in an effort to reduce piracy and disruption of trade on the Mediterranean Sea.

Increased Portuguese immigration to the United States began in the early nineteenth century. Approximately 70 percent of these immigrants came from the Azores, with the remainder mostly coming from Madeira and Cape Verde, with very few of them coming from the Portuguese mainland. Most of these Portuguese immigrants settled in New England and ended up working in the whaling industry. The involvement of Portuguese immigrants in the whaling trade also led Portuguese American communities to spring up in the San Francisco Bay Area in California and in Hawaii (see also Portuguese immigration to Hawaii). Some Portuguese immigrants settled in cities further inland, such as Springfield, Illinois. Today, there are over one million Americans of Portuguese descent. While prolific in some areas, Portuguese immigration was comparatively tiny when compared with the large number of German and Irish immigrants that came to the United States.

The Portuguese government favored the Union during the American Civil War, providing assistance to the Union Navy during the conflict. Due to settling primarily in New England, most Portuguese Americans were Union soldiers.

In 1911, the United States declared its support of the 5 October 1910 revolution that abolished the Portuguese Monarchy and replaced it with the First Portuguese Republic.

In 1916 and 1917, both Portugal and the United States, respectively, joined World War I on the side of the Allies. During World War II, Portugal remained strictly neutral until 1944 (except for the Battle of Timor, on the Pacific Front), when it allowed the United States to establish a military base in the Azores, however Portugal did not joined on any side, because Portugal made an agreement with Francoist Spain to keep Portugal and Spain neutral called Iberian Pact.

=== Contemporary era ===
Both countries remained on the same side during the Cold War, with both Portugal and the United States becoming founding members of the North Atlantic Treaty Organization (NATO) in 1949.

The harmonious relationship between Portugal and the United States was strained during the 1960s and 70s. Amid a wider global trend of decolonization, the Portuguese colonies of Angola, Mozambique, and Guinea-Bissau, all in Africa, began to demand independence from Portugal. The strain in relations was caused by the United States declaring its support for these independence movements, a move which greatly angered the Portuguese government.

Following the Portuguese Colonial War, Angola, Mozambique, and Guinea-Bissau all gained independence. The revolution brought down the dictatorial Estado Novo regime that had ruled over Portugal since 1933, beginning the country's peaceful transition towards democracy and allowing Portuguese-U.S. relations to be repaired.

In 2017 the Portuguese Minister of National Defence, José Alberto Azeredo Lopes and the Ambassador of the United States in Portugal, Robert A. Sherman, signed a new deal to strengthen cooperation in search and rescue missions in North part of Atlantic Ocean. On the US side, maritime and air search and rescue will be the responsibility of the United States Coast Guard, on the Portuguese side it will be the responsibility of the Portuguese Navy and Portuguese Air Force.

On October 8, 2026, Secretary of State Marco Rubio visited Lisbon, where he met with Portuguese Prime Minister Luís Montenegro and Foreign Minister Paulo Rangel. He affirmed the historic importance of the relationship between the two countries, stating that Portugal is a strong American ally. The visit aimed to strengthen ties between the two nations in the areas of defense, technology, and the economy.

== Military ==
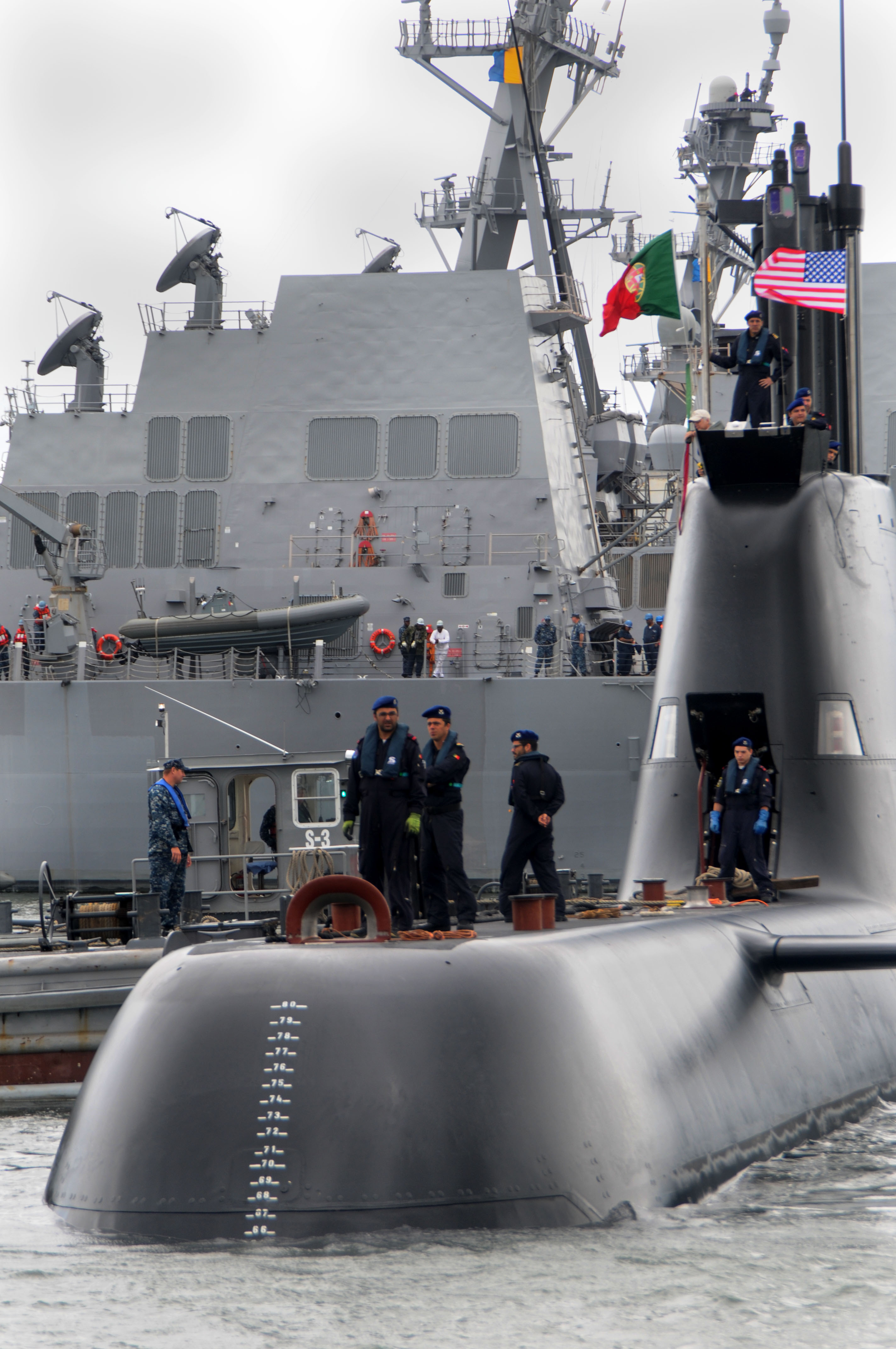
NRP Tridente (S160) of the Portuguese Navy at Naval Station Norfolk.

Since the Carnation Revolution and the end of the Cold War, Portugal and the United States have remained close allies, fighting together in the NATO intervention in Bosnia and Herzegovina, the NATO intervention in Kosovo, the Iraq War, and the War in Afghanistan.

The defense relationship between the United States and Portugal is centered on the 1995 Agreement on Cooperation and Defense (ACD). For 50 years, Lajes Field in the Azores has played an important role in supporting U.S. military aircraft (its importance such that the US had a contingency plan in 1975 to stimulate Azores independence in the event of a Communist takeover of Portugal). Most recent missions are engaged in counter-terrorism and humanitarian efforts, including operations in Afghanistan and Iraq. Portugal also provides the United States access to Montijo Air Base and several ports. Portugal was also, along with the United States, one of the founding members of NATO.

Portugal defines itself as "Atlanticist" emphasizing its support for strong European ties with the United States, particularly on defense and security issues. The Government of Portugal has been a key ally in US, supporting efforts in Iraq, and hosting the Azores Summit, where on March 16, 2003, Spanish Prime Minister, José María Aznar, UK Prime Minister, Tony Blair, President of the United States George W. Bush, and Prime Minister of Portugal, José Manuel Durão Barroso discussed the invasion of Iraq.

The Portuguese Marine Corps of the Portuguese Navy together with the United States Marine Corps, has carried out several joint military exercises in the last years.

The annual Real Thaw military exercise of the Portuguese Air Force counts with the participation of the American Air Force since 2013.

The United States Department of Defense has supported the last depolyments of Portuguese Army soldiers during the Resolute Support Mission in Afghanistan, with 15 International MaxxPro and 7 Oshkosh M-ATV to protect the Kabul International Airport.

Over the last few years, the Portuguese and American military have carried out several missions in Eastern Europe, namely in Romania and Lithuania.

In 2023, Portuguese Paratroopers participated with the 82nd Airborne Division in the International Exercise "Operation Toy Drop 23", in Fort Bragg, North Carolina. At the end of the year, the portuguese Port of Setúbal began to be used by the United States Army as one of its important logistical hubs for sending military equipment between the United States and Europe. The American military said it would return to using this port over the next few years, reinforcing military cooperation between the two countries.

Between April and June 2024, the Portuguese Navy's submarine NRP Arpão included military personnel from the United States, Canada and Denmark in its crew during several surveillance operations on Russian ships, having even sailed under Arctic ice. In addition to surveillance missions, the submarine also participated in the Noble Shield 24 and Operation Brilliant Shield exercises. Also military exercises between the Special Actions Detachment and the US Navy SEALS were held in 2024 in Eastern Europe.

In January 2025, Portugal joined the National Guard Bureau State Partnership Program, which will allow an increase in the number of military exercises between the Portuguese Armed Forces and the US National Guard.

Portugal did not directly participate in the 2026 US-Israeli war with Iran, but played an indirect role by authorizing the use of Lajes Air Base by the US. This authorization was granted by the Portuguese government following a formal American request, within the framework of existing military cooperation agreements between the two countries and collaboration within NATO. The base was primarily used as a logistical and support point for military operations. US military aircraft, including refueling and transport aircraft, made stopovers or passed through the base during operations related to the attacks. According to the Portuguese government, the decision to allow the use of the base respected bilateral treaties with the United States and does not imply direct participation by Portugal in military operations, being presented as part of strategic cooperation between the two countries.

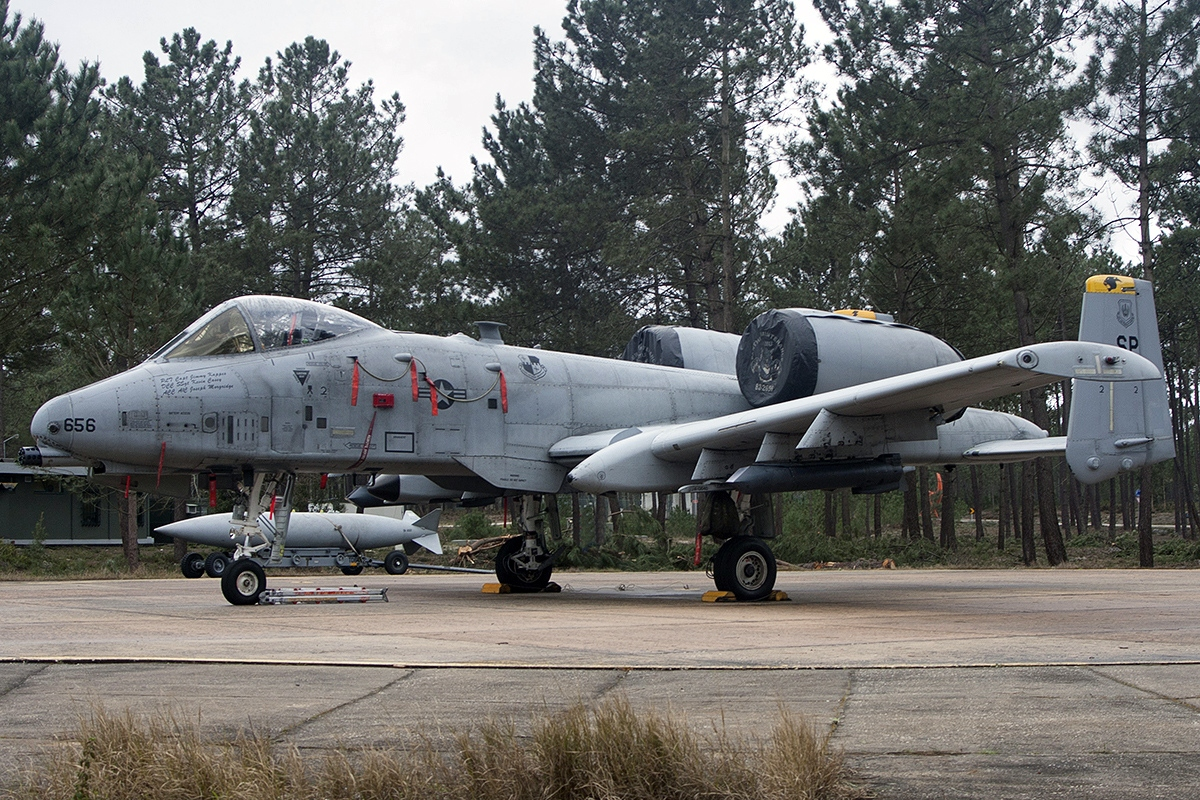
A-10 Thunderbolt II of the USAF in the Portuguese Monte Real Air Base.

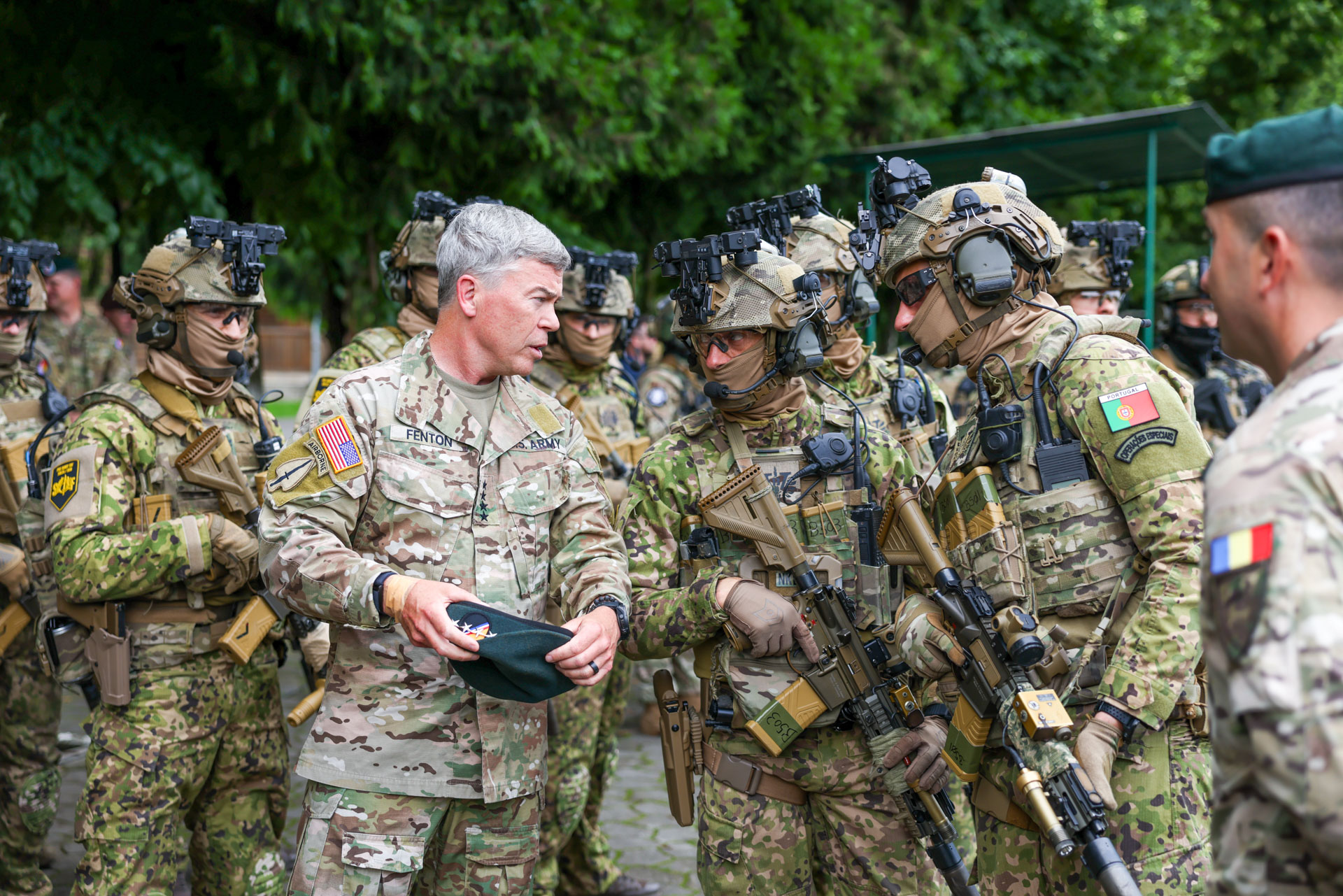
U.S. Army Gen. Bryan Fenton, commander of U.S. Special Operations Command shows his Green Beret selection number to Portuguese Army Rangers

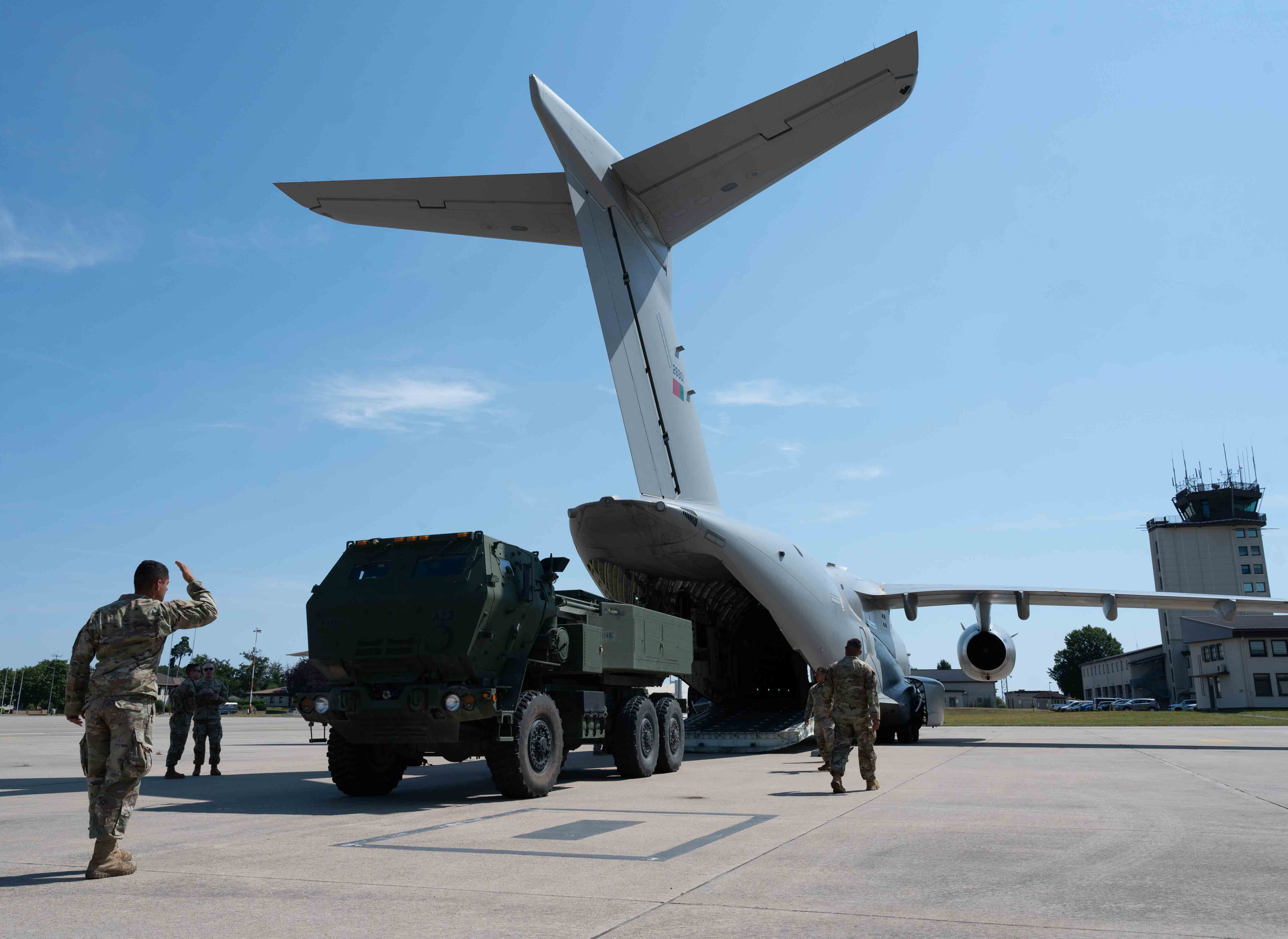
U.S. and Portuguese service members guide an M142 HIMARS out of a Portuguese KC-390 Millennium

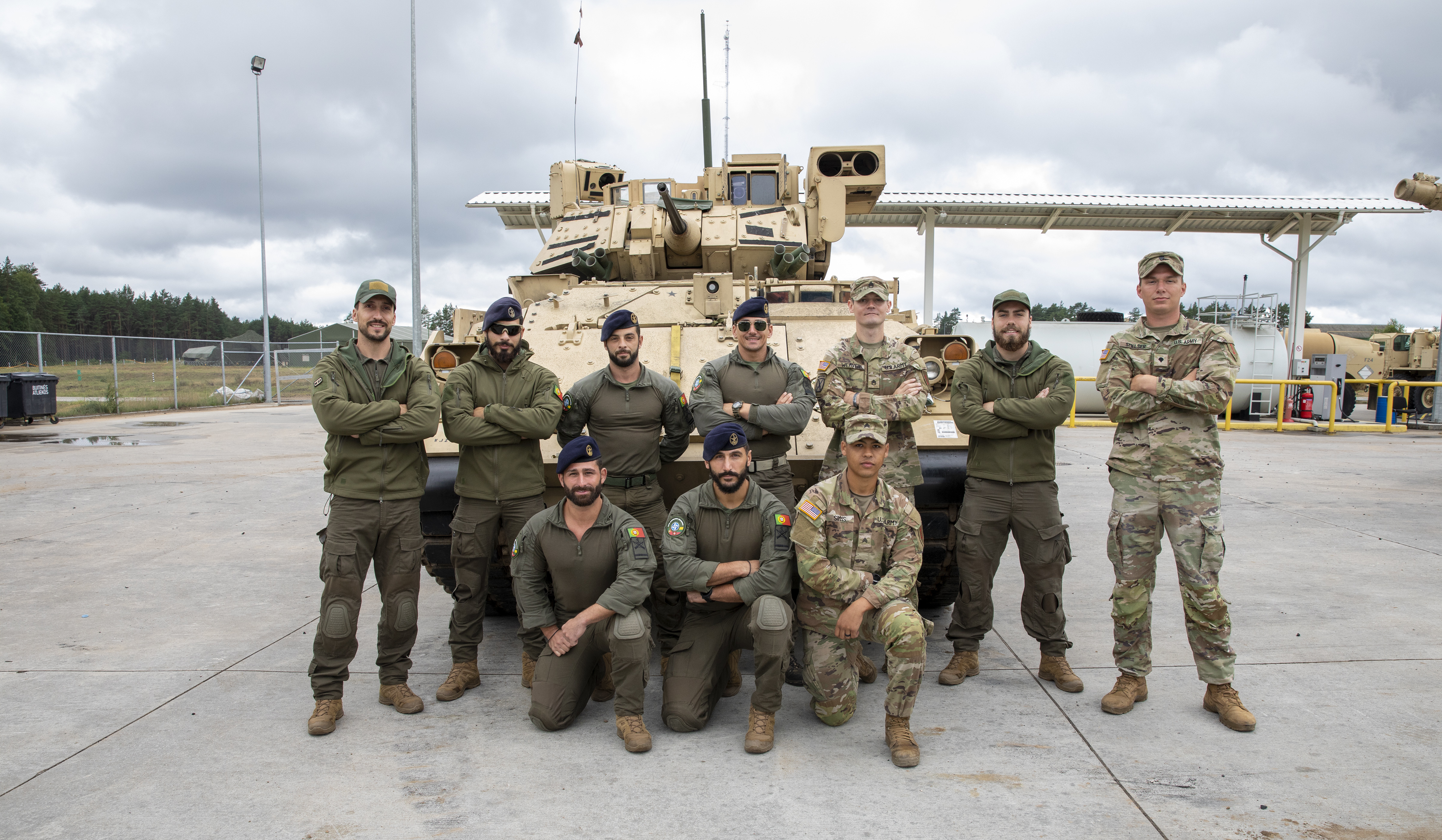
Soldiers from the 66th Armored Regiment pose with members of the Portuguese Marine Force at Pabradė Training Area, Lithuania.

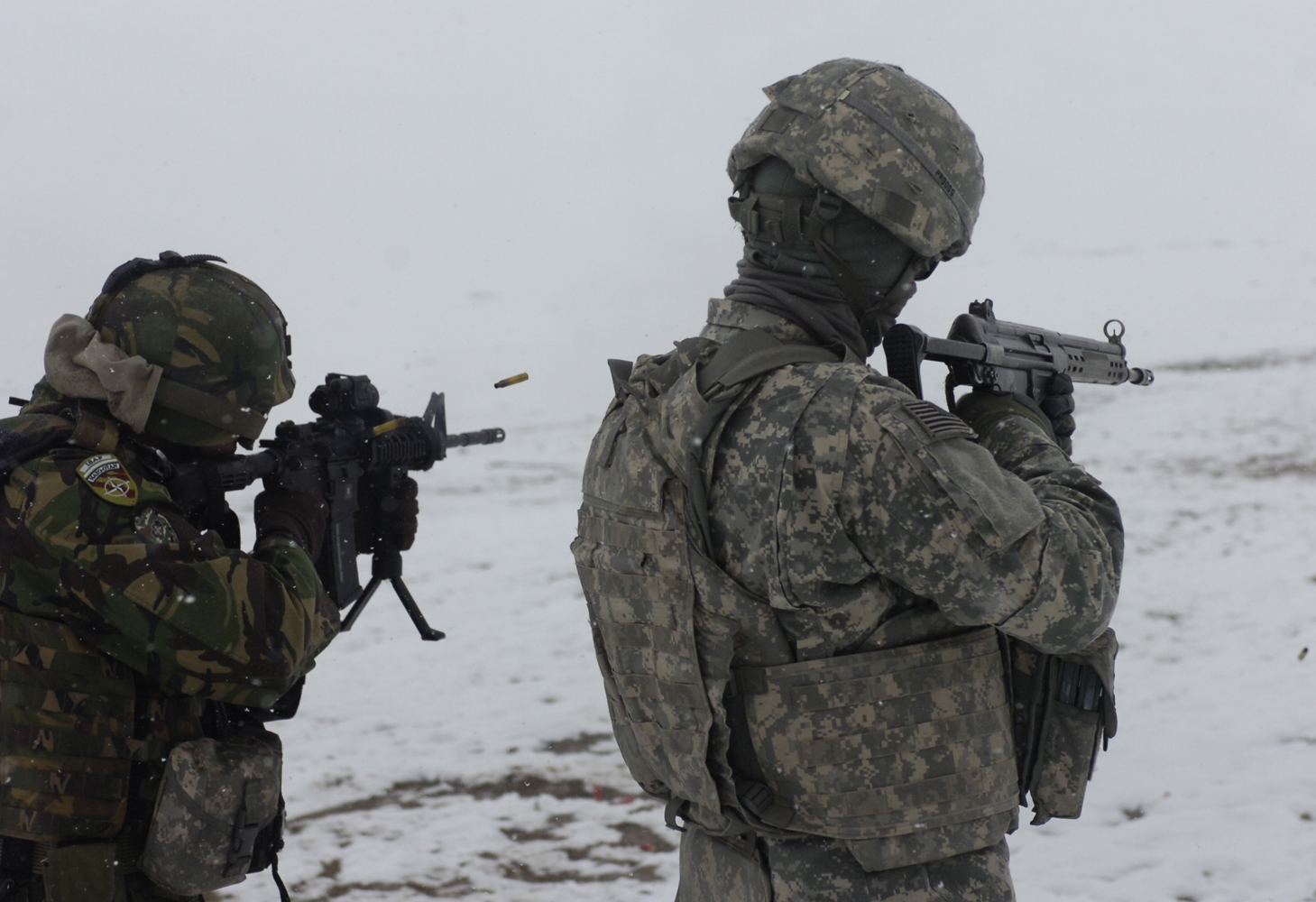
Soldier from the 181st Infantry Regiment trains with Portuguese Commandos in Kabul.

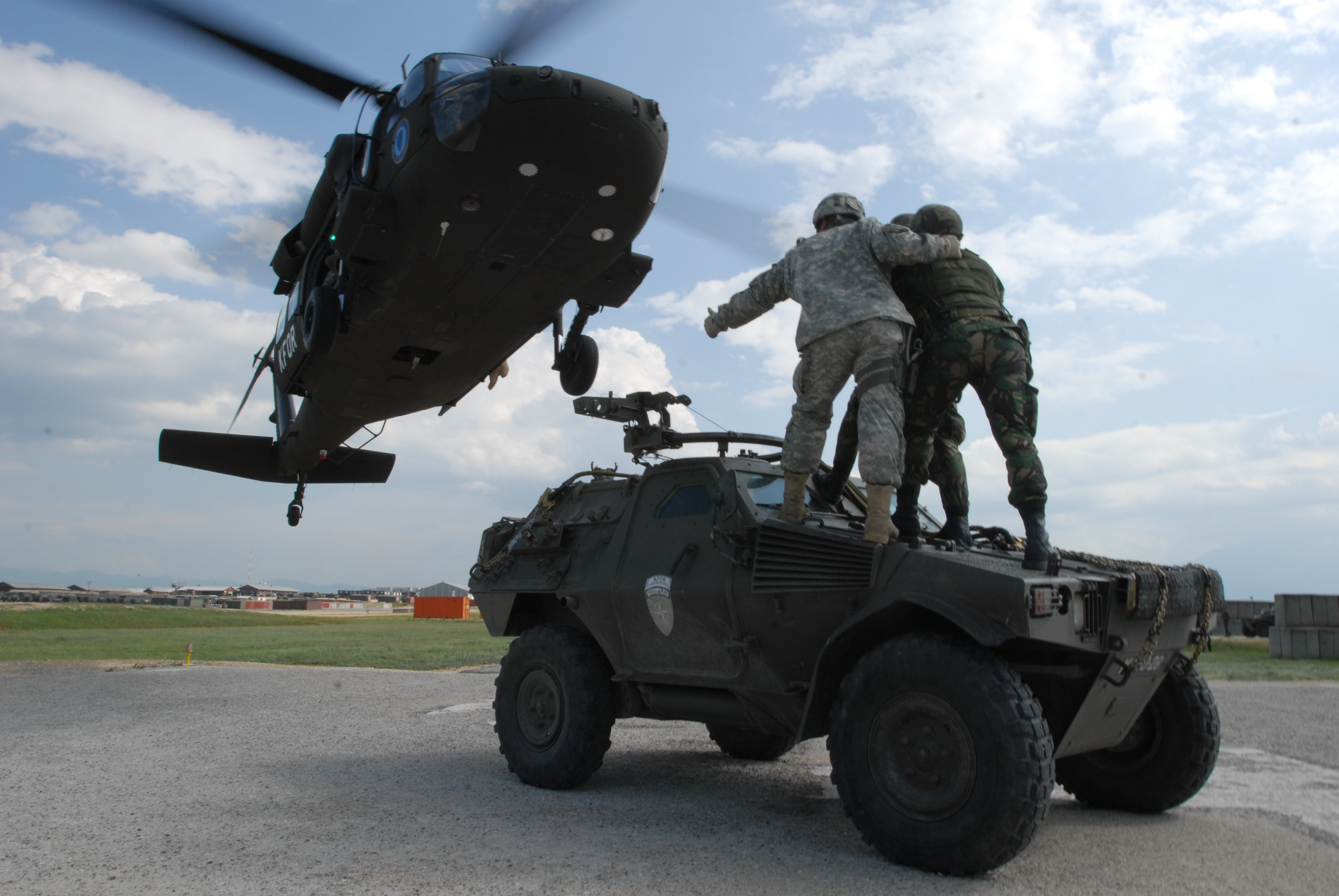
Portuguese soldiers hook their Panhard VBL to an UH-60 Blackhawk of the 224th Aviation Regiment.

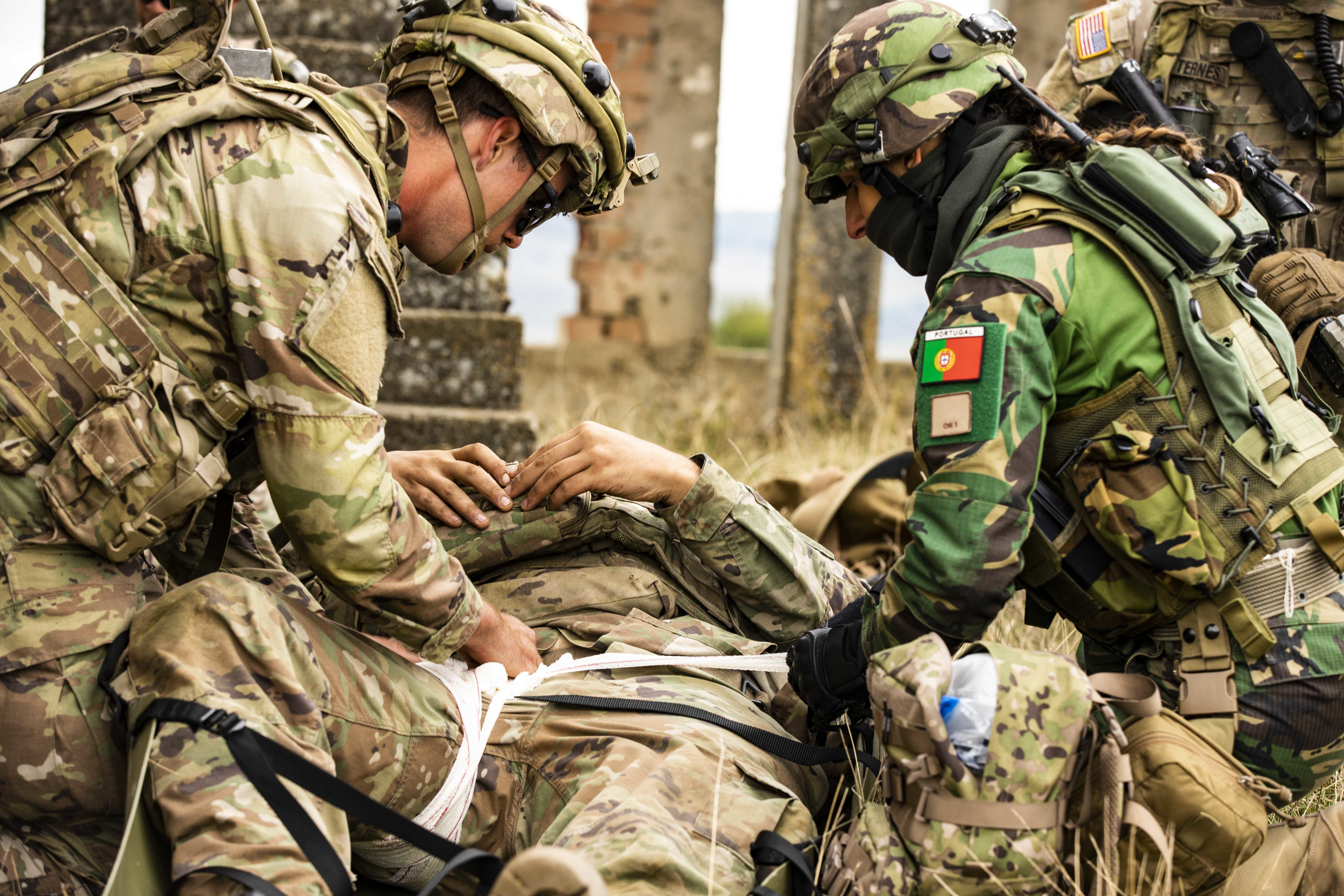
A U.S. Army Soldier assigned to Alpha Company, 1st Battalion, 16th Infantry Regiment “Iron Rangers,” and a Portuguese Soldier provide tactical medical care for a simulated casualty in Romania.

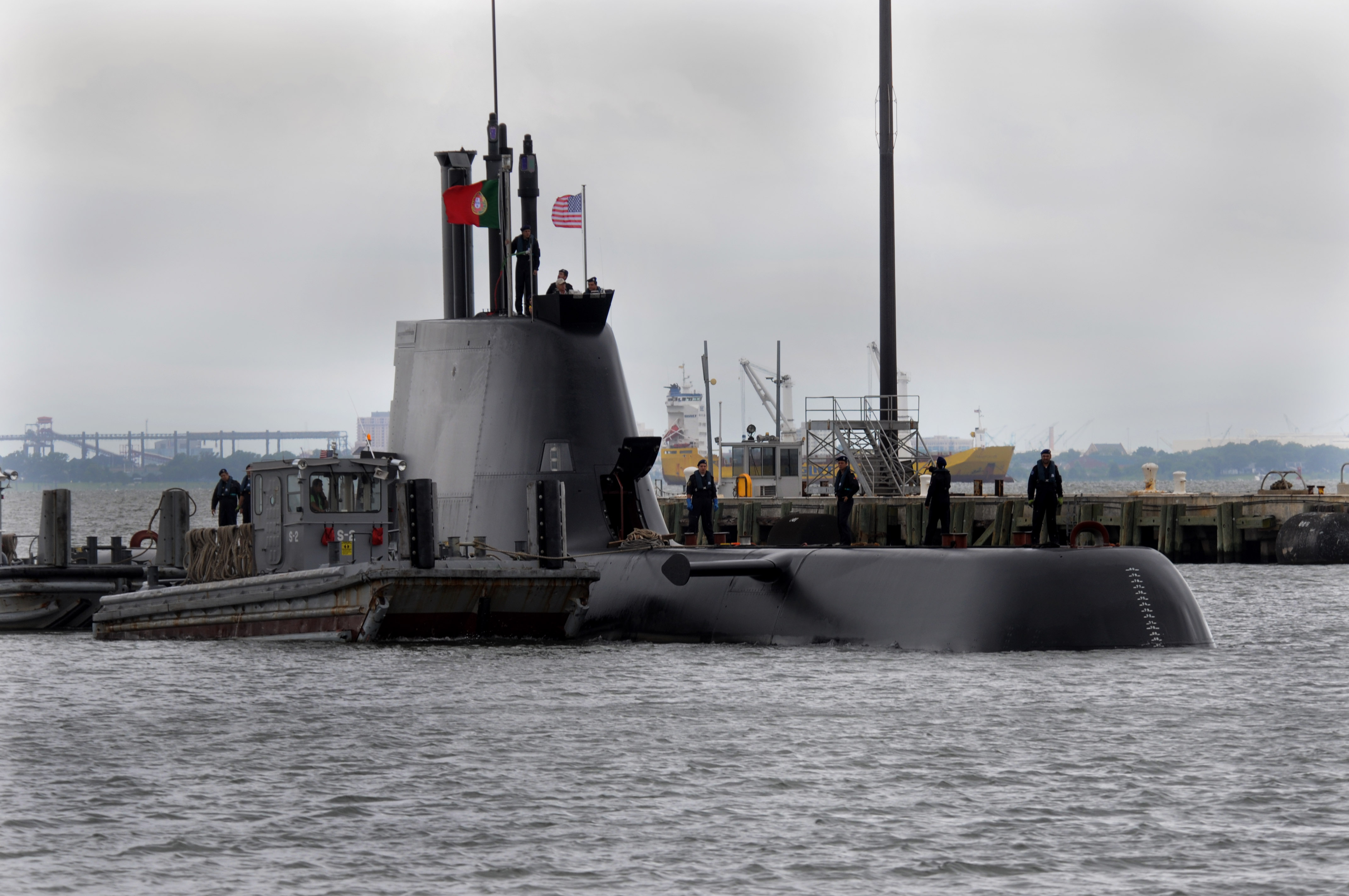
Portuguese Submarine NRP Tridente (S160) at Naval Station Norfolk.

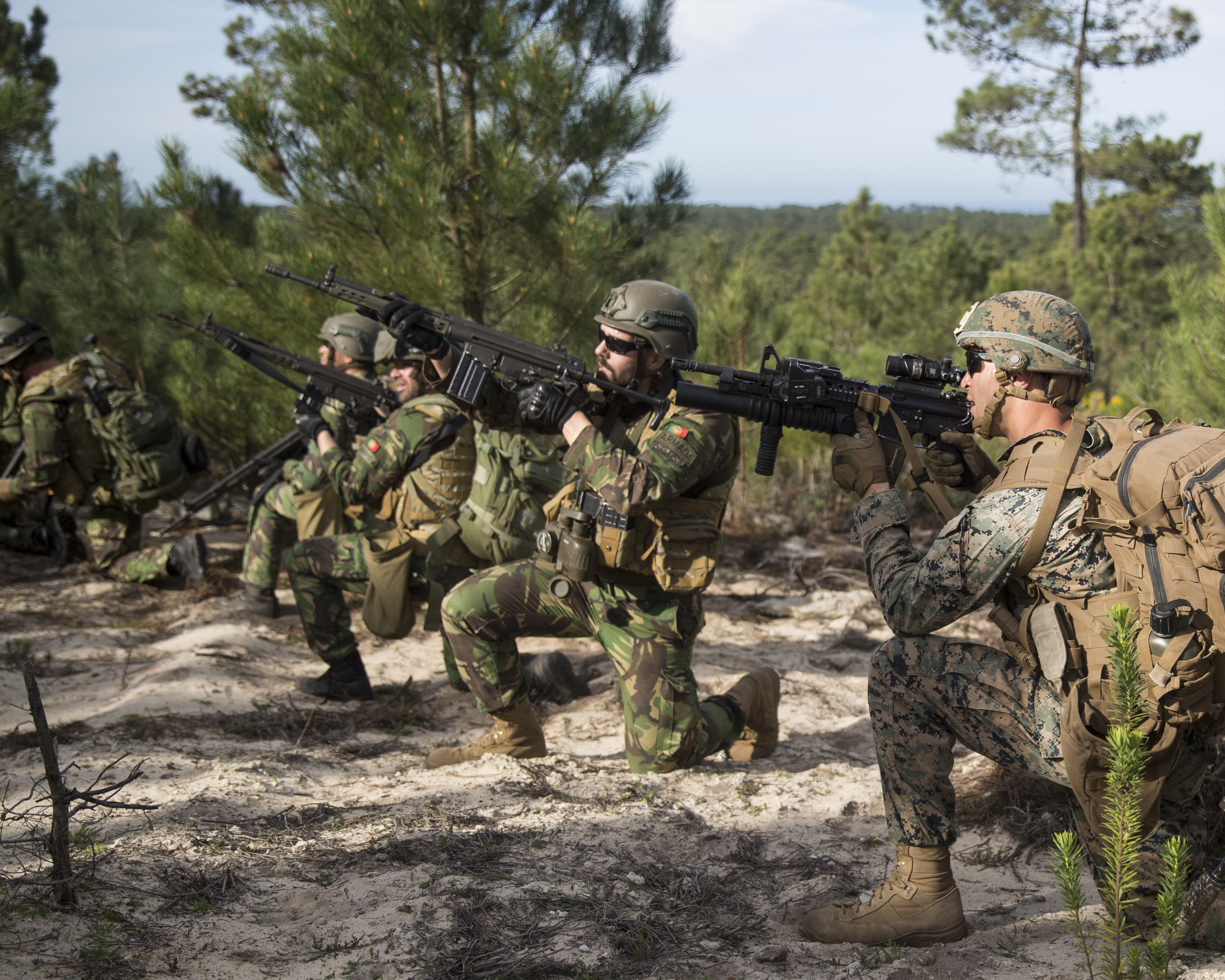
Portuguese marines and a U.S. Marine with Special Purpose Marine Air-Ground Task Force-Crisis Response-Africa 19.1.

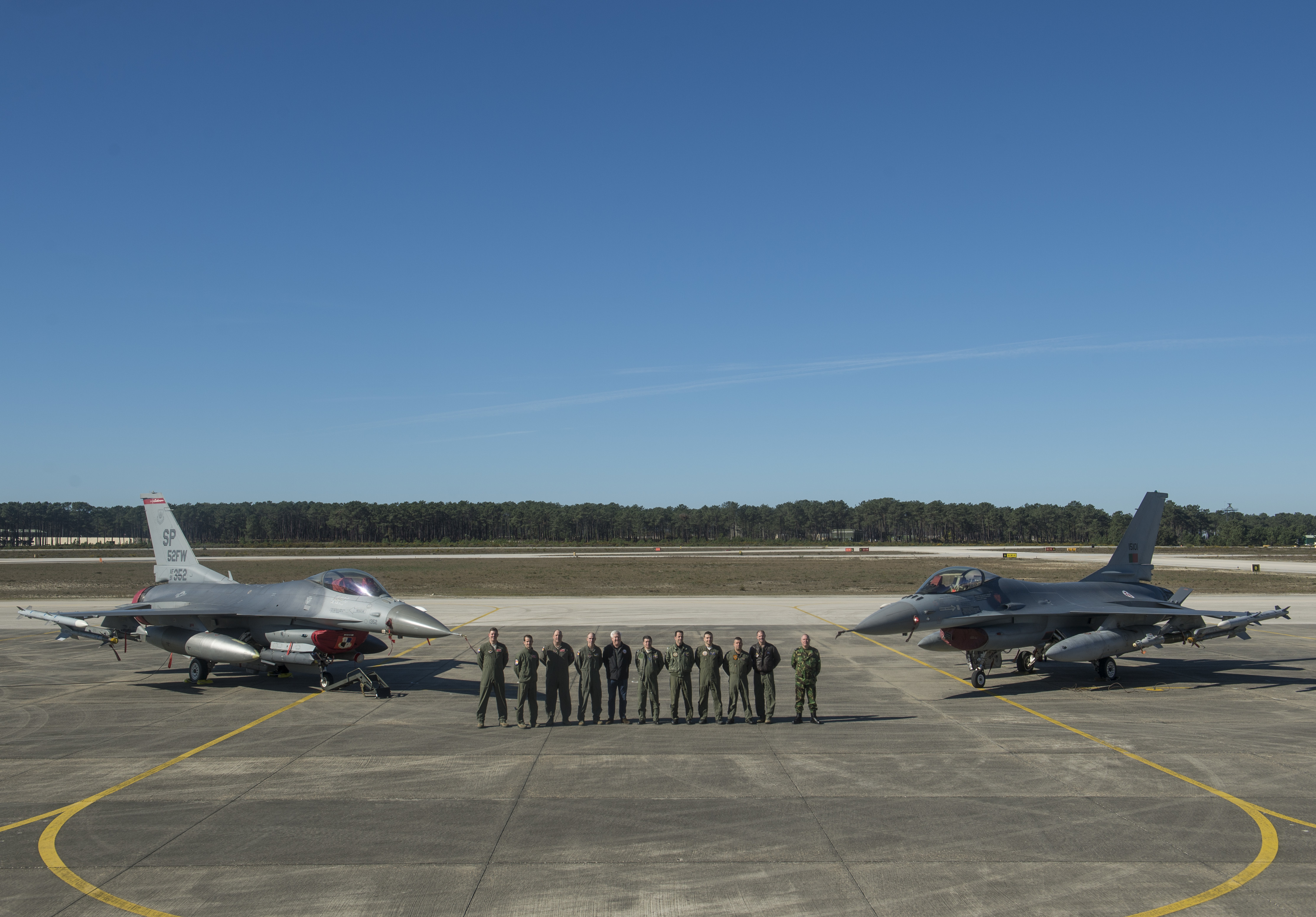
480th Expeditionary Fighter Squadron during a Flying Training Deployment at Monte Real Air Base together with a Portuguese F-16 Squadron.

== Economic ==
The United States of America stands out as one of Portugal's main trading partners and is Portugal's largest trading partner outside the European Union.

According to data from the National Institute of Statistics, in 2022 the USA was the 4th customer of Portuguese exports, with a share of 7% of the total, and occupied the 8th position in terms of imports (3.28% of the total).

In 2021, the value of Portuguese exports to the United States was 4,490 million dollars and that of imports reached 2,340 million dollars.

Most of the products exported by Portugal to the United States of America are chemical products, mineral fuels, machinery, plastics and rubber, electronical equipment, textile materials, wood and cork, common metals and minerals, and ores. Conversely, groups of products made up of mineral fuels, agricultural products, machinery and apparatus, vehicles and other transport material, chemical products, plastics and rubber, optical and precision instruments, and common metals stand out in terms of American exports to Portugal.

The Government of Portugal is encouraging greater bilateral investment. US firms play some significant roles in the pharmaceutical, computer, and retail sectors in Portugal, particularly in Lisbon, but their involvement in the automotive sector has sharply declined in recent years.

== Official meetings ==
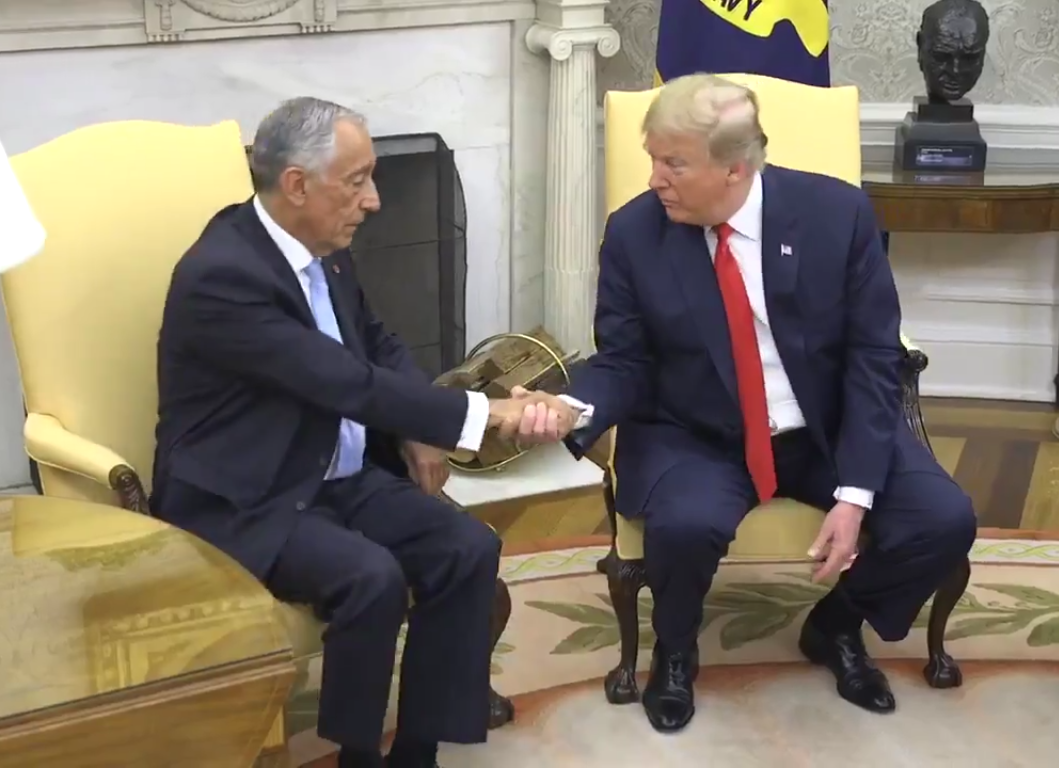
Portuguese President Marcelo Rebelo de Sousa and Donald Trump during a meet in the Oval Office.

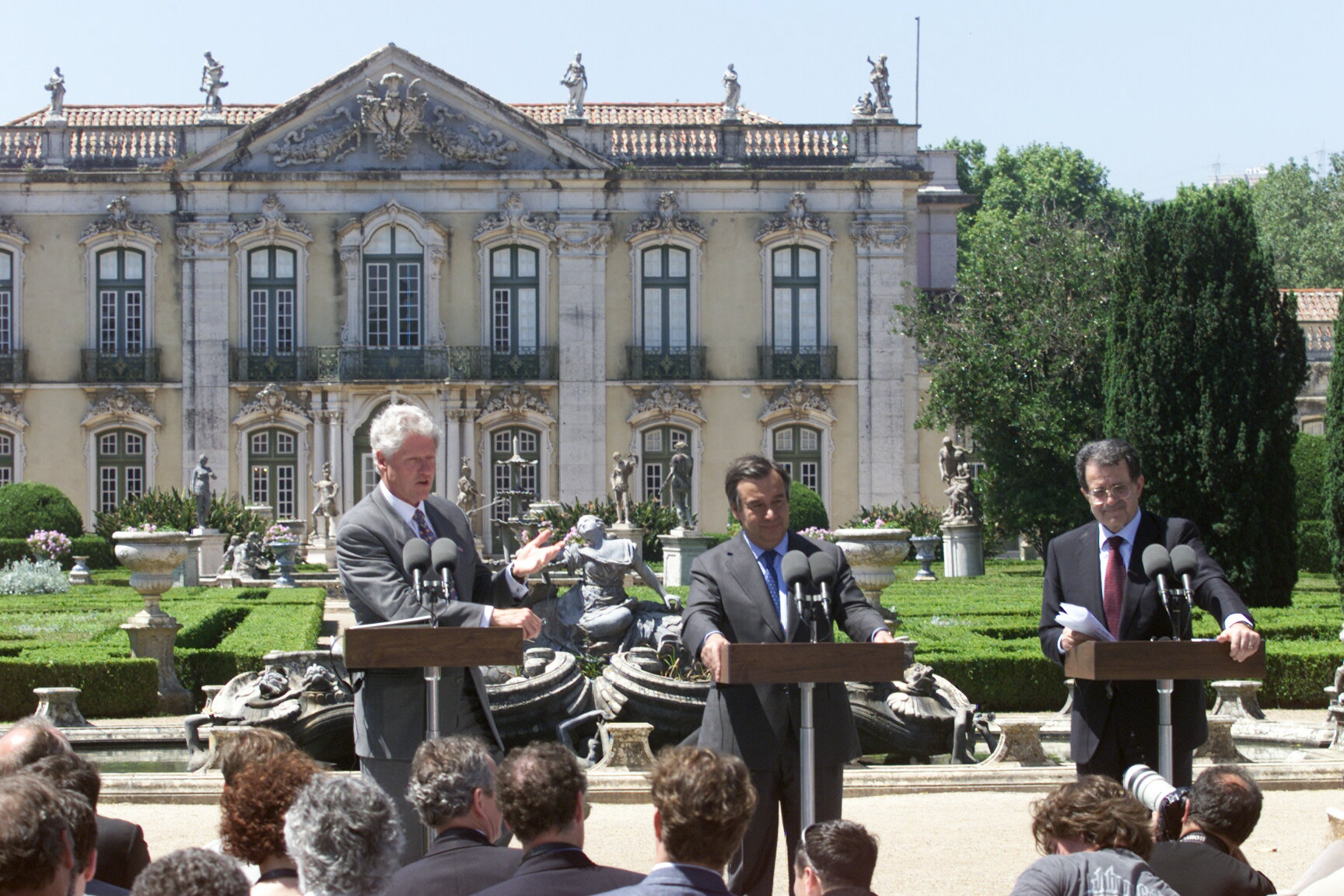
President Bill Clinton with Portuguese Prime Minister António Guterres during a press conference in front of the Palace of Queluz, in 2000.

Presidential visits from United States to Portugal

- President Dwight D. Eisenhower (1960)
- President Jimmy Carter (1980)
- President Ronald Reagan (1985)
- President George H. W. Bush (1994)
- Vice President Al Gore (1996)
- President Bill Clinton (2000)
- President George W. Bush (2003)
- President Barack Obama (2010)

Presidential visits from Portugal to United States

- President António Ramalho Eanes (1978)
- Prime Minister Francisco Pinto Balsemão (1982)
- President António Ramalho Eanes (1983)
- President Mário Soares (1987)
- President Mário Soares (1989)
- President Mário Soares (1993)
- President Jorge Sampaio (2000)
- President Aníbal Cavaco Silva (2007)
- President Aníbal Cavaco Silva (2011)
- President Aníbal Cavaco Silva (2014)
- President Aníbal Cavaco Silva (2015)
- President Marcelo Rebelo de Sousa (2016)
- President Marcelo Rebelo de Sousa and Prime Minister António Costa (2018)
- President Marcelo Rebelo de Sousa (2022)

== Resident diplomatic missions ==
Portugal has diplomatic missions in:

- Washington, D.C. (Embassy)
- Boston (Consulate-General)
- New York City (Consulate-General)
- Newark (Consulate-General)
- San Francisco (Consulate-General)
- New Bedford (Consulate)
- Providence (Vice-Consulate)

United States has diplomatic missions in:

- Lisbon (Embassy)
- Ponta Delgada (Consulate)

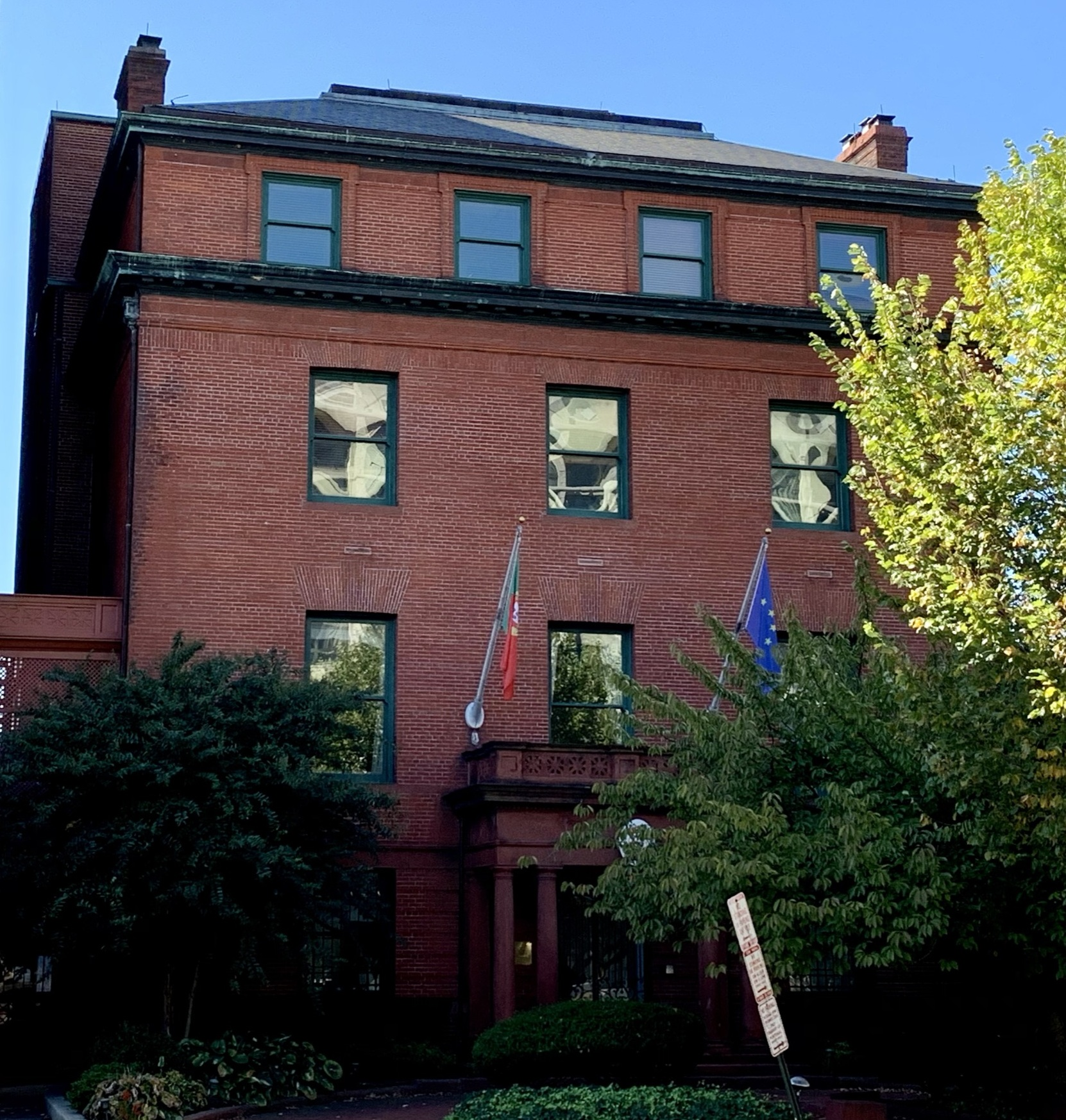
Embassy of Portugal in Washington, D.C.

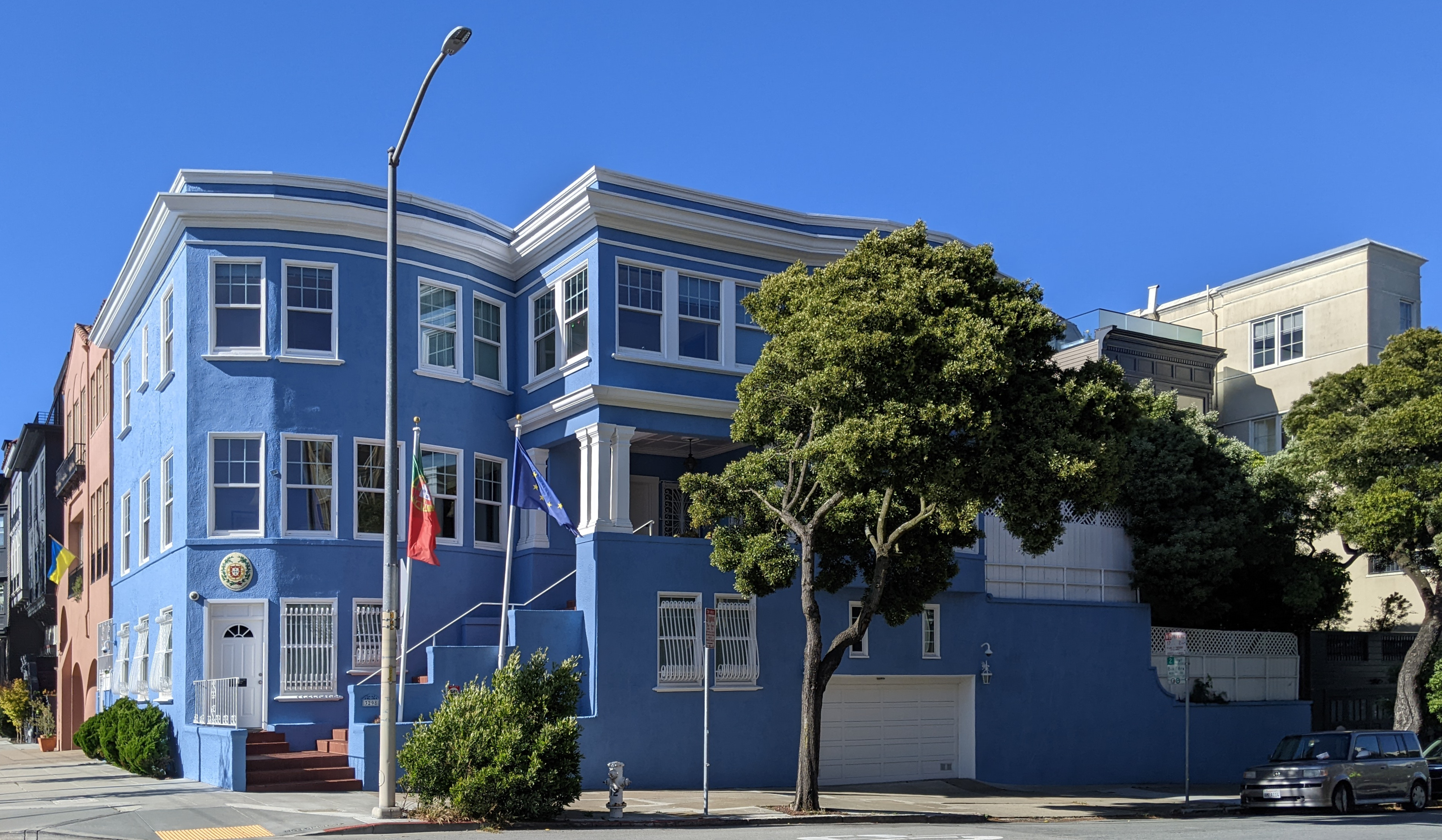
Consulate-General of Portugal in San Francisco

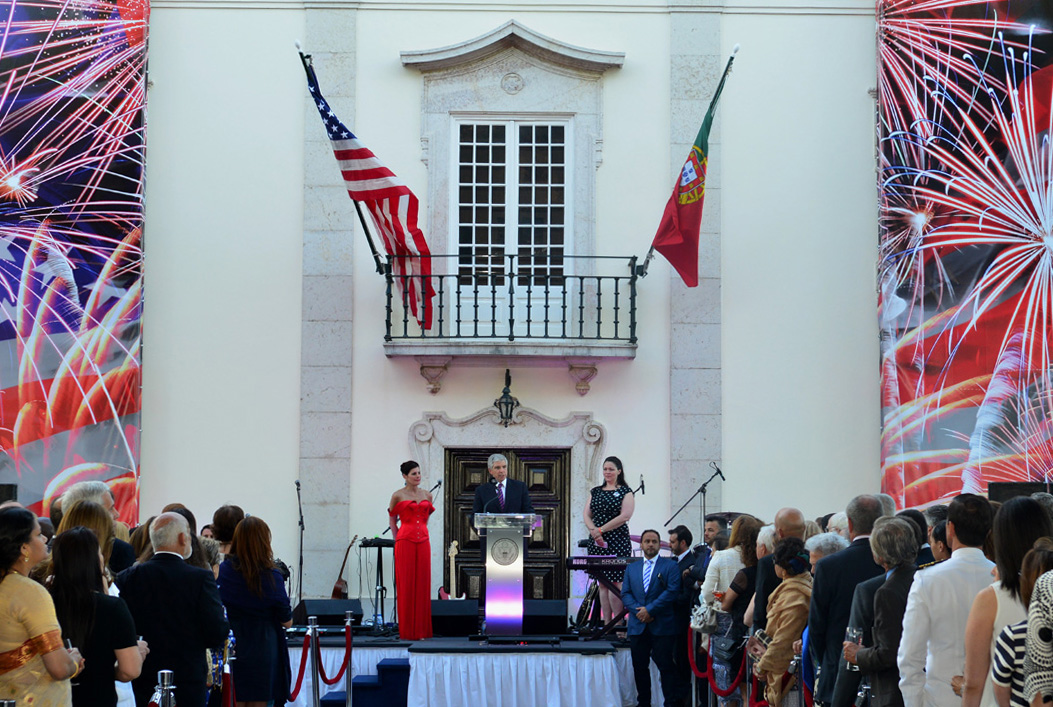
Embassy of the United States in Lisbon

== See also ==
- Foreign relations of Portugal
- Foreign relations of the United States
- Portuguese Americans
- Portuguese-American neighborhoods
- United States–European Union relations
- List of ambassadors of the United States to Portugal
- List of ambassadors of Portugal to the United States
