= Tridente-class submarine =

Submarine class of the Portuguese Navy

- Tridente-class profile

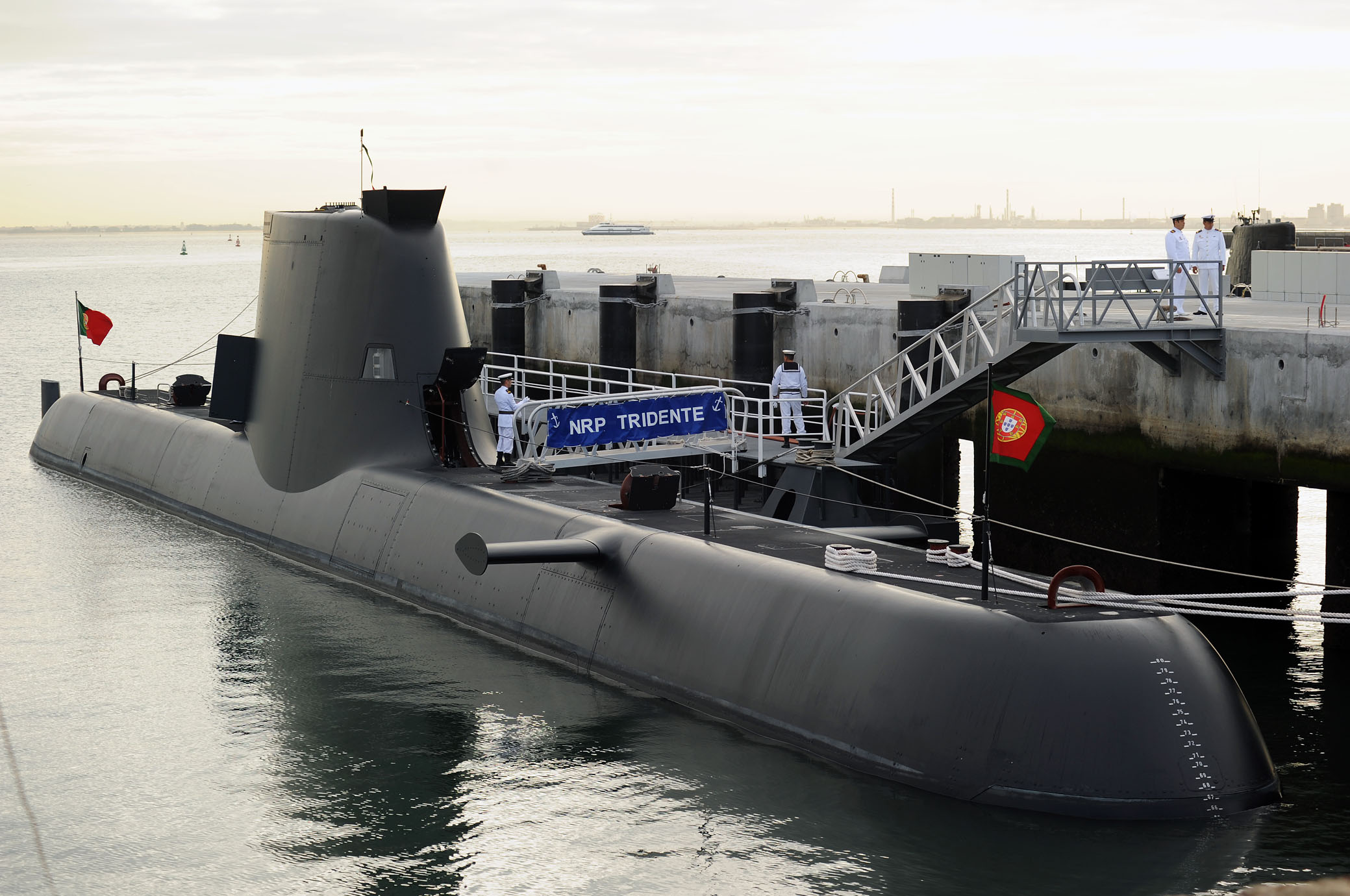
- NRP Tridente at the Lisbon Naval Base

Class overview
- Builders: HDW
- Operators: Portuguese Navy
- Preceded by: Albacora class
- Built: 2005–2010
- In commission: 2010–present
- Planned: 3
- Completed: 2
- Canceled: 1

General characteristics
- Type: Attack submarine
- Displacement: 1,700 tons (surfaced); 2,020 tons (submerged)
- Length: 67.7 m (222 ft 1 in)
- Beam: 6.35 m (20 ft 10 in)
- Draught: 6.6 m (21 ft 8 in)
- Propulsion: Diesel-electric, fuel cell AIP, low noise skew back propeller
- Speed: 20 knots (37 km/h; 23 mph) submerged; 10 knots (19 km/h; 12 mph) surfaced; 6 knots (11 km/h; 6.9 mph) AIP system
- Range: 12,000 nmi (22,000 km; 14,000 mi) at 8 knots (15 km/h; 9.2 mph)
- Endurance: 45 days
- Test depth: superior to 300 m (984 ft)
- Capacity: 14
- Complement: 7 officers; 10 petty officers; 16 enlisted
- Sensors & processing systems: Kelvin Hughes KH-1007 (F) navigation radar; Atlas Elektronik GmbH ISUS 90 combat management system
- Armament: (8) 533 mm (21.0 in) torpedo tubes, (4) subHarpoon-capable; 12 × WASS Blackshark torpedo reloads

The Tridente-class submarines, also designated as U 209PN, are diesel-electric submarines based on the Type 214 submarine developed by Howaldtswerke-Deutsche Werft GmbH (HDW) for the Portuguese Navy.

This class of submarines was acquired by Portugal to replace the previous submarines of the Albacora class, then being operated by the navy. Originally, HDW proposed the Type 209 submarine (U-209) during the competition, but decided to later enter a new proposal based on the Type 214. It is for this reason that the Tridente class is commonly designated as the U 209PN.

The class and its ships are the first to not be named after marine animals, thus breaking a tradition retracing back to 1913, when the first submarine entered service with the Portuguese Navy.

== Design ==
The Tridente-class submarines are diesel-electric boats with an advanced air-independent propulsion (AIP) system. Their propulsion is exclusively electric, with electric motors powered by batteries. These batteries may be charged while submerged by "fuel-cells" (inverse electrolysis) for which, this submarine carries a huge supply of liquid oxygen and hydrogen. Also, and solely as a second solution for recharging the batteries, this submarine carries two powerful diesel-electric generators (1,000 KVA) for use when surfaced, or at snorkel depth.

Submerged, from Lisbon, Portugal, submarines of the class may reach the Cape of Good Hope and return, in 15 days.

== Boats ==
Pennant	Name	Laid down	Commissioned	Status
S160	NRP Tridente	2005	May 2010	In service
S161	NRP Arpão	2005	December 2010	In service

== Image gallery ==
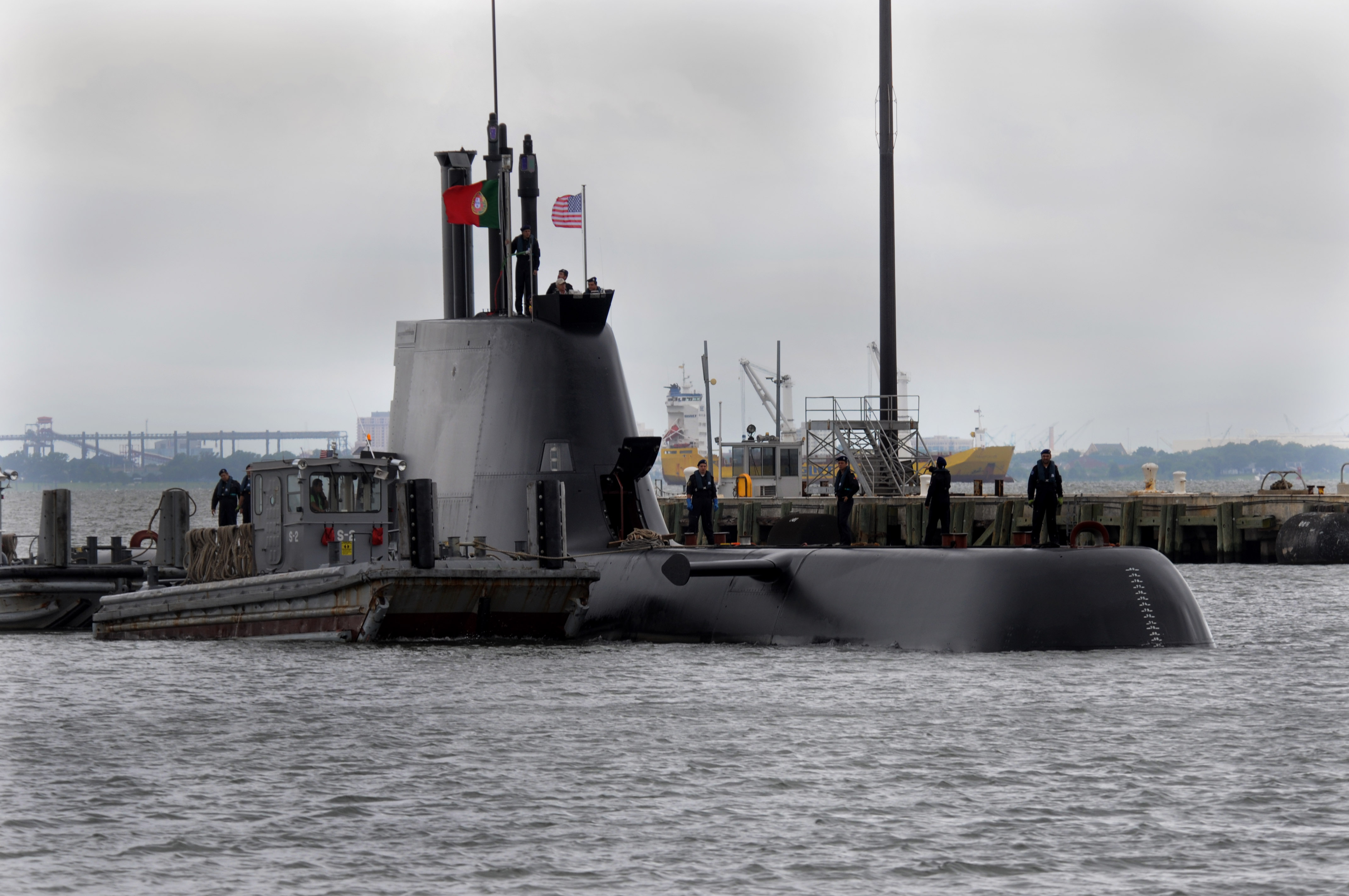
Portuguese Navy submarine NRP Tridente at Naval Station Norfolk

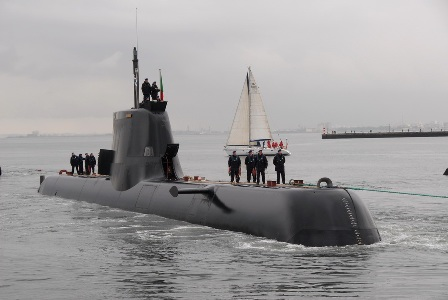
NRP Arpão at Lisbon Naval Base

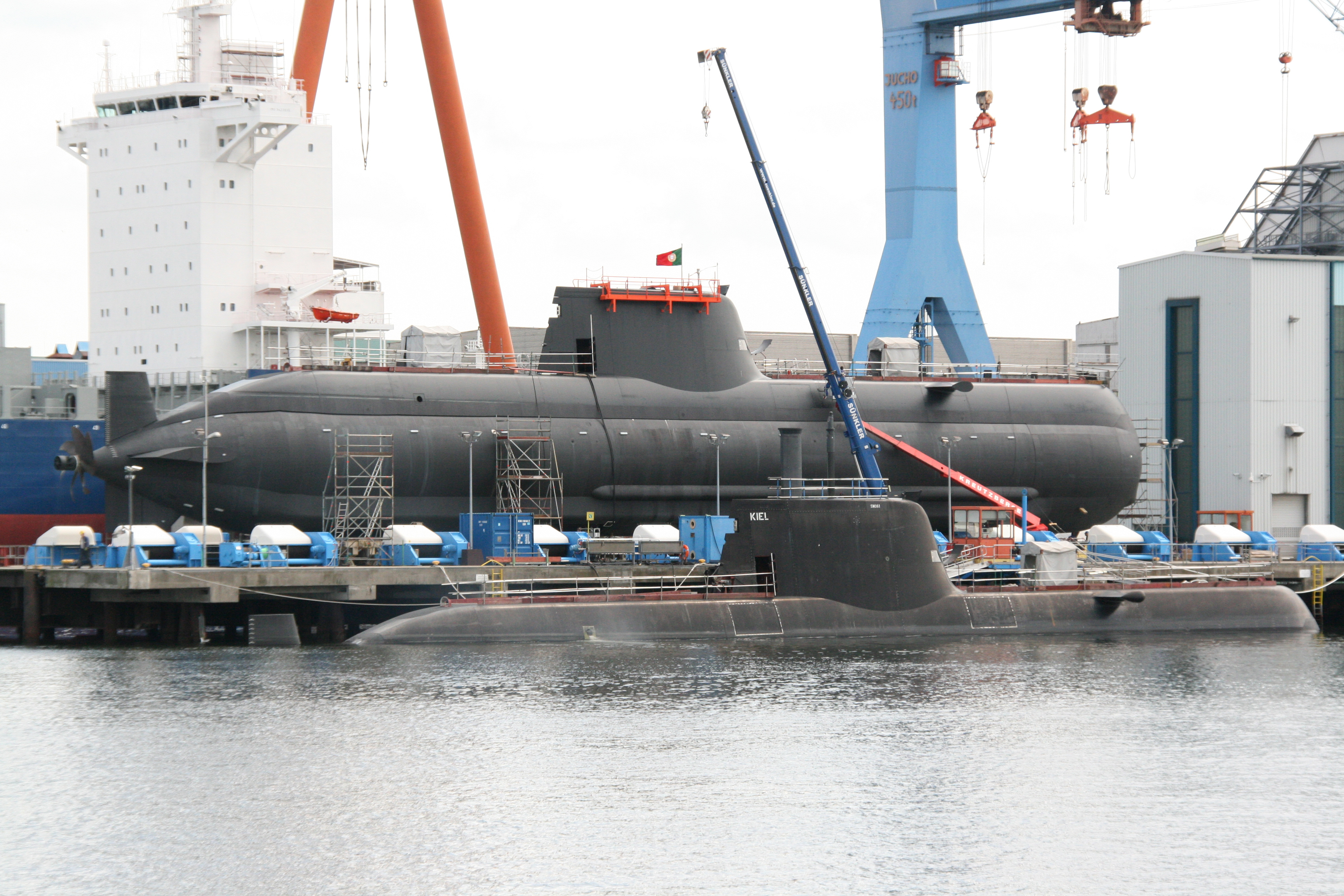
NRP Tridente under construction

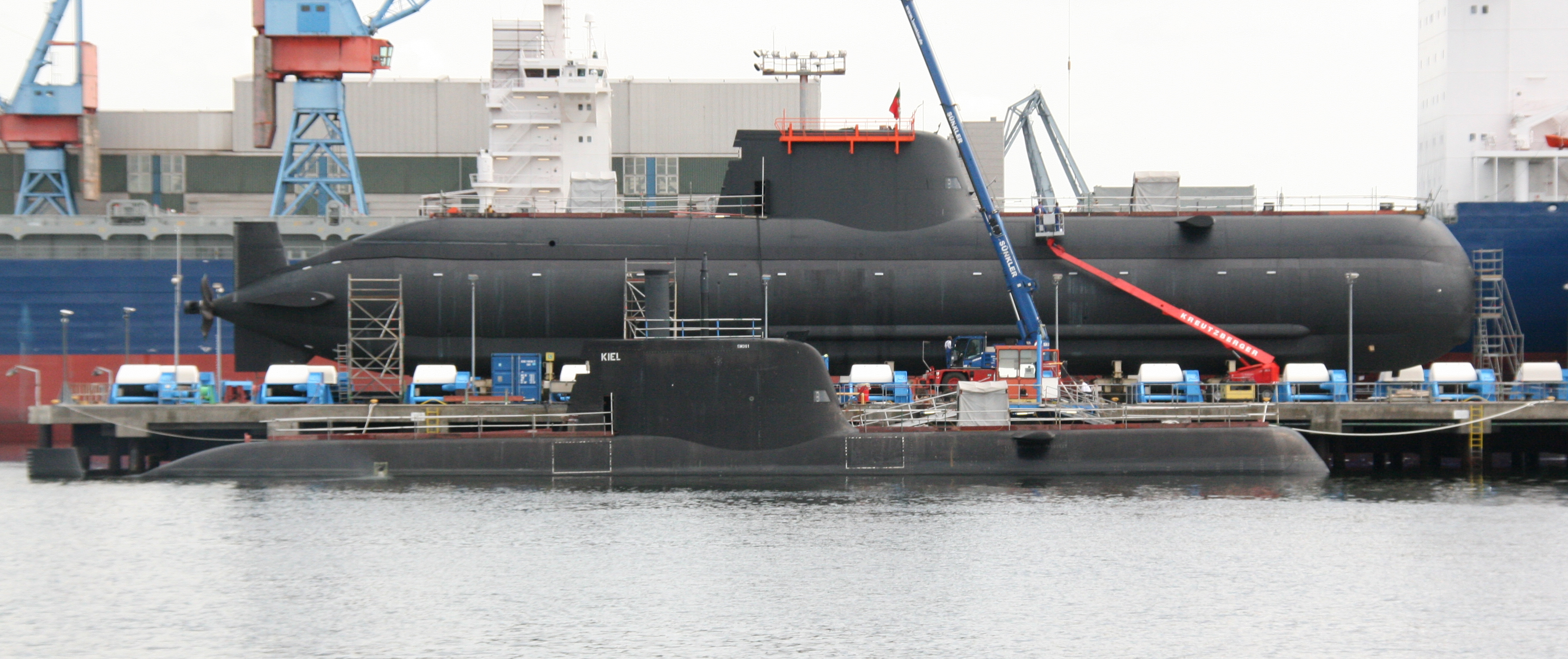
NRP Tridente at Howaldtswerke-Deutsche Werft at Kiel shipyard

== See also ==
- List of submarine classes in service

Equivalent submarines of the same era

- Dolphin class
- Scorpène class
- Heroine class
- Type 212A
- Nagapasa class
