= NRP Arpão =

Submarine of the Portuguese Navy

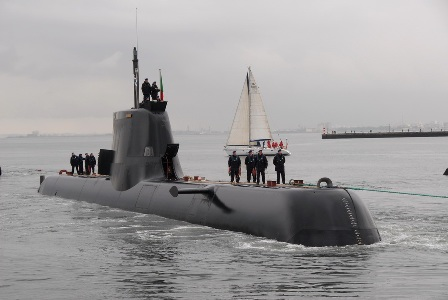
- NRP Arpão in the Lisbon Naval Base

History

Portugal
- Name: NRP Arpão
- Builder: HDW
- Laid down: 2005
- Commissioned: 22 December 2010
- Status: In active service

General characteristics
- Class & type: Tridente class submarine
- Displacement: 1,700 tons (surfaced); 2,020 tons (submerged)
- Length: 67.7 m (222 ft)
- Beam: 6.35 m (21 ft)
- Draught: 6.6 m (22 ft)
- Propulsion: 2 generators AIP Siemens Sinavy (BZM-120); 240 KW; 2 diesel engines MTU 16V396 TB-94; 6,24 MW; 1 electric engine Siemens Permasyn; 2,85 MW; 1 axis
- Speed: 20 knots (37 km/h) submerged; 10 knots (19 km/h) surfaced; 6 knots (11 km/h) AIP system
- Range: 12,000 nautical miles (22,000 km) at 8 knots (15 km/h)
- Endurance: 60 days
- Test depth: superior to 300 m (984 ft)
- Capacity: 14 marines
- Complement: 33 men: 7 officers; 10 sergeants; 16 sailors
- Sensors & processing systems: Kelvin Hughes KH-1007 (F) navigation radar; Atlas Elektronik GmbH ISUS 90 combat management system
- Armament: 8 × 533 mm torpedo tubes; 12 × Alenia Marconi Systems IF-21 Blackshark torpedo reloads; 6 × Sub-Harpoon UGM 84 capable

NRP Arpão (S161) is a Tridente-class attack submarine of the Portuguese Navy. It was commissioned in 2010.

== Operational history ==
In April 2023, the submarine deployed to the South Atlantic, crossing the Equator for the first time. During her deployment, she visited Cape Verde, Brazil, South Africa, Angola, and Morocco, reportedly making it the longest ever Portuguese submarine deployment. In October 2023, the submarine was deployed to the Mediterranean to operate with NATO naval forces as part of "Operation Sea Guardian". Between April 2024 and June 2024 NRP Arpao was again deployed with NATO naval forces, this time as part of "Operation Brilliant Shield", and became the first Portuguese submarine to navigate below Arctic ice.
