= NRP Tridente =

Submarine of the Portuguese Navy

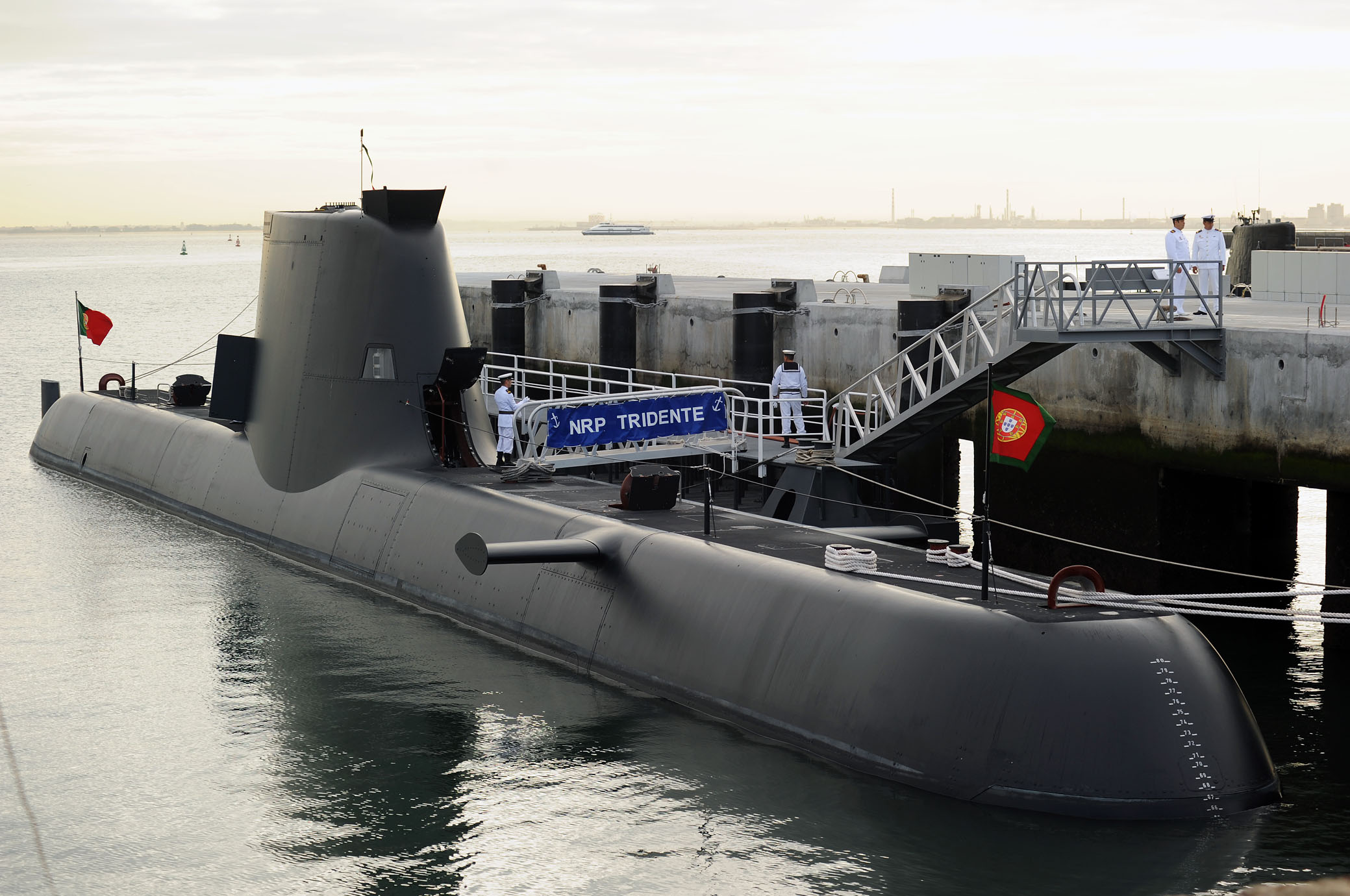
- NRP Tridente in the Lisbon Naval Base

History

Portugal
- Name: NRP Tridente
- Builder: HDW
- Laid down: 2005
- Commissioned: 2010
- Status: In active service

General characteristics
- Class & type: Tridente-class submarine
- Displacement: 1,700 tons (surfaced); 2,020 tons (submerged)
- Length: 67.7 m (222 ft 1 in)
- Beam: 6.35 m (20 ft 10 in)
- Draught: 6.6 m (21 ft 8 in)
- Propulsion: 2 generators AIP Siemens Sinavy (BZM-120); 240 KW; 2 diesel engines MTU 16V396 TB-94; 6,24 MW; 1 electric engine Siemens Permasyn; 2.85 MW; 1 axis
- Speed: 20 kn (37 km/h; 23 mph) submerged; 10 kn (19 km/h; 12 mph) surfaced; 6 kn (11 km/h; 6.9 mph) AIP system
- Range: 12,000 nmi (22,000 km; 14,000 mi) at 8 kn (15 km/h; 9.2 mph)
- Endurance: 60 days
- Test depth: superior to 300 m (980 ft)
- Capacity: 14 marines
- Complement: 33
- Sensors & processing systems: Kelvin Hughes KH-1007 (F) navigation radar; Atlas Elektronik GmbH ISUS 90 combat management system
- Armament: 8 × 533 mm torpedo tubes; 12 × Alenia Marconi Systems IF-21 Blackshark torpedo reloads; 6 × Sub-Harpoon UGM 84 capable

NRP Tridente (S160) is a Tridente-class submarine of the Portuguese Navy.

== Daytona incident ==
In July 2016, Tridente became entangled in the fishing nets of the French trawler Daytona. Neither the submarine nor the trawler were damaged.
