= List of colonial and provincial heads of Cabinda =

This is a list of colonial and provincial heads of Cabinda. The Cabinda Province, an exclave of present-day Angola, was once colonized by the Portuguese Empire along with the rest of Angola, until the nation became independent in 1975. The province has had a head since 1885.

== List of Colonial and Provincial Heads of Cabinda ==
The colonial head of Cabinda was known as the Resident from 1885 to 1899. Beginning in 1899, the colonial (and later, provincial) head administrator has been known as a Governor (Portuguese: Governador(a)).

Tenure	Incumbent	Notes
Portuguese Protectorate of Cabinda
1885 to 1886	Jaime Pereira de Sampaio Forjaz de Serpa Pimentel, Resident	
31 May 1887	Cabinda becomes seat of the Congo district	
1890 to 1892	José António de Miranda, Resident	Did not take office
1892 to 1897	João Francisco Nunes, Resident	
1897 to 1897	Luís Gonzaga Ribeiro, Resident	
1899	End of Cabindan administrative autonomy	
1899 to 1899	Henrique Quirino da Fonseca, Resident	
Congo District (Governors)
14 July 1887 to 1889	João de Brissac das Neves Ferreira, Governor	
1889 to 1890	António de Azeredo de Vasconcelos, Governor	
1890 to 1893	António Sérgio de Sousa, Governor	
1893 to 1895	Nuno de Freitas Queriol, Governor	1st Term
1895 to 1896	Jaime Pereira de Sampaio Forjaz de Serpa Pimenta, Governor	
1895 to 1896	Eduardo Augusto Gomes de Sousa, Governor	?1st Term
1896 to 1897	Nuno de Freitas Queriol, Governor	2nd Term
1897 to 1897	Eduardo Augusto Gomes de Sousa, Governor	?2nd Term
1897 to 1899	Luís Bernardino Leitão Xavier, Governor	
1899 to 1900	Henrique Quirino da Fonseca, Governor	
1900 to 1900	Augusto Pereira do Vale, Governor	
1900 to 1901	Jaime da Fonseca Monteiro, Governor	
1901 to 1901	Pedro de Azevedo Coutinho, Governor	
1901 to 1901	Raúl Correia Betancourt de Furtado, Governor	
1901 to 1902	João dos Santos Pereira Jardim, Governor	
Intendancy of Cabinda	Under Maquela	
1921 to 1922		
1922	Dependent on Zaire district	
Intendancy of Zaire and Cabinda
1930 to 1932		
Intendancy of Cabinda	Directly dependent on the governor-general of Angola	
1932 to 1934		
Intendancy of Cabinda
1934	Dependent on Portuguese Angola	
1934 to 1945		
District of Cabinda (Governors)
1946 to 1949	Raúl de Lima, Governor	
1949 to 1956	Ismael Pais, Governor	
1956 to 1956	João Baptista Duarte Pinheiro, Governor	
1956 to 1957	Jaime António Tavares Machado Banazol, Governor	
1957 to 1958	Norberto Augusto Lopes, Governor	
1959 to 1961	José Paulo Paixão Barradas, Governor	
1961 to 1963	Júlio de Araújo Ferreiro, Governor	
1964 to 1965	Artur João Cabral Carmona, Governor	
1965 to 1966	Adriano Augusto Pires, Governor	
1966 to 1968	João Tiroa, Governor	
1968 to 1970	Américo Agostinho Mendonça Frazão, Governor	
1970 to 1971	Eurico Ferreira Gonçalves, Governor	
1971 to 1975	João António Pinheiro, Governor	
1975 to 1975	Themudo Barata, Governor	
November 1975 to January 1976	FNLA control as part of Democratic People's Republic of Angola	
1 August 1975	Independence declared (Cabinda Republic) not recognized by Portugal or Angola	
January 1976	Cabinda occupied by Angolan government	
Cabinda Province (Governors)
1975 to ?1993	...	
1991 to 1991	Maria Mambo Café	
September 1992	Briefly occupied by Frente para a Libertação do Enclave de Cabinda	
?1993 to January 1995	Augusto Tomás	
January 1995 to April 2002	José Amaro Tati	
2002 to 2009	José Anibal Lopes Rochas	
2009 to 2012	Mawete João Baptista	
2012 to 2017	Aldina Matilde Barros da Lomba	
2017 to ???	???	
??? to 2024	Mara Baptista Quiosa	
2024 to present	Suzana Fernanda Pemba Massiala de Abreu	

== See also ==
- Cabinda
  - Heads of state of Cabinda
  - Heads of government of Cabinda
- Angola
  - Heads of state of Angola
  - Heads of government of Angola
  - President of Angola
  - Prime Minister of Angola
  - Colonial heads of Angola
- Lists of office-holders
