= Guilhermina Prata =

Angolan lawyer, politician and diplomat (born 1952)

Extraordinary and Plenipotentiary Ambassador of the Republic of Angola to France, Liechtenstein, Monaco and Switzerland
- Incumbent
- Assumed office January 2023
- President: João Lourenço
- Vice President: Esperança da Costa
- Preceded by: João Bernardo de Miranda

Ministry of Justice
- In office 2008–2012
- President: José Eduardo dos Santos
- Vice President: Fernando da Piedade Dias dos Santos
- Preceded by: Manuel Miguel da Costa Aragão
- Succeeded by: Rui Jorge Carneiro Mangueira

Member of the Angolan National Assembly
- Incumbent
- Assumed office 1992
- President: José Eduardo dos Santos

Personal details
- Born: 8 May 1952 (age 74) Luanda, Angola
- Party: People's Movement for the Liberation of Angola (MPLA)
- Education: Agostinho Neto University; University of Coimbra

Guilhermina Contreiras da Costa Prata (born 8 May 1952) is an Angolan lawyer, politician and diplomat. She was a Member of the Angolan National Assembly, Minister of Justice and Vice-president of the Constitutional Court. Since 2023, she serves as Extraordinary and Plenipotentiary Ambassador of the Republic of Angola to France, Liechtenstein, Monaco and Switzerland.

== Biography ==
Prata was born on 8 May 1952 in Luanda, Angola. She studied a degree in law at Agostinho Neto University, Luanda, Angola. She then studied a master's in law and business sciences at her alma mater in collaboration with the Faculty of Law of the University of Coimbra, Coimbra, Portugal.

In 1985, Prata began her legal career at the Office of Legal Affairs. At the 1992 Angolan general election, Prata was elected as a member of the Angolan National Assembly. From 1993 to 1999 she was Secretary of the Parliamentary Group of the MPLA. From 1996 to 2004 she was Legal Advisor of the Parliamentary Group of the MPLA.

Prata was a member of the "Working Group to Enhance Women's Representation and Promote the Consideration of Gender Issues Within Parliaments in Southern Africa" in 1996.

In 2004, Prata was appointed Vice-Minister of Justice. In 2005, she announced that a new Penal Code Bill has been finalised and was ready for discussion within the Justice and Law Reform Commission. In 2006, she pushed for legal measures to be taken about drug use in Angola and attended the session of Ministers of Justice and Emigration of the Economic Community of Central African States (CEEAC).

Prata was promoted to Minister of Justice in September 2008 and was in office until 2012. In June 2009, she attended events to promote children's rights for International Children's Day and in 2010 she promoted learning of the Portuguese language to strengthen new juridical systems in Angola. In 2011, Prata announced the creation of the office of Court Secretary to improve the timeliness of the handling of administrative and financial matters. In 2012, she praised the adoption of the Law on Domestic Violence in Angola.

In November 2017, Prata was appointed as Judge Counsellor and Vice-president of the Constitutional Court of Angola. In November 2022, Prata retired from the Constitutional Court.

In January 2023, Prata was appointed as Extraordinary and Plenipotentiary Ambassador of the Republic of Angola to France by the president of Angola, João Lourenço. She succeeded João Bernardo de Miranda as Ambassador. By 2024, she was also accredited as Ambassador to Liechtenstein, Monaco and Switzerland.

Prata is a member of the Angolan Bar Association, the Association of Angolan Jurists and the International Federation of Women in the Legal Career (FIFCJ).
