= List of heads of state of Cabinda =

This is a list of heads of state of Cabinda.

A short-lived secessionist regime in the Cabinda enclave of Angola.

Republic of Cabinda in Exile (not recognised by Portugal or Angola)
Name	Term of office	Affiliation	Notes
Pedro Simba Macosso, President	10 January 1967 to 1 August 1975	FLEC	In exile
Henrique N'zita Tiago, Provisional President	1975 to 1975	FLEC-N	
Luis Ranque Franque, Provisional President	1 August 1975 to August 1975	FLEC	
Luis Ranque Franque, President de facto	August 1975 to January 1976	FLEC	In exile in the Democratic Republic of Congo from 1976
In January 1976, Cabinda was occupied by Angolan Government

Note: The current president of the Republic of Cabinda in exile is General of Army Antonio Luis Lopes

== Affiliations ==
FLEC	Frente para a Libertação do Enclave de Cabinda
FLEC	(Front for the Liberation of the Enclave of Cabinda Cabinda regionalist, separatist, estd. 1963
FLEC-L	FLEC-Lubota
FLEC-L	(FLEC faction) Francisco Xavier Lubota, personalist, estd. 1975
FLEC-N	FLEC-N'Zita
FLEC-N	(FLEC faction) Henrique N'zita Tiago, personalist, estd. 1975
FLEK-K	FLEK-Batila
FLEK-K	(FLEC faction) Joel Batila, Premier, estd. 2011
FLEC	FLEC
FLEC	(FLEC) Antonio Luis Lopes, President

== Sources ==
- https://web.archive.org/web/20120411232707/http://www.cabindanation.net/
- http://www.rulers.org/rula1.html#algeria
- Article title^{[usurped]}
- http://www.globalsecurity.org/military/world/para/flec.htm
- Heads of State and Government, 2nd Edition, John V da Graca, MacMillan Press 2000

== See also ==
- Angola
  - Heads of government of Cabinda
  - Heads of state of Angola
  - Heads of government of Angola
  - Prime Minister of Angola
  - President of Angola
  - Colonial heads of Angola
- Lists of office-holders
  - List of colonial and provincial heads of Cabinda
