= List of heads of government of Cabinda =

List of heads of government of Cabinda (Angola)

(Dates in italics indicate de facto continuation of office)

Tenure	Incumbent	Affiliation	Notes
July 1975 to 1 August 1975	Francisco Xavier Lubota, Provisional Prime Minister	FLEC-L	
1 August 1975 to January 1976	Francisco Xavier Lubota, Prime Minister	FLEC-L	In exile in Congo Kinshasa from November 1975

== Affiliations ==
FLEC	Frente para a Libertação do Enclave de Cabinda
FLEC	Front for the Liberation of the Enclave of Cabinda Cabinda regionalist, separatist, estd. 1963
FLEC-L	FLEC-Lubota
FLEC-L	(FLEC faction) Francisco Xavier Lubota personalist, estd.1975
FLEC-N	FLEC-N'Zita
FLEC-N	(FLEC faction) Henrique N'zita Tiago personalist, estd.1975

== See also ==
- Angola
  - Heads of state of Cabinda
  - List of colonial and provincial heads of Cabinda
  - Heads of state of Angola
  - Heads of government of Angola
  - Prime Minister of Angola
  - President of Angola
  - Colonial heads of Angola
- Lists of office-holders
