= Marcolino Moco =

Prime Minister of Angola

1st Executive Secretary of the Lusophone Commonwealth
- In office 17 July 1996 – July 2000
- Succeeded by: Dulce Pereira

3rd Prime Minister of Angola
- In office December 2, 1992 – June 3, 1996
- President: José Eduardo dos Santos
- Preceded by: Fernando José de França Dias Van-Dúnem
- Succeeded by: Fernando José de França Dias Van-Dúnem

Provincial Commissioner of Bié
- In office 1986–1987
- Preceded by: João Marques Bassovava
- Succeeded by: Luís Paulino dos Santos

Provincial Commissioner of Huambo
- In office 1987–1989
- Preceded by: João Marques Bassovava
- Succeeded by: Osvaldo Serra Van-Dúnem

Minister of Youth and Sports
- In office 1989–1992
- Preceded by: Position established
- Succeeded by: Osvaldo Serra Van-Dúnem

Personal details
- Born: Marcolino José Carlos Moco; June 19, 1953 (age 72) Chitue, Ekunha, Overseas Province of Angola

Marcolino José Carlos Moco (born June 19, 1953 in Chitue, Ekunha) is an Angolan politician. He was the 3rd Prime Minister of Angola from December 2, 1992, until June 3, 1996. He served as the first Executive Secretary of the Community of Portuguese Language Countries, also known as the Lusophone Commonwealth.

== Career ==
Moco was fired from his role by President José Eduardo dos Santos. Santos removed the entire cabinet alongside the Governor of the central bank in a bid to be seen as decisive. Moco was a member of the People's Movement for the Liberation of Angola (MPLA), the party of the President, which had been the ruling party until 1991, shortly before Moco became Prime Minister (with an interlude by a government of national unity, after which the MPLA again became the ruling party until the present).

=== CPLP ===
In July 1996, Moco became the first Executive Secretary of the Community of Portuguese Language Countries, a new international organization which Portugal and most of its former colonies, including Angola, joined. Moco's term as Executive Secretary ended in 2000.

== Personal life ==
Moco's eldest son is Chilala Moco, a photographer based in Angola and Portugal.

Political offices
Preceded by Fernando José de França Dias Van-Dúnem	Prime Minister of Angola; 1992-1996	Succeeded by Fernando José de França Dias Van-Dúnem
Preceded by Position created	Executive Secretary of the CPLP; 1996–2000	Succeeded by Dulce Maria Pereira
