= João Maria de Sousa =

Attorney-General of the Angolan Armed Forces

Attorney General of Angola
- In office 2007–2017
- Preceded by: Augusto da Costa Carneiro
- Succeeded by: Hélder Fernando Pitta Grós

Personal details
- Born: Luanda, Angola
- Party: MPLA

General João Maria Moreira de Sousa (born 1951) is a former Attorney General of Angola, "the top magistrate of the Prosecuting Council". In a December 2007 ceremony reconfirming his post (which has been held since at least 2004) and attended by members of the press, de Sousa was photographed being sworn into office by José Eduardo dos Santos, President, Head of Government, and Commander-in-Chief of the Armed Forces of Angola.

== Military background ==
General de Sousa is, along with fellow "top generals" Higino Carneiro, Hélder Vieira Dias, Roberto Leal Monteiro, and Kundi Paihama, one of the military leaders holding top ministerial posts for the Popular Movement for the Liberation of Angola, the political party that has ruled Angola since it gained its independence from Portugal in 1975.

== Statements ==
- In 2004, de Sousa stated that Angola's National Police should act against criminals rather than to quell dissent.
- In late 2007, de Sousa expressed satisfaction that the year was drawing to and end without an excess of people held in protective custody in Angola. He revisited this topic publicly in March 2008 when he blamed a shortage of magistrates and judges for the excess of preventive custody cases in Angola stating that the number of cases presented daily "is too high and the number of judges and attorneys existing is insufficient for us to deal with all cases in time". The Attorney General refused to reveal the number of prisoners to whom this situation applies, but said that efforts were being made to engage more qualified magistrates with the provincial courts. He added that only through the training of more magistrates would the problem be resolved.
- In a January 2008 interview with Rádio Nacional de Angola, de Sousa said the detention of journalist Fernando Lelo was justified based on "strong signs of crime against the State security". He denied that there were any "irregularities in his detention" and said that Lelo's offenses included the incitement of Angolan Armed Forces soldiers to commit crimes.
- In another early 2008 interview, when speaking on the issue of whether or not Nigerian militant Henry Okah (also known by the alias Jomo Gbomo and believed to be a spokesperson for the Movement for the Emancipation of Niger Delta) would be extradited, de Sousa said "Terrorism is an issue that worries all countries. And in due time we're going announce (our decision)". Okah was deported from Angola the following month and now faces the death penalty.
- En route to attending the Johannesburg, South Africa meeting of the Executive Committee of Attorneys' Association of Africa in February 2008, de Sousa addressed reporters at the international airport in Luanda to describes subjects on that meeting's agenda including children's rights, domestic violence, human trafficking, and organised crime.

== Name ==
General de Sousa should not be confused with João Maria de Sousa e Almeida, Baron de Agua-Izé, a Portuguese nobleman credited with bringing the seeds of the breadfruit tree to São Tomé in 1858.
