= Osvaldo de Jesus Serra Van-Dúnem =

Angolan politician (1950–2006)

Provincial Commissioner of Huambo
- In office 1989–1992
- Preceded by: Marcolino Moco
- Succeeded by: Graciano Mande

Minister of Youth and Sports
- In office 1992–1992
- Preceded by: Marcolino Moco
- Succeeded by: Justino Fernandes

Chief of the Military Staff of the President
- In office 1992–1995
- Preceded by: Position established
- Succeeded by: Hélder Vieira Dias

Ambassador of Angola to Brazil
- In office 1995–1999
- Preceded by: Manuel Alfredo Salvaterra
- Succeeded by: Gen. Alberto Correia Neto

Ambassador of Angola to Portugal
- In office 1999–2002
- Preceded by: José G.M. Patrício
- Succeeded by: Assunção dos Anjos

Minister of the Interior
- In office 2002–2006
- Preceded by: Fernando da Piedade Nandó
- Succeeded by: Roberto Monteiro Ngongo

Personal details
- Born: August 8, 1950 Luanda, Angola
- Died: 4 February 2006 (aged 55) São Paulo, Brazil
- Party: MPLA

Osvaldo de Jesus Serra Van-Dúnem (8 August 1950 – 4 February 2006) was an Angolan politician and diplomat. His surname is of Flemish origin, from the well known Angolan Family, "the Van-Dúnem family". He was appointed Interior Minister on 16 December 2002 by Prime Minister Fernando da Piedade Dias dos Santos.

From 1999 to 2002, he was the ambassador of Angola to Portugal. He left this post to become the minister. In May 2006, Van-Dúnem died while visiting Brazil.
