= Santana André Pitra =

Angolan politician

Advisor to the President of Angola
- Incumbent
- Assumed office 1999

Provincial Commissioner of Huambo
- In office 1979–1982
- Preceded by: Pedro Maria Tonha
- Succeeded by: João Ernesto dos Santos

Minister of the Interior
- In office 1992–1997
- Preceded by: F. Magalhães Paiva Nvunda
- Succeeded by: Fernando da P.D. dos Santos

Personal details
- Party: MPLA

Santana André Pitra was the Angolan minister for the interior in the 1994 government of Jose Eduardo dos Santos.

In 1976 he founded the football club G.D. Interclube.
