= Paulo Tchipilica =

Angolan politician (1939–2025)

Paulo Tchipilica (21 December 1939 – 15 September 2025) was an Angolan politician.

== Life and career ==
Tchipilica served as the minister of justice (1992–2004), under President José Eduardo dos Santos.

Tchipilica died on 15 September 2025, at the age of 85.
