= Ndele =

Ndele, Ndélé or N'Délé may refer to:

== Places ==
- N'Délé, Central African Republic
- Ndélé (Centre), Centre Region (Cameroon)
- Ndélé (South), South Region (Cameroon)

== People ==
- Albert Ndele (born 1930), Congolese politician
- José Ndele (1940–2000), Prime Minister of Democratic People's Republic of Angola
