= Fernando José =

Fernando Jose is a masculine given name. Notable people with the name include:

- Fernando José de França Dias Van-Dúnem (born 1934), Angolan politician
- Fernando José Torres Sanz, Fernando Torres
- Fernando José (actor), Brazilian actor
