= Chilala Moco =

Angolan photographer (born 1977)

- Born: 1977 (age 48–49); Caála, Angola
- Occupation: Photographer

Chilala Moco (born 8 May 1977 in Caála, Huambo Province) is an Angolan photographer and the oldest son of former Angolan Prime Minister Marcolino Moco.

== Biography ==
In 1995 he moved to Portugal, where he lived and studied International Relations, at the Instituto Superior de Ciências Sociais e Políticas (ISCSP). At the end of the third year, Chilala chose instead to study photography. In 2003 he enrolled in photography studies, at Escola Técnica de Imagem e Comunicação (ETIC).

Based in Luanda, Angola, Chilala Moco worked for five years as freelancer photographer, collaborating with magazines such as glamorous Caras Angola. Some of his art work was shown at Trienal de Luanda 2006, and bought by some Angolan collectors. His photographs have been published in some prestigious books related to Angola. Chilala Moco signs his assignment photographs as Carlos Moco, apart from his artistic work.

Moco is now a full-time photography editor for the Angolan newspaper O PAIS, as well as for its associate publications at Grupo Medianova.

In 2009 Moco won the Angolan national award of photojournalism, and was also nominated for a corporate award (Maboque Awards on Journalism) on the same category.

Alongside selected Angolan artists, Chilala Moco was invited by Fundação Sindika Dokolo, an African art foundation, to present his artistic work at Bienal de Bordeaux, France (Evento 2009).

He participated in the jury for the photography context BESA Photo 2009, organized by the World Press Photo and Banco BESA (an Angolan/Portuguese financial institution).
