= List of ambassadors of Russia to Angola =

Ambassador of the Russian Federation to the Republic of Angola
- Emblem of the Russian Foreign Ministry
- Incumbent; Vacant
- Ministry of Foreign Affairs; Embassy of Russia in Luanda
- Style: His Excellency; The Honourable
- Reports to: Minister of Foreign Affairs
- Seat: Luanda
- Appointer: President of Russia
- Term length: At the pleasure of the president
- Formation: 1976
- First holder: Boris Vorobyov
- Website: Embassy of Russia in Angola

The ambassador extraordinary and plenipotentiary of the Russian Federation to the Republic of Angola is the official representative of the president and the government of the Russian Federation to the president and the government of Angola.

The ambassador and his staff work at large in the Embassy of Russia in Luanda. The post of Russian ambassador to Angola is currently vacant, following the recall of Vladimir Tararov, on 18 August 2025. Since 1992 the ambassador to Angola has had dual accreditation as the non-resident ambassador to São Tomé and Príncipe.

== History of diplomatic relations ==
Diplomatic relations at the mission level between the Soviet Union and Angola were first established in November 1975. The first ambassador, Boris Vorobyov, was appointed on 3 March 1976, and presented his credentials on 16 April 1976. With the dissolution of the Soviet Union in 1991, the Soviet ambassador, Yury Kapralov, continued as representative of the Russian Federation until 1995.

== List of representatives (1976–present) ==
=== Soviet Union to Angola (1976–1991) ===
Name	Title	Appointment	Termination	Notes
Boris Vorobyov	Ambassador	3 March 1976	17 March 1978	
Vadim Loginov	Ambassador	17 March 1978	16 December 1983	
Arnold Kalinin	Ambassador	16 December 1983	3 September 1987	
Yury Kapralov	Ambassador	10 October 1990	25 December 1991	

=== Russian Federation to Angola (1991–present) ===
Name	Title	Appointment	Termination	Notes
Yury Kapralov	Ambassador	25 December 1991	26 June 1995	
Vladimir Rayevsky	Ambassador	26 June 1995	17 December 1999	
Sergey Andreyev	Ambassador	21 December 1999	14 August 2002	
Andrey Kemarsky	Ambassador	14 August 2002	14 September 2007	
Sergey Nenashev	Ambassador	14 September 2007	19 October 2012	
Dmitry Lobach	Ambassador	19 October 2012	23 May 2017	
Vladimir Tararov	Ambassador	23 May 2017	18 August 2025	
Aleksandr Bryantsev	Temporary Chargé d'affaires	18 August 2025		
