= Angola–Soviet Union relations =

Angolan – Soviet relations

- Angola: Soviet Union

Soviet–Angolan relations were close until the Angolan government renounced Marxist-Leninism in 1990 and adopted a pro-Western foreign policy. The close, personal relationship between President Agostinho Neto and Cuban leader Fidel Castro complicated the Soviet Union's involvement in the Angolan Civil War and foiled several assassination attempts against Neto.

== Angolan War of Independence ==
As the Portuguese presence in provincial Angola dwindled, the Popular Movement for the Liberation of Angola (MPLA), supported by the Soviet Union and the Eastern Bloc, fought against the National Liberation Front of Angola (FNLA), an organization based in the Bakongo region of the north and allied with the United States, the People's Republic of China and the Mobutu government in Zaïre. The United States, South Africa, and several other African nations also supported Jonas Savimbi's National Union for the Total Independence of Angola (UNITA), whose ethnic and regional base lies in the Ovimbundu heartland of central Angola.

== 1970s ==
The government of the Soviet Union, well aware of the SADFs activity in southern Angola, one week before November 11, 1975, the date on which Angolan nationalists had agreed to declare independence. While Cuban officers led the mission and provided the bulk of the troop force, the Soviet leadership expressly forbid the Cubans from intervening in Angola's civil war, focusing the mission on containing South Africa.

Cuba had a close eye on the development. Neto had asked the Soviet Union for support but the Russians did not have in mind to intervene before the elections. In contrast, Cuba was ready to help, as explained by Fidel Castro: "When the invasion of Angola by regular SADF troops started 23 October, we could not sit idle. And when the MPLA asked us for help, be offered the necessary aid to prevent Apartheid from making itself comfortable in Angola."

The deployment of these troops had not been arranged with the USSR, as often reported and depicted by the US administration. On the contrary, this took the USSR by surprise.

The Russians had to go along as under no circumstances did they want to endanger relations with their most important outpost in close proximity to the US, but tried to keep a lid on the extent of the Cuban giant military presence in Angola. It was only after two months that Moscow agreed to arrange for a maximum of 10 transport flights from Cuba to Angola. Of course the US assumed that the USSR was behind the Cuban interference. Only years later it became clear to them, that the Cubans acted on their own behalf as admitted by Ronald Reagan that "The excessive illegal Cuban military operations in Angola was a Fidel Castro project that Moscow was hesitant to support". Due to the hostility between the US and Cuba, the Americans regarded such an interference by the Cubans as unacceptable.

== Shaba invasions ==
Shaba Province, Zaire

1,500 members of the Front for the National Liberation of the Congo (FNLC) invaded Shaba, Zaire, from eastern Angola on March 7, 1977. The FNLC wanted to overthrow Mobutu and the Angolan government, suffering from Mobutu's support for the FNLA and UNITA, did not try to stop the invasion. The FNLC failed to capture Kolwezi, Zaire's economic heartland, but took Kasaji, and Mutshatsha. Zairian troops were defeated without difficulty and the FNLC continued to advance. Mobutu appealed to William Eteki of Cameroon, chairman of the Organization of African Unity, for assistance on April 2. Eight days later, the French government responded to Mobutu's plea and airlifted 1,500 Moroccan troops into Kinshasa. This troop force worked in conjunction with the Zairian army and the FNLA of Angola with air cover from Egyptian pilots flying French Mirage fighter aircraft to beat back the FNLC. The counter-invasion force pushed the last of the militants, along with a number of refugees, into Angola and Zambia in April.

Mobutu accused the Angolan, Cuban and Soviet governments of complicity in the war. While Neto did support the FNLC, the Angolan government's support came in response to Mobutu's continued support for Angola's anti-communists. John Stockwell, the Central Intelligence Agency's station chief in Angola, resigned after the invasion, explaining in an article for The Washington Post article "Why I'm Leaving the CIA", published on April 10, 1977, that he had warned Secretary of State Henry Kissinger that continued American support for anti-government rebels in Angola could provoke a war with Zaire. He also said covert Soviet involvement in Angola came after, and in response to, US involvement.

== Nitista revolt ==
Neto's interior minister, Nito Alves, had successfully put down Daniel Chipenda's Eastern Revolt and the Active Revolt during Angola's War of Independence. Factionalism within the MPLA became a major challenge to Neto's power by late 1975 and he gave Alves the task of once again clamping down on dissension. Alves shut down the Cabral and Henda committees while expanding his influence within the MPLA through his control of the nation's newspapers and state-run television. Alves visited the Soviet Union in October 1976. When he returned, Neto began taking steps to neutralize the threat he saw in the Nitistas, followers of Alves. Ten armored cars with the FAPLA's 8th Brigade broke into São Paulo prison at 4 a.m. on May 27, killing the prison warden and freeing more than 150 supporters, including 11 who had been arrested only a few days before.

The government arrested tens of thousands of suspected Nitistas from May to November and tried them in secret courts overseen by Defense Minister Iko Carreira. Those who were found guilty, including Van-Dunem, Jacobo "Immortal Monster" Caetano, the head of the 8th Brigade, and political commissar Eduardo Evaristo, were then shot and buried in secret graves. The coup attempt had a lasting effect on Angola's foreign relations. Alves had opposed Neto's foreign policy of non-alignment, evolutionary socialism, and multiracialism, favoring stronger relations with the Soviet Union, which he wanted to grant military bases in Angola. While Cuban soldiers actively helped Neto put down the coup, Alves and Neto both believed the Soviet Union supported Neto's ouster. Raúl Castro sent an additional four thousand troops to prevent further dissension within the MPLA's ranks and met with Neto in August in a display of solidarity. In contrast, Neto's distrust in the Soviet leadership increased and relations with the USSR worsened. In December, the MPLA held is first party congress and changed its name to the MPLA-PT. The Nitista coup took a toll on the MPLA's membership. In 1975, the MPLA boasted of 200,000 members. After the first party congress, that number decreased to 30,000.

== Operation IA Feature ==
Two days prior to the US government's approval of Operation IA Feature, Nathaniel Davis, the assistant secretary of State, told Henry Kissinger, the United States secretary of state, that he believed maintaining the secrecy of IA Feature would be impossible. Davis correctly predicted the Soviet Union would respond by increasing involvement in the Angolan conflict, leading to more violence and negative publicity for the United States. When Ford approved the program, Davis resigned.

== Vietnam ==
The Vietnam War tempered foreign involvement in Angola's civil war as neither the Soviet Union nor the United States wanted to be drawn into an internal conflict of highly debatable importance in terms of winning the Cold War. CBS newscaster Walter Cronkite spread this message in his broadcasts to "try to play our small part in preventing that mistake this time." The Politburo engaged in heated debate over the extent to which the Soviet Union would support a continued offensive by the MPLA in February 1976. Foreign Minister Andrei Gromyko and Premier Alexei Kosygin led a faction favoring less support for the MPLA and greater emphasis on preserving détente with the West. Leonid Brezhnev, the then head of the Soviet Union, won out against the dissident faction and the Soviet alliance with the MPLA continued even as Neto publicly reaffirmed its policy of non-alignment at the 15th anniversary of the First Revolt.

== Rise of dos Santos ==
The Soviets, trying to increase their influence in Luanda, began sending busts of Vladimir Lenin, a plane full of brochures with Brezhnev's speech at the February 1976 Party Congress, and two planes full of pamphlets denouncing Mao Zedong, to Angola. They sent so many busts that they ran out in the summer of 1976 and requested more from the CPSU Propaganda Department. Despite the best efforts of the Soviet propaganda machine and persistent lobbying by G. A. Zverev, the Soviet chargé d'affaires, Neto stood his ground, refusing to grant the permanent military bases the Soviets so desperately wanted in Angola. Neto allies like Defense Minister Iko Carreira and MPLA General Secretary Lúcio Lara also irked the Soviet leadership through both for their policies and personalities. With Alves out of the picture, the Soviet Union promoted Prime Minister Lopo do Nascimento, another "internationalist", against Neto, a "careerist", for the MPLA's leadership. Neto moved swiftly to crush his adversary. The MPLA-PT's Central Committee met from December 6 to 9. The committee concluded the meeting by firing Nascimento as both prime minister and as secretary of the politburo, the director of National Television, and the director of Jornal de Angola. Commander C. R. Dilolua resigned as second deputy prime minister and a member of the politburo. Later that month the committee abolished the positions of prime minister and deputy prime minister. Paving the way for dos Santos, Neto increased the ethnic composition of the MPLA-PT's political bureau as he replaced the hardline old guard with new blood.

== 1980s ==
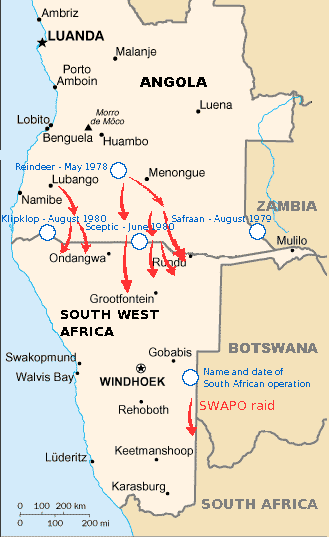
SWAPO's and South Africa's operations (1978–1980)

In the 1980s, fighting spread outward from southeastern Angola, where most of the fighting had taken place in the 1970s, as the National Congolese Army (ANC) and the South West Africa People's Organization (SWAPO) increased their activity. The South African government responded by sending troops back into Angola, intervening in the war from 1981 to 1987, prompting the Soviet Union to deliver massive amounts of military aid from 1981 to 1986. In 1981, newly elected United States President Ronald Reagan's US assistant secretary of state for African affairs, Chester Crocker, developed a linkage policy, tying Namibian independence to Cuban withdrawal and peace in Angola.

== Democratic International ==
On June 2, 1985, American conservative activists held the Democratic International, a symbolic meeting of anti-communist militants, at UNITA's headquarters in Jamba, Angola. Primarily funded by Rite Aid founder Lewis Lehrman and organized by anti-communist activists Jack Abramoff and Jack Wheeler, participants included Savimbi, Adolfo Calero, leader of the Nicaraguan Contras, Pa Kao Her, Hmong Laotian rebel leader, US Lieutenant Colonel Oliver North, South African security forces, Abdurrahim Wardak, Afghan Mujahideen leader, Jack Wheeler, American conservative policy advocate, and many others. While the Reagan administration, though unwilling to publicly support the meeting, privately expressed approval. The governments of Israel and South Africa supported the idea, but both respective countries were deemed inadvisable for hosting the conference.

The participants released a communiqué stating,

We, free peoples fighting for our national independence and human rights, assembled at Jamba, declare our solidarity with all freedom movements in the world and state our commitment to cooperate to liberate our nations from the Soviet Imperialists.

== 1990s ==
The National Assembly passed law 12/91 in May 1991, coinciding with the withdrawal of the last Cuban troops, defining Angola as a "democratic state based on the rule of law" with a multi-party system. Observers met such changes with skepticism. American journalist Karl Maier wrote, "In the New Angola ideology is being replaced by the bottom line, as security and selling expertise in weaponry have become a very profitable business. With its wealth in oil and diamonds, Angola is like a big swollen carcass and the vultures are swirling overhead. Savimbi's former allies are switching sides, lured by the aroma of hard currency."
