= Isaac Maria dos Anjos =

Angolan politician

Isaac Maria dos Anjos was the Angolan minister for agriculture and rural development in the 1994 government of Jose Eduardo dos Santos.
