= Branca Manuel Espirito Santo =

Angolan politician

Branca Manuel da Costa Neto do Espirito Santo is an Angolan politician who served as minister of Urbanism and Housing.

== Education and career ==
Santo is a graduate of Planning National Economy from the Martin Luther University of Halle-Wittenberg, German. He served as the president of Executive Committee of Imogestin and financial director of EPAL and former president of the Association of Real Estate Professionals of Angola. He was appointed the minister of Urbanism and Housing on 10 March 2016 by president José Eduardo Dos Santos. Santo replaced José António Maria Da Conceição e Silva.
