= Order of Agostinho Neto =

Angolan state award

Order of Agostinho Neto Ordem de Agostinho Neto

Awarded by the President of Angola
- Type: Civil order
- Established: 1990
- Country: Angola
- Ribbon
- Status: Active

Precedence
- Next (higher): Order of the National Hero
- Next (lower): Order of Independence

The Order of Agostinho Neto (Portuguese: Ordem de Agostinho Neto), also known as the Dr António Agostinho Neto Order, is a state award of Angola, established on 12 May 1990. From its establishment, the order was the highest state award, but in 2004 it took second position with the establishment of Order of the National Hero.

== List of recipients ==
Among those awarded are:

- (South Africa) Nelson Mandela (1990)
- (Angola) José Eduardo dos Santos (1991)
- (Zambia) Kenneth Kaunda (1992)
- (Gabon) Omar Bongo (1992)
- (Cuba) Fidel Castro (1992)
- (São Tomé and Príncipe) Manuel Pinto da Costa (1992)
- (Mozambique) Joaquim Chissano (1992)
- (Botswana) Quett Masire (1992)
- (Zimbabwe) Robert Mugabe (1992)
- (People's Republic of the Congo) Marien Ngouabi (1992; posthumously)
- (Republic of the Congo) Denis Sassou-Nguesso (1992)
- (Guinea-Bissau) João Bernardo Vieira (1992)
- (Cuba) Raúl Castro (2019)
- (Cuba) Miguel Díaz-Canel (2019)
- (Russia) Vladimir Putin (2019)
- (Portugal) Marcelo Rebelo de Sousa (2019)
- (Brazil) Luiz Inácio Lula da Silva (2023)
- (Italy) Sergio Mattarella (2023)
- (Italy) Laura Mattarella (2023)
- (Spain) King Felipe VI (2023)
- (Spain) Queen Letizia (2023)
- (Cape Verde) Aristides Pereira
- (Namibia) Sam Nujoma
- (Guinea) Ahmed Sékou Touré (2025)
- (Algeria) Abdelmadjid Tebboune (2026)

== See also ==
- Orders, decorations, and medals of Angola
