= Roberto Francisco de Almeida =

Angolan politician (born 1941)

Roberto de Almeida
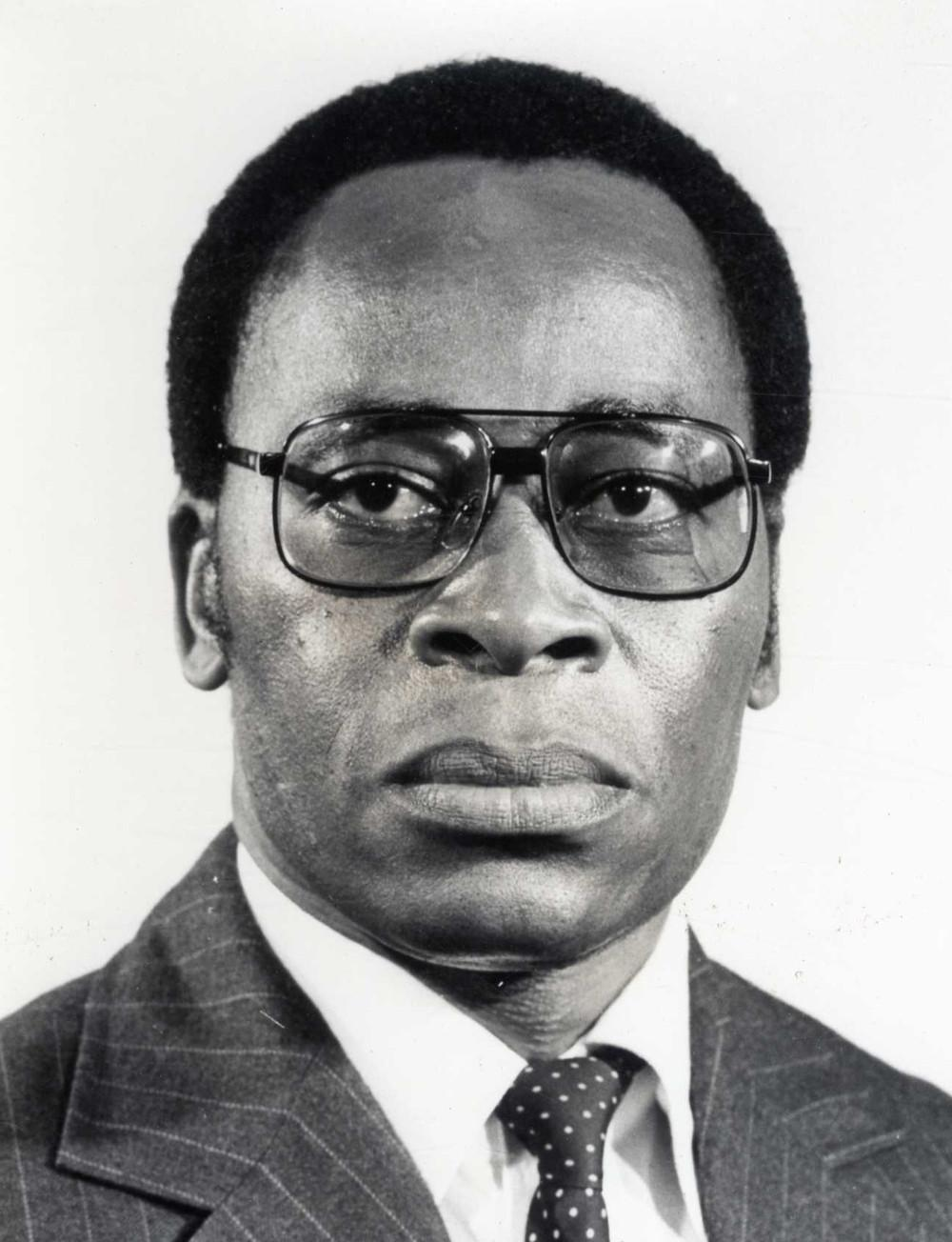

President of the National Assembly
- In office 3 June 1996 – 30 September 2008
- Preceded by: Fernando José de França Dias Van-Dúnem
- Succeeded by: Fernando da Piedade Dias dos Santos

Personal details
- Born: Roberto António Victor Francisco de Almeida; 5 February 1941 (age 85) Kaxikane (Cachimane), Catete, Bengo, near Luanda, Overseas Province of Angola, Portugal
- Party: MPLA

Roberto António Victor Francisco de Almeida (born 5 February 1941) is an Angolan activist and politician for the MPLA liberation movement and party, lawyer, journalist, writer and poet. He served as Deputy Foreign Minister (1976-1978), Minister of Foreign Trade (1978-1979), Minister of Planning (1979-1981), and the President of the National Assembly of Angola (1996-2008).

Besides being a politician, Almeida is also an established Portuguese-language writer, under the pseudonym Jofre Rocha.

== Publications ==
Rocha's publications include:

=== Poetry ===
- Rocha, Jofre (1973). Tempo de cicio [Time cycle]. Cadernos Capricórnio, 6 (in Portuguese). Capricórnio. 32 pages. Poetry.
- Rocha, Jofre (1977). Assim se fez madrugada : canções do povo e da revolução [This is how dawn broke: songs of the people and the revolution]. Colecção Autores angolanos, 9 (in Portuguese). Lisboa: Edições 70 (Ed. 70). OCLC 463073408. 78 pages. Poetry.
- Rocha, Jofre (1985). Crónicas de Ontem e de sempre [Chronicles of yesterday and forever]. Cadernos Lavra & Oficina, 47 (in Portuguese). Luanda: UEA - União dos Escritores Angolanos. LCCN 89191431. OCLC 21077361. 53 pages.
- Rocha, Jofre (1988). 60 canções de amor e luta : põesia [60 songs of love and struggle : poetry]. Contemporâneos (in Portuguese). Luanda: União dos escritores angolanos. OCLC 499453133. 82 pages. Poetry.

==== Anthology ====
- Rocha, Jofre (2014). Neto, Akiz (ed.). Contingência : afectos, revoltas e ternura : poesia de Jofre Rocha, antologia [Contingency : affections, revolts and tenderness : poetry by Jofre Rocha, anthology] (in Portuguese). Luanda, Angola; Lisboa: Ministério da Cultura, Comissão Organizadora do II Festival Nacional de Cultura; Mercado das Letras. OCLC 1352000355. 217 pages. Poetry.

=== Prose ===
==== Short stories ====
- Rocha, Jofre (1977). Estórias do Musseque [Stories from the Musseque (slum)]. Colecção Autores angolanos, 3 (in Portuguese). Lisboa / São Paulo: Edições 70 / Ática. OCLC 863325218. 88 pages. Short stories.

==== Politics ====
- Rocha, Jofre (2002). 10º aniversário da Assembleia Nacional [10th anniversary of the National Assembly, 1992-2002] (in Portuguese). Luanda: Assembléia Nacional. OCLC 940755050. 116 pages. Prose.
- Rocha, Jofre (2011). Peço a palavra : peças de oratória parlamentar [I request the floor: parliamentary oratory pieces]. Discursos, entrevistas & communicações, no. 1 (in Portuguese). Luanda: Kilombelombe. ISBN 9789898368157. OCLC 820553468. 460 pages. Prose.

== Public service ==
Political offices
Preceded by	Deputy Foreign Minister; 1976-1978	Succeeded by
Preceded by	Minister of Foreign Trade; 1978–1979	Succeeded by Lopo do Nascimento
Preceded by José Eduardo dos Santos	Minister of Planning; 1979–1981	Succeeded by Lopo do Nascimento
Preceded by Fernando José de França Dias Van-Dúnem	President of the National Assembly of Angola; 1996-2008	Succeeded by Fernando da Piedade Dias dos Santos

== Quote ==
The first lines of Rocha's Poem of Return are:

When I return from the land of exile and silence

Do not bring me flowers.

Bring me rather all the dews,
Tears of dawns which witnessed dramas.
Bring me the immense hunger for love
and the plaint of tumid sexes in the star-studded night.
Bring me the long night of sleeplessness
with mothers mourning, their arms bereft of sons.

...

— Beier & Moore 2007, p. 40.
