= Hélder Vieira Dias =

Angolan general

Hélder Vieira Dias Júnior

Head of Studies, Research and Analysis Office (GEPA)
- In office 1993–2017
- Preceded by: Lopo do Nascimento

Chief of the Military Staff of the President
- In office 1995–2017
- Preceded by: Osvaldo Serra Van-Dúnem

Director-General of the National Foreign Intelligence Service
- In office 2006–2006
- Preceded by: Fernando Garcia Miala
- Succeeded by: André Sango

Head of the President's Security Service
- In office 2012–2017
- Preceded by: Position established
- Succeeded by: Pedro Sebastião

Personal details
- Born: 4 October 1953 (age 72) Luanda, Angola
- Party: MPLA

General Manuel Hélder Vieira Dias Jr, known by the nickname "Kopelipa", is an Angolan general, former public official, and businessman with close ties to former Angolan President José Eduardo dos Santos. In 2014, his net worth was estimated at close to $3 billion. In 2021, the U.S. Treasury Department blocked his assets.

== Early life and education ==
Manuel Hélder Vieira Dias was born on 4 October 1953 in Luanda, Angola. Kopelipa belongs to an important Angolan family with strong ties to the MPLA. He is the nephew of Liceu Vieira Dias, who was a founder of the band Ngola Ritmos and the MPLA; the cousin of musician Ruy Mingas, who wrote the music for Angola Avante, Angola's national anthem; the cousin once removed of Filomeno do Nascimento Vieira Dias, the Archbishop of Luanda; and the cousin of opposition politician Filomeno Vieira Lopes.

== Career ==
Kopelipa was director of the National Reconstruction Office, a top governmental position in Angola. He was — along with fellow "top generals" Higino Carneiro, João Maria de Sousa, Roberto Leal Monteiro, and Kundi Paihama — one of the military leaders holding top ministerial posts for the People's Movement for the Liberation of Angola, the political party that ruled Angola since it gained its independence from Portugal in 1975. In 2018, the general was referred to as "the highest and most trusted member of the president’s entourage" and was a member of the trio of officials known as Dos Santos’s "Presidential Triumvirate,” along with Manuel Vicente and General Leopoldino “Dino” Fragoso do Nascimento. The 3 had built a secret banking network to move millions of dollars out of Angola.

== Personal life ==
In 2014, his net worth was estimated at close to $3 billion. He embezzled billions from the Angolan government and the U.S. Treasury Department blocked his assets in 2021.
