= Hélder Fernando Pitta Grós =

Angolan politician (born 1956)

Attorney-General of the Angolan Armed Forces
- In office 2017–2023

Attorney General of Angola
- Incumbent
- Assumed office 2023
- Preceded by: João Maria de Sousa

Personal details
- Born: Luanda, Angola
- Party: MPLA

Hélder Fernando Pitta Grós (born 19 March 1956) is an Angolan politician.

== Life and work ==
Grós was born 19 March 1956 in Luanda. He has held the Office of the Attorney General since December 2017.
