= Welwitschia dos Santos =

Angolan politician (born 1978)

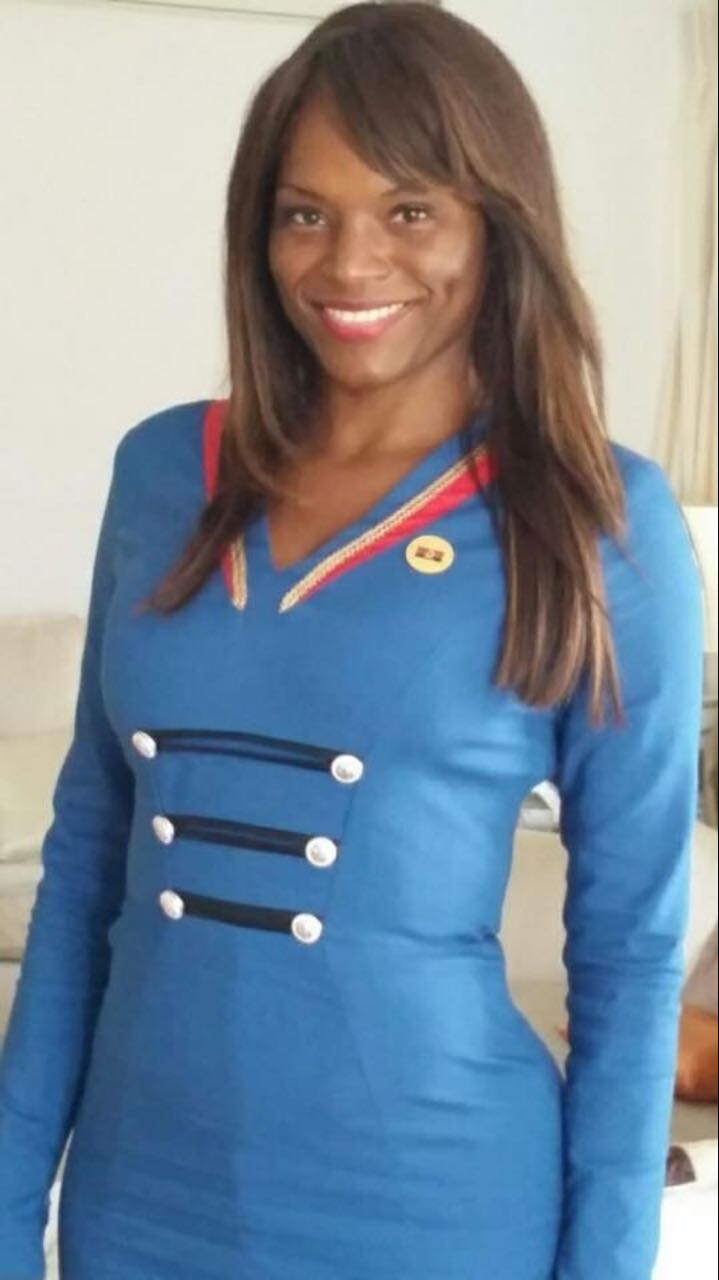

Member of Parliament
- In office 2008–2010

Personal details
- Born: 1978 (age 47–48) Luanda, Angola
- Party: MPLA
- Parent: José Eduardo dos Santos (father)

Welwitschia Abrantes José dos Santos (born 1978), known as Tchizé dos Santos, is an Angolan politician and businesswoman. She was a member of parliament for the MPLA in the National Assembly until mid-2010.

== Biography ==
Tchizé, as she is also known, is the daughter from the second marriage of Angolan President José Eduardo dos Santos. She studied media production in London, England and since 2009 has served as an advisor on the Technical Commission of the state television channel TPA, overseeing its restructuring. She played a key role in the channel's internationalization via satellite television. She holds a management position at TPA 2, and is also involved in two media and communications companies, Semba Comunicações and West Side Investments. In addition to her television activities, Welwitschia dos Santos also has a foothold in the world of finance. She owns 13.3 percent of the Angolan Banco de Negócios Internacional (BNI).

She has been instrumental in initiating a second new Angolan private television project called AngoTV since 2010.

Tchizé dos Santos is also an investor and owner of a large housing development in São Francisco (Portugal), a district of Alcochete in Portugal.

Welwitschia dos Santos was elected to the National Assembly in the 2008 Angolan parliamentary election. She has been married to Hugo Pêgo, an agricultural engineer from Portugal, since Christmas 2003. They have two children.
