= Democratic People's Republic of Angola =

Unrecognized government (1975–2002)

Democratic People's Republic of Angola República Popular Democrática de Angola
- 1975–1976; 1979–2002
- Flag Emblem
- Motto: Socialismo, Negritude, Democracia, Não-alinhamento (Portuguese); (English: "Socialism – Negritude – Democracy – Non-Alignment")
- Maximum extent of territory, March 1993 Territory claimed but not controlled
- Status: Rival government
- Capital: Huambo (de jure); Jamba (de facto)
- Common languages: Portuguese
- President
  - 1975–1976: Holden Roberto and Jonas Savimbi
  - 1979–2002: Jonas Savimbi
  - 2002: Paulo Lukamba Gato
- Prime Minister
  - 1975–1976: José Ndele and Johnny Eduardo Pinnock
- Historical era: Cold War
  - RPDA proclaimed: 11 November 1975
  - RPDA suppressed: 11 February 1976
  - RPDA reestablished: 1979
  - RPDA dissolution: 4 April 2002
Preceded by
1975: Overseas Province of Angola
1975: Revolutionary Government of Angola in Exile
1979: People's Republic of Angola
Succeeded by
1976: People's Republic of Angola
2002: Republic of Angola
- Today part of: Angola

The Democratic People's Republic of Angola (Portuguese: República Popular Democrática de Angola, RPDA), also referred to as Free Angola (Angola Livre) or the Free Land of Angola (Terra Livre de Angola), was a rival government to that of the People's Republic of Angola during the nation's civil war.

It was declared by the FNLA and UNITA in the city of Huambo. It was formed during the dawn of Angolan independence, in November 1975, though by February 1976, its FNLA forces had been largely defeated by the MPLA of the People's Republic of Angola. The Democratic People's Republic, at first, was inspired by Maoism and the Chinese Communist Revolution, including an explicit mention of the construction of socialism in its program, but later moved towards anti-communist positions. It was initially supported by the People's Republic of China and, later, by South Africa and the United States.

== See also ==
- List of heads of state of the Democratic People's Republic of Angola
- List of heads of government of the Democratic People's Republic of Angola
