= Fernando da Piedade Dias dos Santos =

Angolan politician (1950–2025)

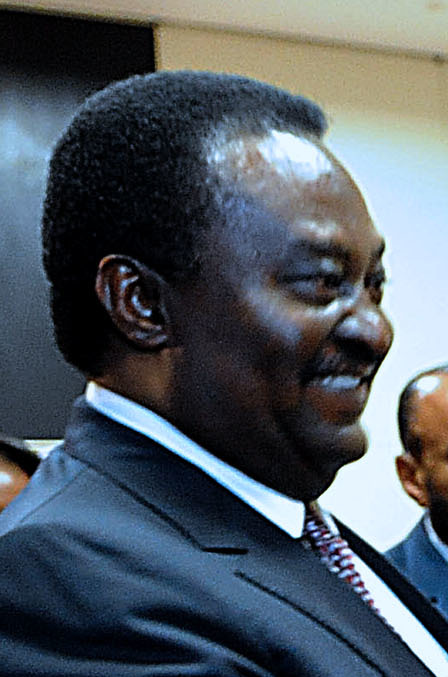

President of the National Assembly
- In office 27 September 2012 – 15 September 2022
- Preceded by: Paulo Kassoma
- Succeeded by: Carolina Cerqueira
- In office 30 September 2008 – 9 February 2010
- Preceded by: Roberto Francisco de Almeida
- Succeeded by: Paulo Kassoma

Vice President of Angola
- In office 18 February 2010 – 26 September 2012
- President: José Eduardo dos Santos
- Preceded by: Office established
- Succeeded by: Manuel Vicente

Prime Minister of Angola
- In office 6 December 2002 – 30 September 2008
- President: José Eduardo dos Santos
- Preceded by: F. J. de F. Dias Van-Dúnem (1999)
- Succeeded by: Paulo Kassoma

Minister of the Interior
- In office 29 January 1999 – 6 December 2002
- Preceded by: Santana André Pitra
- Succeeded by: O. de J. Serra Van-Dúnem

Personal details
- Born: 5 March 1950 Luanda, Portuguese Angola
- Died: 18 December 2025 (aged 75)
- Party: MPLA
- Spouse: Maria Tomé Dias dos Santos
- Children: 7
- Education: Agostinho Neto University

Fernando da Piedade Dias dos Santos (5 March 1950 – 18 December 2025), known as Nandó, was an Angolan politician who was the first vice president of Angola from February 2010 to September 2012. He was the prime minister of Angola from 2002 to 2008 and president of the National Assembly of Angola from 2008 to 2010. He again served as president of the National Assembly from 2012 to 2022.

== Early life and education ==
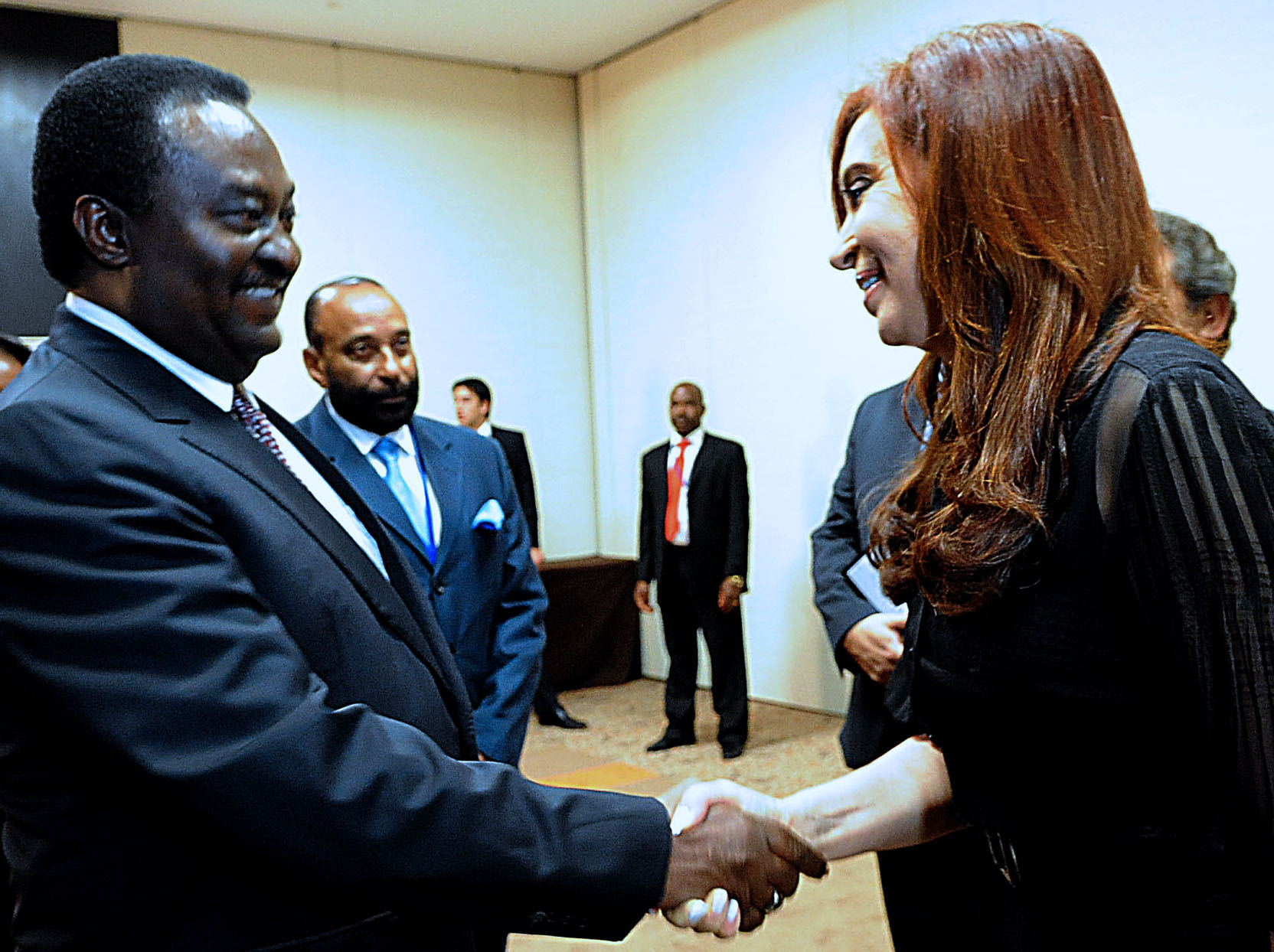
Piedade meeting with President of Argentina Cristina Fernández de Kirchner, on 17 May 2012

Fernando da Piedade Dias dos Santos was born in Luanda, Portuguese Angola to parents emigrating to Angola from São Tomé and Príncipe. Piedade was a cousin of President José Eduardo dos Santos. He obtained a BA in law in 2009 at Agostinho Neto University in Angola.

== Career ==
In 1971, Piedade joined the Popular Movement for the Liberation of Angola (MPLA). Following Angola's independence from Portugal in 1975, he began a career in the People's Police Corps of Angola, becoming a division head in 1978. In 1981, he moved to the Ministry of the Interior, becoming Deputy Minister in 1984. The following year, he was elected as a member of the MPLA-Workers' Party congress and given the rank of colonel in the Angolan military. He later became a member of the People's Assembly, beginning a succession of appointments to government ministerial posts.

After having served as Interior Minister since 1999, Piedade was appointed prime minister in November 2002 and took office on 6 December 2002. The office of prime minister had previously been unoccupied for three years.

Piadade was the 14th candidate on the MPLA's national list in the September 2008 legislative election. In the election, the MPLA won an overwhelming majority, and Piedade was elected to a seat in the National Assembly.

Following the 2008 election, the MPLA Political Bureau chose Piedade to become the president of the National Assembly on 26 September 2008. It also chose Paulo Kassoma to replace Piedade as prime minister. On 30 September, the newly elected members of the National Assembly met and were sworn in; Piedade was elected as president of the National Assembly on this occasion, receiving 211 votes in favor and three opposed.

On 21 January 2010, the National Assembly approved a new constitution that would increase presidential powers, eliminate the office of prime minister, and eliminate popular elections for the office of president. Piedade described the National Assembly's adoption of the constitution as a "historic moment". President dos Santos then appointed Piedade to the newly established office of vice-president of Angola on 3 February 2010. Having long served as a close and powerful associate of dos Santos, his appointment as vice-president made it appear more likely that he was being envisioned as the eventual successor to dos Santos. However, dos Santos had already been designated as the MPLA candidate for president in 2012, suggesting that he had no intention of retiring.

In 2012, Manuel Vicente, who had headed the state oil company Sonangol, was believed to have been selected by the President as his likely successor. Vicente was designated as the second candidate on the MPLA's list of parliamentary candidates, making him the party's nominee for the post of vice-president. Following the MLPA's victory in the 2012 legislative election, Vicente took office as vice president on 26 September 2012, succeeding Piedade. On 27 September 2012, Piedade was instead elected as President of the National Assembly.

== Personal life and death ==
Dos Santos was married to Maria Tomé Dias dos Santos, and together they had seven children. He died on 18 December 2025, at the age of 75.

Political offices
Vacant Title last held by F. J. de F. Dias Van-Dúnem	Prime Minister of Angola; 2002–2008	Succeeded by Paulo Kassoma
New office	Vice President of Angola; 2010–2012	Succeeded by Manuel Vicente
