= Leopoldino Fragoso do Nascimento =

Angolan government official

Head of the President's Communication Service

Personal details
- Born: June 5, 1963 (age 62) Luanda, Angola
- Party: MPLA

Leopoldino Fragoso do Nascimento, aka "General Dino", was the Head of the Angolan President's Communication Service under José Eduardo dos Santos' presidency and the Chairman of the Board of Directors of the Cochan Group, one of the top economic groups in Angola. He embezzled billions and was sanctioned by the U.S. Department of the Treasury in 2021.

== Early life and education ==
Leopoldino Fragoso do Nascimento was born in Luanda, Angola in 1963. He acquired a degree in telecommunication engineering.

== Career ==
Do Nascimento, aka General Dino, was the Head of the Angolan President's Communication Service under José Eduardo dos Santos' presidency and the Chairman of the Board of Directors of the Cochan Group, one of the top economic groups in Angola. Fragoso do Nascimento has been a partner of Trafigura since 2009. do Nascimento is a founding partner of Unitel Telecom, Kinaxixe Real Estate, Zahara Logistics, Kero Supermarkets and Biocom – Bio Fuels. As of 2019, he had "20 years of experience" in which he held 7 years experience in Puma Energy/Industry, serving as Director at Puma Energy Holdings Pte Ltd. Bloomberg described him as "one of Africa’s foremost entrepreneurs".

Do Nascimento has been described as one of three members of a triumvirate alongside Manuel Vicente and Manuel Hélder Vieira Dias Junior to move millions of dollars out of Angola.

On 9 December 2021, the U.S. Department of the Treasury added do Nascimento and two of his companies - Cochan Holdings and Cochan SA - to its Specially Designated Nationals (SDN) list. Individuals on the list have their assets blocked and U.S. persons are generally prohibited from dealing with them.
