= Ministry of Justice (Angola) =

Government ministry of Angola

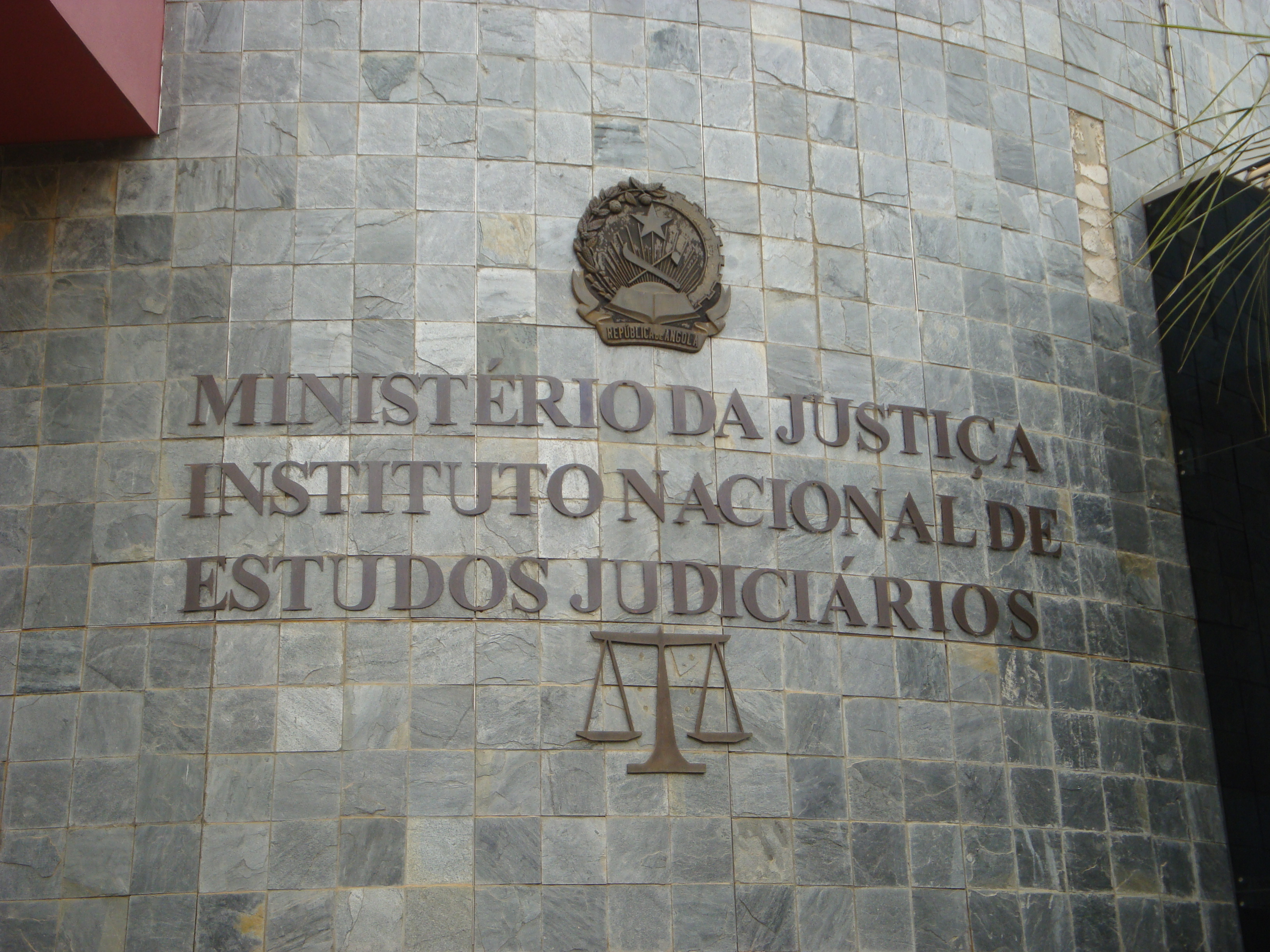
Facade of the ministry in Luanda

The Ministry of Justice and Human Rights of Angola (Portuguese: Ministério da Justiça e dos Direitos Humanos) is judiciary arm of government that specializes on human rights in the nation of Angola.

== History ==
The Ministry of Justice and Human Rights of Angola was established on November 12, 1975 by Law No. 1/75 after the country declared its independence.

== Duties and responsibilities ==
The Ministry of Justice and Human Rights of Angola has the following duties:

- To design, establish, establish and conduct the administration of justice policy
- Conceive, establish, outline and conduct the policy for the promotion and protection of human rights
- To elaborate and propose legal norms on the organization of the courts
- To exercise supervision, coordination and methodological guidance on the organic activity of the Provincial and Municipal Courts
- Take measures to achieve a justice aimed at harmonizing all the social trends of the country
- To ensure the proper functioning of the system of judicial administration in judicial matters and in the areas of legal traffic safety, dispute prevention and non-judicial resolution of disputes
- Provide for the adoption of normative measures adequate to the pursuit of the justice policies defined by the executive branch, as well as to ensure the study, elaboration and follow-up of the implementation of integrated normative measures in the area of justice
- Recruit, train, promote, as well as exercise you can discipline officers of the judiciary and other personnel of the general regime
- To ensure the formation of the necessary personnel for the exercise of the specific functions in the area of justice
- To manage human resources assigned to the administration of justice, without prejudice to the competence of other organs
- Ensure legal and judicial cooperation with other governments and international organizations
- To legally advise all the structures and entities of the executive branch, as long as they use and are authorized by the competent authorities
- To study, propose and collaborate in the elaboration and systematization of the country's legislation, in the dissemination of the law and in the formation of the juridical and social conscience of the citizen
- Prepare the annual legislative plan of the Ministry to be submitted to the approval of the holder of the executive branch
- Assuming responsibility for public records, namely, civil, commercial, real estate, motor vehicles and other movable property subject to registration, in accordance with the law
- To coordinate activities relating to the right of asylum and to actions resulting from anti-drug conventions
- Ensure and promote respect for human rights in the various domains, throughout the national territory
- To guarantee the exchange between the Minsitério and other organisms that intervene in the protection of the political, economic and social rights of the citizens
- Create mechanisms to control the policies outlined for the promotion and protection of human rights
- To propose measures of prevention and violation of human rights
- To carry out studies aimed at improving the organs that intervene in the observance and respect for human rights
- To carry out other activities assigned to it by law

== List of ministers (Post-1975 upon achieving independence) ==
- Jose Alberto Deheza (1975)
- Diógenes Boavida (1975–1986)
- Fernando França Van-Dúnem (1986–1990)
- Lázaro Manuel Dias (1990–1992)
- Paulo Tchipilica (1992–2004)
- Manuel Miguel da Costa Aragão (2004–2008)
- Guilhermina Contreiras da Costa Prata (2008–2012) [1st female]
- Rui Jorge Carneiro Mangueira (2012–2017)
- Francisco Manuel Monteiro de Queiróz (2017–2022)
- Marcy Cláudio Lopes (2022–present)

== See also ==
- Justice ministry
- Office of the Attorney General (Angola)
- Politics of Angola
