= Office of the Attorney General (Angola) =

The Office of the Attorney General of Angola (Procuradoria-Geral da República) primarily represents the state—particularly with criminal prosecutions. Additionally, the Attorney General of Angola defends the legality of judicial functions, monitor for procedural compliance in the court system, and defend the legal rights of individuals and corporations. By the Constitution of Angola, the office is given administrative and financial autonomy.

== Composition ==
The office is composed of three departments: Public Prosecutor's Office (which is composed of the public prosecutors who represent the state), Supreme Judicial Council of the Public Prosecutor's Office (which manages and regulates the public prosecutors), and the Military Prosecutor's Office (which primarily oversees the legality of the natural security bodies—e.g., Angolan Armed Forces, National Police Force, etc.). The position of the Attorney General is appointed for a five-year term that might be renewed by the President of the Republic of Angola upon the recommendation of the Supreme Judicial Council.

== List of attorneys general ==
- Manuel Rui (1975-1977)
- Antero de Abreu (1977–1993)
- Domingos Culolo (1993–2002)
- Augusto da Costa Carneiro (2002–2007)
- João Maria de Sousa (2007–2017)
- Hélder Fernando Pitta Grós (2017–present)

== See also ==
- Attorney general
- Justice minister
- Ministry of Justice (Angola)
