= Orders, decorations, and medals of Angola =

Orders, decorations, and medals of Angola include:

- Order of the National Hero (Ordem do Herói Nacional; two classes)
- Order of Independence (Ordem da Independência; three classes)
- Order of Civil Merit (Ordem do Mérito Civil; three classes)
- Order of the Freedom Fighters (Ordem dos Combatentes da Liberdade; three classes)
- Order of Agostinho Neto (Ordem Agostinho Neto; two classes)
- Order of Military Merit (Ordem do Mérito Militar; five classes)
- Order of Police Merit (Ordem do Mérito Policial; three classes)
- Order of Peace and Concord (Ordem da Paz e da Concórdia; three classes)
- Medal of Bravery and of Civic and Social Merit (Medalha de Bravura e do Mérito Cívico e Social; three classes)
- Medal of 11 November (Medalha 11 de Novembro; single class)
- Medal of the Star of Liberation (Medalha Estrela da Liberdade; three classes)
- Medal of Military Merit (Medalha do Mérito Militar; three classes)
- Medal of Police Merit (Medalha do Mérito Policial; three classes)

Medals of the Angolan Armed Forces:

- Medal of the Military Palm (Medalha da Palma Militar; single class)
- Medal of Valor of the Angolan Armed Forces (Medalha do Valor das Forças Armadas Angolanas; three classes)
- Medal of National Defense (Medalha da Defesa Nacional; three classes)
- Military Medal for Distinguished Service (Medalha Militar dos Serviços Distintos; three classes)
- Military Medal for Length of Service (Medalha Militar de Tempo de Serviço; three classes)
- Military Medal of Solidarity and Peacekeeping (Medalha Militar de Solidariedade e Manutenção de Paz; three classes)
- Medal of International Military Solidarity (Medalha de Solidariedade Internacional Militar; single class)
- Commemorative Medal of the Angolan Armed Forces (Medalha Comemorativa das Forças Armadas Angolanas; single class)
