= Marcy Cláudio Lopes =

Angolan politician (born 1981)

Marcy Cláudio Lopes (born 6 December 1981) is an Angolan politician.

== Life and work ==
Lopes was born 6 December 1981 in Luanda. He is a member of the People's Movement for the Liberation of Angola (MPLA). He has served as the minister of justice since 2022.
