= List of heads of government of Democratic People's Republic of Angola =

This is a list of heads of government of the Democratic People's Republic of Angola. Angola is a country in southern Africa bordered by Namibia on the south, the Democratic Republic of the Congo on the north, and Zambia on the east; its west coast is on the Atlantic Ocean. Since the adoption of a new constitution, early in 2010, the politics of Angola takes place in a framework of a presidential republic, whereby the President of Angola is both head of state and head of government, and of a multi-party system. Executive power is exercised by the government. Legislative power is vested in the President, the government and parliament.

Tenure	Incumbent	Affiliation	Notes
23 November 1975 to 11 February 1976	José Ndele, Prime Minister	UNITA	Joint Prime Minister
23 November 1975 to 11 February 1976	Johnny Eduardo Pinnock, Prime Minister	FNLA	Joint Prime Minister

== Affiliations ==
FNLA	Frente Nacional de Libertação de Angola
FNLA	(National Front for the Liberation of Angola) northern regionalist, estd.1957 as UPNA: (Unio das Populacoes do Norte de Angola)
UNITA	União Nacional para a Independência Total de Angola
UNITA	(National Union for the Total Independence of Angola) authoritarian/conservative, primarily ethnic Ovimbundu

== See also ==
- Angola
  - Heads of state of Angola
  - Heads of government of Angola
  - Colonial heads of Angola
  - List of leaders of Angola
- Lists of office-holders
