= Francisco Manuel de Queiróz =

Angolan politician

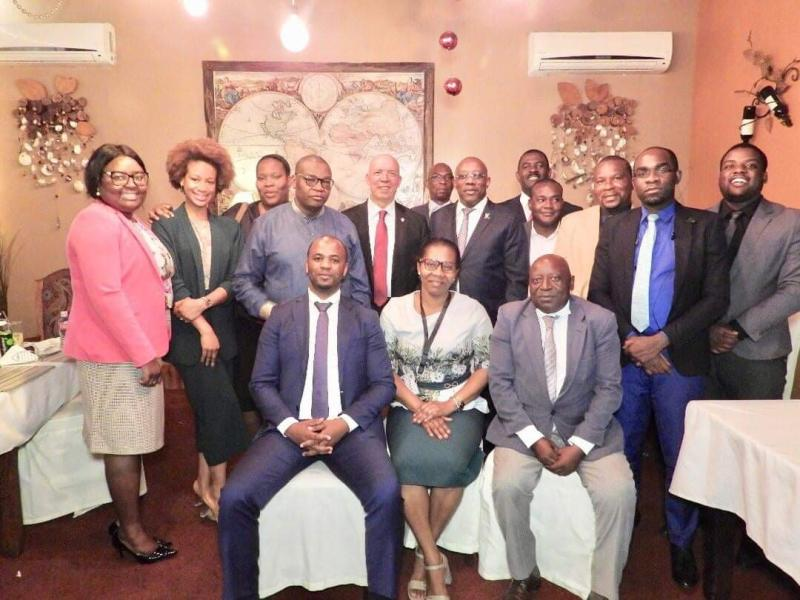
- Queiróz in centre with a red tie
- Born: Francisco Manuel Monteiro de Queiróz; Angola
- Occupation(s): Politician, writer

Francisco Manuel Monteiro de Queiróz is an Angolan politician and cabinet minister. He is a member of parliament. He is member of MPLA.

Queiróz was born in Kuito on 7 June 1951. He has a law degree from Agostinho Neto University. He was appointed Minister of Geology and Mines from August 2012 to September 2017, and Minister of Justice from September 2017 until 2022.
