= Roberto Leal Monteiro =

Angolan politician

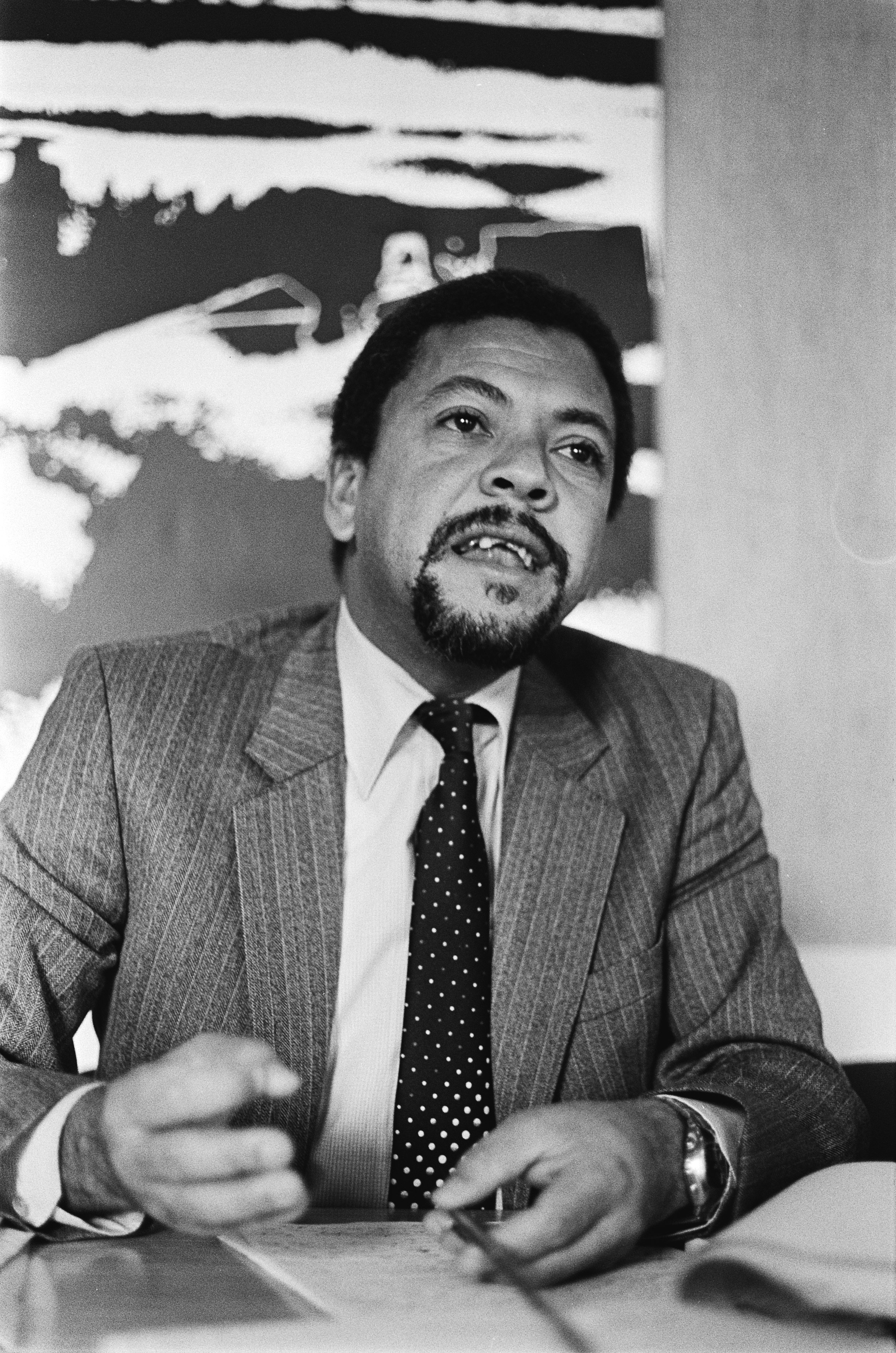
- Monteiro in 1982

Ambassador of Angola to Russia
- In office 1999–2006
- Preceded by: Luís Doukoui de Castro
- Succeeded by: Samuel Tito Armando

Minister of the Interior
- In office 2006–2010
- Preceded by: Osvaldo Serra Van-Dúnem
- Succeeded by: Sebastião J.A. Martins

Personal details
- Party: MPLA

General Roberto Leal Monteiro, nicknamed Ngongo, is Home Affairs Minister of Angola, a top governmental position in that country. He is — along with fellow "top generals" Higino Carneiro, João Maria de Sousa, Hélder Vieira Dias, and Kundi Paihama — one of the military leaders holding top ministerial posts for the Popular Movement for the Liberation of Angola, the political party that has ruled Angola since it gained its independence from Portugal in 1975.
