= List of ambassadors of Russia to São Tomé and Príncipe =

Ambassador of the Russian Federation to the Democratic Republic of São Tomé and Príncipe
- Embaixador Extraordinário e Plenipotenciário da Federação da Rússia na República Democrática de São Tomé e Príncipe
- Emblem of the Russian Foreign Ministry
- Incumbent; Vacant
- Ministry of Foreign Affairs; Embassy of Russia in Luanda
- Style: His Excellency; The Honourable
- Reports to: Minister of Foreign Affairs
- Seat: Luanda
- Appointer: President of Russia
- Term length: At the pleasure of the president
- Website: Embassy of Russia in Angola

The ambassador of Russia to São Tomé and Príncipe is the official representative of the president and the government of the Russian Federation to the president and the government of São Tomé and Príncipe.

The ambassador is a non-resident diplomat, with dual accreditation as the Russian ambassador to Angola, where he and his staff work at large in the Russian embassy in Luanda. The post of Russian ambassador to São Tomé and Príncipe is currently vacant, following the recall of Vladimir Tararov, on 18 August 2025.

== History of diplomatic relations ==
Formal diplomatic relations between São Tomé and Príncipe and the Soviet Union were established on 9 August 1975. The incumbent ambassador to the Republic of the Congo, Yevgeny Afanasenko, was given dual accreditation to São Tomé and Príncipe on 14 May 1976. He served until the opening of the embassy in São Tomé in 1978, and the appointment of Dmitry Dyakonov as the first ambassador solely accredited to São Tomé and Príncipe.

Exchange of ambassadors continued throughout the rest of the existence of the Soviet Union. With the dissolution of the Soviet Union in 1991, São Tomé and Príncipe recognised the Russian Federation as its successor state on 31 December 1991. The incumbent Soviet ambassador, Sergey Sinitsyn, continued in post as the Russian ambassador until 1992. That year the embassy in São Tomé was closed as part of cost-saving measures, and thereafter Russian interests have been represented by the embassy in Angola, with the Russian ambassador to Angola dually accredited to São Tomé and Príncipe.

== List of representatives of Russia to São Tomé and Príncipe (1975–present) ==
=== Soviet Union to São Tomé and Príncipe (1975–1991) ===
Name	Title	Appointment	Termination	Notes
Yevgeny Afanasenko	Ambassador	14 May 1976	18 September 1978	Concurrently ambassador to the Republic of the Congo; Credentials presented on 12 June 1976
Dmitry Dyakonov	Ambassador	18 September 1978	29 August 1981	Credentials presented on 12 January 1979
Pyotr Yevsyukov	Ambassador	29 August 1981	8 July 1986	Credentials presented on 18 September 1981
Vladimir Kuznetsov	Ambassador	8 July 1986	19 April 1990	
Sergey Sinitsyn	Ambassador	7 December 1990	25 December 1991	

=== Russian Federation to São Tomé and Príncipe (1992–present) ===
Name	Title	Appointment	Termination	Notes
Sergey Sinitsyn	Ambassador	25 December 1991	2 November 1992	
Yury Kapralov	Ambassador	2 November 1992	26 June 1995	Concurrently ambassador to Angola
Vladimir Rayevsky	Ambassador	26 June 1995	17 December 1999	Concurrently ambassador to Angola
Sergey Andreyev	Ambassador	21 December 1999	14 August 2002	Concurrently ambassador to Angola
Andrey Kemarsky	Ambassador	14 August 2002	14 September 2007	Concurrently ambassador to Angola
Sergey Nenashev	Ambassador	14 September 2007	19 October 2012	Concurrently ambassador to Angola
Dmitry Lobach	Ambassador	19 October 2012	23 May 2017	Concurrently ambassador to Angola
Vladimir Tararov	Ambassador	30 May 2017	18 August 2025	Concurrently ambassador to Angola; Credentials presented on 16 August 2017
Aleksandr Bryantsev	Temporary Chargé d'affaires	18 August 2025		
