= Paulo Kassoma =

Angolan politician

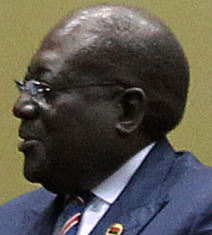
- Kassoma in 2011

Minister of Transports and Communication
- In office 1990–1992
- Preceded by: Carlos Fernandes
- Succeeded by: André Luís Brandão

Minister of Territory Administration
- In office 1992–1994
- Preceded by: Lopo do Nascimento
- Succeeded by: Aníbal Rocha

Governor of Huambo
- In office 1997–2008
- Preceded by: Baltazar Manuel
- Succeeded by: Albino Malungo

5th Prime Minister of Angola
- In office 30 September 2008 – 8 February 2010
- President: José Eduardo dos Santos
- Preceded by: Fernando da Piedade Dias dos Santos
- Succeeded by: Office abolished

President of the National Assembly
- In office 9 February 2010 – 27 September 2012
- Preceded by: Fernando da Piedade Dias dos Santos
- Succeeded by: Fernando da Piedade Dias dos Santos

Secretary-General of the MPLA
- In office 27 August 2016 – 8 September 2018
- Preceded by: Julião Mateus Paulo
- Succeeded by: Álvaro de Boavida Neto

Personal details
- Born: 6 June 1951 (age 75) Rangel, Overseas Province of Angola, Portugal
- Party: People's Movement for the Liberation of Angola

António Paulo Kassoma (born 6 June 1951) is an Angolan politician. He was named Prime Minister of Angola in September 2008 and remained in office until the new constitution replaced this function in February 2010. Kassoma then served as President of the National Assembly of Angola from 2010 to 2012. On August 27, 2016 Kassoma was named Party Secretary of the People's Movement for the Liberation of Angola.

== Biography ==
Kassoma was born in Rangel municipality, located in Luanda, the capital. His parents, Paulo Kassoma and Laurinda Katuta, were from Bailundo, a town in Huambo Province. He studied electromechanical engineering.

From 1978 to 1979, Kassoma was Deputy Minister of Defense for Weapons and Technology in the government of the People's Movement for the Liberation of Angola (MPLA). He was later Deputy Minister of Transport and Communication from 1988 to 1989, then Minister of Transport and Communications from 1989 to 1992. He was moved to the post of Minister of Territorial Administration on 9 April 1992.

Kassoma was later the governor of Huambo Province and First Secretary of the MPLA in Huambo Province. On 11 February 2002, Kassoma offered white farmers in Zimbabwe who lost their farms as a result of that country's land reform the opportunity to resettle on 10,000 hectares of abandoned farmland in Huambo (specifically, in Chipipa) and grow maize. According to Kassoma, this could contribute to Huambo's economic development. At the party's Fifth Ordinary Congress in December 2003, Kassoma was elected to the MPLA Political Bureau.

On 26 September 2008, following the MPLA's victory in the September 2008 legislative election, the MPLA Political Bureau chose Kassoma to succeed Fernando da Piedade Dias dos Santos as prime minister. In accordance with the Political Bureau's decision, President José Eduardo dos Santos appointed Kassoma as prime minister on 30 September 2008; in the same decree, he dismissed Kassoma from his post as Governor of Huambo Province. Kassoma was sworn in by dos Santos at the Presidential Palace in Luanda on the same day. Speaking to the press afterwards, Kassoma said that he would place a priority on accelerating the process of national reconstruction. He said that he was proud of his appointment, while also expressing some sadness about leaving the people of Huambo.

Kassoma's government was appointed on 1 October. There were 35 members of this government, 17 of whom were new to the government.

Under the terms of a new constitution passed by the National Assembly on 21 January 2010, the office of prime minister was eliminated. Kassoma was then designated as President of the National Assembly, replacing Fernando da Piedade Dias dos Santos, who was appointed Vice-President of Angola. Following the 2012 legislative election, Piedade was elected to replace Kassoma as president of the National Assembly on 27 September 2012.

On 28 June 2013, Kassoma was designated as chairman of the board of directors of Banco Espírito Santo Angola, a major bank in Angola. He consequently was replaced in his seat in the National Assembly on 18 July 2013.

Political offices
Preceded by Lopo do Nascimento	Minister of Territory Administration; 1992–1994	Succeeded by José Aníbal Lopes Rocha
Preceded by Fernando da Piedade Dias dos Santos	Prime Minister of Angola; 2008–2010	Succeeded by Position abolished
