= List of heads of state of the Democratic People's Republic of Angola =

(Bold italics in name indicates popular nickname)

Tenure	Incumbent	Affiliation	Notes
11 November 1975 to 11 February 1976	Holden Álvaro Roberto, President of the Joint National Council for the Revolution	FNLA	
11 November 1975 to 11 February 1976	Jonas Malheiro Savimbi, President of the Joint National Council for the Revolution	UNITA	
11 February 1976	Counter-government suppressed by Angolan government		
1979	Counter-government restored		
1979 to 22 February 2002	Jonas Malheiro Savimbi, President	UNITA	
22 February 2002 to 4 April 2002	Paulo Lukamba Gato, interim leader, Secretary-General of UNITA	UNITA	
4 April 2002	Accord ends Civil War		

== Affiliations ==
FNLA	Frente Nacional de Libertação de Angola
FNLA	(National Front for the Liberation of Angola) northern regionalist, estd.1957 as UPNA: (Unio das Populacoes do Norte de Angola)
UNITA	União Nacional para a Independência Total de Angola
UNITA	(National Union for the Total Independence of Angola) authoritarian/conservative, primarily ethnic Ovimbundu

== Sources ==
- Schemmel, B. "Countries An-Az". Rulers.
- African States and Rulers, John Stewart, McFarland
- Heads of State and Government, 2nd Edition, John V da Graca, MacMillan Press 2000

== See also ==
- Angola
  - Democratic People's Republic of Angola
  - Heads of state of Angola
  - Heads of government of Angola
  - Colonial heads of Angola
  - Heads of government of the Democratic People's Republic of Angola
- Lists of office-holders
