= List of presidents of the National Assembly of Angola =

The President of the National Assembly of Angola is the presiding officer in the National Assembly of Angola.

== Presidents of the National Assembly of Angola ==
No.	President	Took office	Left office	Tenure	Party
Presidents (Speakers) of the People's Assembly of Angola
1	José Eduardo dos Santos (1942–2022)	9 November 1980	26 October 1992	11 years, 352 days	MPLA
Presidents (Speakers) of the National Assembly of Angola
2	Fernando José de França Dias Van-Dúnem (1934–2024)	26 October 1992	3 June 1996	3 years, 221 days	MPLA
3	Roberto Francisco de Almeida (born 1941)	3 June 1996	30 September 2008	12 years, 119 days	MPLA
4	Fernando da Piedade Dias dos Santos (1950–2025); 1st time	30 September 2008	9 February 2010	1 year, 132 days	MPLA
5	Paulo Kassoma (born 1951)	9 February 2010	27 September 2012	2 years, 231 days	MPLA
(4)	Fernando da Piedade Dias dos Santos (1950–2025); 2nd time	27 September 2012	16 September 2022	9 years, 354 days	MPLA
6	Carolina Cerqueira (born 1956)	16 September 2022	17 November 2025	3 years, 62 days	MPLA
7	Adão Francisco Correia de Almeida (born 1979)	17 November 2025	Incumbent	354 days	MPLA
