= Ecunha =

Ecunha Ekunha
- Municipality and town
- Location in Angola
- Coordinates: 12°20′S 15°30′E
- Country: Angola
- Province: Huambo

Population (2014 Census)
  - Municipality and town: 82,541
  - Urban: 13,997
- Time zone: UTC+1 (WAT)
- Climate: Cwb

Ecunha is a town and municipality in the province of Huambo, Angola. The municipality had a population of 82,541 in 2014.
