= Johnny Eduardo Pinnock =

Angolan politician

Johnny Eduardo Pinnock (1942 - 2000) served as Joint Prime Minister of the Democratic People's Republic of Angola, alongside José Ndele, from November 23, 1975, to February 11, 1976. His political party was FNLA.
