= List of prime ministers of Angola =

This article lists the prime ministers of Angola, from the establishment of the office of prime minister in 1975. The office was abolished in the constitution of 2010.

== Prime ministers of Angola (1975–2010) ==
| No. | Portrait | Prime Minister | Took office | Left office | Time in office | Party | Election | Ref. |
People's Republic of Angola
| 1 | Lopo do Nascimento | Lopo do Nascimento (born 1942) | 11 November 1975 | 9 December 1978 | 3 years, 28 days | MPLA | — | |
Post abolished (9 December 1978 – 19 July 1991)
| 2 | Fernando José de França Dias Van-Dúnem | Fernando José de França Dias Van-Dúnem (1934–2024) | 19 July 1991 | 27 August 1992 | 1 year, 39 days | MPLA | — | |
Republic of Angola
| (2) | Fernando José de França Dias Van-Dúnem | Fernando José de França Dias Van-Dúnem (1934–2024) | 27 August 1992 | 2 December 1992 | 97 days | MPLA | — | |
| 3 | Marcolino Moco | Marcolino Moco (born 1953) | 2 December 1992 | 3 June 1996 | 3 years, 184 days | MPLA | 1992 | |
| (2) | Fernando José de França Dias Van-Dúnem | Fernando José de França Dias Van-Dúnem (1934–2024) | 3 June 1996 | 29 January 1999 | 2 years, 240 days | MPLA | — | |
Vacant (29 January 1999 – 6 December 2002)
| 4 | Fernando da Piedade Dias dos Santos | Fernando da Piedade Dias dos Santos (1950–2025) | 6 December 2002 | 30 September 2008 | 5 years, 299 days | MPLA | — | |
| 5 | Paulo Kassoma | Paulo Kassoma (born 1951) | 30 September 2008 | 4 February 2010 | 1 year, 127 days | MPLA | 2008 | |

== Timeline ==
This is a graphical lifespan timeline of the prime ministers of Angola. They are listed in order of first assuming office.

The following chart lists prime ministers by lifespan (living prime ministers on the green line), with the years outside of their premiership in beige.

The following chart shows prime ministers by their age (living prime ministers in green), with the years of their premiership in blue.

== See also ==
- President of Angola
  - List of presidents of Angola
- Vice President of Angola
- Prime Minister of Angola
- List of colonial governors of Angola
- List of heads of state of Democratic People's Republic of Angola
- List of heads of government of Democratic People's Republic of Angola

== Sources ==
- "Countries An-Az". www.rulers.org.
- "Angola". www.worldstatesmen.org.
- Stewart, John. African States and Rulers. McFarland.
- Carpenter, Clive (1978). Guinness Book of Kings, Rulers & Statesmen. Guinness Superlatives.
- da Graca, John V. (2000). Heads of State and Government (2nd ed.). MacMillan Press.
