= Fernando José de França Dias Van-Dúnem =

Angolan politician (1934–2024)

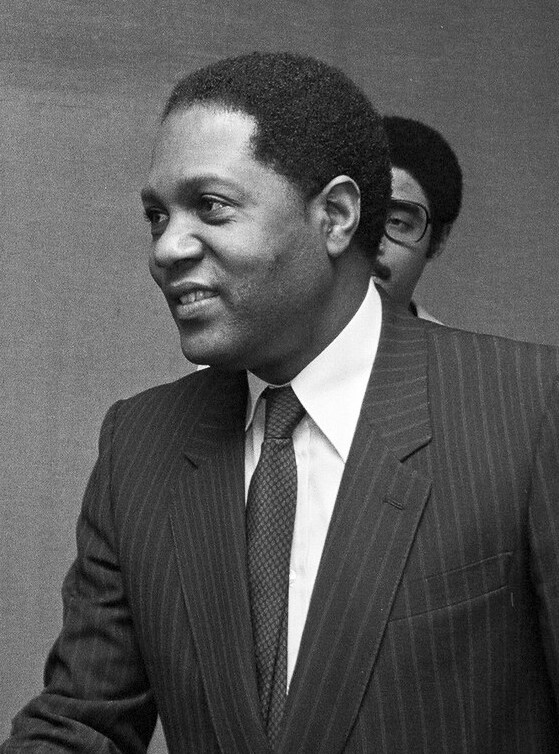
- Dias Van-Dúnem in 1980

Prime Minister of Angola
- In office 3 June 1996 – 29 January 1999
- President: José Eduardo dos Santos
- Preceded by: Marcolino Moco
- Succeeded by: Fernando da Piedade Dias dos Santos (2002)
- In office 19 July 1991 – 2 December 1992
- President: José Eduardo dos Santos
- Preceded by: Lopo do Nascimento (1978)
- Succeeded by: Marcolino Moco

President of the National Assembly
- In office 26 October 1992 – 3 June 1996
- Preceded by: José Eduardo dos Santos
- Succeeded by: Roberto Francisco de Almeida

Personal details
- Born: 24 August 1934 Luanda, Portuguese Angola
- Died: 12 June 2024 (aged 89) Lisbon, Portugal
- Party: MPLA

Fernando José de França Dias Van-Dúnem (24 August 1934 – 12 June 2024) was an Angolan politician who was the First Vice-President of the African Union's Pan-African Parliament. He was a member of the ruling Popular Movement for the Liberation of Angola (MPLA) and served as Prime Minister of Angola twice during the 1990s.

Dias Van-Dúnem was Prime Minister from June 1991 until December 1992 and was the first Prime Minister appointed since the post was abolished in 1978. After four years out of office, Dias was reappointed Prime Minister on 3 June 1996 and remained in office until a cabinet reshuffle in January 1999, when the post of Prime Minister was again eliminated.

== Education ==
Dias Van-Dúnem received a Master's Degree in Public Law, and a Ph.D. in Public Law, both in Aix-en-Provence, France.

== Early work ==
From 1964 to 1965 Dias Van-Dúnem was a research assistant for Professor Maarten Bos regarding international law at the University of Utrecht in the Netherlands In that same year he conducted a study on Recognition of States and Government. He was a member of the American Society of International Law from 1964 onwards. For three years starting in 1969 to 1971 he was a lecturer on Public International Law, Constitutional Law and Administrative Law at University of Burundi in Bujumbura, Burundi.

== International work ==
For two years starting in 1970 he was Deputy Legal Advisor to the Organisation of African Unity. From 1972 to 1978 he was Chief Personnel Officer of the same organization. For one year starting in 1978 Ambassador Van-Dúnem was OAU Deputy Representative for Political and Legal Affairs near the United Nations in Geneva, Switzerland.

From 1979 to 1982 he was Extraordinary and Plenipotentiary Ambassador of the People's Republic of Angola to Belgium, the Netherlands and the European Economic Community. For four years starting in 1982 he was Extraordinary and Plenipotentiary Ambassador of the People's Republic of Angola to Portugal and Spain.

== National service ==
From 1985 to 1986, Dias Van-Dúnem was Deputy Minister of External Relations, and from 1986 to 1990 he was Minister of Justice. He was Minister of Planning from 1990 to 1991, then Prime Minister from 1991 to 1992. After serving as President of the National Assembly of Angola from 1992 to 1996, he was Prime Minister for a second time from 1996 to 1999.

Dias Van-Dúnem was a member of the National Assembly of Angola in 1999. At the same time, he was a Professor of International Law, History of Political Thought, and a member of the Faculty of Law at Catholic University of Angola.

Dias Van-Dúnem was the 71st candidate on the MPLA's national list in the September 2008 parliamentary election. Van-Dúnem won a seat in this election, in which MPLA won an overwhelming majority.

== Death ==
Dias Van-Dúnem died in Lisbon, Portugal on 12 June 2024, at the age of 89.

== See also ==
- List of members of the Pan-African Parliament
- List of ambassadors to Belgium

Political offices
Preceded by Adriano Sebastião	Ambassador of Angola to Portugal; 1982–1985	Succeeded by Mawete João Baptista
Vacant Title last held by Lopo do Nascimento	Prime Minister of Angola; 1991–1992	Succeeded by Marcolino Moco
Preceded by Marcolino Moco	Prime Minister of Angola; 1996–1999	Vacant Title next held by Fernando da Piedade Dias dos Santos
