= List of presidents of Angola =

This article lists the presidents of Angola since the establishment of the office of president in 1975.

The current president of Angola is João Lourenço. He assumed the office on 26 September 2017.

== Presidents of Angola (1975–present) ==
| No. | Portrait | Name (Birth–Death) | Term of office | | | Political party | Election | Ref. |
| No. | Portrait | Name (Birth–Death) | Took office | Left office | Time in office | Political party | Election | Ref. |
People's Republic of Angola
| 1 | Agostinho Neto | Agostinho Neto (1922–1979) | 11 November 1975 | 10 September 1979 † | 3 years, 303 days | MPLA | — | |
| 2 | José Eduardo dos Santos | José Eduardo dos Santos (1942–2022) | 21 September 1979 | 27 August 1992 | 12 years, 341 days | MPLA | 1979; 1986 | |
Republic of Angola
| (2) | José Eduardo dos Santos | José Eduardo dos Santos (1942–2022) | 27 August 1992 | 25 September 2017 | 25 years, 29 days | MPLA | 1992; 2012 | |
| 3 | João Lourenço | João Lourenço (born 1954) | 26 September 2017 | Incumbent | 9 years, 47 days | MPLA | 2017; 2022 | |

Note: For details of the post of President of Angola, see President of Angola.

== Timeline ==
This is a graphical lifespan timeline of the presidents of Angola. They are listed in order of first assuming office.

The following chart lists presidents by lifespan (living presidents on the green line), with the years outside of their presidency in beige.

The following chart shows presidents by their age (living presidents in green), with the years of their presidency in blue. The vertical black line at 35 years indicates the minimum age to be president.

== See also ==
- President of Angola
- Vice President of Angola
- Prime Minister of Angola
  - List of prime ministers of Angola
- List of Ngolas of Ndongo
- List of colonial governors of Angola
- List of heads of state of Democratic People's Republic of Angola
- List of heads of government of Democratic People's Republic of Angola

== Sources ==
- http://www.rulers.org/rula2.html#angola
- http://www.worldstatesmen.org/Angola.html
- African States and Rulers, John Stewart, McFarland
- Guinness Book of Kings, Rulers & Statesmen, Clive Carpenter, Guinness Superlatives Ltd
- Heads of State and Government, 2nd Edition, John V da Graca, MacMillan Press 2000
