= José Ndele =

Angolan politician

José Ndele (13 August 1940 — 19 April 2000) served as Joint Prime Minister of the Democratic People's Republic of Angola, alongside Johnny Eduardo Pinnock, from 23 November 1975 to 11 February 1976. His political party was UNITA.
