= Lopo do Nascimento =

Angolan politician

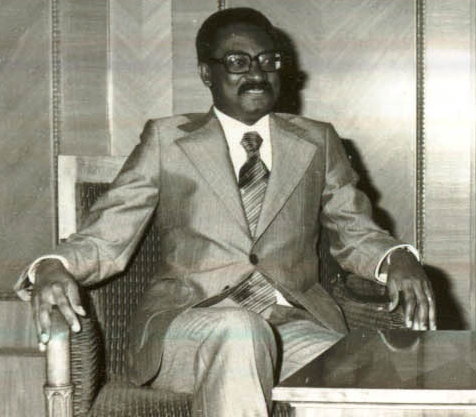
- Nascimento during an official visit to Romania in 1978

Prime Minister of Angola
- In office 11 November 1975 – 9 December 1978
- President: Agostinho Neto
- Preceded by: Office established
- Succeeded by: Fernando José de França Dias Van-Dúnem

Personal details
- Born: Lopo Fortunato Ferreira do Nascimento; 10 July 1942 (age 84) Luanda, Overseas Province of Angola, Portugal
- Party: MPLA
- Spouse: Maria do Carmo Assis do Nascimento

Lopo Fortunato Ferreira do Nascimento (born 10 July 1942) is an Angolan retired politician. He served as the first Prime Minister of Angola from 11 November 1975 to 9 December 1978 and was Secretary-General of the Popular Movement for the Liberation of Angola (MPLA).

At the age of 19, he was arrested but released with the obligation to move to Cuanza Norte. He continued in underground fighting and was arrested again in 1963. This time he went to court and was convicted. He was detained for six years in the Luanda civil prison under Portuguese administration where he was tortured and during interrogations he spent three to five days without sleep, always on his feet; after a few days, Lopo felt that his feet would almost explode and that a person would still start talking. He didn't speak. In January 1969 he left and joined the Nocal brewery. He went to Algeria, via Lisbon, at the end of 1973. He left Angola because the MPLA had many problems, especially with the Daniel Chipenda East Revolt, and they asked him to go reinforce the leadership work.

Nascimento was later Minister of Territorial Administration; after resigning from that post, he was replaced by Paulo Kassoma on 9 April 1992. He was elected as MPLA Secretary-General by the party's Central Committee in 1993.

He was the 66th candidate on the MPLA's national list in the September 2008 legislative election. He won a seat in that election, in which MPLA won an overwhelming majority in the National Assembly.

On 27 January 2013 he announced his retirement from active politics. On February 10, 2021, he was hospitalized for COVID-19. He subsequently recovered from the illness.

Political offices
Preceded by Position established	Prime Minister of Angola; 1975–1978	Succeeded by Position abolished
Preceded by Paulino Pinto João	Minister of Domestic Trade; 1977–1979	Succeeded by Florêncio Gamaliel Gaspar
Preceded by Roberto A.V. Francisco de Almeida	Minister of Foreign Trade; 1979–1982	Succeeded by Ismael Martins
Preceded by Roberto A.V. Francisco de Almeida	Minister of Planning; 1981–1986	Succeeded by António Henriques da Silva
Preceded by Rafael Sapilinha Sambalanga	Provincial Commissioner of Huíla; 1986-1990	Succeeded by Dumilde das Chagas Rangel
Preceded by	Minister of Territory Administration; 1991–1992	Succeeded by António Paulo Cassoma
