= President of Angola =

Head of state and government

President of Republic of Angola
- Presidente de Angola (Portuguese)
- Presidential flag

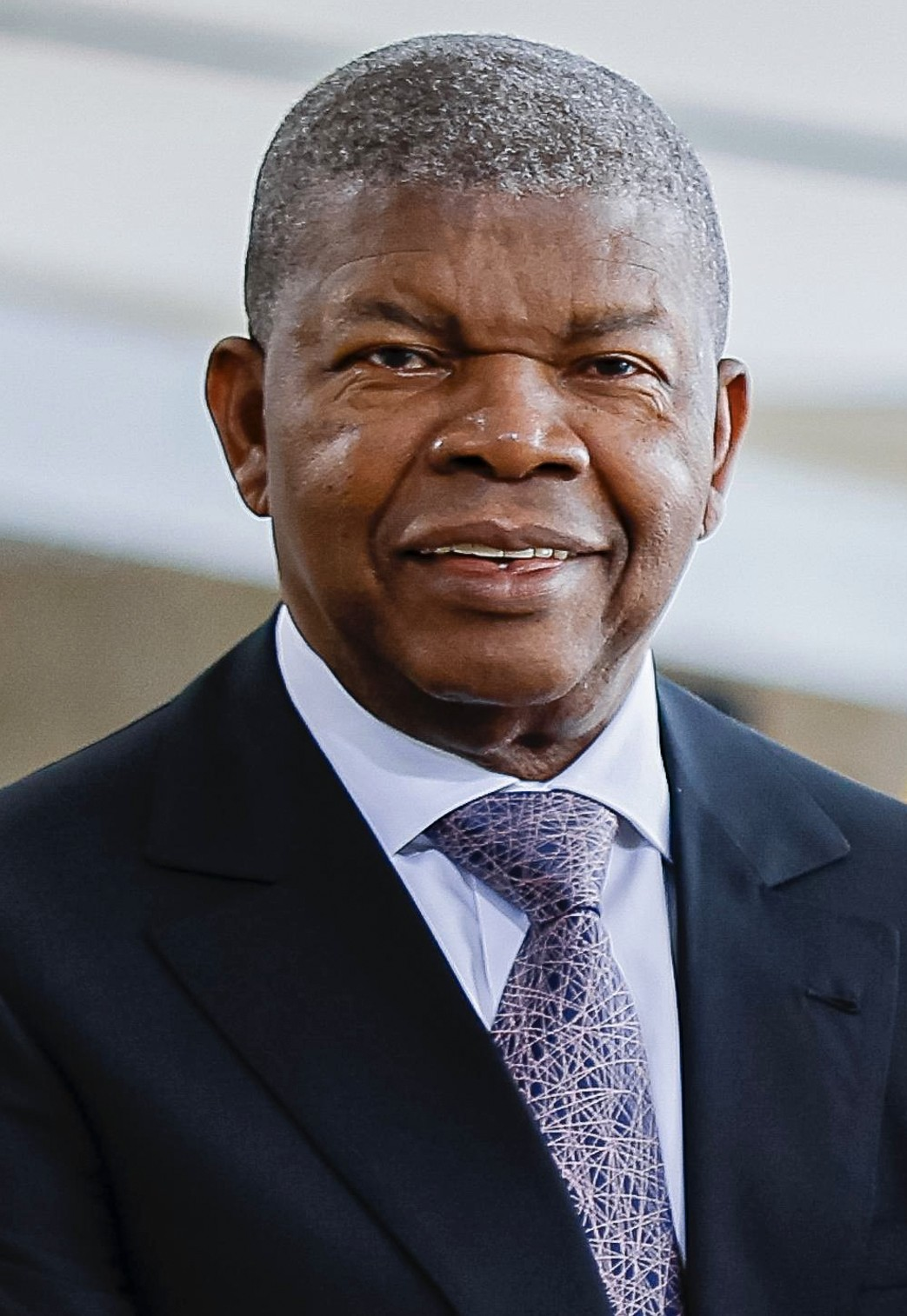
- Incumbent; João Lourenço since 26 September 2017
- Term length: Five years, renewable once
- Constituting instrument: Constitution of Angola (2010)
- Precursor: Colonial governor of Angola
- Formation: 11 November 1975; 50 years ago
- First holder: Agostinho Neto
- Deputy: Vice President of Angola
- Salary: Kz 640,100/US$ 1,263 monthly
- Website: https://governo.gov.ao/ao/

The president of Angola (Portuguese: Presidente de Angola) is both head of state and head of government in Angola. According to the constitution adopted in 2010, the post of prime minister is abolished; executive authority belongs to the president who has also a degree of legislative power, as he can govern by decree. The president is also the Commander-in-Chief of the armed forces.

The position of president dates from Angola's independence from Portugal. Agostinho Neto obtained the position when his People's Movement for the Liberation of Angola (MPLA) won control of the country from the Portuguese. When Neto died in 1979, José Eduardo dos Santos succeeded him.

Under Dos Santos' leadership, Angola became a multi-party state, although it remained controlled by him. The election held in 1992 reelected Dos Santos with 49% of the votes. His opponent, Jonas Savimbi of the National Union for Total Independence of Angola (UNITA) party, claimed that the election was fraudulent.

As of 2025, there is a two-term limit for the president in the Constitution of Angola. The term limit has been met for the first time in 2022, when President Lourenço was re-elected.

Per the current constitution enacted in 2010, the Angolan president is elected by double simultaneous first-past-the-post voting for a five-year term by the National Assembly, renewable once. Each participating party nominates a candidate as top of its list, who must be clearly identified on the ballot paper. The candidate of the party gathering the most votes is elected president. The new constitution limits a president to serving two terms, although it does not count the terms already served at the date of entry into force of the constitution, and abolishes the post of prime minister, instead introducing the post of vice-president.

João Lourenço is the current incumbent. He assumed office on 26 September 2017.

== See also ==
- Vice President of Angola
- Prime Minister of Angola

=== Relevant lists ===
General

- Lists of incumbents
- List of national leaders

Angola

- List of colonial governors of Angola
- List of prime ministers of Angola
- List of heads of state of Democratic People's Republic of Angola
- List of heads of government of Democratic People's Republic of Angola
