= José Eduardo dos Santos =

President of Angola from 1979 to 2017

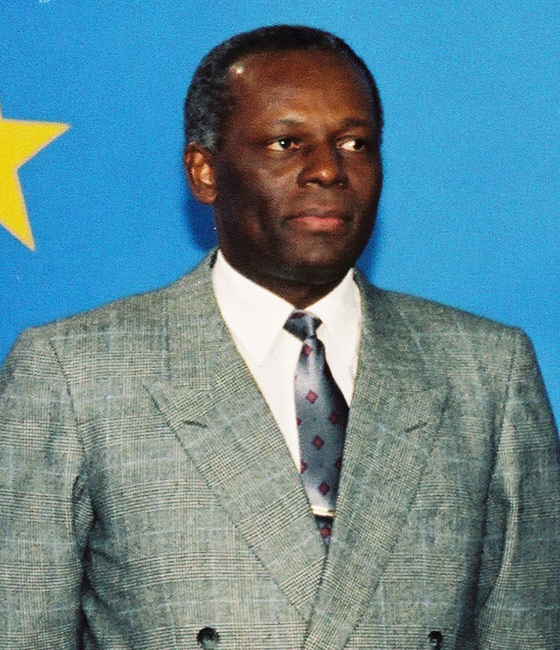
- dos Santos in 1991

2nd President of Angola
- In office 21 September 1979 – 26 September 2017
- Prime Minister: See list: Fernando José de França Dias Van-Dúnem; Marcolino Moco; Fernando da Piedade Dias dos Santos; Paulo Kassoma
- Vice President: Fernando da Piedade Dias dos Santos (2010–2012); Manuel Vicente (2012–2017)
- Preceded by: Agostinho Neto
- Succeeded by: João Lourenço

Commander of the People's Armed Forces of Liberation of Angola
- In office 21 September 1979 – 9 October 1991
- Preceded by: Agostinho Neto
- Succeeded by: Office abolished

Personal details
- Born: 28 August 1942 Luanda, Portuguese Angola
- Died: 8 July 2022 (aged 79) Barcelona, Spain
- Party: MPLA (1958–2022)
- Spouses: Tatiana Kukanova (m. 1966; div. 1980); Ana Paula Lemos (m. 1991)
- Children: Isabel, José and Jose Manuel Gomes dos Santos
- Education: Azerbaijan State Oil Academy

Military service
- Allegiance: Angola
- Branch/service: FAPLA/EPLA (1962–1991); FAA/EXE (1991–2002)
- Years of service: 1962–2002
- Rank: Army general (1986)
- Battles/wars: Angolan War of Independence; Angolan Civil War; First Congo War

José Eduardo Van-Dúnem dos Santos (Portuguese pronunciation: [ʒuˈzɛ eˈðwaɾðu ðuʃ ˈsɐ̃tuʃ]; 28 August 1942 – 8 July 2022) was an Angolan politician and military officer who served as the second president of Angola from 1979 to 2017. As president, dos Santos was also the commander-in-chief of the Angolan Armed Forces (FAA) and president of the People's Movement for the Liberation of Angola (MPLA), the party that has ruled Angola since it won independence in 1975. By the time he stepped down in 2017, he was the second-longest-serving president in Africa, surpassed only by Teodoro Obiang Nguema Mbasogo of Equatorial Guinea.

Dos Santos joined the MPLA, then an anti-colonial movement, while still in school, and earned degrees in petroleum engineering and radar communications while studying in the Soviet Union. Following the Angolan War of Independence, Angola was constituted in 1975 as a Marxist–Leninist one-party state led by the MPLA. Dos Santos held several positions, including Minister of Foreign Affairs in the government of independent Angola's first president, Agostinho Neto.

After Neto's death in 1979, dos Santos was elected by the MPLA as the country's new president, supported by the Soviet Union and inheriting a civil war against Western-backed anti-communist rebels, most notably UNITA. By 1991, his government agreed with rebels to introduce a multi-party system, while changing the MPLA's ideology from communism to social democracy. He was elected president in the 1992 Angolan general election over UNITA leader Jonas Savimbi, and presided over free-market economic liberalisation and the development of Angola's oil sector. In 1997, he contributed to a rebel invasion of neighboring Zaire during the First Congo War, leading to the overthrow of Congolese UNITA ally Mobutu Sese Seko and the installation of Laurent-Désiré Kabila as President of the Democratic Republic of the Congo later that year. During the Second Congo War from 1998 to 2003, he supported Kabila's government and later that of his son Joseph against several rebel groups loosely allied with UNITA. The MPLA achieved victory in the civil war by 2002 following Savimbi's death. After winning a second presidential term in the 2012 election, he retired from the presidency in 2017, succeeded by party-mate João Lourenço as president.

A controversial figure, dos Santos received many international awards for his commitment to anti-colonialism and promotion of peace negotiations with rebels to end wars, and was praised for attracting significant foreign investment to Angola's economy. He was criticised as having been a dictator and was accused of creating one of the most corrupt regimes in Africa, with a deeply-entrenched patronage network.

== Early life and education ==
José Eduardo Van-Dúnem dos Santos was born on 28 August 1942 in what is today the district of Sambizanga in Luanda, His parents, Avelino Eduardo dos Santos and Jacinta José Paulino, had moved to Portuguese Angola from the then-colony of Portuguese São Tomé and Príncipe. His mother was a maid, while his father was a builder and construction worker. His eldest sister, Isabel Eduardo dos Santos raised Manuel Vicente, under Dos Santos later Vice President of Angola. Dos Santos' cousin Fernando da Piedade Dias dos Santos was prime minister of Angola from 2002 to 2008.

He attended primary school in Luanda, and received his secondary education at the Liceu Salvador Correia, today called Mutu ya Kevela.

While in school, dos Santos joined the MPLA, which marked the beginning of his political career. Due to repression by the colonial government, dos Santos went into exile in neighbouring Congo-Brazzaville in 1961. From there, he collaborated with the MPLA and soon became an official member of the party.

To continue with his education he moved to Azerbaijan, which was Azerbaijan Soviet Socialist Republic within the Soviet Union, where, by 1969, he received degrees in petroleum engineering and radar communications from the Azerbaijan Oil and Chemistry Institute in Baku.

== Career ==
In 1970, dos Santos returned to Angola, which was still a Portuguese territory known as the Overseas Province of Angola. He served for three years in the MPLA's EPLA guerrilla force (Exército Para a Libertação de Angola), later known as the People's Armed Forces for the Liberation of Angola (FAPLA), the military wing of the MPLA, becoming a radio transmitter in the second political-military region of the MPLA in Cabinda Province. In 1974, he was promoted to sub-commander of the telecoms service of the second region. He was the MPLA representative to Yugoslavia, Zaire, and the People's Republic of China before he was elected to the Central Committee and Politburo of the MPLA in Moxico in September 1974.

=== Early political positions, 1975-1979 ===
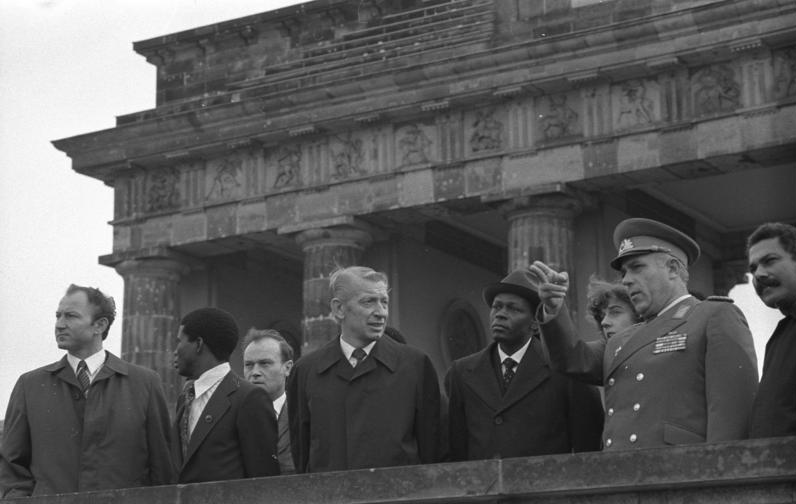
Dos Santos (fifth from the left) at the Brandenburg Gate during a 1981 state visit, with East German officials

In June 1975, dos Santos became coordinator of the MPLA's Department of Foreign Affairs and of the MPLA's Department of Health. Upon Angolan independence in November 1975, the MPLA held power in Luanda, but the new MPLA government faced a civil war with the other political formations, the National Union for the Total Independence of Angola (UNITA) and the National Liberation Front of Angola (FNLA). The same year, dos Santos was appointed as Angola's first Minister of Foreign Affairs upon independence, and in this capacity he played a key role in obtaining diplomatic recognition for the MPLA government in 1975–1976. At the MPLA's First Congress in December 1977, dos Santos was re-elected to the Central Committee and Politburo. In December 1978, he was moved from the post of First Deputy Prime Minister in the government to that of Minister of Planning.

After the natural death of Angola's first president, Agostinho Neto, on 10 September 1979, dos Santos was elected president of the MPLA on 20 September 1979, and took office as President of Angola and Commander-in-Chief of the Armed Forces on 21 September. In the first Angolan parliamentary election on 9 November 1980, he was elected President of the People's Assembly of Angola as a one-party state.

=== Peace process, 1980-2002 ===
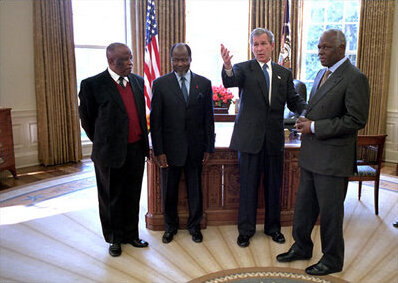
George W. Bush hosts Festus Mogae of Botswana, Joaquim Chissano of Mozambique, and José Eduardo dos Santos in 2002

The biggest issue dos Santos had to cope with was the ongoing conflict with the main rival liberation movement, the National Union for the Total Integration of Angola (UNITA). UNITA, led by Jonas Savimbi and supported by South Africa and the United States, never fully recognized the legitimacy of MPLA as the ruling government of Angola and triggered several armed conflicts over the years to express its opposition. The war was also marked by intense foreign intervention, since the Soviet Union and Cuba backed the MPLA government and the U.S. and South Africa supported UNITA as a way to limit the expansion of Soviet influence in Africa. From 1989 until 1991, the United Nations Angola Verification Mission I and from 1991 until 1995, the United Nations Angola Verification Mission II took place.

On 29 and 30 September 1992, after 16 years of fighting that killed up to 300,000 people, general elections were held in Angola, under United Nations supervision. Dos Santos led the field in the first round with 49%; his main rival, Jonas Savimbi, won 40%. Under a constitution adopted earlier that year, since dos Santos finished just short of an outright majority, he would need to win a runoff election against Savimbi to become Angola's first constitutional president. This second round never took place, as UNITA declared it did not recognize the election.

A three-day war ensued, during which the Halloween Massacre occurred, when MPLA forces killed tens of thousands of UNITA protestors nationwide. Savimbi then decided to give up on the elections, alleging voting fraud, and immediately resumed the civil war. Meanwhile, dos Santos remained in office.

In 1993, while Savimbi and UNITA refused to give up territory won through battle, the United States, involved in settling peace talks between the two rival parties and leaders in order to work out a power sharing arrangement, decided to withdraw its support from UNITA and officially recognize dos Santos and the MPLA government as the official ruling body in Angola.

The death of UNITA's leader, Jonas Savimbi, in February 2002 enabled the resumption of the peace process. On 4 April 2002, the Angolan Army and the rebels agreed to a ceasefire and peace was officially declared on 2 August 2002. While recognized as an official political party by the Angolan government, UNITA agreed to demobilize its armed forces, made up of 50,000 fighters, and agreed for them to be integrated into the national security forces. Following that decision, the UN Security Council reopened United Nations offices in Angola and established the United Nations Mission in Angola (UNMA), aimed at consolidating peace in the country.

=== Governance issues after end of civil war 2001-2016 ===
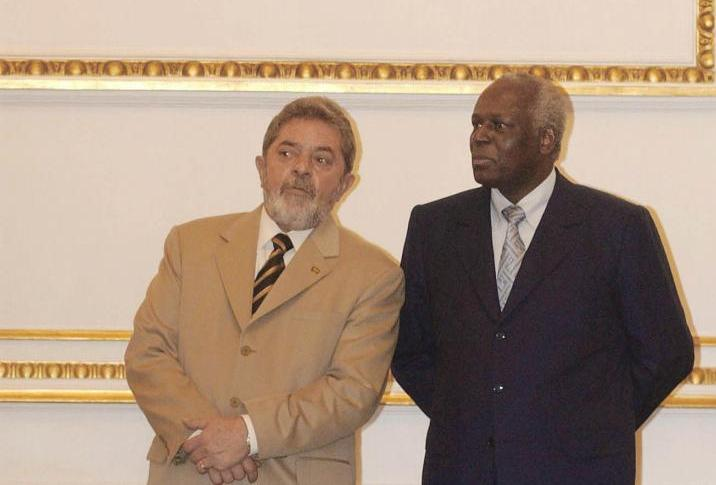
Dos Santos in 2003 with the president of Brazil, Lula da Silva

In 2001, dos Santos announced that he would step down at the next presidential election. In December 2003, he was reelected as head of the MPLA and no further presidential election took place, despite their announcements for 2006, then 2007, and finally 2009. In August 2006, he obtained a MoU with the Front for the Liberation of the Enclave of Cabinda.

After the 2008 Angolan parliamentary election, the ruling MPLA won a landslide victory, and it started working on a new constitution, which was introduced early in 2010. Under the terms of the new constitution, the president is elected by first-past-the-post double simultaneous vote for the same term as the assembly, and may serve a maximum of two terms. Each participating party nominates a presidential candidate as top of its list, who must be clearly identified on the ballot paper. The top candidate of the party receiving the most votes is elected president.

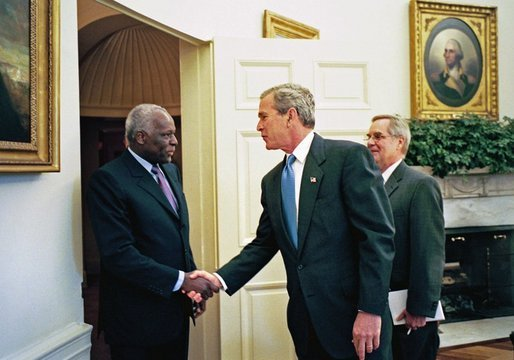
President of the United States George W. Bush welcomes President dos Santos to the Oval Office, 2004.

Dos Santos reportedly escaped an assassination attempt on 24 October 2010, when a vehicle tried to intercept his car as he was returning from the beach with his family. His escort opened fire, killing two passengers in the vehicle, and weapons were found on board. This incident has not been confirmed by any other source. In February–March 2011, and then again in September 2011, demonstrations against dos Santos were organized in Luanda by young Angolans, mostly via the Internet.

In the 2012 legislative election, his party, the MPLA, won more than two-thirds of the vote. As dos Santos had been the top candidate of the party, he automatically became president, in line with the constitution adopted in 2010.

In September 2014, dos Santos announced the end of the coupling of the position of provincial governor with provincial first secretary of the MPLA. This measure aimed to improve the operation of the provincial administration and the municipal administrations, as a way to adjust the governance model to a new context and bigger demand for public services.

=== Economy ===
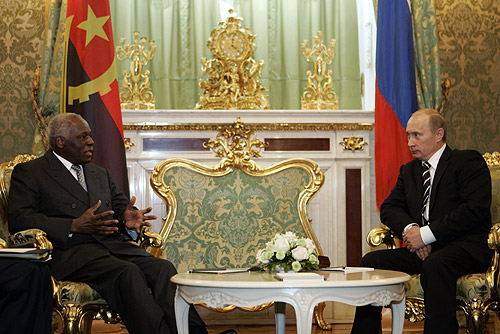
Dos Santos with Vladimir Putin during a meeting in 2006

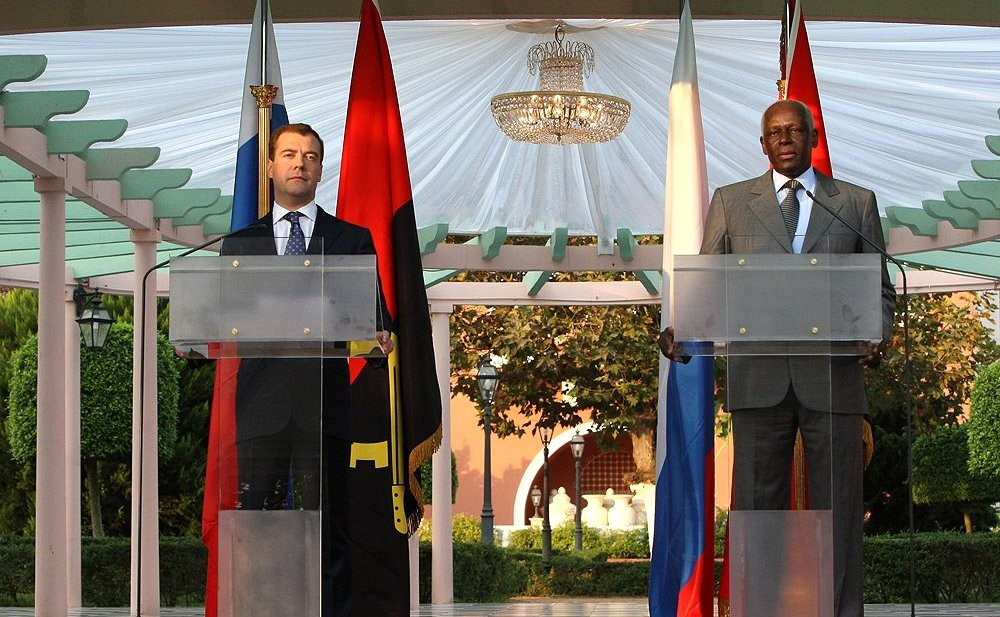
Dos Santos with Russian president Dmitry Medvedev whilst the latter was on a state visit to Angola in 2009

Once a Marxist-Leninist, dos Santos allowed a partial market economy to emerge as the collapse of the Soviet Union was in progress. Dos Santos subsequently abandoned Marxism-Leninism completely and allowed Western firms to invest in Angola's major oil fields. Angola became Africa's second-largest oil producer and third-largest diamond producer during dos Santos' tenure in office. In November 2006, dos Santos co-founded the African Countries Diamond Producers Association, an organisation of approximately 20 African nations founded to promote market cooperation and foreign investment in the African diamond industry.

Despite the country's natural resources, most Angolans remained in poverty: At the time of dos Santos' death in 2022, a few years after he left office, more than half of the more than 30 million Angolans subsisted on less than US$1.90 a day. Dos Santos oversaw a kleptocracy with vast amounts of wealth diverted to the dos Santos family; In 2020, dos Santos's successor, João Lourenço, estimated that more than $24 billion was stolen or misappropriated under dos Santos, allegedly through diversion of oil revenue, patronage, and government contracts.

=== Succession, 2016-2017 ===
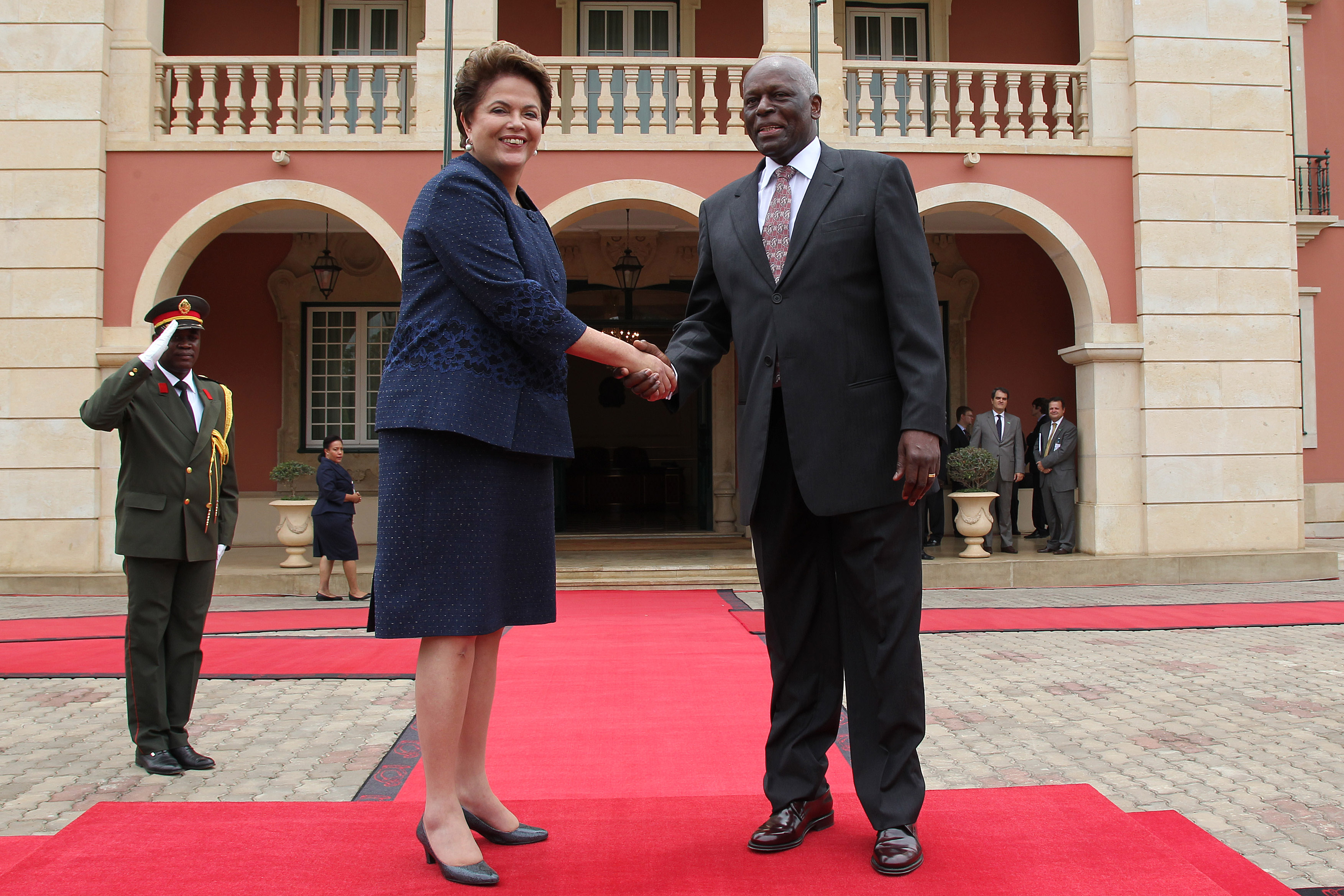
President of Brazil Dilma Rousseff meets José Eduardo dos Santos at the Presidential Palace in Luanda, 2011

Dos Santos announced on 11 March 2016 that he planned to retire in 2018. This timetable would mean that he would leave office after the next election, scheduled for 2017. In December 2016, the MPLA chose João Lourenço, the Minister of Defense and Vice-President of the MPLA, as the party's top candidate and therefore its presidential candidate for the 2017 legislative election, indicating that dos Santos would step aside prior to 2018. Dos Santos stated on 3 February 2017 that he would leave office following the election later in 2017, with Lourenço slated to succeed him. He remained President of the MPLA and was therefore expected to continue playing a key role at the top of Angolan politics through the leadership of the ruling party. His children Isabel dos Santos and José Filomeno dos Santos held key economic posts at Sonangol and the Fundo Soberano de Angola, respectively, suggesting their father retained considerable influence.

=== Controversial issues ===
Dos Santos led one of the most corrupt regimes in Africa by ignoring the economic and social needs of Angola and focusing his efforts on amassing wealth for his family and silencing his opposition, while nearly 70% of the population lived on less than $2 a day.

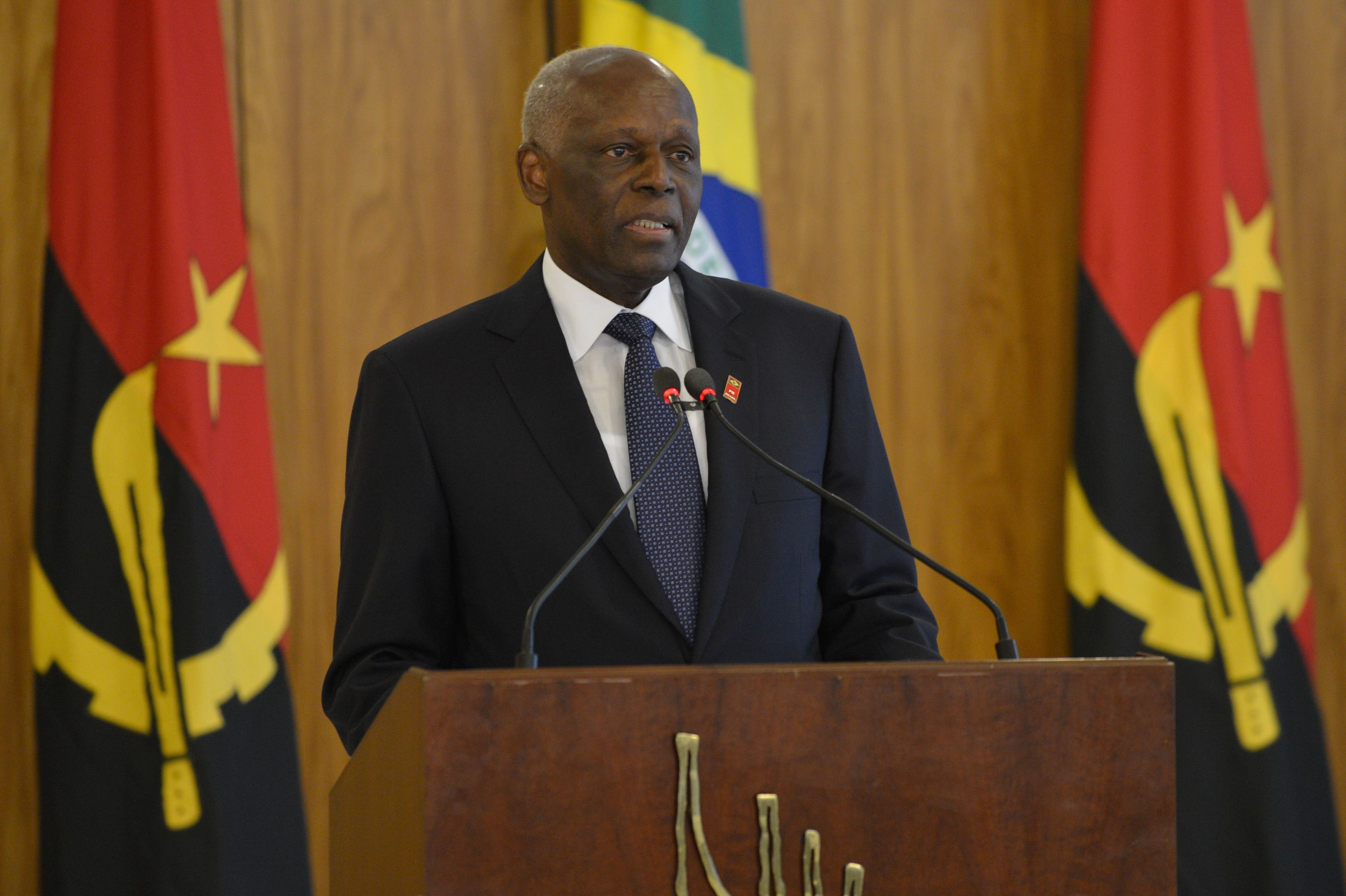
Dos Santos speaking in 2014

Dos Santos became wealthy when he first took power, and began amassing larger assets during and after the Angolan civil wars. When the ceasefire occurred and large portions of the economy were partially privatized, he took several emerging companies and industries. He helped arrange similar takeovers of several other natural resource industries. According to Transparency International, Angola had a reputation as one of the world's most corrupt countries by the end of Dos Santos' reign.

Eventually the Angolan Parliament made it illegal for the president to have financial holdings in companies and organizations. In response to this, dos Santos supposedly began arranging for his daughter to receive the financial kickbacks and assets from these companies. Dos Santos then began using the government to take direct control of stakes in companies offered as kickbacks, which he indirectly controlled and reaped the benefits of and managed to retain large corporate assets through proxies.

In what has become known as the Luanda Leaks, a vast network of more than 400 banks, companies, and consultants was revealed to have engaged in money laundering for the dos Santos family. Among others, these include firms such as Banco BIC, founded by dos Santos family billionaire associate Américo Amorim, Boston Consulting Group, McKinsey & Company, PwC, Eurobic, and a shell company called Athol Limited. According to Angolan media reports, Brave Ventures, a firm run by Swiss art dealer Yves Bouvier, was also implicated in money-laundering activities in its role as a subcontractor for a French consulting firm tasked by dos Santos to oversee the development of the public health system.

Along with this, the government budget had grown over a decade to 69 billion dollars in 2012 through oil revenues. The International Monetary Fund reported that 32 billion in oil revenue went missing from the government's ledger before it was found spent on "quasi-fiscal activities".

== Personal life and death ==
Dos Santos, apart from Portuguese, was also fluent in Spanish, French, and Russian, and amassed a significant personal fortune.

=== Marriages and relationships, the dos Santos clan ===
José Eduardo dos Santos was married at least twice, and possibly as many as four marriages, depending on the source. He had at least six children from his wives, and one born out of wedlock.

His first wife was the Russian-born geologist Tatiana Kukanova, whom he met while studying in the Azerbaijan Soviet Socialist Republic (present-day Azerbaijan). Dos Santos and Kukanova had one daughter, Isabel dos Santos (b. 1973), who was at one time the richest woman in Africa. Their marriage ended in divorce.

His next two marriages (or long-term relationships, depending on the source) also ended in divorce or separation as well. With his second wife, Filomena Sousa, he had one child, José Filomeno dos Santos, known as "Zenú" (b. 1978), who served as chairman of Fundo Soberano de Angola.

His third wife was Maria Luísa Abrantes Perdigão. They had a daughter, Welwitschia "Tchize" dos Santos (b. 1978), and a son, Angolan artist Coréon Dú (b. 1984). Maria Luísa Abrantes served as Minister of Finance from June 1990 to April 1992.

In 1991, dos Santos married his fourth and final wife, Ana Paula de Lemos, a former flight attendant and model. They had three children: Eduane Danilo (b. 1991), Joseana (b. 1995), and Eduardo (b. 1998). The couple remained married until his death in 2022. As of 2017, Eduane Danilo was a partner in an Angolan financial institution named Banco Postal, holding stock in a private holding company called ‘Deana Day Spa’ and was entrusted with the privatization of Angola Telecom.

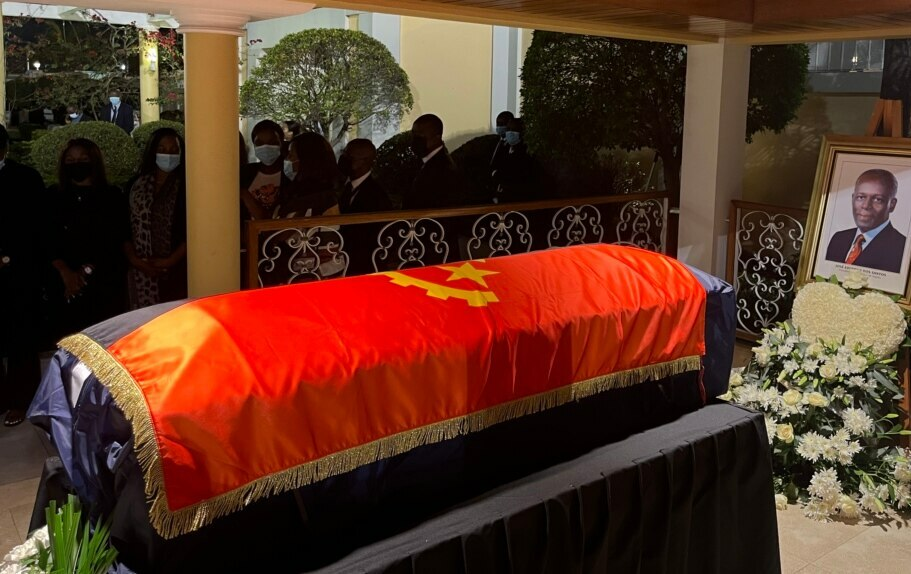
Coffin of dos Santos prior to his burial

=== Later life ===
Dos Santos had cancer for several years prior to his death. In mid-2017, he twice travelled to Barcelona, Spain, on weeks-long visits that were rumoured to be related to a medical problem. The government acknowledged that the first visit was related to his health. No official explanation was given for his second visit, from 3 to 19 July. He suffered cardiorespiratory arrest on 23 June 2022 and had also tested positive for COVID-19. He died on 8 July 2022, at Teknon Medical Centre in Barcelona, at the age of 79. A Spanish court agreed to repatriate his body and awarded custody of his body to his widow a month later.

He was given a state funeral in the Angolan capital, Luanda, with several African leaders and Portugal's president present on 28 August 2022.

== Awards and recognitions ==
- Angola:
  - Dr António Agostinho Neto Order
- Cuba:
  - Order of José Martí
- Portugal:
  - Grand Collar of the Military Order of Saint James of the Sword
  - Grand Collar of the Order of Prince Henry
- Russia:
  - Order of Friendship
  - Order of Honour
- Serbia:
  - Order of the Republic of Serbia, 2nd class
- South Africa:
  - Order of the Companions of O. R. Tambo

Dos Santos was praised for the major role he played in favour of the country's independence and his commitment to the promotion of peace and democracy in the country, through negotiations with opposition movements designed to put a definite end to the civil war. He received the Order of the Companions of O. R. Tambo in 2010. He also received an honorary diploma of the National Commission on Racial Justice of the United Church of Christ (USA).

Dos Santos was named "Man of the Year 2014" by Africa World. According to the newspaper, the choice of the Angolan leader was due to his contribution to the great process of economic and democratic recovery of Angola since the end of the war.

A University of Namibia Engineering and Information Technology campus in Ongwediva is named after dos Santos, who was himself an engineer by profession, for assisting Namibia with attaining its freedom from oppression. Portugal awarded dos Santos the Grand Collar of the Order of Prince Henry in 1988 and the Grand Collar of the Military Order of Saint James of the Sword in 1996.

== See also ==
- List of current Angolan ministers
- List of heads of state of Angola
- Leopoldino Fragoso do Nascimento embezzled billions from the Angolan government
- Hélder Vieira Dias

Military offices
Preceded by Agostinho Neto	Commander-in-chief of the People's Armed Forces of Liberation of Angola; 21 September 1979 – 9 October 1991	Office abolished
Party political offices
Preceded by Agostinho Neto	President of the People's Movement for the Liberation of Angola; 21 September 1979 – 10 September 2018	Succeeded by João Lourenço
Political offices
New office	Minister of External Relations; 12 November 1975 – 17 March 1976	Succeeded by Paulo Teixeira Jorge
Preceded by Agostinho Neto	President of Angola; 21 September 1979 – 25 September 2017	Succeeded by João Lourenço
New office	President of the People's Assembly; 9 November 1980 – 26 October 1992	Succeeded by Fernando José de França Dias Van-Dúnem as President of the National Assembly
Preceded by Paulo Teixeira Jorge	Minister of External Relations; 20 October 1984 – 23 March 1985	Succeeded by Afonso Van-Dunem
