= Prime Minister of Angola =

Former governmental position

Prime Minister of the Republic of Angola
- Emblem of Angola
- Appointer: President of the Republic of Angola
- Formation: 14 November 1975
- First holder: Lopo do Nascimento
- Final holder: Paulo Kassoma
- Abolished: 4 February 2010
- Succession: Vice President of Angola

The prime minister of Angola was a high government official in Angola re-established by Angola's 1992 constitution with limited powers as deputy head of government. The position was abolished by the 2010 constitution.

Along with the rest of the Council of Ministers, the prime minister was appointed by the president. The position was originally created when Angola achieved independence from Portugal on 11 November 1975, but was abolished in 1978 when President Agostinho Neto consolidated his power. There was no prime minister until 1991, when President José Eduardo dos Santos reinstated the position following a peace agreement with the opposition party.

Under the 1992 constitution, the position of prime minister was introduced as part of the Executive Branch. The prime minister was appointed by the president, with consultation from the legislature. The prime minister could be dismissed by the president. The prime minister's role, as laid out by the 1992 constitution, was to "direct, conduct and coordinate the general activity of the Government", and reported to the president.

The post was vacant between 1999 and 2002.

The post was again abolished in the 2010 constitution, which the replaced the prime minister position with a vice-president instead. The functions of the prime minister were integrated into the office of the president, who is appointed via the legislative elections, but is not subject to the confidence of the parliamentary majority like a prime minister is.

== See also ==
- List of current Angolan ministers
