= 8th CPLP Summit =

8th biennial meeting of heads of government

VIII Conference of Heads of State & Government of the CPLP 8th CPLP Summit
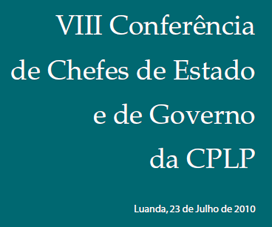
- The 8th CPLP Summit; Luanda, .
- Host country: Angola
- Dates: 23 July 2010
- Cities: Luanda
- Follows: 7th CPLP Summit
- Precedes: 9th CPLP Summit
- Website: VIII Conferência de Chefes de Estado e de Governo da CPLP

The VIII Conference of Heads of State and Government of the CPLP (Portuguese: VIII Conferência de Chefes de Estado e de Governo da CPLP), commonly known as the 8th CPLP Summit (V Cimeira da CPLP) was the 8th biennial meeting of heads of state and heads of government of the Community of Portuguese Language Countries, held in Luanda, Angola, on 23 July 2010.

== Outcome ==
The theme of the 8th CPLP Summit was "Solidarity in Diversity in the Space of the CPLP", centered on the importance of defense cooperation and the promotion of the Portuguese language.

=== Executive Secretary ===
Domingos Simões Pereira, former Prime Minister of Guinea-Bissau, was elected as the Executive Secretary of the Community of Portuguese Language Countries, succeeding Cabo Verdian diplomat Luís de Matos Monteiro da Fonseca in the position.
