= 9th CPLP Summit =

IX Conference of Heads of State & Government of the CPLP 9th CPLP Summit
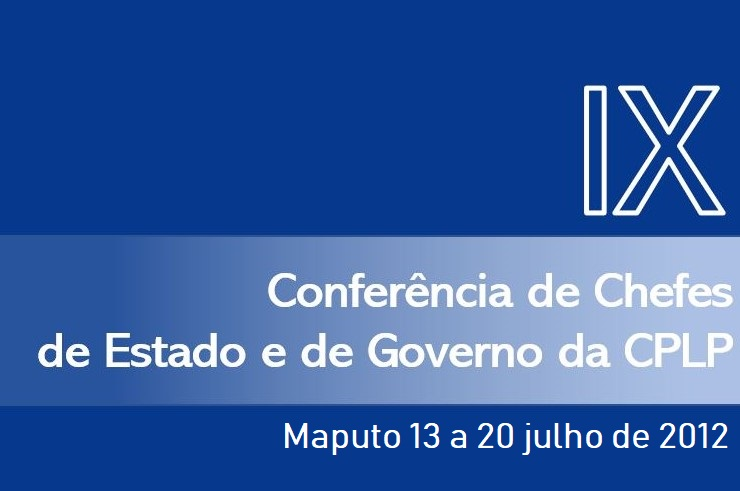
- The 9th CPLP Summit; Maputo, .
- Host country: Mozambique
- Dates: 13-20 July 2012
- Cities: Maputo
- Follows: 8th CPLP Summit
- Precedes: 10th CPLP Summit
- Website: IX Conferência de Chefes de Estado e de Governo da CPLP

The IX Conference of Heads of State and Government of the CPLP (Portuguese: IX Conferência de Chefes de Estado e de Governo da CPLP), commonly known as the 9th CPLP Summit (IX Cimeira da CPLP) was the 9th biennial meeting of heads of state and heads of government of the Community of Portuguese Language Countries, held in Maputo, Mozambique, on 13-20 July 2012.

== Outcome ==
The theme of the 9th CPLP Summit was "Nutritional and Alimentary Security and the CPLP", centered on the importance of food security and nutrition.

=== Executive Secretary ===
Mozambican diplomat Murade Isaac Murargy was elected as the Executive Secretary of the Community of Portuguese Language Countries, succeeding Domingos Simões Pereira, former Prime Minister of Guinea-Bissau, in the position.
