= 11th CPLP Summit =

XI Conference of Heads of State & Government of the CPLP 11th CPLP Summit
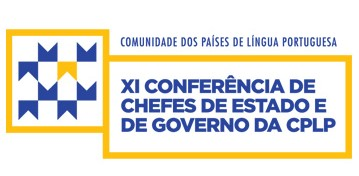
- The 11th CPLP Summit; Brasília.
- Host country: Brazil
- Dates: 31 October-1 November 2016
- Cities: Brasília
- Follows: 10th CPLP Summit
- Precedes: 12th CPLP Summit
- Website: XI Conferência de Chefes de Estado e de Governo da CPLP

The XI Conference of Heads of State and Government of the CPLP (Portuguese: XI Conferência de Chefes de Estado e de Governo da CPLP), commonly known as the 11th CPLP Summit (XI Cimeira da CPLP) was the 11th biennial meeting of heads of state and heads of government of the Community of Portuguese Language Countries, held in Brasília, Brazil, on 31 October-1 November 2016.

== Outcome ==
During the 11th Summit, the CPLP adopted its "New Strategic Vision 2016-2026" (Nova Visão Estratégica da CPLP), orienting the organization to promote greater political and diplomatic cooperation amongst member states and a greater emphasis on the diffusion of the Portuguese language as an economic, cultural, and political language within the international community,

=== Executive Secretary ===
Mozambican diplomat Murade Isaac Murargy was reelected as the Executive Secretary of the Community of Portuguese Language Countries. He was later substituted half-way through his third term by Maria do Carmo Silveira, former Prime Minister of São Tomé and Príncipe.
