= 12th CPLP Summit =

XII Conference of Heads of State & Government of the CPLP 12th CPLP Summit
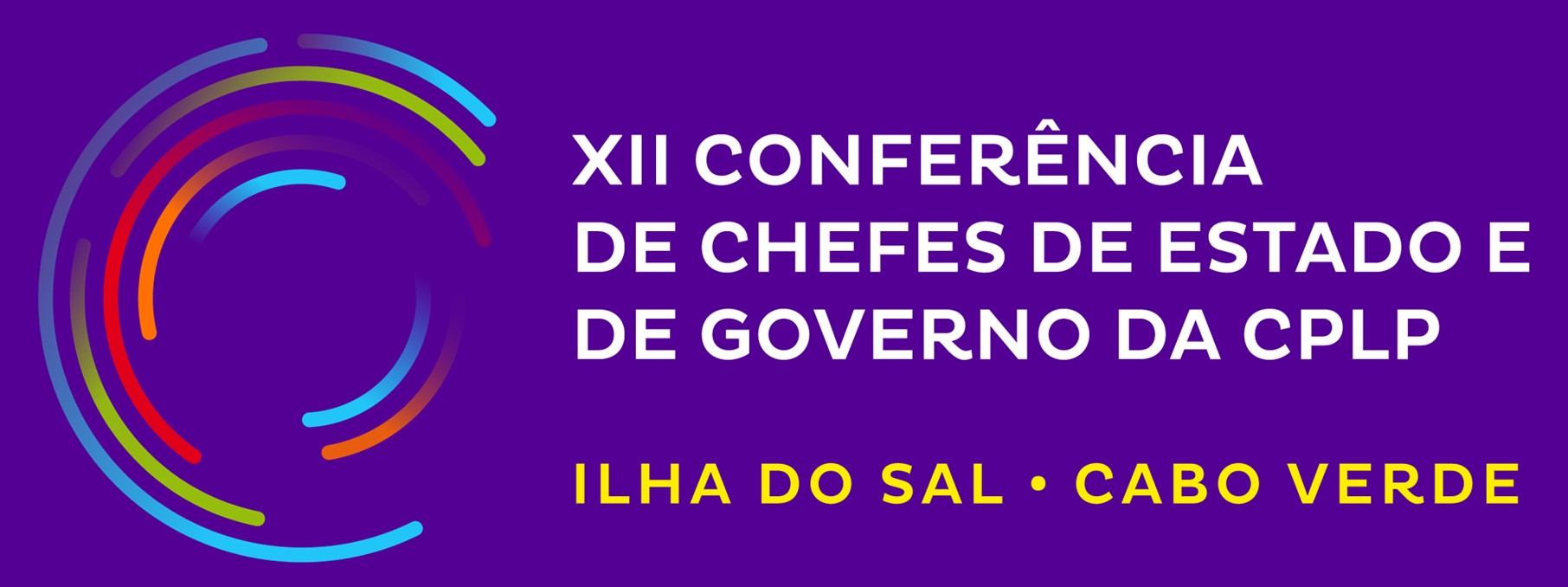
- The 12th CPLP Summit; Ilha do Sal, 2018.
- Host country: Cape Verde
- Dates: 17–18 July 2018
- Cities: Ilha do Sal
- Follows: 11th CPLP Summit
- Precedes: 13th CPLP Summit
- Website: www.cimeiracplp.cv

The XII Conference of Heads of State and Government of the CPLP (Portuguese: Conferência de Chefes de Estado e de Governo da CPLP), commonly known as the 12th CPLP Summit (VII Cimeira da CPLP) was the 12th biennial meeting of heads of state and heads of government of the Community of Portuguese Language Countries, held on the Ilha do Sal, in Cabo Verde, on 17–18 July 2018.

== Outcome ==
The summit elected Ambassador Francisco Ribeiro Telles of Portugal to serve as CPLP Executive Secretary.
