= 5th CPLP Summit =

V Conference of Heads of State & Government of the CPLP 5th CPLP Summit
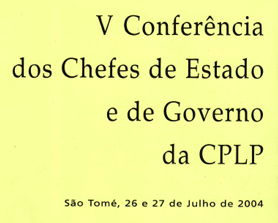
- The 5th CPLP Summit; São Tomé, .
- Host country: São Tomé and Príncipe
- Dates: 26-27 July 2004
- Cities: São Tomé
- Follows: 4th CPLP Summit
- Precedes: 6th CPLP Summit
- Website: V Conferência de Chefes de Estado e de Governo da CPLP

The V Conference of Heads of State and Government of the CPLP (Portuguese: V Conferência de Chefes de Estado e de Governo da CPLP), commonly known as the 5th CPLP Summit (V Cimeira da CPLP) was the 5th biennial meeting of heads of state and heads of government of the Community of Portuguese Language Countries, held in Brasília, Brazil, on 26-27 July 2004.

== Outcome ==
Equatorial Guinea began the formal proceedings in becoming a full member of the CPLP during this summit.

=== Executive Secretary ===
Cabo Verdian diplomat Luís de Matos Monteiro da Fonseca was elected as the Executive Secretary of the Community of Portuguese Language Countries, succeeding Brazilian diplomat João Augusto de Médicis in the position.
