= 2nd CPLP Summit =

II Conference of Heads of State & Government of the CPLP 2nd CPLP Summit
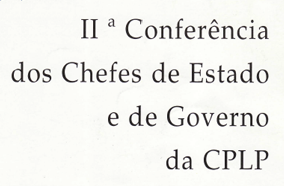
- The 2nd CPLP Summit; Praia, .
- Host country: Cape Verde
- Dates: 16-17 July 1998
- Cities: Praia
- Follows: 1st CPLP Summit
- Precedes: 3rd CPLP Summit
- Website: II Conferência de Chefes de Estado e de Governo da CPLP

The II Conference of Heads of State and Government of the CPLP (Portuguese: II Conferência de Chefes de Estado e de Governo da CPLP), commonly known as the 2nd CPLP Summit (II Cimeira da CPLP) was the 2nd biennial meeting of heads of state and heads of government of the Community of Portuguese Language Countries, held in Praia, Cabo Verde, on 16-17 July 1998.

== Outcome ==
At the 2nd CPLP Summit, the CPLP added 5 institutions as associate observers:

- Instituto Camões, the Portuguese cultural and linguistic institute
- Fundação Bial, philanthropic foundation of the Portuguese pharmaceutical company Bial
- Fórum da Lusofonia
- FELP

=== Executive Secretary ===
Marcolino Moco, former Prime Minister of Angola, was reelected in his position of Executive Secretary of the Community of Portuguese Language Countries.
