= 6th CPLP Summit =

VI Conference of Heads of State & Government of the CPLP 6th CPLP Summit
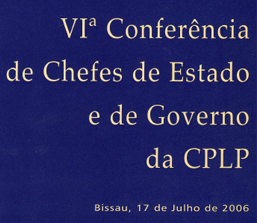
- The 6th CPLP Summit; Bissau, .
- Host country: Guinea-Bissau
- Dates: 17 July 2006
- Cities: Bissau
- Follows: 5th CPLP Summit
- Precedes: 7th CPLP Summit
- Website: VI Conferência de Chefes de Estado e de Governo da CPLP

The VI Conference of Heads of State and Government of the CPLP (Portuguese: VI Conferência de Chefes de Estado e de Governo da CPLP), commonly known as the 6th CPLP Summit (V Cimeira da CPLP) was the 6th biennial meeting of heads of state and heads of government of the Community of Portuguese Language Countries, held in Brasília, Brazil, on 17 July 2006.

== Outcome ==
The 1st Youth Forum of the CPLP was created and held during the VI CPLP Summit.

The World Bank was invited to participate, in order to study the creation of a "Lusophone economic network" between members across the world.

=== Executive Secretary ===
Cabo Verdian diplomat Luís de Matos Monteiro da Fonseca was elected as the Executive Secretary of the Community of Portuguese Language Countries, succeeding Brazilian diplomat João Augusto de Médicis in the position.
