= 4th CPLP Summit =

IV Conference of Heads of State & Government of the CPLP 4th CPLP Summit
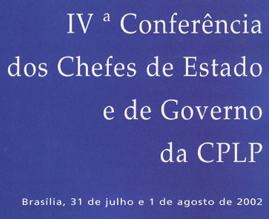
- The 4th CPLP Summit; Brasília, .
- Host country: Brazil
- Dates: 31 July-1 August 2002
- Cities: Brasília
- Follows: 3rd CPLP Summit
- Precedes: 5th CPLP Summit
- Website: IV Conferência de Chefes de Estado e de Governo da CPLP

The IV Conference of Heads of State and Government of the CPLP (Portuguese: IV Conferência de Chefes de Estado e de Governo da CPLP), commonly known as the 4th CPLP Summit (IV Cimeira da CPLP) was the 4th biennial meeting of heads of state and heads of government of the Community of Portuguese Language Countries, held in Brasília, Brazil, on 31 July-1 August 2002.

== Outcome ==
Timor Leste, after achieving independence from Indonesian occupation and completing a United Nations-led transition, became a full member of the CPLP in 2002.

=== Executive Secretary ===
Brazilian diplomat João Augusto de Médicis was elected as the Executive Secretary of the Community of Portuguese Language Countries, succeeding Dulce Pereira in the position.
