= 10th CPLP Summit =

X Conference of Heads of State & Government of the CPLP 10th CPLP Summit
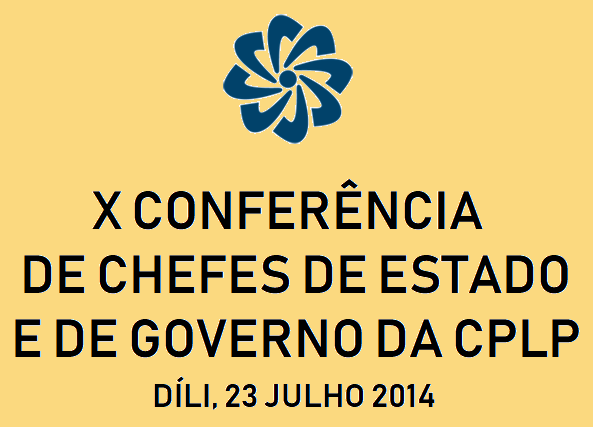
- The 10th CPLP Summit; Díli, .
- Host country: Timor Leste
- Dates: 23 July 2014
- Cities: Díli
- Follows: 9th CPLP Summit
- Precedes: 11th CPLP Summit
- Website: X Conferência de Chefes de Estado e de Governo da CPLP

The X Conference of Heads of State and Government of the CPLP (Portuguese: X Conferência de Chefes de Estado e de Governo da CPLP), commonly known as the 10th CPLP Summit (X Cimeira da CPLP) was the 10th biennial meeting of heads of state and heads of government of the Community of Portuguese Language Countries, held in Díli, Timor Leste, on 23 July 2014.

== Outcome ==
The theme of the 10th CPLP Summit was "CPLP and Globalization", centered on the importance of strengthening the Lusophone World and its influence internationally.

=== Executive Secretary ===
Mozambican diplomat Murade Isaac Murargy was reelected as the Executive Secretary of the Community of Portuguese Language Countries.
