= 3rd CPLP Summit =

III Conference of Heads of State & Government of the CPLP 3rd CPLP Summit
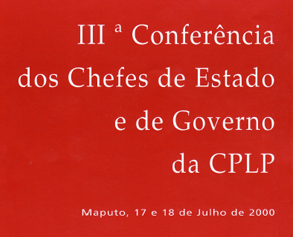
- The 3rd CPLP Summit; Maputo, .
- Host country: Mozambique
- Dates: 17-18 July 2000
- Cities: Maputo
- Follows: 2nd CPLP Summit
- Precedes: 4th CPLP Summit
- Website: III Conferência de Chefes de Estado e de Governo da CPLP

The III Conference of Heads of State and Government of the CPLP (Portuguese: III Conferência de Chefes de Estado e de Governo da CPLP), commonly known as the 3rd CPLP Summit (III Cimeira da CPLP) was the 3rd biennial meeting of heads of state and heads of government of the Community of Portuguese Language Countries, held in Maputo, Mozambique, on 17-18 July 2000.

== Outcome ==
The Defense Component of the CPLP is established with the creation of Exercício Felino.

Timor Leste, under United Nations Transitional Administration after 24 years of Indonesian occupation, began the formal proceedings in becoming a full member of the CPLP during this summit. It achieved membership in 2002.

=== Executive Secretary ===
Brazilian diplomat Dulce Pereira was elected as the Executive Secretary of the Community of Portuguese Language Countries, succeeding two-term holder Marcolino Moco, former Prime Minister of Angola.
