= Vicky Fun Ha Tchong =

East Timorese diplomat

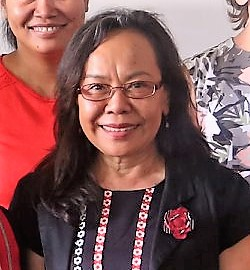
- Fun Ha Tchong in 2019

East Timorese ambassador to China
- In office 2010–2015
- Preceded by: Olimpio Branco
- Succeeded by: Bendito Freitas

Personal details
- Occupation: diplomat

Vicky Fun Ha Tchong (Chinese: 张芬霞) is an East Timorese diplomat.

== Career ==
Like many members of the ethnic Chinese minority in Timor, Tchong lived in exile in Australia during the Indonesian occupation of East Timor, before returning to East Timor after 17 years abroad. Before working for the Foreign Ministry of East Timor, she worked for the East Timor Humanitarian Response Group (ETHRG), which assisted in the return of refugees to East Timor.

In 2002, the former secretary general of the East Timorese foreign ministry, Olimpio Branco, was appointed as acting Foreign Minister. From September onwards, he was replaced by an executive team that took over the position every four months on rotation. The team consisted of Nelson Santos, as director for bilateral relations, Vicky Tchong, as administrative director, and Roberto Soares, director for regional affairs. On 1 January 2004, Santos was appointed on an interim basis as the sole secretary general, and Tchong as the vice-secretary geneal.

Tchong later served as a counsellor at the East Timorese embassy in Beijing, where Olimpio Branco served as the first East Timorese Ambassador to the People's Republic of China, from 2005 onwards. In 2008, Tchong returned to East Timor to serve as secretary general at the foreign ministry, the highest position after the foreign minister, Zacarias da Costa. In the same year, she became a member of the working group to set up the Comissão da Função Pública (CFP, Civil Service Commission), which began its work in 2009.

On 26 November 2010, Tchong was named as the East Timorese ambassador to China, succeeding Olimpio Branco. She presented her credentials to the Chinese President, Hu Jintao, on 15 February 2011. Her successor as ambassador, Bendito Freitas, was appointed on 15 November 2015 and accredited on 29 February 2016. Tchong works as an advisor to President Jose Ramos Horta.
