= List of ambassadors of Timor-Leste to China =

Coordinates: 39.961707°N 116.469380°E

Ambassador of East Timor to China
- Inaugural holder: Fakhr ed-Dine Mohamed
- Formation: June 26, 2005

The East Timorese Ambassador in Beijing is the official representative of the government of East Timor in Dili to the government of the People's Republic of China.

== List of representatives ==
diplomatic agreement/designated	Diplomatic accreditation	Ambassador	Observations	President of East Timor	Premier of the People's Republic of China	Term end	
	May 20, 2002		The day Portuguese Timor gained independence the governments in Dili and in Beijing established diplomatic relations.		Xanana Gusmão	Zhu Rongji	
	December 14, 2004		Timor-Leste opens embassy in Beijing. Jose Ramos Horta, state minister and minister of foreign affairs and cooperation of the Democratic Republic of Timor-Leste, presided over the inauguration ceremony of the Timor-Leste embassy in China.		Xanana Gusmão	Wen Jiabao	
	June 26, 2005	Leonor Cardoso Mendes Mota	Chargé d'affaires		Xanana Gusmão	Wen Jiabao	October 24, 2005
	October 24, 2005	Olímpio Branco			Xanana Gusmão	Wen Jiabao	February 15, 2011
November 2, 2010	February 15, 2011	Vicky Fun Ha Tchong			José Ramos-Horta	Wen Jiabao	
November 19, 2015	February 29, 2016	Bendito Freitas	No. 66/2015, É nomeado Embaixador Extraordinário e Plenipotenciário, o Sr. Bendito dos Santos Freitas, para a República Popular da China		Taur Matan Ruak	Li Keqiang	2023
