= 7th CPLP Summit =

VII Conference of Heads of State & Government of the CPLP 7th CPLP Summit
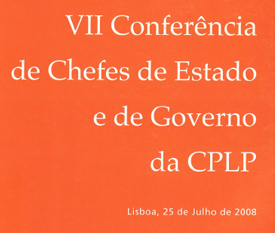
- The 7th CPLP Summit; Lisbon, 2008.
- Host country: Portugal
- Dates: 24–25 July 2008
- Cities: Lisbon
- Follows: 6th CPLP Summit
- Precedes: 8th CPLP Summit
- Website: VII Conferência de Chefes de Estado e de Governo

The VII Conference of Heads of State and Government of the CPLP (Portuguese: Conferência de Chefes de Estado e de Governo da CPLP), commonly known as the 7th CPLP Summit (VII Cimeira da CPLP) was the 7th biennial meeting of heads of state and heads of government of the Community of Portuguese Language Countries, held in Lisbon, Portugal, on 24–25 July 2008.

== Outcome ==
At this Summit, Senegal become the third associate member of CPLP. Senegal has a strong community of people that came from Guinea-Bissau and Cape Verde. Senegal also includes the Casamance territory that was Portuguese until the 19th century, when it was ceded to France. Even today, the people of Casamance are more linked with Guinea-Bissau than with Senegal itself and some of the citizens of the territory even want an independent Portuguese-speaking Casamance country.

== Participants ==
=== Members ===
- Portugal
  - President Aníbal Cavaco Silva
- Angola
  - Prime Minister Fernando da Piedade Dias dos Santos
- Brazil
  - President Luiz Inácio Lula da Silva
- Cape Verde
  - President Pedro Pires
- Guinea-Bissau
  - President João Bernardo Vieira
- Mozambique
  - Minister of Foreign Affairs Oldemiro Balói
- São Tomé and Príncipe
  - President Fradique de Menezes
- Timor-Leste
  - President José Ramos-Horta

=== Associate observers ===
- Equatorial Guinea
  - President Teodoro Obiang Nguema Mbasogo
- Mauritius
  - Representative of the Minister of Foreign Affairs Jacques Balyon
- Senegal
  - Minister of Foreign Affairs Cheikh Tidiane Gadio

=== Organizations ===
- African Union
  - Commission Chairperson Jean Ping
