= International Association of Portuguese-Speaking Communications =

International association

The International Association of Portuguese-Speaking Communications (AICEP) is an association of postal and telecommunications operators of Portuguese speaking countries. Currently it has 34 members from 9 countries and territories of Portuguese Official Language. Nine of them are postal authorities. In December 1998, it became one of the sixteen restricted unions of the Universal Postal Union. It was created on 16 November 1993.
