= Community of Portuguese Language Countries =

International organization

Comunidade dos Países de Língua Portuguesa Community of Portuguese Language Countries
- Flag

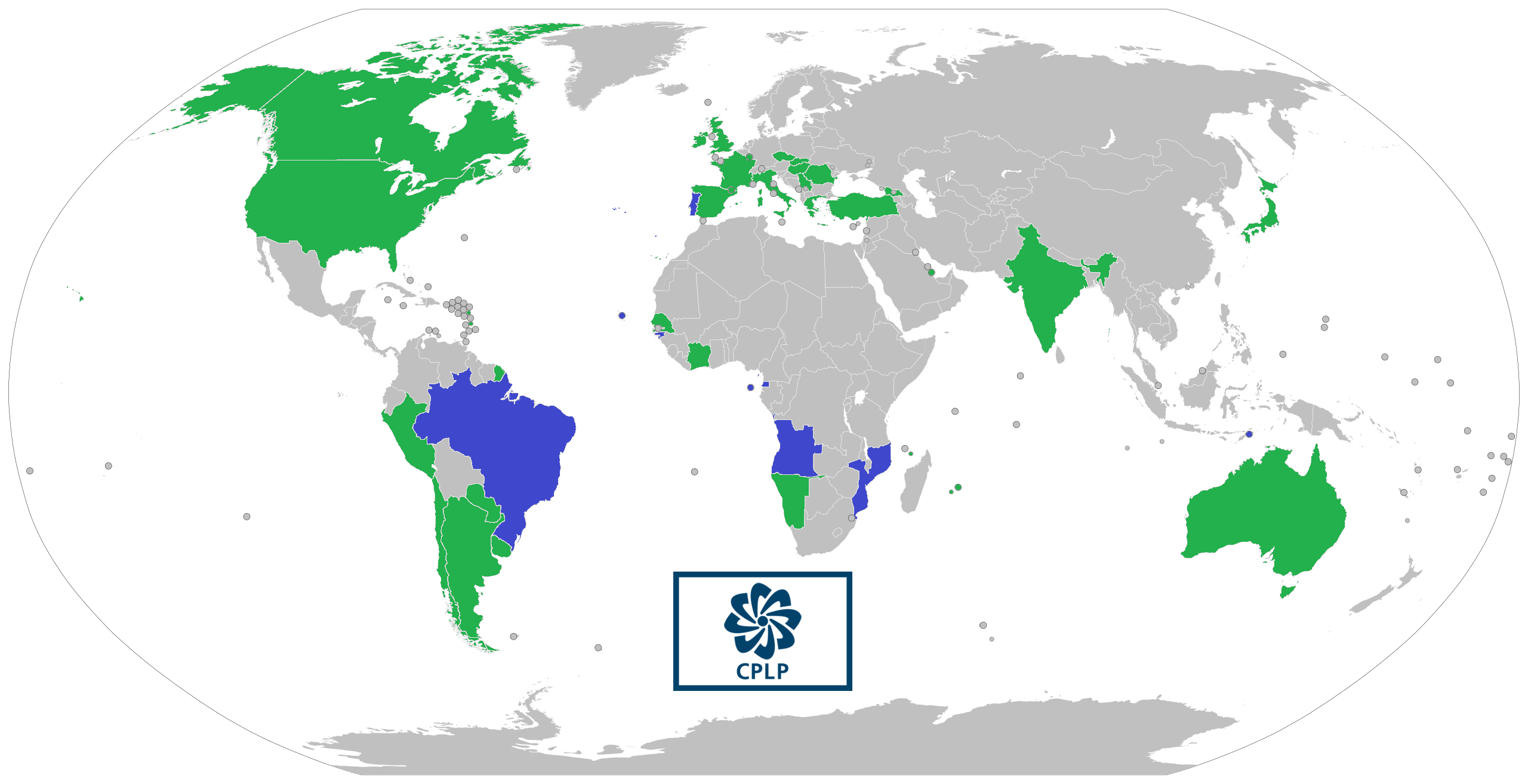
- Map of CPLP member states (blue) and associate observers (green)
- Headquarters: Penafiel Palace; Lisbon, Portugal; 38°42.65′N 9°8.05′W
- Official language: Portuguese
- Membership: 9 member states: Angola; Brazil; Cabo Verde; Equatorial Guinea; Guinea-Bissau; Mozambique; Portugal; São Tomé and Príncipe; Timor-Leste; 34 observers: Andorra; Argentina; Australia; Canada; Chile; Côte d'Ivoire; Czech Republic; France; Georgia; Greece; Hungary; India; Ireland; Italy; Japan; Luxembourg; Mauritius; Namibia; Paraguay; Peru; Qatar; Romania; Senegal; Serbia; Slovakia; Spain; Turkey; United Kingdom; United States; Uruguay; European Union; g7+; Ibero-American Summit; Organization of Ibero-American States

Leaders
  - Executive Secretary: Maria de Fátima Monteiro Jardim
  - Director-General: Miguel Monteiro
  - President of the Parliamentary Assembly: Vacant
- Establishment: 17 July 1996

Area
  - Total: 10,743,526 km^{2} (4,148,099 sq mi)

Population
  - Estimate: 287 million (2021)
- Website cplp.org

The Community of Portuguese Language Countries (Portuguese: Comunidade dos Países de Língua Portuguesa; abbr. : CPLP), also known as the Lusophone Commonwealth or Lusophone Community (Portuguese: Comunidade Lusófona), is an international organization and political association of Lusophone nations across four continents, where Portuguese is an official language. The CPLP operates as a privileged, multilateral forum for the mutual cooperation of the governments, economies, non-governmental organizations, and peoples of the Lusofonia. The CPLP consists of 9 member states and 34 associate observers, located in Africa, América, Asia, Europe and Oceania, totalling 39 countries and 4 organizations.

The CPLP was founded in 1996, in Lisbon, by Angola, Brazil, Cabo Verde, Guinea-Bissau, Mozambique, Portugal, and São Tomé and Príncipe, nearly two decades after the beginning of the decolonization of the Portuguese Empire. Following the independence of Timor-Leste in 2002 and the application by Equatorial Guinea in 2014, both of those countries became members of the CPLP. Galicia (an autonomous community of Spain), Macau (a special administrative region of China), and Uruguay are formally interested in full membership and another 17 countries across the world are formally interested in associate observer status.

== History ==
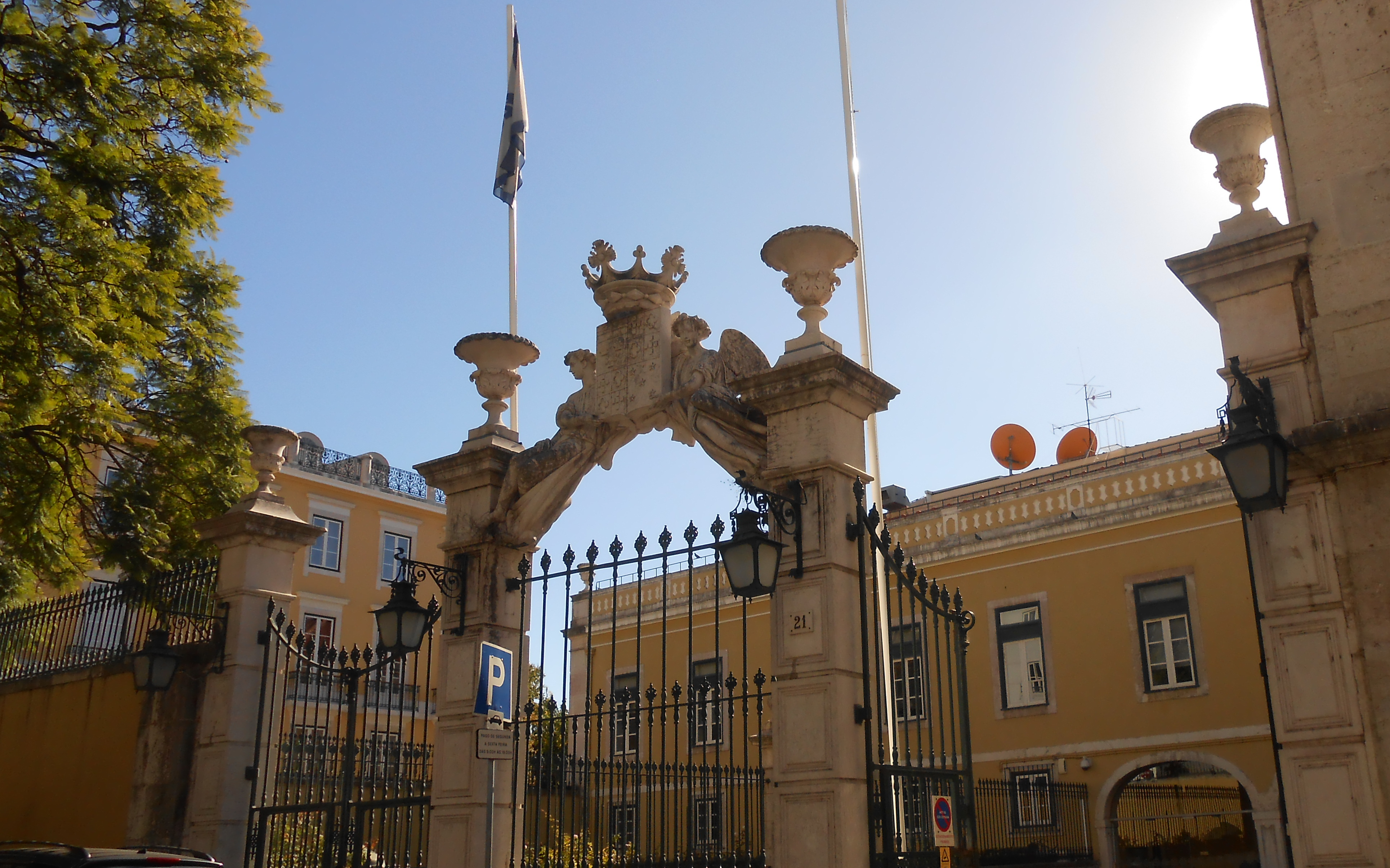
The seat of the Executive Secretariat of the CPLP is at Penafiel Palace, in Lisbon, the capital of Portugal.

The idea of a type of international community or political union of Portuguese language countries had been proposed and studied numerous times in history. However, the idea for what would become the CPLP came about in 1983, during a state visit to Cabo Verde by Jaime Gama, Foreign Minister of Portugal, when he first proposed a biennial summit of heads of state and government of Lusophone countries of the world and the idea of regular meetings between ministerial counterparts of the member states.

The Community of Portuguese Language Countries was officially founded on 17 July 1996 at the 1st CPLP Heads of State and Government Summit, in Lisbon, Portugal.

In 2005, during a meeting in Luanda, the ministers of culture of the member states declared the 05 May as the Lusophone Culture Day (Dia da Cultura Lusófona in Portuguese).

Through successive enlargements, the Union has grown from the seven founding states—Angola, Brazil, Cabo Verde, Guinea-Bissau, Mozambique, Portugal, and São Tomé and Príncipe—to the current nine, with the self-determination of Timor-Leste in 2002 and the accession of Equatorial Guinea in 2014 at the 10th CPLP Summit in Dili, Timor-Leste with the issuance of the Dili Declaration.

The community has grown beyond its mission in fostering cultural ties between the Portuguese language countries into facilitating trade and political cooperation between the Lusophone countries of the world, with the CPLP is the fourth-largest producer of oil in the world and its citizens totalling more than 270 million people.

In 2017, in Brasília, the nine member states agreed to enlarge cooperation in matters of the seas, tourism, economy and more ambitious defense and cooperation mechanisms. More rights to the observer states were also approved, which Argentina planned to join.

== Structure ==
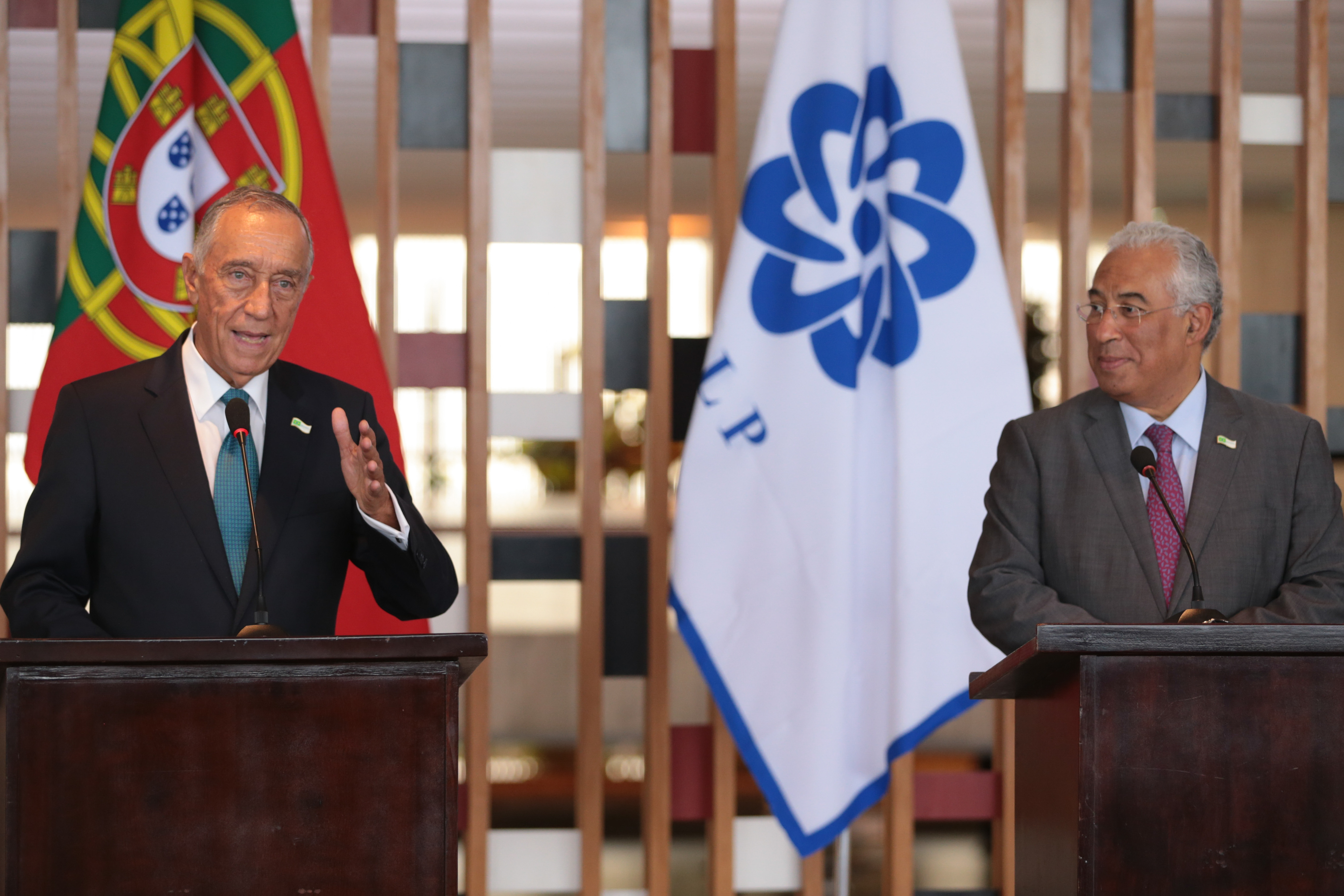
President Marcelo Rebelo de Sousa of Portugal speaking at the 11th CPLP Summit while Portuguese Prime Minister António Costa looks on

The CPLP's guidelines and priorities are established by a biannual Conference of Heads of State and Government (known as the CPLP Summits) and the Organization's plan of action is approved by the Council of Foreign Ministers, which meets every year. Special summits can be requested at any time by 2/3 of the member states, usually for the purpose of pressing matters or incidents at the moment. There are also monthly meetings of the Permanent Steering Committee that follow specific initiatives and projects.

The headquarters of the CPLP is in Penafiel Palace in Lisbon, Portugal, but the organization maintains dedicated bureaus in all of the foreign ministries of the CPLP member states.

The CPLP is financed by its member states.

=== Mission ===
CPLP is a multilateral forum created to deepen cultural, economic, and political cooperation among the Lusophone (Portuguese-speaking) nations of the world. The prime objectives of the CPLP are:

- Promotion and dissemination of the Portuguese language
- Political and diplomatic cooperation between the member states of the CPLP
- Cooperation in all areas, including education, health, science and technology, defense, agriculture, public administration, communications, justice, public safety, culture, sports and media

=== Executive Secretary ===
The Executive Secretary of the CPLP (Portuguese: Secretário Executivo da CPLP) is the executive head and highest representative of the CPLP. The Executive Secretary is charged with leading the Executive Secretariat (Secretariado Executivo), the CPLP's executive branch responsible for creating and implementing the CPLP's agenda of projects and initiatives. The Executive Secretary, who must be a high-ranking diplomat or politician from one of the member states, is elected for a mandate of two years at the biennial CPLP Summit, and can be reelected once to a second term. The Executive Secretariat is headquartered at Penafiel Palace in Lisbon, Portugal.

| # | Portrait | Name | Country | Start | End | Background |
|---|---|---|---|---|---|---|
| 1 | | Marcolino José Carlos Moco | Angola | July 1996 | July 2000 | 3rd Prime Minister of Angola (1992–1996) |
| 2 | | Dulce Pereira | Brazil | July 2000 | August 2002 | President of the Fundação Cultural Palmares (1996–2000) |
| 3 | | João Augusto de Médicis | Brazil | August 2002 | April 2004 | Brazilian Ambassador to Kenya (1984–1989); Brazilian Ambassador to Poland (1991–1993); Brazilian Ambassador to China (1994–1996); Brazilian Ambassador to Chile (1999–2002) |
| 4 | | Luís de Matos Monteiro da Fonseca | Cape Verde | July 2004 | July 2008 | Cape Verdean Ambassador to European Community (1987–1991); Cape Verdean Ambassador to Russia (1991–1994); Cape Verdean Ambassador to Austria (1999–2001); Cape Verdean Ambassador to the United Nations (2001–2004) |
| 5 | | Domingos Simões Pereira | Guinea-Bissau | July 2008 | July 2012 | 16th Prime Minister of Guinea-Bissau (2014–2015); Guinea-Bissau Minister of Public Works (2004–2005) |
| 6 | | Murade Isaac Murargy | Mozambique | July 2012 | January 2017 | Secretary-General of the Presidency of Mozambique (1995–2005); Mozambican Ambassador to France and Germany (1985–1995) |
| 7 | | Maria do Carmo Silveira | São Tomé and Príncipe | January 2017 | December 2018 | 13th Prime Minister of São Tomé and Príncipe (2005–2006); Governor of the São Toméan Central Bank (1999–2005, 2011–2016) |
| 8 | | Francisco Ribeiro Telles | Portugal | December 2018 | July 2021 | Portuguese Ambassador to Cape Verde (2002–2006); Portuguese Ambassador to Angola (2007–2012); Portuguese Ambassador to Brazil (2012–2016); Portuguese Ambassador to Italy (2016–2018) |
| 9 | | Zacarias da Costa | Timor-Leste | July 2021 | July 2025 | East Timorese Minister of Foreign Affairs (2007–2012) |
| 10 | | Maria de Fátima Monteiro Jardim | Angola | July 2025 | Present | Angolan Ambassador to Italy (2019–2025); Angolan Ambassador to Malta (2021-present); Angolan Ambassador to Albania (2023-present) |

=== Council of Ministers ===
The Council of Ministers is made up of the ministers of Foreign Affairs of the nine Member States. The powers of the Council of Ministers are:

- Coordinate CPLP activities;
- Supervise the functioning and development of CPLP;
- Approve the CPLP budget;
- Make recommendations to the Conference of Heads of State and Government on matters of general policy, as well as the efficient and harmonious functioning and development of the CPLP;
- To recommend to the Conference of Heads of State the candidates for the positions of Executive Secretary and Deputy Executive Secretary;
- Convene conferences and other meetings with a view to promoting the objectives and programs of the CPLP; Carry out other tasks entrusted to it by the Conference of Heads of State and Government.

The Council of Ministers elects, from among its members, a President on a rotating basis and for a term of two years (usually, the Minister of the host country). The Council of Ministers ordinarily meets once a year and, extraordinarily, when requested by two-thirds of the member states.

The Council of Ministers reports to the Conference of Heads of State and Government, to which it must present its reports. Decisions by the Council of Ministers are taken by consensus.

=== Director General ===
The Executive Secretary is assisted in his duties by the Director General. The Statutes establish, since the Summit of Bissau in 2006, the existence of a Director General, and the position of Deputy Executive Secretary ceased with his appointment.

The Director General is recruited from among the nationals of the Member States, through public examination, for a period of three years, renewable for an equal period. The Director General is responsible, under the guidance of the Executive Secretary, for the day-to-day management, financial planning and execution, preparation, coordination and guidance of the meetings and projects activated by the Executive Secretariat. The current director general of CPLP is Armindo Brito Fernandes, from São Tomé and Príncipe, who took office on 10 February 2020.

| # | Name | Portrait | Country | Start | End |
|---|---|---|---|---|---|
| 1 | Hélder Vaz Lopes | | Guinea-Bissau | January 2008 | January 2014 |
| 2 | Georgina Benrós de Mello | | Cape Verde | February 2014 | February 2020 |
| 3 | Armindo Brito Fernandes | | São Tomé and Príncipe | February 2020 | May 2025 |
| 4 | Miguel Monteiro | | Cape Verde | May 2025 | Present |

=== Goodwill Ambassadors ===
At the VI Summit of CPLP Heads of State and Government (Bissau, 2006) the first CPLP Goodwill Ambassadors were also appointed, who, according to the approved regulation, are appointed for a two-year term and must be personalities of merit. recognized and distinguished themselves in promoting the values defended by the CPLP.

The chosen personalities were three former Heads of State, Jorge Sampaio (Portugal), José Sarney (Brazil) and Joaquim Chissano (Mozambique). A prime minister and a minister, Fernando Van-Dunen (Angola) and Albertino Bragança (São Tomé and Príncipe); the musician Martinho da Vila (Brazil) and Gustavo Vaz da Conceição, president of the Angolan Basketball Federation and member of the Angola Olympic Committee.

At the XV Council of Ministers, on 22 July 2010, in Luanda, Ambassador Luís Fonseca, former CPLP Executive Secretary, was appointed.

=== Defense component ===
In 2016, CPLP revised its cooperation protocol in defense, affirming the organization in the promotion of peace and security.

The 2017 Exercício Felino military exercise taking place in Academia Militar das Agulhas Negras, Resende, in the state of Rio de Janeiro, Brazil, aims for the increased interoperability of the armed forces of Angola, Brazil, Cape Verde, Equatorial Guinea, Guinea-Bissau, Mozambique, Portugal, São Tomé and Príncipe, and Timor-Leste. The first phase of the exercise, known as Carta (chart) took place in Cape Verde in 2016, in which the operation was planned and executed using computer networks as a war game. The Exercício Felino was established in the year 2000.

=== CPLP Mobility ===
The 2021 Summit in Luanda saw the creation of the CPLP Mobility, a system that seeks to facilitate the entry and permanence of citizens of one country in another.

=== CPLP Youth Forum ===
The Youth Forum of the Community of Portuguese Language Countries (FJCPLP) is the Community instance responsible for the protection and promotion of the rights of youth internationally. Created in 1997, its objective is to bring together representative platforms of civil society youth organizations (Youth Councils) in the Member States to strengthen the protagonism and participation of youth in the development of their countries and the world.

For its intervention, the Conference instituted as anchor activities the CPLP Sports Games and the CPLP Young Creators Biennial, to be held interpolated each year. In addition to these activities, sectorial Action Plans for two years are instituted, which seek to meet the priorities identified for the period in question. As part of its action, the Conference establishes partnerships with national or international organizations for activities in areas of clear interest to members. Its current president is Bissau-Guinean Aissatu Forbs Djaló.

=== Parliamentary Assembly ===
The Parliamentary Assembly of Lusophony is the body that brings together the representations of all the Parliaments of the Member States, constituted on the basis of the respective electoral results of the legislative elections.

The Parliamentary Assembly, founded on the principle of one language - the Portuguese language - and common values, constitutes a space for strengthening ties of cooperation, solidarity and exchange between member Parliaments, with a view to contributing to the consolidation of peace, democracy and the rule of law in the respective countries. These are the pillars on which the objectives enshrined in the Statute and Regulations are based, instruments approved right at its first meeting. The rotating presidency of the CPLP Parliamentary Assembly was assumed in July 2021 by Guinea-Bissau, whose executive secretary is Cipriano Cassamá.

=== Network of Women Parliamentarians ===
The Network of Women Parliamentarians of the AP-CPLP (RM-AP-CPLP) is an organism of the Parliamentary Assembly considered a space for consultation and cooperation that watches over issues of gender equality and equity, with specific objectives and competences. This body is governed by its own Statute and integrates all the Deputies in effective functions in the Parliaments of the member countries of the CPLP. The President belongs to the country that holds the presidency of the AP-CPLP, being currently chaired by the Brazilian Rosângela Gomes. Among the competences attributed to the functioning of this Network, the defense and promotion of gender equality and equity in social, political and economic life in the CPLP universe are distinguished; encouraging the formation and training of women parliamentarians; support for the candidacy of Women for the exercise of leadership; encouraging the implementation of public policies and legislation aimed at combating the feminization of poverty, sexually transmitted infections and the education of young people; the encouragement of behavior that is against practices that are likely to cause physical harm; and also, the improvement of the participation of women parliamentarians in conflict prevention and electoral processes.

== Operating agencies ==
The Community of Portuguese Language Countries relies on six operating agencies to carry out its mandate: Universidade da Integração Internacional da Lusofonia Afro-Brasileira, União das Cidades Capitais Luso-Afro-Américo-Asiáticas, Associação das Universidades de Língua Portuguesa, Instituto Internacional da Língua Portuguesa, União dos Advogados de Língua Portuguesa and TV CPLP via Web.

=== University for International Integration of the Afro-Brazilian Lusophony (UNILAB) ===
The UNILAB is a public federal university located in Redenção, Ceará, Brazil. The major courses offered are preferentially the ones included in the mutual interest of all countries in the Community of Portuguese Language Countries. They are: Portugal, Brazil, Angola, Cape Verde, Guinea-Bissau, Sao Tome and Principe, Mozambique and Timor-Leste. Looking for international integration, 50% of the seats in the University are for international students from those countries. The UNILAB is a private postgraduate institution that trains managers and high-level trainers in areas that are a priority for development in Lusophone Africa, but also includes Timor-Leste and Macau. Its political-pedagogical project is innovative, as are those of Unila and Uniam, aiming at international integration.

=== UCCLA ===
The União das Cidades Capitais Luso-Afro-Américo-Asiáticas – UCCLA (English: Portuguese, African, American and Asian Capital Cities Union, or PACCU) is an international organization formed by capital cities of the Portuguese-speaking world. It was founded in Lisbon on 28 June 1985, at Centro Cultural das Descobertas (Discoveries Culture Centre). On that date, the constitutive document was signed by the mayors of Lisbon (Nuno Abecasis), Bissau (Francisca Pereira), Maputo (Alberto Massavanhane), Praia (Felix Gomes Monteiro), Rio de Janeiro (Laura de Macedo; no longer Brazil's capital city since 1960), São Tomé (Gaspar Ramos) and Macau (Carlos Algéos Ayres). Its current secretary general is the Portuguese politician Vitor Ramalho.

Then came the remaining capital cities of official Portuguese speech, as well as other, non-capital cities; namely: Brasília (1986; capital of Brazil since 1960), Cacheu and Luanda (1989), Guimarães (1990), Taipa and Coloane islands (1991), Santo António (1993), Ilha de Moçambique (1994), Salvador (1995), Belo Horizonte (1998), Belém (1999), Bolama, Huambo, Porto Alegre and Mindelo (2000), Dili (2002), São Filipe, Oecusse (2004), Angra do Heroísmo (2013) and the Galician language capital Santiago de Compostela (2016).

This international and intermunicipal association focuses on cooperative projects in the fields of business, immigration, culture, promotion of the Portuguese language, and urban issues such as garbage, public road systems, heritage conservation, public health and water supply.

=== Association of Portuguese Language Universities (AULP) ===
Founded in 1986 in Lisbon, Portugal, the Association of Portuguese Language Universities (AULP) is an international NGO that promotes cooperation and information exchange between universities and higher institutes. With around 140 members from the eight Portuguese-speaking countries (Portugal, Brazil, Angola, Mozambique, Guinea-Bissau, Cape Verde, São Tomé and Príncipe, Timor-Leste) and Macau, its mission is to facilitate communication between members for the benefit of collective development of teaching and the Portuguese language in the world. It aims to stimulate research and exchange between students and teachers and also proposes continuous reflection through the daily dissemination of news and the organization of conferences and events. The president of the AULP is usually the vice-rector of the university elected to preside over the organization, and it is currently headed by the University of Coimbra, whose vice-rector is the Portuguese João Nuno Calvão da Silva.

=== International Portuguese Language Institute ===
The International Portuguese Language Institute is the Community of Portuguese Language Countries's institute supporting the spread and popularity of the Portuguese language in the world. The institute's headquarters is located in Praia, Cape Verde. Its history starts in 1989 when the countries of Portuguese language gathered in São Luís do Maranhão in Brazil to create a base for a Portuguese language community. The Brazilian president, José Sarney, proposed the idea of an international institute to promote the language. Only 10 years later in a meeting in São Tomé and Príncipe, a small island-nation in the Gulf of Guinea, the institute's objectives, implementation and location (Cape Verde) were set.

The IILP's fundamental objectives are "the promotion, the defence, the enrichment and the spread of the Portuguese language as a vehicle of culture, education, information and access to scientific and technologic knowledge and of official use in international forums".

=== Union of Portuguese Speaking Lawyers ===
The Union of Portuguese Language Lawyers (UALP) was created in 2002 under the designation of "Association of Bar Associations and Lawyers of Portuguese Speaking Countries", thus formalizing the alliance that existed between the lawyers of Angola, Brazil, Cape Verde, Guinea- Bissau, Macau, Mozambique, Portugal, São Tomé and Príncipe, and Timor-Leste. The designation of UALP was adopted in 2005. Currently, the UALP represents more than a million lawyers.

The UALP's main vectors of action are centered on cooperation in terms of training, internships, the way of practicing law and the relevant legislation applicable to lawyers, as well as the sharing of experiences in the scope of management, organization of events and forms of contact and participation of lawyers registered with the respective Orders and Associations. Its current president is the Angolan lawyer Luís Paulo Monteiro.

=== TV CPLP ===
TV CPLP is a proposal for a television channel made within the Community of Portuguese Language Countries to be broadcast internationally. Its costs will be borne by UNESCO and the Portuguese Government. All programs will be broadcast in Portuguese, in their different ways of speaking and all accents. At CPLP, the proposal was discussed at the Workshop on the Television Content Sharing Platform, between Public Televisions of Portuguese Speaking Countries and CPLP TV, in Lisbon on 16 October 2007, as well as at the Round Table for a Television Content Sharing Platform between Public Television Operators from Portuguese-speaking Countries and TV CPLP, in Lisbon from March 5 to 7, 2007.

It will be created by the following Portuguese-speaking TV channels and will be broadcast by the 8 founding countries and also to other countries.

As a Lusophone Content Exchange Platform, the proposal was presented in Brazil as a project by the Instituto Cultural Brasil Plus (ICBrPLus) called "TV CPLP Via Web" by a commission of the Federal Senate of Brazil and approved by Ordinance No. 416 of the Secretariat Executive of the Ministry of Culture.

== Membership ==
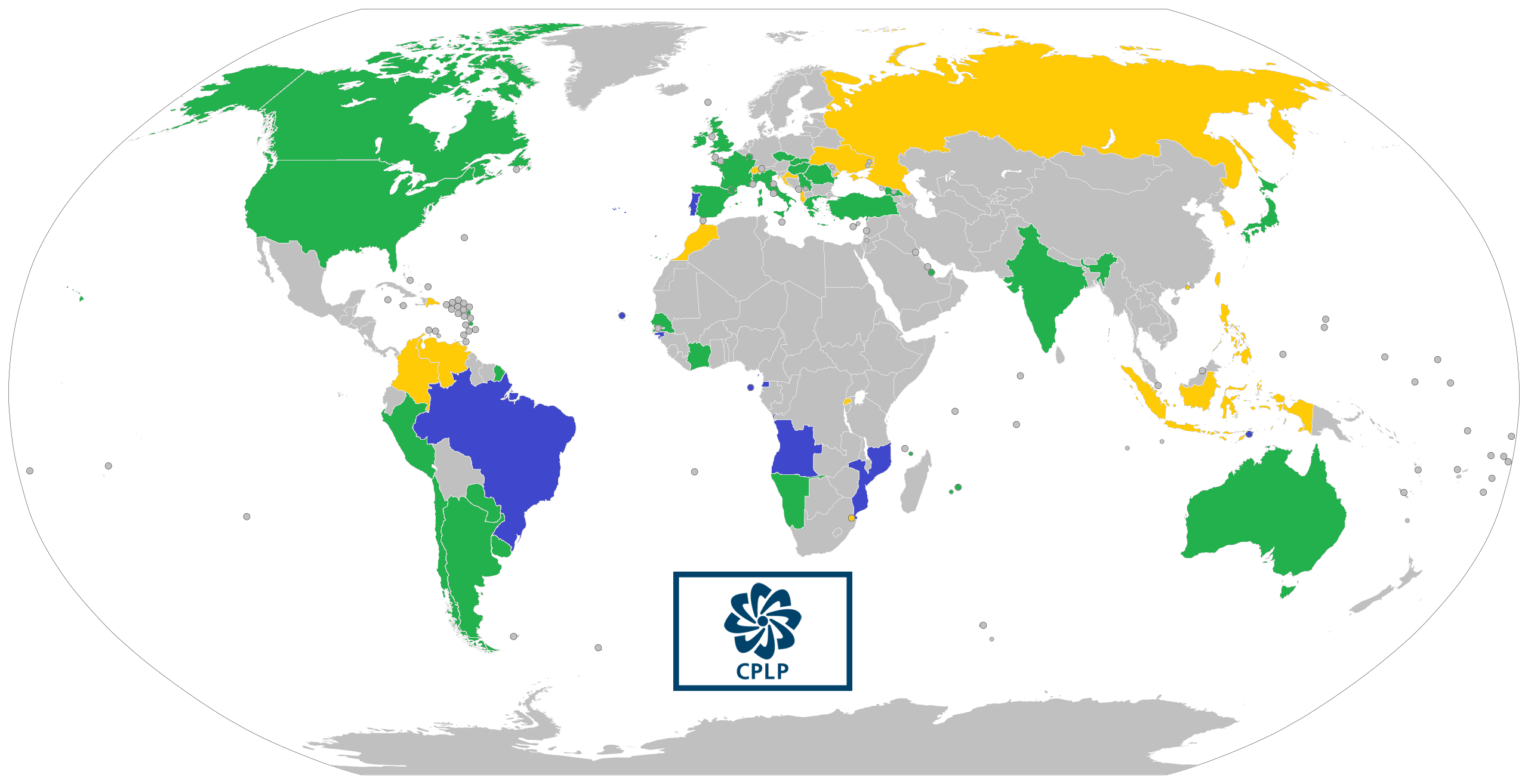
CPLP Member States CPLP Associate Observers Officially-Interested Countries & Territories

=== Member states ===
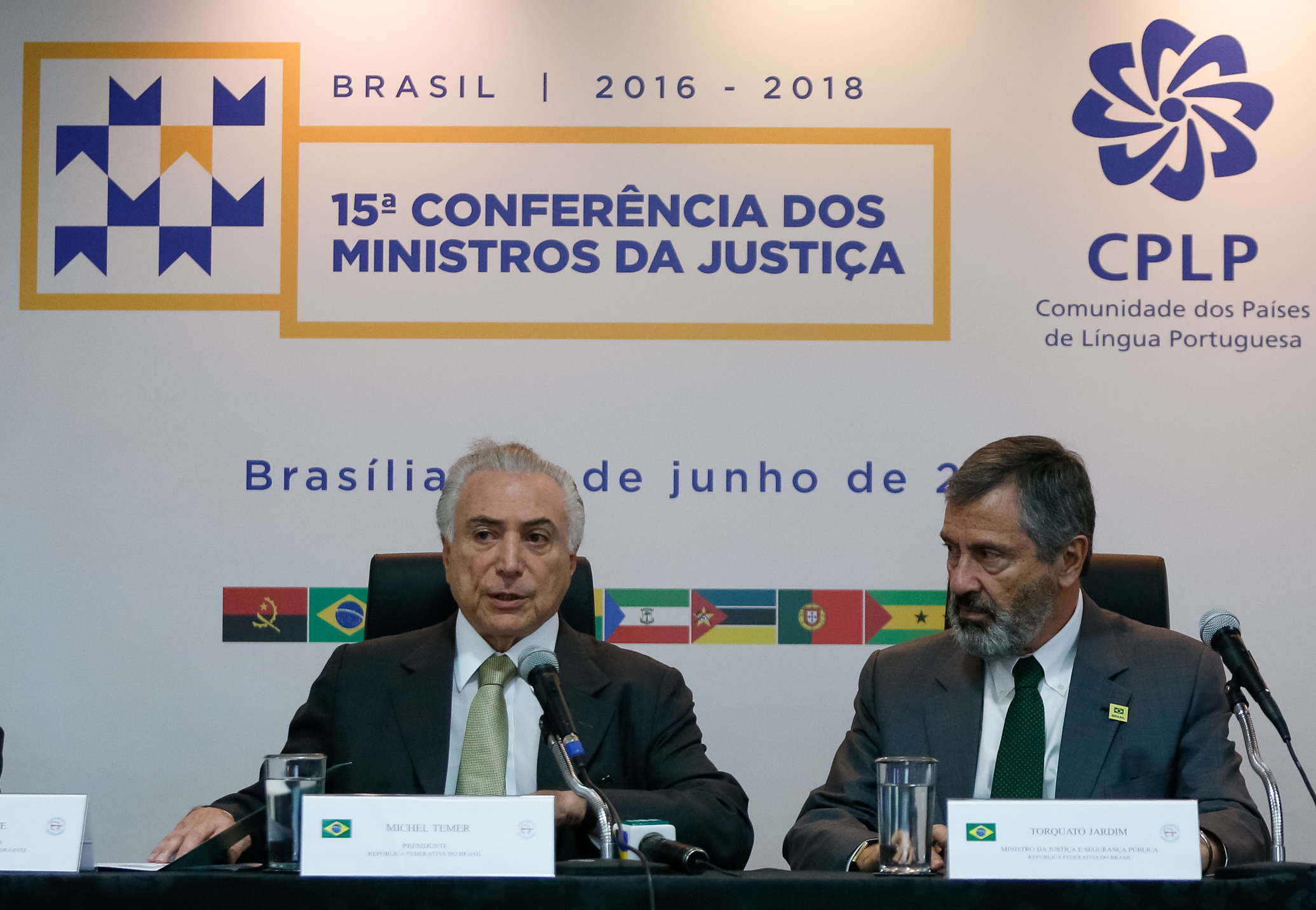
President Michel Temer of Brazil speaking at the 15th Meeting of Ministers of Justice

There are nine full member states of the CPLP. Seven were founding members of the CPLP: Angola, Brazil, Cape Verde, Guinea-Bissau, Mozambique, Portugal, and São Tomé and Príncipe; Timor-Leste joined in 2002 after achieving independence, and Equatorial Guinea joined in 2014.

==== Macau candidacy ====
Macau was the last Portuguese colony to be decolonized, and returned to China in 1999 after more than four centuries under Portuguese control. It still retains traces of Lusophone culture and Portuguese is one of the official languages of the territory. Despite that, the majority of the population in Macau do not speak and understand Portuguese; rather, Cantonese is the main language, only a minority of the residents speak Portuguese as second language. In 2006, during the II Ministerial meeting between China and Portuguese Speaking Countries, the CPLP Executive Secretary and Deputy ambassador Tadeu Soares invited the Chief Executive of the Government of the Macau Special Administrative Region, Edmund Ho, to request the Associate Observer status for Macau. The Government of Macau has not yet formalized this request.

==== Equatorial Guinea accession ====
When the CPLP was formed, Equatorial Guinea asked for observer status. Equatorial Guinea (Portuguese: Guiné Equatorial) was a Portuguese colony from the 15th to 18th centuries and has some territories where Portuguese-based creole languages are spoken and cultural connections with São Tomé and Príncipe and Portugal are felt, namely Annobón, where Annobonese Creole is spoken. In the 21st century, the country has cooperated with Portuguese-speaking African countries and Brazil at an educational level. At the CPLP summit of July 2004, in São Tomé and Príncipe, the member states agreed to change the statutes of the community to accept states as associate observers. Equatorial Guinea then engaged in discussion for full membership. In June 2010, Equatorial Guinea asked to be admitted as full member. At its eighth summit in Luanda in July 2010, the CPLP decided to open formal negotiations with Equatorial Guinea about full membership in the CPLP. At its 10th summit in Dili in July 2014, Equatorial Guinea was admitted as CPLP member.

=== Associate observers ===
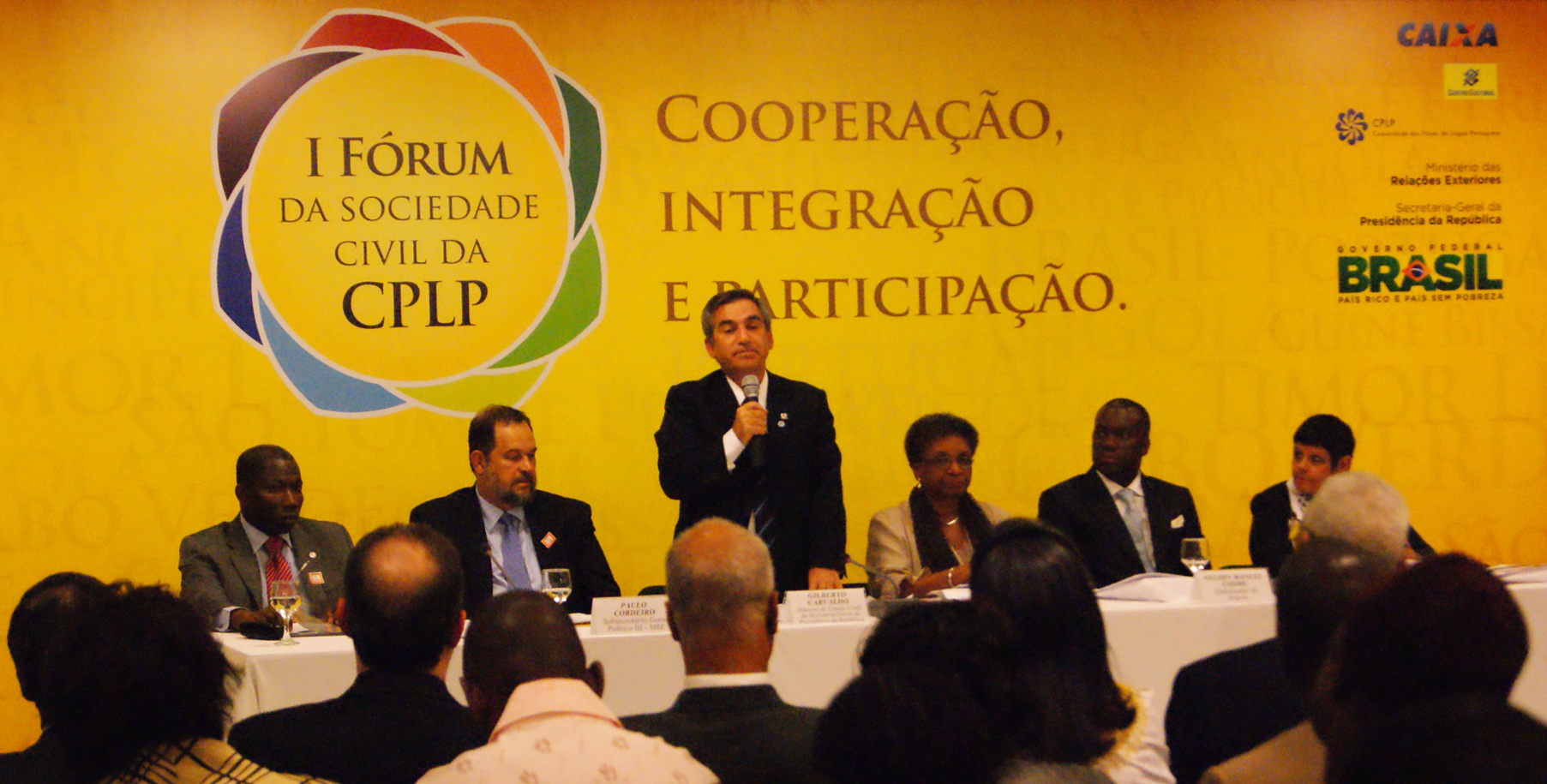
I Forum of Civil Society of the CPLP; 2010.

In July 2006, during the Bissau summit, Equatorial Guinea and Mauritius were admitted as Associate Observers along with 17 International associations and organizations considered as Consultative Observers. On 23 July 2014, Equatorial Guinea was admitted as a CPLP member.

Mauritius, which was discovered by Portuguese explorers and maintains strong connections with Mozambique, is an Associate Observer. In 2008, Senegal, with historical connections to Portuguese colonisation in Casamance, was admitted as Associate Observer.

In July 2014, during the Dili summit, the Heads of State and Government approved a resolution that grants Georgia, Japan, Namibia and Turkey the status of Associate Observers. Japan has had historical contacts with the Portuguese language in the 16th and 17th century, and today has connections to the Lusophone world through Japanese Brazilians in Brazil and Japan. Namibia has had extensive contact with the Lusophone world due to its location just south of Angola, and many residents of Angolan origin (both black and Portuguese) live here.

Three European nations, the Czech Republic, Hungary, and Slovakia, were admitted as observers along with Uruguay at the 2016 summit. Uruguay has historical ties to Brazil and Portugal and has some speakers of Uruguayan Portuguese, an Uruguayan variety of Portuguese. In January 2018 and prior to the 2018 summit, Italy requested the observer status as an effort for the consolidation of bilateral relations with all of the Portuguese-speaking countries; Italy has historical connections to Brazil through Italian Brazilians in Brazil and Italy. In its request, the Italian government referred that due to the increasing number of associated observers in the community, CPLP is becoming a forum for countries in various geographical regions. Earlier in January, Andorra also formalized its candidacy for the same status. Italy shares a legacy of Ancient Rome and Italy is the non-Lusophone nation with the greatest number of university chairs in the Portuguese language. Because of immigration and geographic proximity, Portuguese is one of the most spoken languages in Andorra.

In the 2018 summit with all the heads of state present, with the exception of Timor-Leste due to national policy issues, several observers joined the organization: Luxembourg, Andorra, the United Kingdom, Argentina, Serbia, Chile, France, Italy and the Organization of Ibero-American States joined as observers. Uruguay, an observer nation since 2016, admitted in early 2018 a candidacy to become full member of the CPLP.

The 2021 summit in Luanda, Angola saw the admission of ten new state observers to the organization: Canada, Côte d'Ivoire, Greece, India, Ireland, Peru, Qatar, Romania, Spain and the United States. They were joined by the organizational observers of the G7+, the Ibero-American Summit and the European Public Law Organization.

Associate Observers of the CPLP
| Observer state | Admitted |
|---|---|
| Mauritius | July 2006 |
| Senegal | July 2008 |
| Georgia | July 2014 |
| Japan | July 2014 |
| Namibia | July 2014 |
| Turkey | July 2014 |
| Czech Republic | November 2016 |
| Hungary | November 2016 |
| Slovakia | November 2016 |
| Uruguay | November 2016 |
| Andorra | July 2018 |
| Argentina | July 2018 |
| Chile | July 2018 |
| France | July 2018 |
| Italy | July 2018 |
| Luxembourg | July 2018 |
| United Kingdom | July 2018 |
| Serbia | July 2018 |
| Canada | July 2021 |
| Greece | July 2021 |
| India | July 2021 |
| Ireland | July 2021 |
| Ivory Coast | July 2021 |
| Qatar | July 2021 |
| Spain | July 2021 |
| Peru | July 2021 |
| Romania | July 2021 |
| United States | July 2021 |
| Paraguay | August 2023 |

=== Consultative observers ===
The status of consultative observer is granted to organizations of civil society throughout the Lusofonia and pan-Lusophone bodies, as well as Lusophone institutions based outside of the Lusofonia, which serve a consultative status to the CPLP.

| Country | Consultative observers |
|---|---|
| Angola | Fundação Agostinho Neto; Fundação Eduardo dos Santos; Liga Africana |
| Brazil | Academia Brasileira de Letras; Associação Cultural Videobrasil; Fundação Rotarianos São Paulo; National Council of Health Secretaries of Brazilian States; Fundação Alexandre de Gusmão; Fundação Getúlio Vargas; Fundação Oswaldo Cruz; Fundação Roberto Marinho; Brazilian Historic and Geographic Institute; Royal Portuguese Cabinet of Reading; University for International Integration of the Afro-Brazilian Lusophony; University of Campinas; Federal University of Bahia; Federal University of Rio de Janeiro |
| Cape Verde | Fundação Amílcar Cabral; Fundação Carlos Albertino Veiga; Fundação João Lopes |
| Galicia (Spain) | Galician Language Association; Galician Academy of the Portuguese Language; Galician Council of Culture; Docentes de Português na Galiza |
| Germany | Sociedade Alemã para os Países Africanos de Língua Portuguesa |
| Macau (China) | Instituto Internacional de Macau; University of São José |
| Mozambique | Fundação para o Desenvolvimento da Comunidade; Instituto Superior de Estudos de Defesa |
| Portugal | Lisbon Academy of Sciences; Assistência Médica Internacional; Associação Caboverdeana de Lisboa; Associação Portuguesa de Transporte e Trabalho Aéreo; Associação Abraço; Associação dos Ex-Deputados da Assembleia da República; Associação Saúde em Português; Plataforma Portuguesa das Organizações Não-Governamentais para o Desenvolvimento; Centro de Conciliação e Mediação de Conflitos; University of Coimbra; University of Lisbon; Fundação Bial; Fundação Calouste Gulbenkian; Champalimaud Foundation; Fundação D. Manuel II; Fundação Luso-Americana; Fundação Luso-Brasileira; Fundação Mário Soares; Fundação Oriente; Fundação Portugal-África; Ius Gentium Conimbrigae; Instituto de Higiene e Medicina Tropical; Instituto Marquês de Valle Flôr; Instituto Nacional de Saúde Dr. Ricardo Jorge; Instituto para a Promoção e Desenvolvimento da América Latina; Instituto Superior de Agronomia; Instituto Superior de Ciências Sociais e Políticas; Médicos do Mundo Portugal; Organização Paramédicos de Catástrofe Internacional; Parceria Portuguesa para Água; Lisbon Geographic Society; Sociedade Portuguesa de Hipertensão; Serviço de Utilização Comum dos Hospitais; União das Misericórdias Portuguesas; União das Mutualidades Portuguesas; Universidade Lusófona |
| São Tomé and Príncipe | Fundação Novo Futuro |
| United States | Instituto Pedro Pires de Estudos Cabo-Verdianos |
| Pan-Lusofonia | Observatório da Língua Portuguesa; União das Cidades Capitais de Língua Portuguesa; Confederação da Publicidade dos Países de Língua Portuguesa; Comunidade Médica de Língua Portuguesa; Associação dos Comités Olímpicos de Língua Oficial Portuguesa; Associação Lusófona de Energias Renováveis; Associação de Portos de Língua Oficial Portuguesa; Associação de Reguladores de Comunicações e Telecomunicações da CPLP; Associação das Universidades de Língua Portuguesa; Associação de Supervisores de Seguros Lusófonos; Círculo de Reflexão Lusófona; Comunidade Sindical dos Países de Língua Portuguesa; Confederação Empresarial da CPLP; Conselho Internacional dos Arquitetos de Língua Portuguesa; Fórum da Juventude da CPLP; Fórum das Sociedades Nacionais da Cruz Vermelha de Língua Portuguesa; Plataforma de Entidades Reguladoras da Comunicação Social dos; Países e Territórios de Língua Portuguesa; União dos Advogados de Língua Portuguesa; União Internacional de Juízes de Língua Portuguesa |

== Scope ==
The tomb of Luís de Camões is a revered space in the Lusofonia. Lusophone heads of state pay respects here on visits to Portugal.

The Portuguese-speaking countries are home to 267 million people located across the globe but having a common language, a shared history, and some cultural similarities. The CPLP nations have a combined area of about 10,742,000 square kilometres (4,148,000 sq mi), which is more than twice as large as the European Union 4,475,757 square kilometres (1,728,099 sq mi), but with a little more than half of the population.

=== Political cooperation ===
Since its formation, the CPLP has helped to solve problems in São Tomé and Príncipe and in Guinea-Bissau, because of coups d'état in those countries. The CPLP helped these two countries to take economic reforms (in the case of São Tomé) and democratic ones (in the case of Guinea-Bissau).

In the early 21st century, the leaders of the CPLP believed that peace in Angola and Mozambique, as well as Timor-Leste's independence, favored the development of the CPLP and a strengthening of multilateral cooperation.

=== Language ===
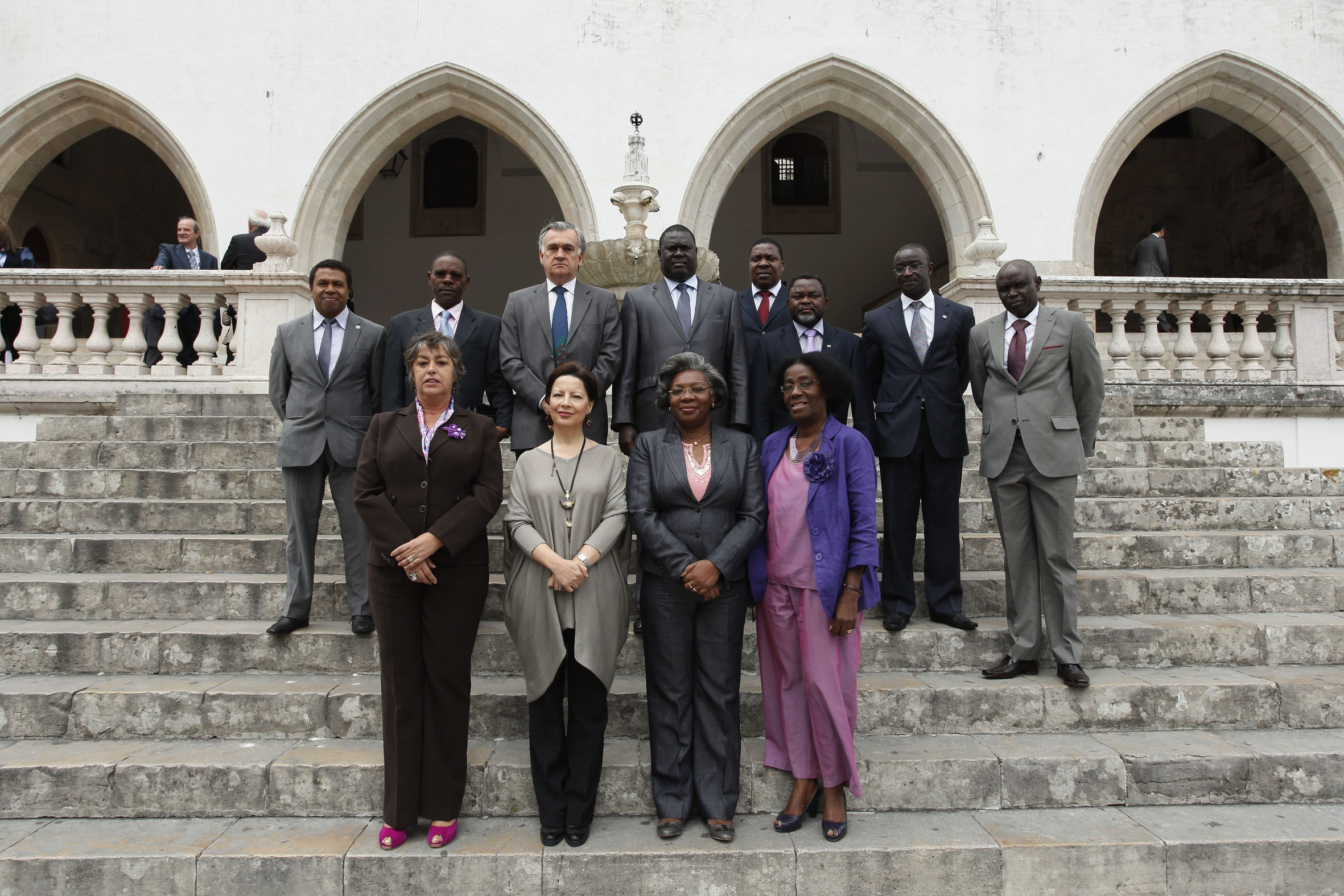
The 7th Meeting of Ministers of Culture at Sintra Palace; Portuguese Riviera, 2010.

Since many children in rural areas of Lusophone Africa and Timor-Leste are out-of-school youth, the education officials in these regions seek help from Portugal and Brazil to increase the education to spread Portuguese fluency (like establishing Instituto Camões language center branches in main cities and rural towns), as Portuguese is becoming one of the main languages in Southern Africa, where it is also taught in Namibia and South Africa.

Angola has not yet signed the most recent accord on the orthography of the Portuguese language, and has asked other PALOP countries to support it in discussions on various points of that accord with Portugal.

=== Education ===
In many developing Portuguese-speaking nations, Portuguese is the language of government and commerce which means that Portuguese-speaking people from African nations can work and communicate with others in different parts of the world, especially in Portugal and Brazil, where the economies are stronger. Many leaders of Portuguese-speaking nations in Africa are fearful that language standards do not meet the fluency required and are therefore making it compulsory in schools so that a higher degree of fluency is achieved and young Africans will be able to speak a world language that will help them later in life.

=== Lusophone Citizenship ===
Easing citizens' cross-border movement between the member states was proposed at the 2017 CPLP Summit. This proposal by Portugal and Cape Verde to Brazil was thought by some to conflict with Europe's Schengen area. However, this free movement is based on a different model: as residence permits, associated with the recognition of academic degrees and professional qualification, and maintenance of social rights including pension systems. It would henceforth establish the Lusophone citizenship, the cidadania lusófona.

== Institutions ==
=== CPLP Summits ===
Conference of Heads of State & Government of the CPLP CPLP Summit
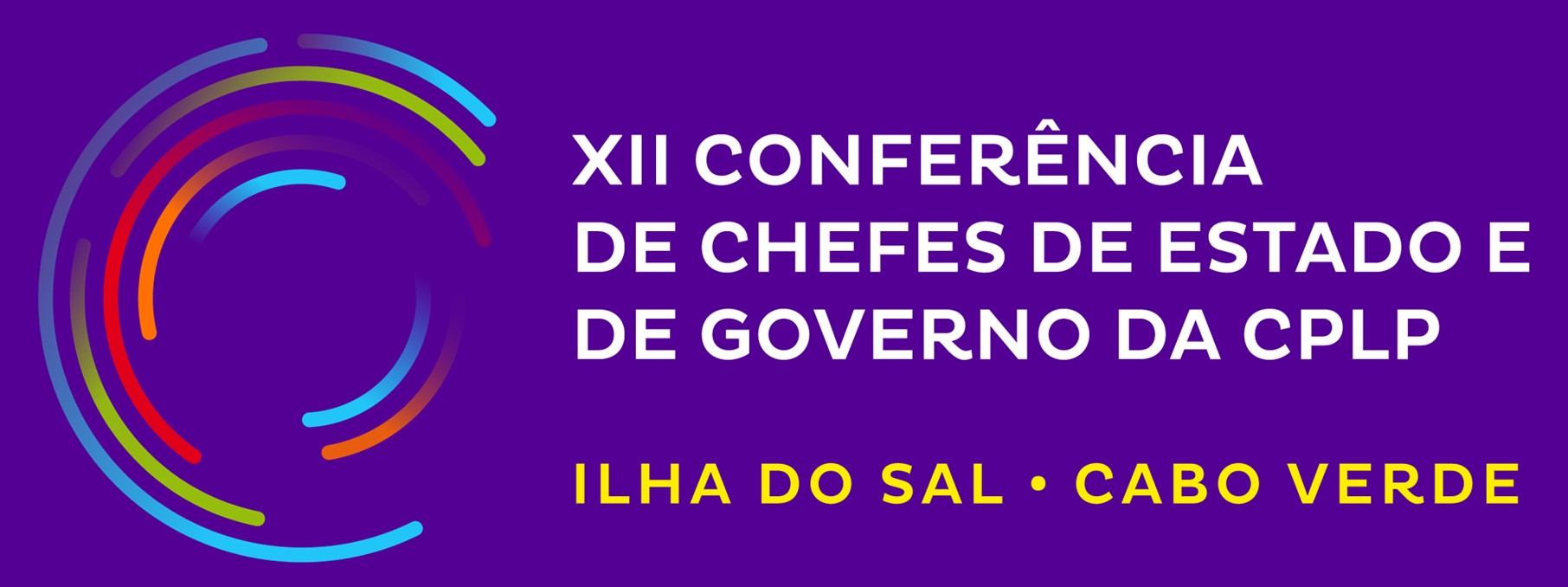
- The 12th CPLP Summit; Cape Verde, 2018.
- Host country: Rotates every two years between CPLP member states Most recent: Angola 2021
- Website: Conferência de Chefes de Estado e de Governo da CPLP

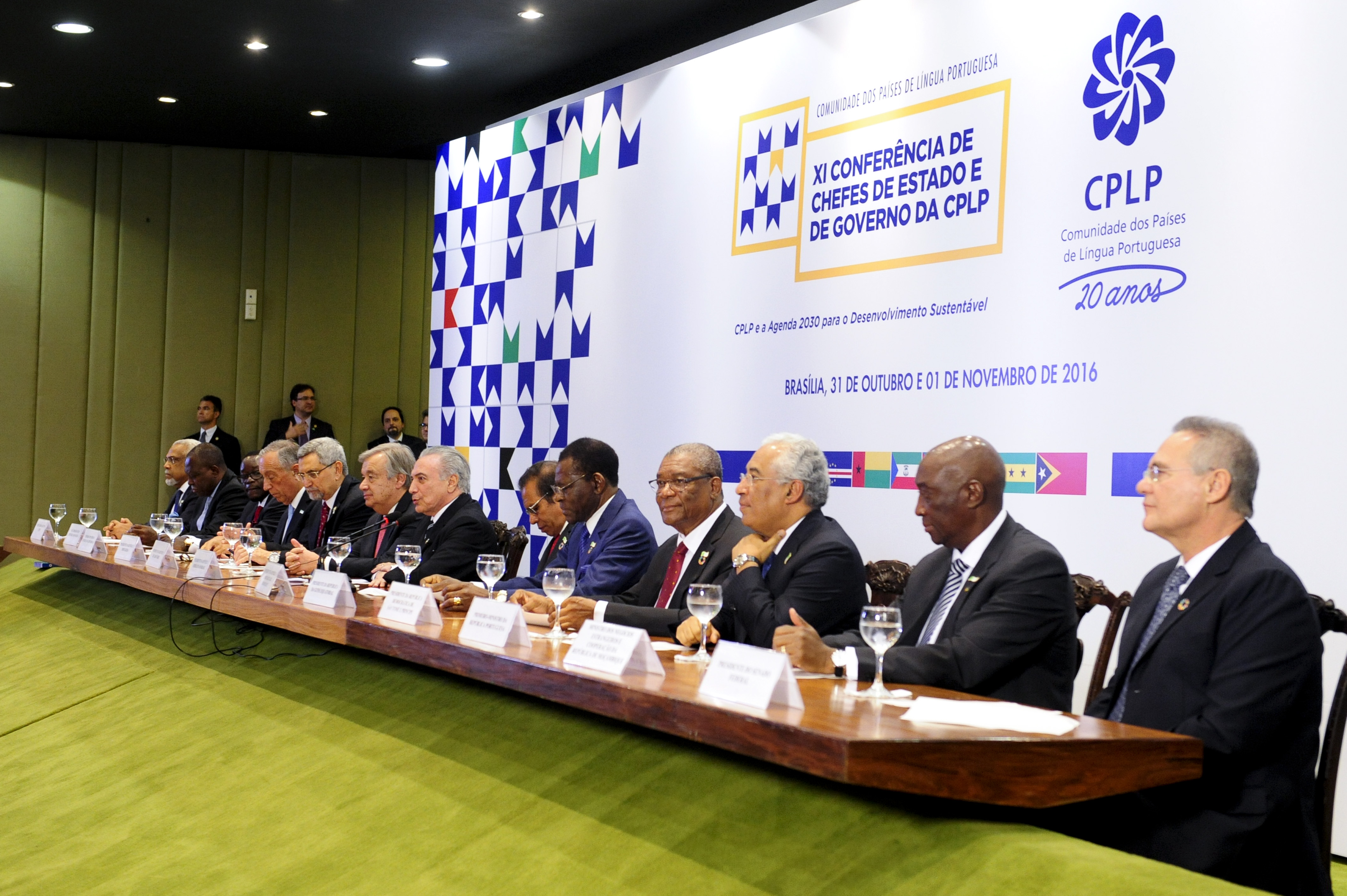
11th CPLP Summit; Brasília, Brazil, 2016.

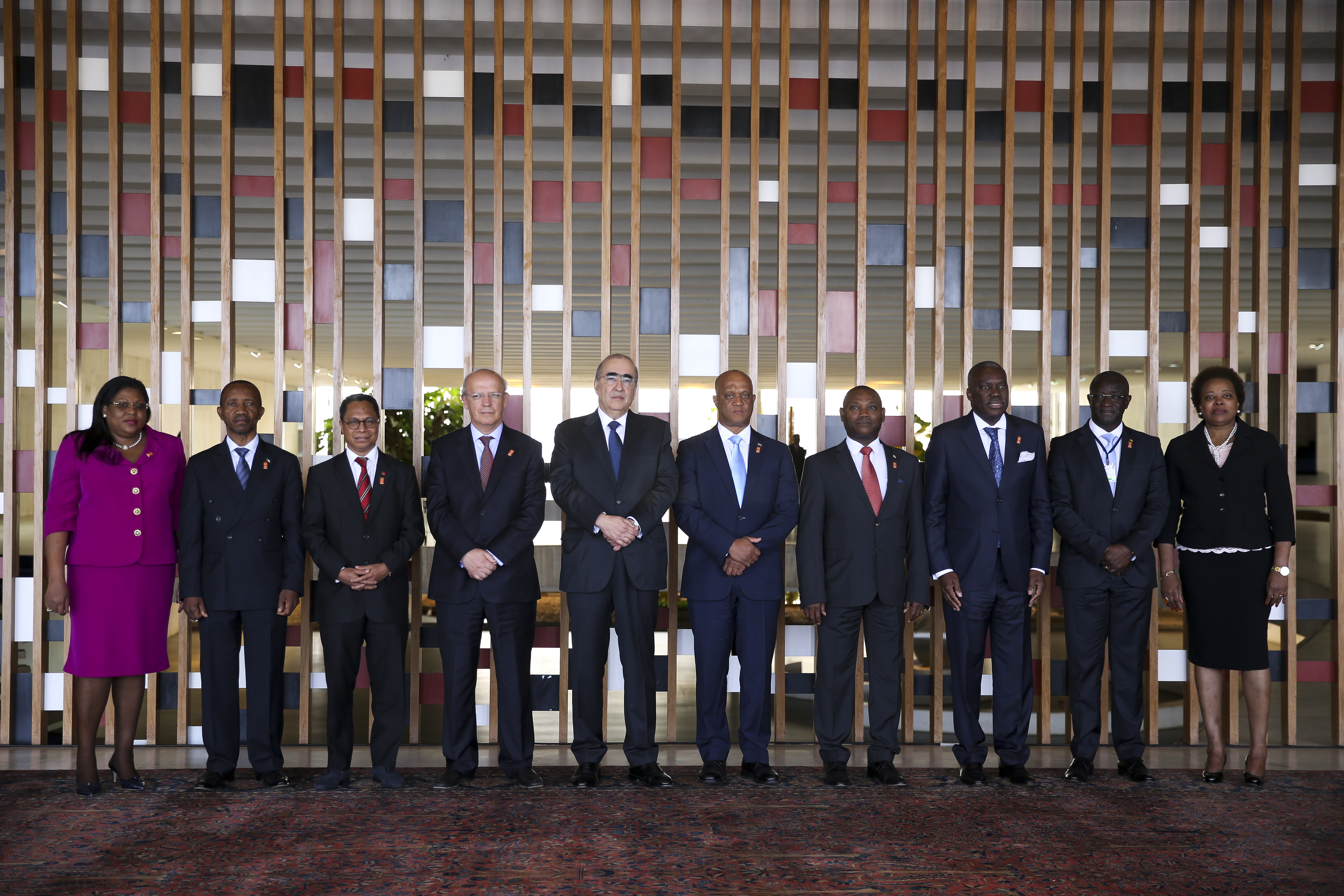
22nd Meeting of the Council of Ministers

The Conference of Heads of State and Government of the CPLP (Portuguese: Conferência de Chefes de Estado e de Governo da Comunidade dos Países de Língua Portuguesa; CCEG), commonly known as the CPLP Summit (Cimeira da CPLP) is a biennial meeting of heads of state and heads of government of the member states of the CPLP. It is considered one of the fundamental pillars of the CPLP's structure.

Objectives

The mission of the CPLP Summit is to:

- Define and focus the CPLP's strategy and general policy
- Adopt and implement the agenda agreed upon by member states
- To create institutions of the CPLP or delegate powers to the CPLP Council of Ministers
- Elect a rotating presidency of the CPLP
- Elect the CPLP Executive Secretary

Conferences of Heads of State and Government of the CPLP
| Summit | Host country | Host city | Year |
|---|---|---|---|
| I | Portugal | Lisbon | 1996 |
| II | Cape Verde | Praia | 1998 |
| III | Mozambique | Maputo | 2000 |
| IV | Brazil | Brasília | 2002 |
| V | São Tomé and Príncipe | São Tomé | 2004 |
| VI | Guinea-Bissau | Bissau | 2006 |
| VII | Portugal | Lisbon | 2008 |
| VIII | Angola | Luanda | 2010 |
| IX | Mozambique | Maputo | 2012 |
| X | Timor-Leste | Dili | 2014 |
| XI | Brazil | Brasília | 2016 |
| XII | Cape Verde | Ilha do Sal | 2018 |
| XIII | Angola | Luanda | 2021 |
| XIV | São Tomé and Príncipe | São Tomé | 2023 |

=== Minister Meetings ===
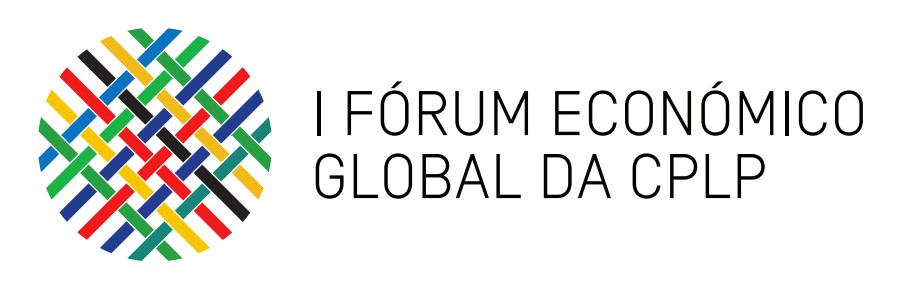
1st CPLP Global Economic Forum; 2014.

== See also ==
- Comunidade do Escutismo Lusófono;
- CPLP Games
- Geographic distribution of the Portuguese language
- Instituto Camões
- International Association of Portuguese-Speaking Communications
- Lusitanic
- Lusofonia Games
- Lusophone
- Lusophone music
- Portuguese Empire
- Portuguese language in Africa
- Portuguese language in Asia
- Portuguese-speaking African countries (PALOP)
- List of countries and territories where Portuguese is an official language
- List of international organisations which have Portuguese as an official language

By ISO 639-3 code
Enter an ISO code to find the corresponding language article.
