= Zacarias da Costa =

East Timorese politician and diplomat

His Excellency Zacarias Albano da Costa
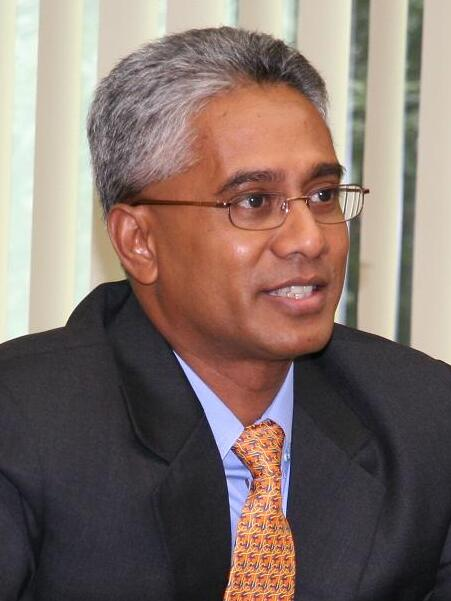
- da Costa in 2006

9th Executive Secretary of the Lusophone Commonwealth
- In office 17 July 2021 – 17 August 2025
- Preceded by: Francisco Ribeiro Telles
- Succeeded by: Maria de Fátima Monteiro Jardim

Personal details
- Born: 16 January 1964 (age 62) Remexio, Portuguese Timor (now East Timor)
- Education: Catholic University of Portugal

Zacarias Albano da Costa (born 16 January 1964, in Remexio) is an East Timorese politician and diplomat. On 8 August 2007, he became Minister of Foreign Affairs following the 2007 parliamentary election. Before being appointed as Minister for Foreign Affairs of the Democratic Republic of Timor-Leste, Minister da Costa was a Member of Parliament and Leader of the Social Democratic Party (PSD) Bench at the Parliament. In addition to his ministerial role, he is currently Chairman of the National Council of the PSD.

Professionally, Minister da Costa has worked with the Asian Development Bank (ADB) for four years as Inter-Agency Coordinator and Project Administration and Implementation Specialist. He was also a USAID Advisor on Private Sector Development Project and Head of Information Coordination and Monitoring Unit.

Prior to the Independence of Timor-Leste, the Minister was a key figure in the CNRT (National Council of Maubere Resistance) Political Committee and the Coordinating Committee for the Diplomatic Front as the Permanent Representative to the European Union and International Organizations in Geneva covering the period 1985–2000. Another key function of the Minister was the coordination of the Secretariat of the Inter Parliamentary-Group of the European Parliament for Timor-Leste.

Currently Minister da Costa holds a number of voluntary positions including National Vice-president of the Timor-Leste Red Cross and is heavily involved with NGO's and Cultural and Sporting organizations.

Minister da Costa worked as a teacher and journalist in Portugal before joining the Timorese Resistance Movement and holds a degree in Classical Humanities from the Catholic University of Portugal (UCP) and a Certificate on Human Rights from the International Institute of Human Rights, in Strasbourg (France).

Minister da Costa is married to East Timor's former UN Representative Milena Pires.

On 17 July 2021, da Costa took over as Executive Secretary of the Community of Portuguese Language Countries from Francisco Ribeiro Telles, at the Summit of Lusophony in Luanda, Angola, becoming the first East Timorese person to hold the office. At the 14th Conference in São Tomé, he was re-elected for an additional 2 years as head of the CPLP.

Preceded by José Guterres	Minister of Foreign Affairs and Cooperation of the Democratic Republic of Timor-Leste; 2007–present	Incumbent
Political offices
Preceded by Francisco Ribeiro Telles	Executive Secretary of the CPLP; 2021–present	Incumbent
