= 1st CPLP Summit =

I Conference of Heads of State & Government of the CPLP 1st CPLP Summit
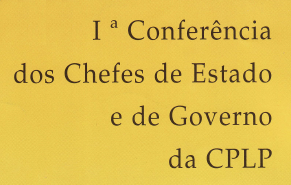
- The 1st CPLP Summit; Lisbon, .
- Host country: Portugal
- Dates: 17 July 1996
- Cities: Lisbon
- Venues: Jerónimos Monastery
- Website: I Conferência de Chefes de Estado e de Governo da CPLP

The I Conference of Heads of State and Government of the CPLP (Portuguese: I Conferência de Chefes de Estado e de Governo da CPLP), commonly known as the 1st CPLP Summit (I Cimeira da CPLP), was the 1st biennial meeting of heads of state and heads of government of the Community of Portuguese Language Countries, held at the Jerónimos Monastery in Lisbon, Portugal, on 17 July 1996.

== Outcome ==
This summit formally created the Community of Portuguese Language Countries, also known as the Lusophone Commonwealth, after two years of multilateral negotiations and planning to create an intergovernmental organization around the community of countries with Portuguese as its official language.

=== Executive Secretary ===
Marcolino Moco, former Prime Minister of Angola, was elected to serve as the inaugural Executive Secretary of the Community of Portuguese Language Countries.
