= Member states of the Community of Portuguese Language Countries =

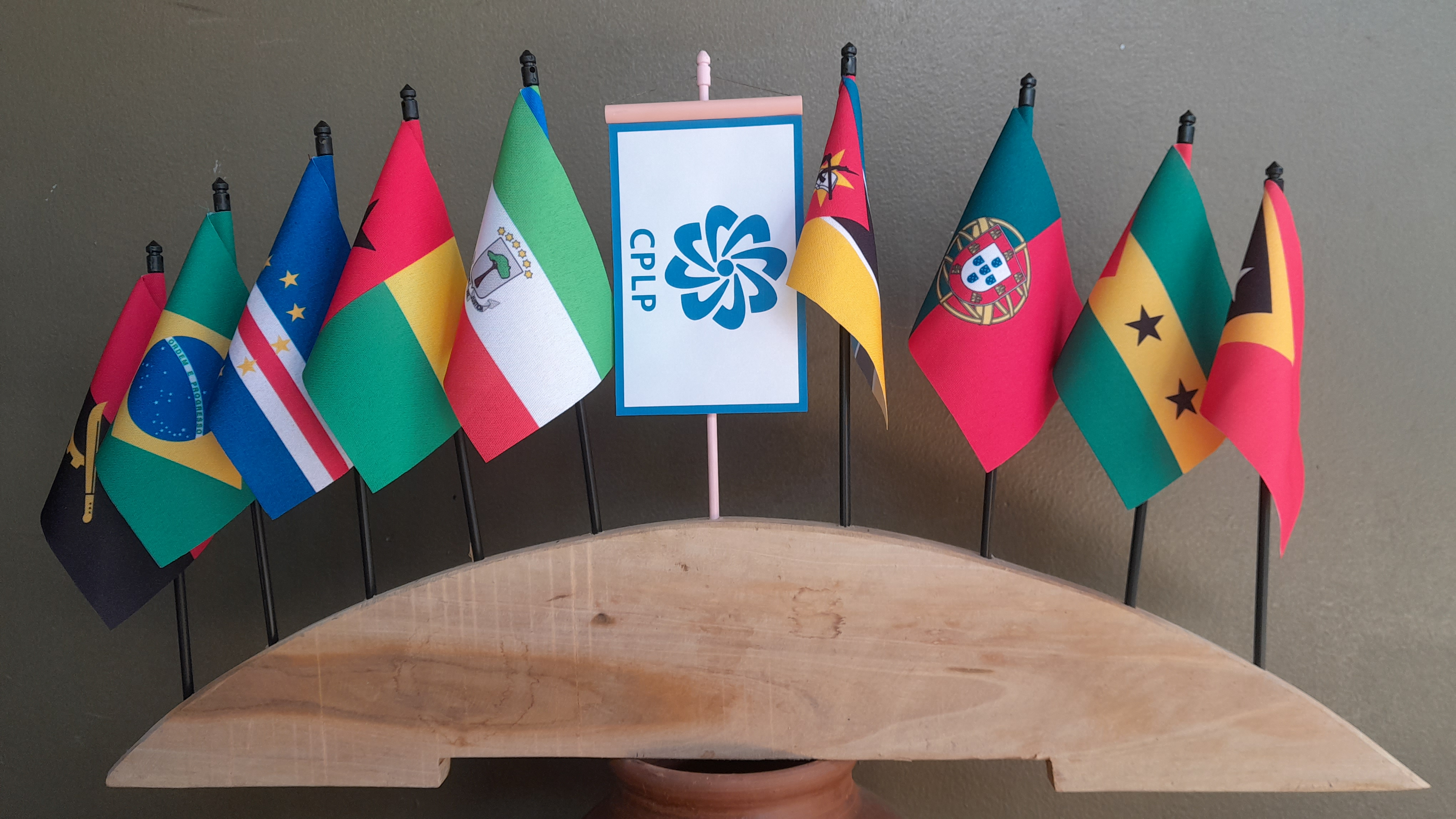
Flags of the members.

The Community of Portuguese Language Countries consists of nine member states, which list the Portuguese language as an official language, and only East Timor and Equatorial Guinea list a secondary official language (Tetun and Spanish respectively).

In 2005, during the CPLP Council of Ministers meeting in Luanda, the status of associate observer for non-member states was adopted to enhance international cooperation and achieve the Community's objectives, leading to the subsequent admission of three states.

== Members ==
| Country | Status | Year joined | Official language(s) | Continent | Population |
|---|---|---|---|---|---|
| Portugal | Member | 1996 | Portuguese | Europe | 10,347,892 |
| Brazil | Member | 1996 | Portuguese | South America | 210,147,125 |
| Angola | Member | 1996 | Portuguese | Africa | 31,127,674 |
| Mozambique | Member | 1996 | Portuguese | Africa | 30,066,648 |
| Cape Verde | Member | 1996 | Portuguese | Africa | 483,628 |
| São Tomé and Príncipe | Member | 1996 | Portuguese | Africa | 211,028 |
| Timor-Leste | Member | 2002 | Portuguese and Tetum | Asia | 1,340,513 |
| Equatorial Guinea | Member | 2014 | Portuguese, Spanish and French | Africa | 1,454,789 |

== Suspended members ==
| Country | Status | Year joined | Year of suspension | Official language(s) | Continent | Population |
|---|---|---|---|---|---|---|
| Guinea-Bissau | Suspended member (Note: Due to the coup d'etat.) | 1996 | 2025 | Portuguese | Africa | 1,726,000 |

== Observers ==
| Country | Status | Year joined | Official language(s) | Continent | Population |
|---|---|---|---|---|---|
| Mauritius | associate observer | 2006 | None (de jure) (Note: English and French (de facto).) | Africa | 1,265,475 |
| Senegal | associate observer | 2008 | French | Africa | 15,854,323 |
| Georgia | associate observer | 2014 | Georgian | Asia/Europe | 4,012,104 |
| Japan | associate observer | 2014 | Japanese | Asia | 125,470,000 |
| Namibia | associate observer | 2014 | English | Africa | 2,550,226 |
| Turkey | associate observer | 2014 | Turkish | Asia/Europe | 83,614,362 |
| Czech Republic | associate observer | 2016 | Czech | Europe | 10,701,777 |
| Hungary | associate observer | 2016 | Hungarian | Europe | 9,730,000 |
| Slovakia | associate observer | 2016 | Slovak | Europe | 5,464,060 |
| Uruguay | associate observer | 2016 | Spanish | South America | 3,518,552 |
| Andorra | associate observer | 2018 | Catalan | Europe | 77,543 |
| Argentina | associate observer | 2018 | Spanish | South America | 44,938,712 |
| Chile | associate observer | 2018 | Spanish | South America | 17,574,003 |
| France | associate observer | 2018 | French | Europe | 67,522,000 |
| Italy | associate observer | 2018 | Italian | Europe | 60,317,116 |
| Luxembourg | associate observer | 2018 | Luxembourgish, German and French | Europe | 633,622 |
| Serbia | associate observer | 2018 | Serbian | Europe | 6,926,705 |
| United Kingdom | associate observer | 2021 | English | Europe | 67,081,234 |
| Canada | associate observer | 2021 | English and French | North America | 38,048,738 |
| Greece | associate observer | 2021 | Greek | Europe | 10,718,565 |
| India (Note: Part of India was former Portuguese colony (see Portuguese India).) | associate observer | 2021 | Hindi and English | Asia | 1,352,642,280 |
| Ireland | associate observer | 2021 | English and Irish | Europe | 4,977,400 |
| Ivory Coast | associate observer | 2021 | French | Africa | 26,378,274 |
| Qatar | associate observer | 2021 | Arabic | Asia | 2,795,484 |
| Spain | associate observer | 2021 | Spanish | Europe | 47,450,795 |
| Peru | associate observer | 2021 | Spanish | South America | 32,824,358 |
| Romania | associate observer | 2021 | Romanian | Europe | 19,317,984 |
| United States | associate observer | 2021 | None | North America | 331,449,281 |
| Paraguay | associate observer | 2023 | Spanish and Guarani | South America | 7,439,863 |

== Officially interested countries and territories ==
| Country/Territory | Interested Status | Official language | Continent | Population | Reference | Possible date of discussion | Notes |
|---|---|---|---|---|---|---|---|
| Morocco | associate member | Amazigh and Arabic | Africa | 33,757,175 | | 2010 – VIII CPLP Summit – (Angola) Luanda | Some areas of Morocco colonized by Portugal, proximity to the Autonomous Region of Madeira. |
| Philippines | associate member | Filipino and English | Asia | 90,500,000 | | 2010 – VIII CPLP Summit – (Angola) Luanda | Historical ties to the expedition of Ferdinand Magellan |
| Venezuela | associate member | Spanish | South America | 26,814,843 | | 2012 – IX CPLP Summit | Largest Portuguese community in Hispanic America |
| Croatia | associate member | Croatian | Europe | 4,453,500 | | 2012 – IX CPLP Summit | Large number of Portuguese and Brazilian expats |
| Taiwan (ROC) | associate member | Mandarin | Asia | 23,855,010 | | In negotiations | |
| Ukraine | associate member | Ukrainian | Europe | 46,372,700 | | 2012 – IX CPLP Summit | Has migratory fluxes with Portugal |
| Indonesia | associate member | Indonesian | Asia | 237,512,352 | | In negotiations | Portugal was the major colonial power until Dutch hegemony (see Portuguese Empire in the Indonesian Archipelago). Occupied East Timor from 1975–2002. |
| Eswatini | associate member | English and Siwati | Africa | 1,185,000 | | In negotiations | Shares a border with Mozambique with which it has economic ties |
| Australia | associate member | English | Oceania | 22,420,039 | | In negotiations | "Discovered" by Portuguese navigators. Has a large community of Portuguese, Brazilian and East Timorese expats |
| Russia | associate member | Russian | Europe and Asia | 145,912,025 | | In negotiations | |
| (Galicia (Spain)) Galicia (Note: Spanish autonomous community) | member | Galician and Spanish | Europe | 2,783,100 | | Pending Spanish government approval | Strong cultural, historical, and linguistic ties with Portugal |
| Macau (Note: Chinese special administrative region) | member | Portuguese and Chinese (Cantonese) | Asia | 520,400 | | Pending Macanese Government approval | Chinese territory formerly under Portuguese administration and a small minority population is Portuguese |
| Malacca (Note: Malaysian state) | associate member | Malay | Asia | 733,000 | | Pending Malaysian Government approval | Portuguese colony for more than a century, small minority population of Portuguese descent |
| South Korea | associate member | Korean | Asia | 51,305,186 | | In negotiations | |
| Germany | associate observer | German | Europe | 84,079,811 | | In negotiations | |
