= Angola–Italy relations =

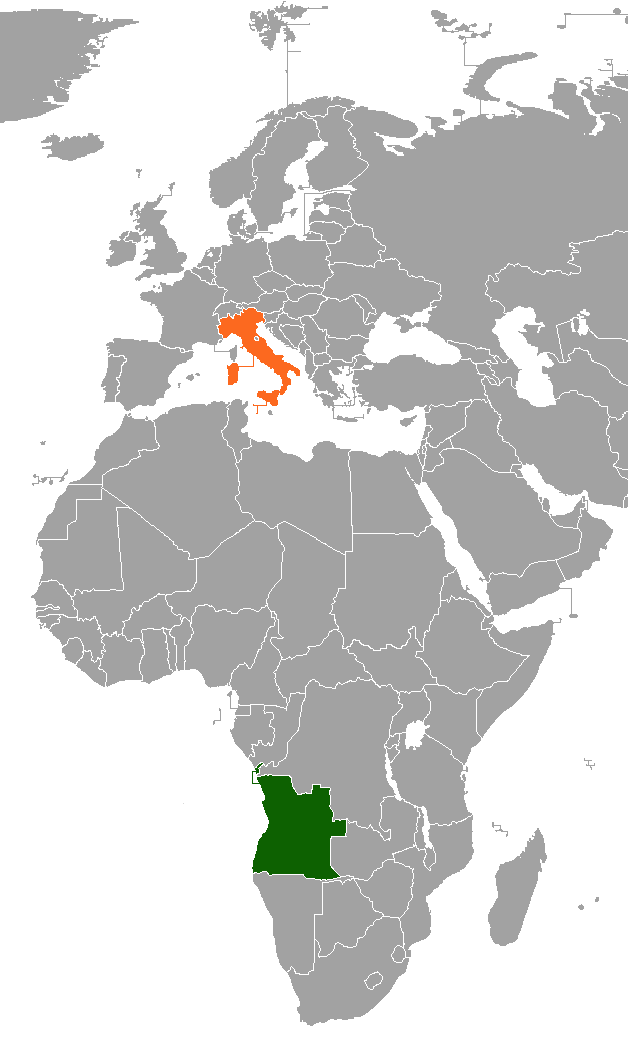
- Angola: Italy

Diplomatic mission
- Embassy of Angola, Rome: Embassy of Italy, Luanda

Envoy
- Ambassador Maria de Fátima Monteiro Jardim: Ambassador Cristiano Gallo

Angola–Italy relations are the bilateral relations between Angola and Italy. Formal diplomatic relations between the two nations were established on 4 June 1976, shortly after Angola gained independence from Portugal on November 11, 1975.

== History ==
On 18 February 1976, following the Angolan War of Independence, Italy became the first country of the Western Bloc to recognize the newly-formed Republic of Angola. Formal diplomatic relations were established on June 4, 1976.

In the years following the establishment of diplomatic relations, Italy and Angola signed several agreements to strengthen their bilateral cooperation. On April 10, 1976, the Air Transport Agreement was signed to facilitate air connectivity between the two countries. On August 3, 1977, both nations entered into a Technical Cooperation Agreement and a Memorandum of Intent, which led to the creation of a Joint Commission aimed at fostering collaboration in various sectors.

Throughout the Angolan Civil War, Italy maintained diplomatic relations with Angola and continued its engagement through humanitarian efforts. Italian non-governmental organizations, universities and missionaries were active in Angola during this period.

In recent years, Italy and Angola have worked to deepen their partnership. High-level visits and the signing of various agreements have strengthened bilateral relations.

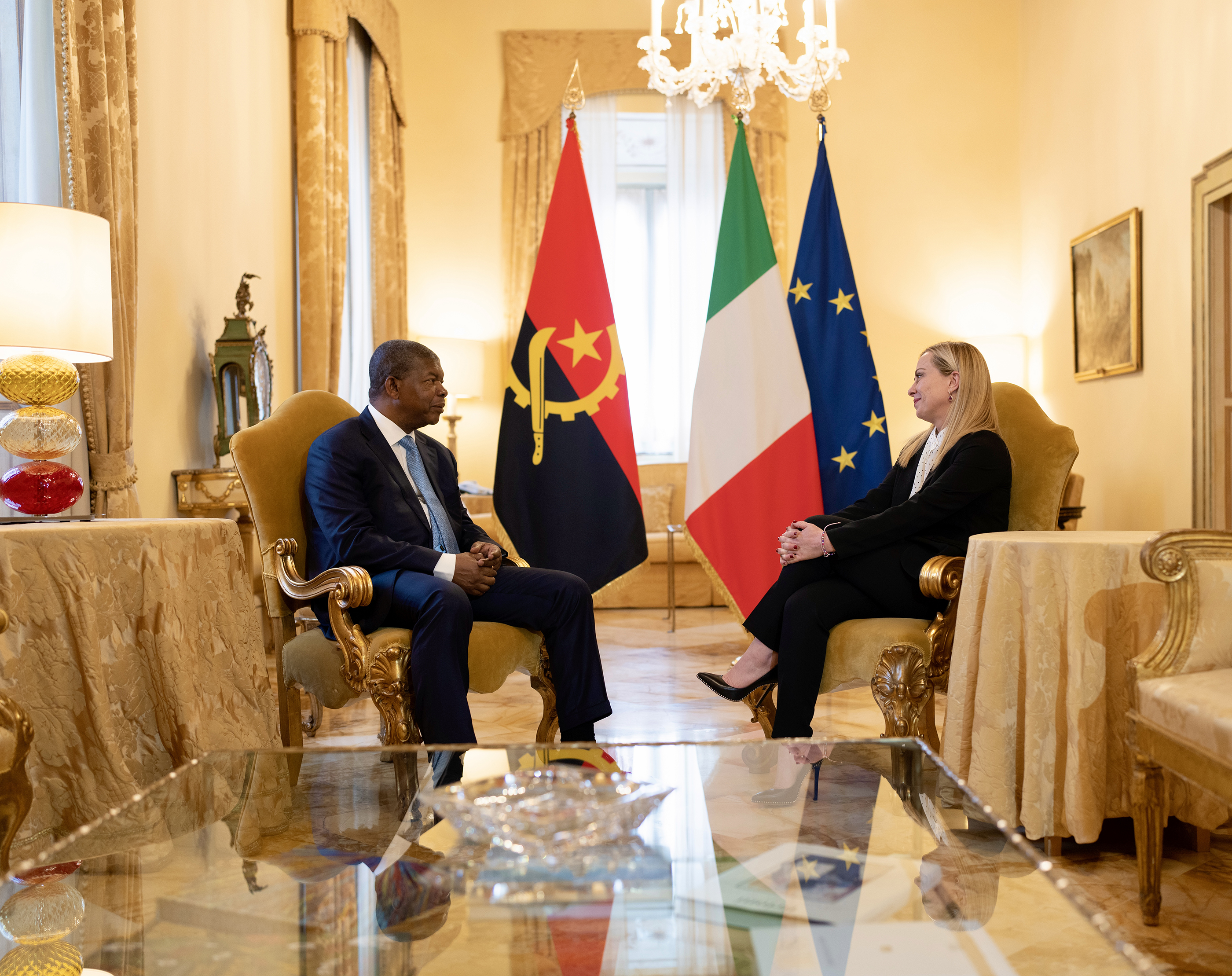
Italian Prime Minister Giorgia Meloni meets with Angolan President João Lourenço on May 24, 2024.

In May 2023, Angolan President João Lourenço met Italian Prime Minister Giorgia Meloni, where he emphasized that Italy is an "essential partner," particularly in the areas of trade and business.

== Economic relations ==
Angola is the third largest commercial partner for Italy in Subsaharan Africa. Among the Italian companies operating in Angola are Eni and Saipem in the oil sector, and Maire Tecnimont in the renewable energy sector. In 2022 the total volume of trade between the two countries reached a decade-high of € 1.8 billion. Exports from Angola amounted to €1.5 billion, most of which (93.2%) were crude oil exports, while the value of exports from Italy was €368 million.

In 2023 bilateral trade between Angola and Italy totaled approximately $1.4 billion, with Angola exporting around $800 million in goods and importing roughly $588 million from Italy. Angola's exports to Italy remained overwhelmingly dominated by crude petroleum, which accounted for over 97% of the total export value. Conversely, Italy's exports to Angola continued to be significantly diversified. Gas turbines ($46.6 million) were the top Italian export, alongside other machinery and manufactured goods.

== Defense cooperation ==
Italy and Angola have established a framework for defense cooperation, formalized through agreements such as Law No. 11 of January 25, 2017, which ratified a 2013 bilateral agreement to facilitate collaboration in areas including military training, logistics, and defense technology.

In recent years, Italy has expressed interest in expanding military cooperation with Angola, particularly in maritime security, aviation, and training. Italian defense companies, such as Leonardo S.p.A., have explored partnerships to support Angola's capabilities in areas that include aerospace, defense, and cybersecurity.

== Italian diaspora ==
The humanitarian and evangelizing work of missionaries, as well as the presence of a solid Italian community, were significant during Portuguese Angola and continued to be so even after Angola's independence.

== Diplomatic missions ==
The Italian Embassy to Angola is located in Luanda, and was established in July 2004. The Angolan Embassy to Italy is located in Rome.

== Notes ==
- The Embassy of Angola in Rome is accredited to Albania, Cyprus, Greece, Malta and San Marino.
- The Embassy of Italy in Luanda is accredited to São Tomé and Príncipe.

== See also ==
- Foreign relations of Angola
- Foreign relations of Italy
