= Maria de Fátima Monteiro Jardim =

Angolan politician

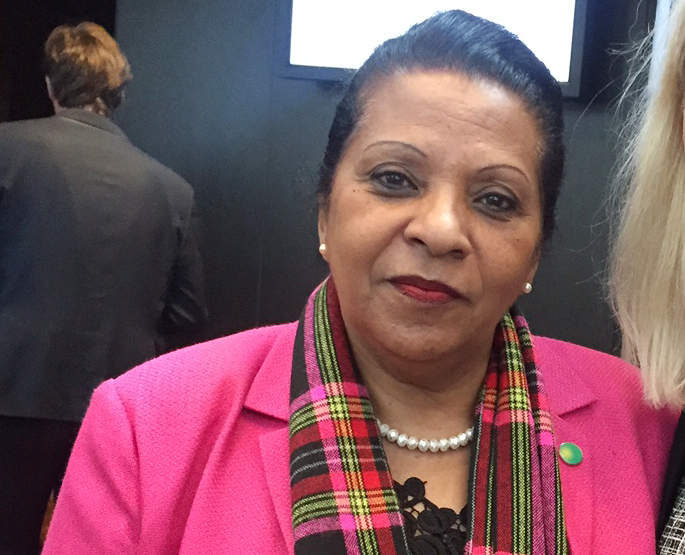
- Monteiro Jardim in 2015

10th Executive Secretary of the Lusophone Commonwealth
- Incumbent
- Assumed office 18 August 2025

Ambassador of Angola to Albania
- Incumbent
- Assumed office 4 March 2023

Ambassador of Angola to Malta
- Incumbent
- Assumed office 27 May 2021

Ambassador of Angola to Italy
- In office 21 June 2019 – 7 March 2025

Minister of the Environment
- In office 6 September 2008 – 26 August 2017
- President: José Eduardo dos Santos
- In office 3 June 1996 – 6 December 2002
- President: José Eduardo dos Santos
- Prime Minister: Fernando José de França Dias Van-Dúnem

Minister for Fisheries
- In office 27 August 1992 – 6 December 2002
- President: José Eduardo dos Santos
- Prime Minister: Marcolino Moco; Fernando José de França Dias Van-Dúnem

Member of the National Assembly
- In office 6 December 2002 – 6 September 2008

Personal details
- Born: Maria de Fátima Monteiro Jardim Luanda, Portuguese Angola, Portugal
- Party: MPLA
- Education: University of Lisbon
- Occupation: Biologist • Diplomat • Politician

Maria de Fátima Monteiro Jardim is an Angolan politician and diplomat.

She was the Angolan minister for fisheries from 1992 to 1996, in the government of José Eduardo dos Santos, then minister for fisheries and environment from 1996 to 2002. Jardim was member of the National Assembly from 2002 to 2008.

From 2008 to 2017 she was appointed minister for the environment. In 2015, she was Angola's climate envoy at COP 21, representing the Least Developed Countries in the negotiations that led to the Paris Agreement.

She was the ambassador of Angola to Italy between 2019 and 2025. She is as well ambassador to Malta since 2021 and to Albania since 2023.

Since 2025 she has also been the Executive Secretary of the Community of Portuguese Language Countries.

== See also ==
- Politics of Angola
