= Francisco Ribeiro Telles =

Portuguese diplomat

His Excellency Francisco Ribeiro Telles
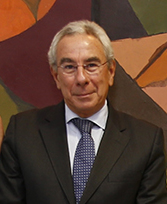

8th Executive Secretary of the Lusophone Commonwealth
- In office 1 January 2019 – 17 July 2021
- Preceded by: Maria do Carmo Silveira
- Succeeded by: Zacarias da Costa

Personal details
- Born: 10 May 1953 (age 73) Lisbon, Portugal
- Education: University of Lisbon

Francisco Maria de Sousa Ribeiro Telles GCIH • GOM • GCM (born 10 May 1953) is a Portuguese diplomat, who served as the Executive Secretary of the Community of Portuguese Language Countries, also known as the Lusophone Commonwealth, from January 2019 until July 2021.

== Career ==
Telles Ribeiro served as Portuguese Ambassador to Cabo Verde (2002-2006), Portuguese Ambassador to Angola (2007-2012), Portuguese Ambassador to Brazil (2012-2016) and Portuguese Ambassador to Italy (2016-2018).

Political offices
Preceded by Maria do Carmo Silveira	Executive Secretary of the CPLP; 2019–2021	Succeeded by Zacarias da Costa
