= Maria do Carmo Silveira =

Prime Minister of São Tomé and Príncipe from 2005 to 2006

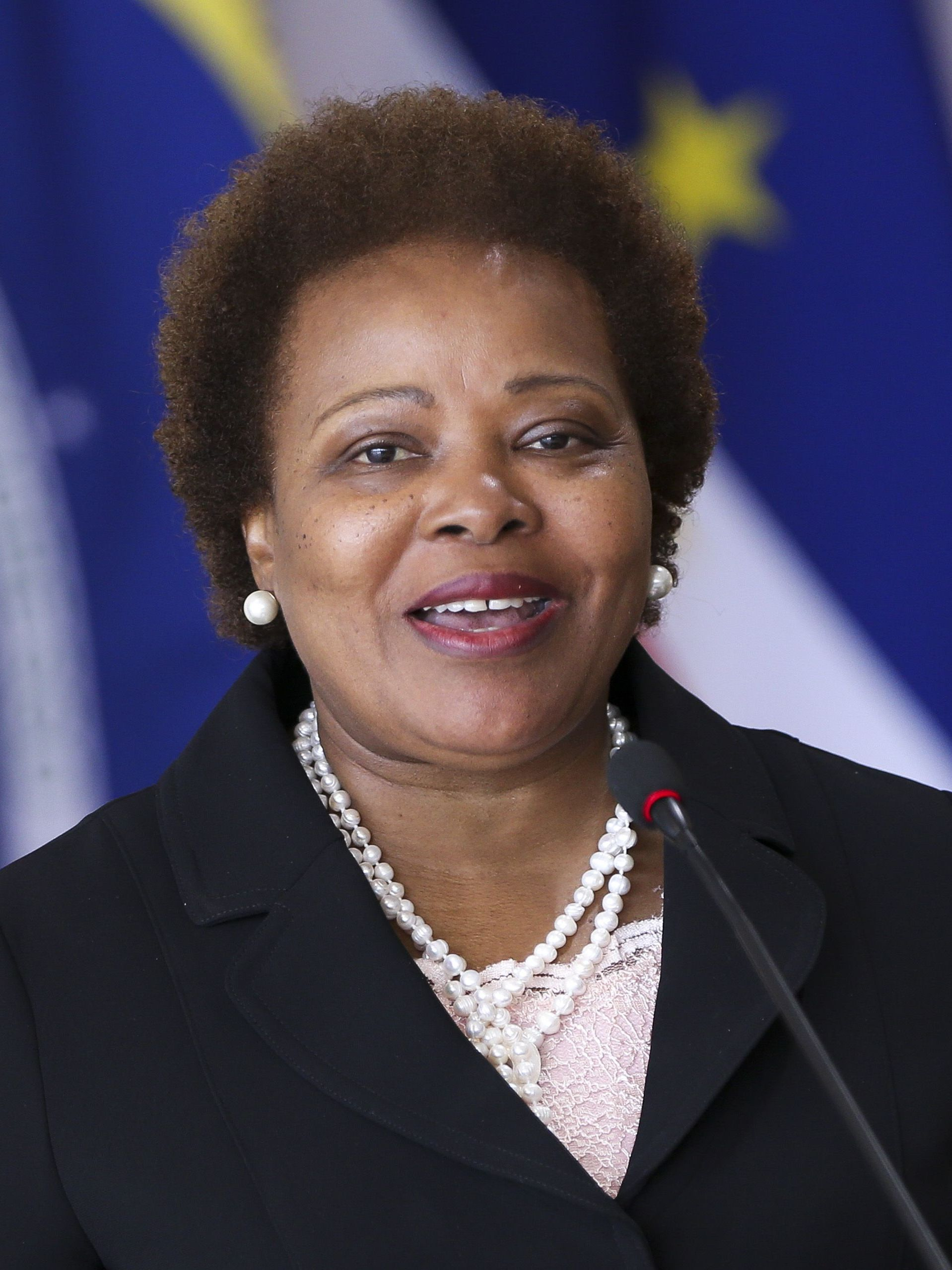
- Silveira in 2017

7th Executive Secretary of the Lusophone Commonwealth
- In office 9 January 2017 – 1 January 2019
- Preceded by: Murade Isaac Murargy
- Succeeded by: Francisco Ribeiro Telles

13th Prime Minister of São Tomé and Príncipe
- In office 8 June 2005 – 21 April 2006
- President: Fradique de Menezes
- Preceded by: Damião Vaz d'Almeida
- Succeeded by: Tomé Vera Cruz

Personal details
- Born: 14 February 1961 (age 65) Portuguese São Tomé and Príncipe
- Party: Social Democratic Party
- Education: Donetsk National University

Maria do Carmo Trovoada Pires de Carvalho Silveira (born 14 February 1961) is a São Toméan politician who served as the 13th prime minister of São Tomé and Príncipe from 8 June 2005 to 21 April 2006.

== Background ==
She was educated as an economist at the Donetsk National University (Ukraine), Master of Public Administration from the National School of Administration in Strasbourg and was the third governor of São Tomé and Príncipe's Central Bank from 1999 to 2005, she succeeded Carlos Quaresma Batista de Sousa and was succeeded by Arlindo Afonso Carvalho and again from 2011 to 2016 as the sixth governor succeeding Luís Fernando Moreira de Sousa.

== Prime minister ==
She served as Prime Minister and Minister of Planning and Finance São Tomé and Príncipe from 8 June 2005 to 21 April 2006.

Silveira, the country's second female prime minister, is a member of the Movement for the Liberation of São Tomé and Príncipe-Social Democratic Party (MLSTP-PSD) and was a member of the party executive board.

Silveira declared that macroeconomic stability was her priority and made her mark by among others resolving the wage dispute with the unions in the public sector, securing assistance from the IMF and obtaining an agreement with Angola on cooperation in the oil sector.

== Succession ==
Her term as prime minister ended after the 2006 parliamentary elections, when the opposition defeated the MLSTP-PSD, and she was succeeded as prime minister by Tomé Vera Cruz in 2006.

== Executive Secretary of the CPLP ==
In January 2017, Maria do Carmo assumed the position of Executive Secretary of the Lusophone Commonwealth, succeeding the Mozambican Murade Murargy and being succeeded by the Portuguese Francisco Ribeiro Telles in January 2019.

== See also ==
- Politics of São Tomé and Príncipe

Government offices
Preceded by Carlos Quaresma Batista de Sousa	Governor of the Central Bank of São Tomé and Príncipe; 1999–2006	Succeeded by Arlindo Afonso Carvalho
Preceded by Arlindo Afonso Carvalho	Governor of the Central Bank of São Tomé and Príncipe; 2011–present	Incumbent
Political offices
Preceded by Damião Vaz d'Almeida	Prime Minister of São Tomé and Príncipe; 2005–2006	Succeeded by Tomé Vera Cruz
Preceded by Murade Isaac Murargy	Executive Secretary of the CPLP; 2017–2019	Succeeded by Francisco Ribeiro Telles
