= Domingos Simões Pereira =

Prime Minister of Guinea-Bissau from 2014 to 2015

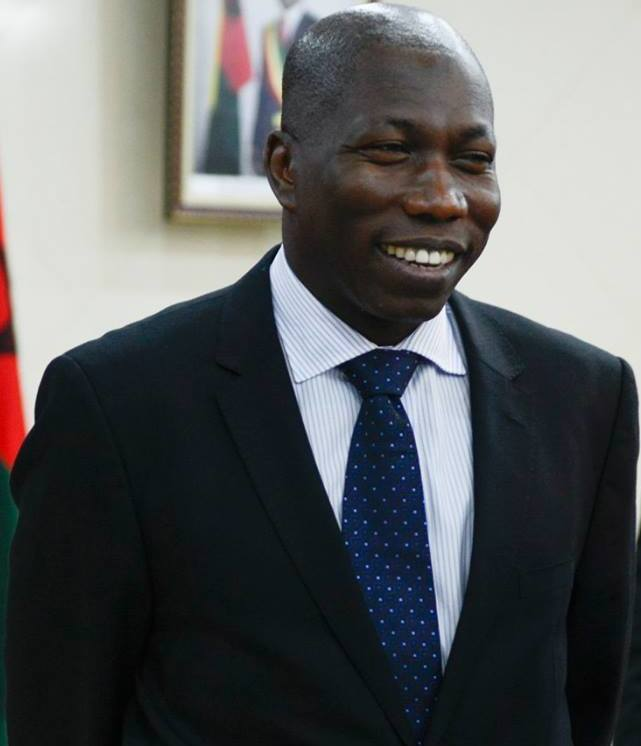
- Simões Pereira in 2015

16th Prime Minister of Guinea-Bissau
- In office 3 July 2014 – 20 August 2015
- President: José Mário Vaz
- Preceded by: Rui Duarte de Barros (Acting)
- Succeeded by: Baciro Djá

President of the National People's Assembly
- In office 27 July 2023 – 4 December 2023
- Preceded by: Cipriano Cassamá

5th Executive Secretary of the Lusophone Commonwealth
- In office 25 July 2008 – 20 July 2012
- Preceded by: Luís de Matos Monteiro da Fonseca
- Succeeded by: Murade Isaac Murargy

Leader of the African Party for the Independence of Guinea and Cape Verde
- Incumbent
- Assumed office 9 February 2014
- Preceded by: Carlos Gomes

Personal details
- Born: 20 October 1963 (age 62) Farim, Portuguese Guinea (now Guinea-Bissau)
- Party: African Party for the Independence of Guinea and Cape Verde
- Children: Anthony Simões Pereira; Nisalda Simões Pereira; Domingos Simões Pereira Jr.

Domingos Simões Pereira (born 20 October 1963) is a Bissau-Guinean politician who was Prime Minister of Guinea-Bissau from 2014 to August 2015. He previously served as Executive Secretary of the Community of Portuguese Language Countries, also known as the Lusophone Commonwealth, from 2008 to 2012.

== Early life ==
Born in Farim on October 20, 1963, Domingos Simões Pereira is the son of a farmer, a small landowner forced to abandon the property due to the beginning of the war of independence. His father was even arrested by the International and State Defense Police (PIDE), accused of collaboration with nationalist groups.

Still a child, he went, with the rest of his family, to Bissau and, soon after, in 1969, to Cacheu, where he attended primary school.

== Academic and professional career ==
In 1974, he joined the first groups of students who, at National Lyceum Kwame N'Krumah, under the teaching of names like Atchutchi Ferreira and Helder Proença, studied without the tutelage of the colonial regime. It was at the high school that, in 1979, he became a staff of the African Youth Amílcar Cabral (JAAC), youth wing of the PAIGC.

With the completion of high school education, he is selected as a militant teacher, which he takes on for the evening course, while, during the day, he teaches mathematics at the then Professional Technical Training Center and at the School of Health Technicians (Nursing).

In 1982, he received a training scholarship to the Soviet Union, where he graduated in civil and industrial engineering from the Odessa National Polytechnic University (1988). In Odessa, she is a member of the Guinea-Bissau student association.

In 1988, after 2 months in Bissau as an engineer at the Ministry of Public Works, he left for Cacheu to work at Cooperativa Unidade e Progresso (CUP), one of the largest construction companies at the time. He managed to climb the ranks in the company, becoming deputy general director of CUP in 1990.

In 1990 he entered the first cycle of formation of the PAIGC aiming at the democratic opening, and in this period his proximity to the top management of the party is worth the opportunity to continue his studies.

In 1990 he won a master's scholarship abroad and, until 1994, he remained in the United States, at the California State University, Fresno, where he completed the Master's program in Technical Sciences of Civil Engineering in the specialty of structures. Between 2013 and 2016 he received a doctorate in political science and international relations from the Catholic University of Portugal.

== Politics ==
Domingos Pereira returned to Guinea-Bissau in July 1994, and followed the last days of the electoral campaign for the country's first multi-party elections. Minister Alberto Lima Gomes invited him to reinstate the staff of the Ministry of Public Works, where he became National Director of Road and Land Transportation and Roads and Bridges. With the rise of Francisco Fadul to the post of prime minister, he left the government.

In 1998, he was part of the Support Cell for the National Authorizing Officer of the European Development Fund and, being in charge of the infrastructure dossier, and; a year later he joined the World Bank staff for the Guinean Private Sector Rehabilitation and Development Project, where he stayed until 2004.

With the victory of PAIGC, he was called to the government and became Minister of Public Works between 2004 and 2005. He then accepted the invitation of the bishops of the Catholic Church of Guinea-Bissau to address Caritas of Guinea-Bissau as secretary-general.

From December 2006 to 2014 he was an advisor to the Prime Minister of Guinea-Bissau for infrastructures under the responsibility of the World Bank, dealing with transport and communications, namely the renegotiation of telecommunications concession contracts, ports and air agreement with Portugal; it also assists the government in structuring the regulatory agency and in licensing the first cell phone license in the country.

At the 7th PAIGC Ordinary Congress, held in Gabu, in June 2008, he was elected a member of the permanent commission of the PAIGC Political Bureau, continuing to fulfill the mission conferred months before by the President of the Republic, to serve as CPLP Executive Secretary. During the four-year term, he bet on the organization's affirmation at the international level and with civil society; developed concrete partnership and cooperation actions in the most varied domains; he did not neglect the importance of Portuguese and the culture that unites and diversifies the identity of the peoples of the CPLP.

In February 2014, at the 8th PAIGC Ordinary Congress in Cacheu, he was elected to the leadership of the party; between 3 July 2014 and 20 August 2015, he served as Prime Minister of Guinea-Bissau.

In 2023, Pereira moved to Portugal following the dissolution of parliament by president Umaro Sissoco Embaló. In 2025, he announced his intention to run for president in the 2025 Guinea-Bissau general election, the fourth time he has run for the office. After the PAIGC was barred from fielding a presidential candidate, Pereira endorsed Fernando Dias da Costa. Following the election, Pereira was arrested during the 2025 Guinea-Bissau coup d'état. He was released in January 2026 but was placed under house arrest. He refused offers by the junta to take part in the transitional government.

Political offices
Preceded by Rui Duarte de Barros; Acting	Prime Minister of Guinea-Bissau; 2014–2015	Succeeded by Baciro Djá
Preceded by Luís de Matos Monteiro da Fonseca	Executive Secretary of the CPLP; 2008–2012	Succeeded by Murade Isaac Murargy
