= Murade Isaac Murargy =

Mozambican politician

His Excellency Murade Isaac Murargy
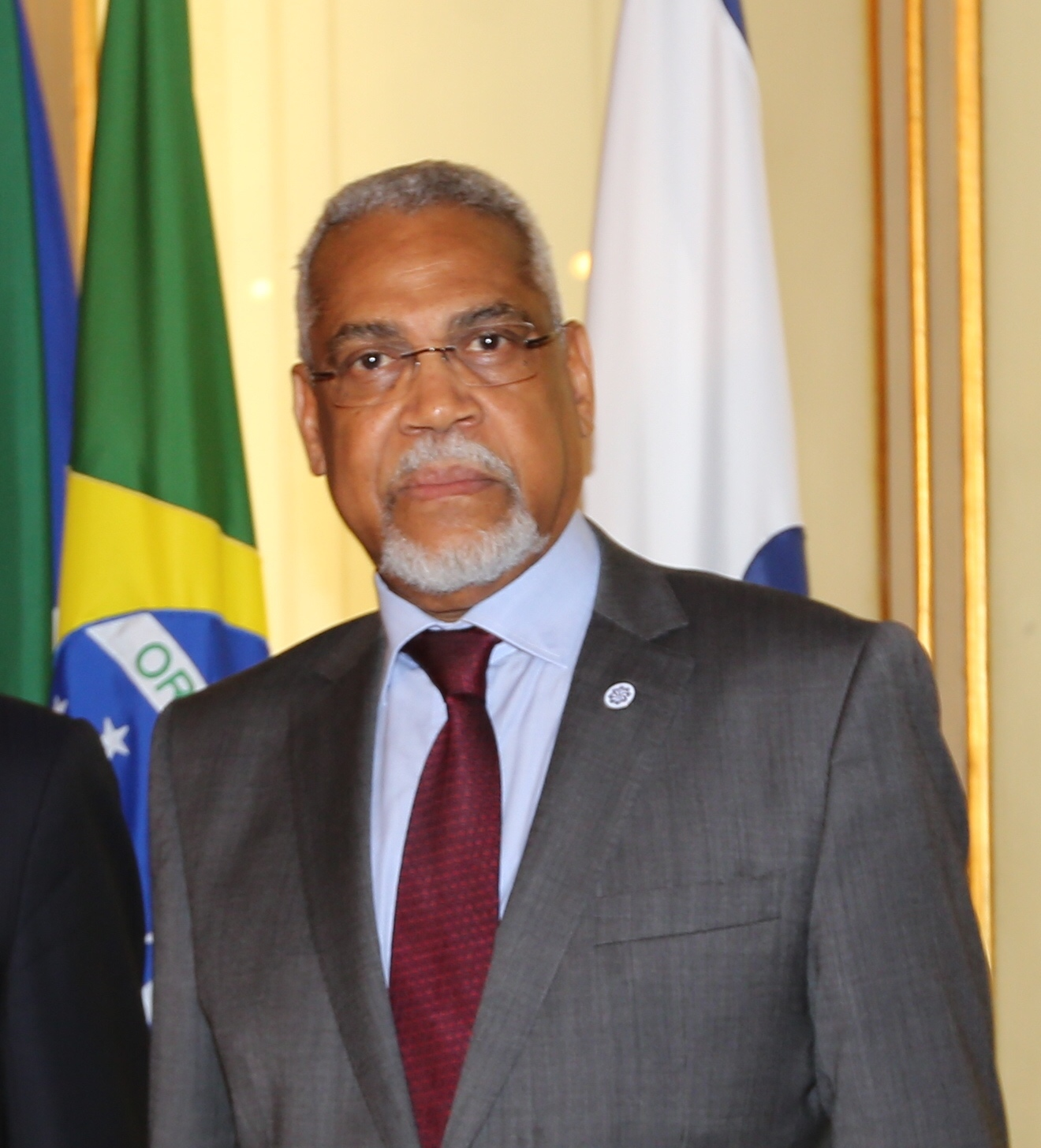

6th Executive Secretary of the Lusophone Commonwealth
- In office 20 July 2012 – 9 January 2017
- Preceded by: Domingos Simões Pereira
- Succeeded by: Maria do Carmo Silveira

Secretary-General of the Presidency of Mozambique
- In office 1995–2005
- President: Joaquim Chissano

Personal details
- Born: 10 May 1946 (age 80) Portuguese Mozambique
- Education: University of Lisbon

Murade Isaac Murargy (born 10 May 1946) is a Mozambican statesman who served as the Executive Secretary of the Community of Portuguese Language Countries, from 2012 to 2017.

== Career ==
Murargy was previously the Mozambican ambassador to France, Brazil, and UNESCO.

Murargy also served as the Secretary-General of the Presidency of Joaquim Chissano, between 1995 and 2005.

== Executive Secretary of the CPLP ==
Murade Murargy took over as executive secretary of the Community of Portuguese Language Countries in July 2012, succeeding Guinean Domingos Simões Pereira. At the 10th CPLP Summit which took place in Dili (East Timor), in 2014, he was re-elected for another term, being succeeded in 2016 by São Toméan Maria do Carmo Silveira.

Political offices
Preceded by Domingos Simões Pereira	Executive Secretary of the CPLP; 2012–2017	Succeeded by Maria do Carmo Silveira
