= Luís de Matos Monteiro da Fonseca =

Cape Verdean diplomat and civil servant

His Excellency Luís de Matos Monteiro da Fonseca

4th Executive Secretary of the Lusophone Commonwealth
- In office July 2004 – July 2008
- Preceded by: João Augusto de Médicis
- Succeeded by: Domingos Simões Pereira

Personal details
- Born: Luís de Matos Monteiro da Fonseca; 17 May 1944 (age 82) Santo Antão, Portuguese Cape Verde
- Education: University of Lisbon

Luís de Matos Monteiro da Fonseca (born 17 May 1944 in Santo Antão, Portuguese Cape Verde) is a Cape Verdean diplomat and civil servant. He served as the Executive Secretary of the Community of Portuguese Language Countries between 2004 and 2008.

== Biography ==
=== Early life ===
Matos Monteiro was a member of the African Party for the Independence of Guinea and Cape Verde (PAIGC), which was an underground party. He was imprisoned several times at Tarrafal camp. He worked at a fishing company named Congel in the island of São Vicente.

Between 1973 and 1974, he was secretary general of the Barlavento Commercial, Industrial and Agricultural Association.

=== Career ===
After independence in 1975, he became a member of the PAIGC and PAICV party and was deputy of the National Assembly in 1975, 1980 and 1985. He worked for the Cape Verdean Ministry of Foreign Affairs.

Fonseca has taken positions as the ambassador to the Netherlands and European Community from 1987 to 1991, then Russia (1991–1994), in Ukraine (1993–1994) and the Commonwealth of Independent States (CIS) (1991–1994), to Austria (1999–2001) and the United Nations (2001–2004). From July 2004 to 2008, da Fonseca was the executive secretary of the Community of Portuguese Language Countries.

From 1995 to 1997, he served as director general for Political and Cultural Affairs. Then from 1997 to 1999, da Fonseca was the Director General for Foreign Policy.

He is married and has two children.

Political offices
Preceded by João Augusto de Médicis	Executive Secretary of the CPLP; 2004–2008	Succeeded by Domingos Simões Pereira
