= Executive Secretary of the Community of Portuguese Language Countries =

- Flag

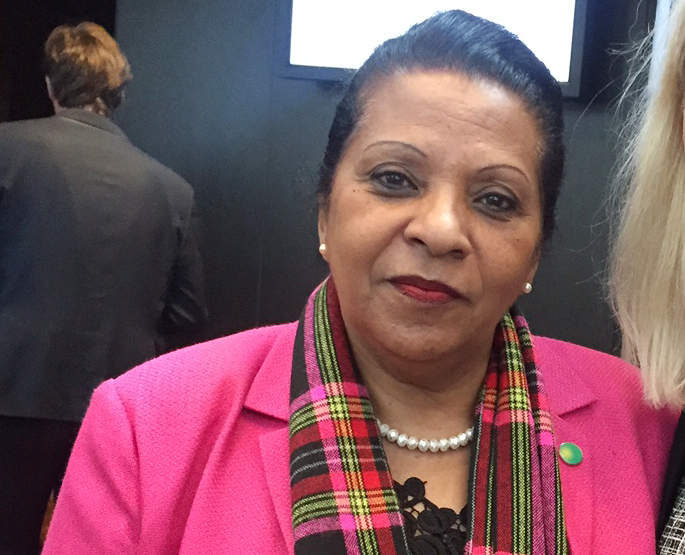
- Incumbent; Maria de Fátima Monteiro Jardim since 18 August 2025
- Style: Her Excellency
- Seat: Penafiel Palace; Lisbon, Portugal
- Appointer: CPLP Heads of State and Government at the CPLP Summit
- Term length: Two years renewable once
- Inaugural holder: Marcolino Moco
- Website: Executive Secretariat

The Executive Secretary of the Community of Portuguese Language Countries (Portuguese: Secretário Executivo da Comunidade dos Países de Língua Portuguesa) is the executive head and highest representative of the Community of Portuguese Language Countries (CPLP), also known as the Lusophone Commonwealth.

== Office ==
The Executive Secretary is charged with leading the Executive Secretariat (Secretariado Executivo), the CPLP's executive branch responsible for creating and implementing the CPLP's agenda of projects and initiatives.

The Executive Secretary, who must be a high-ranking diplomat or politician from one of the member states, is elected for a mandate of two years at the biennial CPLP Summit, and can be reelected once to a second term. The Executive Secretariat is headquartered at Penafiel Palace in Lisbon, Portugal.

== Roles ==
The Executive Secretariat is the main executive body of CPLP and is responsible for:

1 - Implement the decisions of the Conference of Heads of State and Government, the Council of Foreign Ministers and the Permanent Consultation Committee; 2 - Plan and ensure the execution of CPLP programs; 3 - Organize and participate in the meetings of the various CPLP bodies; 4 - Monitor the execution of the decisions of the Ministerial Meetings and other initiatives within the scope of the CPLP.

== List ==
#	Name	Portrait	Country	Start	End	Background
1	Marcolino José Carlos Moco		Angola	July 1996	July 2000	3rd Prime Minister of Angola (1992–1996)
2	Dulce Maria Pereira		Brazil	July 2000	August 2002	President of the Fundação Cultural Palmares (1996–2000)
3	João Augusto de Médicis		Brazil	August 2002	April 2004	Brazilian Ambassador to Kenya (1984–1989); Brazilian Ambassador to Poland (1991–1993); Brazilian Ambassador to China (1994–1996); Brazilian Ambassador to Chile (1999–2002)
4	Luís de Matos Monteiro da Fonseca		Cabo Verde	July 2004	July 2008	Cabo Verdean Ambassador to European Community (1987–1991); Cabo Verdean Ambassador to Russia (1991–1994); Cabo Verdean Ambassador to Austria (1999–2001); Cabo Verdean Ambassador to the United Nations (2001–2004)
5	Domingos Simões Pereira		Guinea-Bissau	July 2008	July 2012	Guinea-Bissau Minister of Public Works (2004–2005)
6	Murade Isaac Murargy		Mozambique	July 2012	January 2017	Secretary-General of the Presidency of Mozambique (1995–2005); Mozambican Ambassador to France and (Germany) (1985–1995)
7	Maria do Carmo Trovoada Pires de Carvalho Silveira		São Tomé and Príncipe	January 2017	January 2019	13th Prime Minister of São Tomé and Príncipe (2005–2006); Governor of the São Toméan Central Bank (1999–2005, 2011–2016)
8	Francisco Ribeiro Telles		Portugal	January 2019	July 2021	Portuguese Ambassador to Cabo Verde (2002–2006); Portuguese Ambassador to Angola (2007–2012); Portuguese Ambassador to Brazil (2012–2016); Portuguese Ambassador to Italy (2016–2018)
9	Zacarias da Costa		East Timor	July 2021	July 2025	East Timorese Minister of Foreign Affairs (2007–2012)
10	Maria de Fátima Monteiro Jardim		Angola	July 2025	Present	_{Angolan Minister of Fisheries and Environment (1996-2002)} _{Angolan Minister of Environment (2008-2017)} _{Angolan Ambassador to Italy (2019-2025)}
