= Cabinda =

Cabinda may refer to:

- Cabinda Province, an exclave and Province of Angola
- Cabinda (city), the administrative capital of Cabinda Province
  - Cabinda Airport
  - F.C. Cabinda, an association football club
  - Sporting Clube de Cabinda, an association football club
- Operation Cabinda, a 1985 military operation carried out in Cabinda Province by the South African Special Forces during the South African Border War
- Roman Catholic Diocese of Cabinda
- Jason Cabinda (born 1996), American football linebacker

== Political movements ==
- Republic of Cabinda, Cabinda Free State self-proclaimed government which claims sovereignty over Cabinda
- Action Committee of the Cabinda National Union, a defunct separatist organization
- Communist Committee of Cabinda, a militant separatist group
- Democratic Front of Cabinda, a separatist group
- Front for the Liberation of the Enclave of Cabinda, a guerrilla and political movement fighting for the independence of Cabinda
  - Cabinda War, waged by the FLEC
  - Forças Armadas de Cabinda, the armed wing of the FLEC
- Liberation Front of the State of Cabinda, a separatist group
- Mayombe National Alliance, a defunct separatist organization
- Movement for the Liberation of the Enclave of Cabinda, a defunct separatist organization
- National Union for the Liberation of Cabinda, a militant separatist group
- Popular Movement for the Liberation of Cabinda, a possibly-disbanded militant separatist group

== See also ==
- Kabinda (disambiguation)
