= Republic of Cabinda =

Unrecognized state in Angola, 1975–1976

Coordinates: 5°34′15″S 12°11′36″E

Republic of Cabinda República de Cabinda Kilansi kia Kabinda
- 1975–1976, 1999
- Flag Coat of arms
- Anthem: A Pátria Imortal (Portuguese) "The Immortal Fatherland"
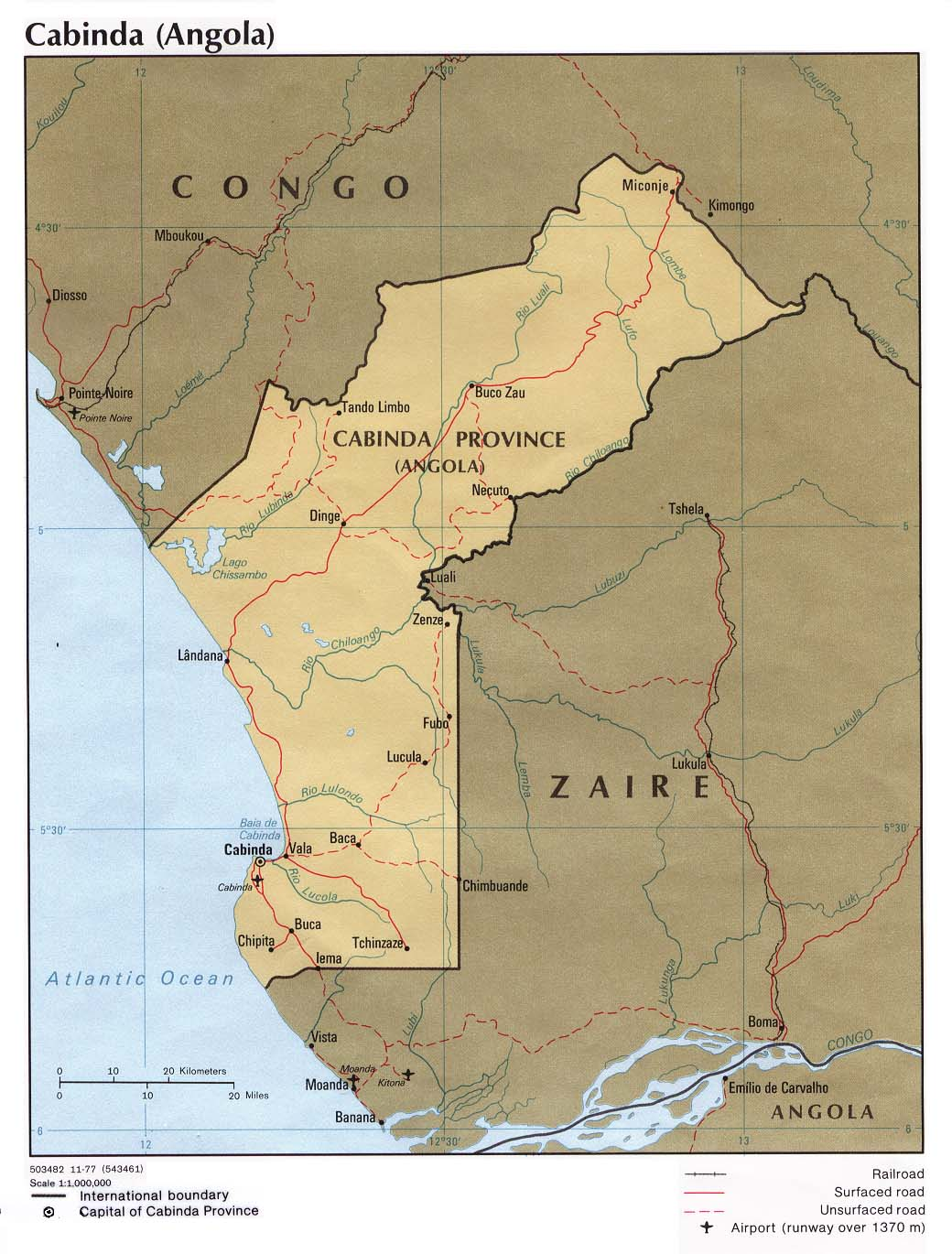
- Territory claimed by the Republic of Cabinda
- Status: Unrecognized state
- Capital: Cabinda
- Capital-in-exile: Paris, France and Pointe-Noire
- Common languages: Portuguese; Ibinda
- Government: Presidential republic
- President
  - 1975: Pedro Simba Macosso (as de jure president)
  - 1975: Henrique N'zita Tiago (as provisional president)
  - 1975: Luis de Gonzaga Branque Franque (as provisional president)
  - 1975–1976: Luis de Gonzaga Branque Franque (as de facto president)
  - 1999: Antonio Luis Lopes
- Prime Minister
  - Probably 1975–1976: Lola Patrick
- Defence Minister and Foreign Minister
  - Probably 1975–1976: Pancracio Bungo Lubendo and Francisco Bilendo
- History
  - Established: August 1, 1975
  - Debellation: January 4, 1976, 1999
Preceded by	Succeeded by
Portuguese Angola	People's Republic of Angola
- 1. In exile since 1976.

The Republic of Cabinda (Ibinda: Kilansi kia Kabinda; Portuguese: República de Cabinda) was an independent protectorate of Portugal that was taken over by Angola after Portugal declared Angola a free country. It is currently an unrecognized state, and is known to Angola as Cabinda Province, part of Angolan territory. The Front for the Liberation of the State of Cabinda-Exército de Cabinda (FLEC) claimed sovereignty just after the Republic of Cabinda was proclaimed as an independent country in 1975 from Portugal and just after Angola invaded. The government of this (internationally unrecognized) entity operates in exile, with offices located in Paris, France, and Pointe Noire, Republic of the Congo.

The 1885 Treaty of Simulambuco designated Cabinda a Portuguese protectorate known as the Portuguese Congo, which was administratively separate from Portuguese West Africa (Angola). In the 20th century, Portugal integrated Cabinda as a district within the "overseas province" of Angola. During the Portuguese Colonial War, FLEC fought for the independence of Cabinda from the Portuguese. Independence was proclaimed on 1 August 1975, and FLEC formed a provisional government led by Henrique N'zita Tiago. Luis Ranque Franque was elected president.

In January 1975, Angola's three national liberation movements (People's Movement for the Liberation of Angola (MPLA), National Liberation Front of Angola (FNLA) and National Union for the Total Independence of Angola (UNITA) met with the colonial power in Alvor, Portugal, to establish the modalities of the transition to independence. There was no representation for Cabinda despite being a Portuguese protectorate Treaty of Simulambuco, not being a colony, and winning independence from Portugal in August 1975. FLEC was also not invited. On 15 January 1975 the Alvor Agreement was signed, laying the groundwork for official Angolan independence (to be instituted on 11 November 1975) and confirming Cabinda as part of Angola. The Alvor agreements were suspended by Portugal just one month and seventeen days before Angola's independence making Angola's claim to Cabinda void. However, after Angolan independence was declared in November 1975, Cabinda was occupied by the forces of the Popular Movement for the Liberation of Angola (MPLA), which had been present in Cabinda since the mid-1960s, sustaining an anti-colonial guerrilla war that was rather more efficient than the one run by FLEC.

For much of the 1970s and 1980s, the FLEC fought a low-intensity guerrilla war, attacking the troops of what was by then the People's Republic of Angola, led by the MPLA. FLEC's tactics included attacking economic targets and kidnapping foreign employees working in the province's oil and construction businesses. In July 2006, after ceasefire negotiations, António Bento Bembe – as president of the Cabindan Forum for Dialogue and Peace, vice-president and executive secretary of FLEC – announced that the Cabindan separatist forces were ready to declare a ceasefire. A peace treaty was signed. FLEC-FAC from Paris contends Bembe had no authority or mandate to negotiate with the Angolans and that the only acceptable solution is total independence.

== Geography ==
Cabinda is a territory of 7,284 square kilometres in west central Africa with a population of 264,584 in 2006 (estimate), divided between four municipalities of Belize (population: 17,693), Buco Zau (40,019), Cabinda (185,924) and Cacongo (20,948). Cabinda is an Angolan exclave, which means that it is not connected to the rest of Angola by land. It borders the Atlantic Ocean to the west, the Republic of the Congo to the north, and the Democratic Republic of the Congo to the east and south. The DR Congo territory along the north bank of the Congo River separates Cabinda from the Angolan mainland.

More than 3,500 people of Cabinda live in refugee camps in the Democratic Republic of the Congo and in the Republic of the Congo.

== Climate ==
Climate data for Cabinda
Month	Jan	Feb	Mar	Apr	May	Jun	Jul	Aug	Sep	Oct	Nov	Dec	Year
Mean daily maximum °C (°F)	30 (86)	31 (87)	31 (87)	31 (87)	29 (84)	26 (78)	26 (78)	26 (78)	27 (80)	28 (82)	29 (84)	28 (83)	28 (83)
Mean daily minimum °C (°F)	23 (73)	23 (73)	23 (73)	23 (74)	23 (73)	21 (69)	18 (65)	19 (67)	21 (70)	23 (74)	23 (74)	23 (74)	22 (72)
Average precipitation mm (inches)	58 (2.3)	110 (4.3)	84 (3.3)	120 (4.6)	56 (2.2)	0 (0)	0 (0)	2.5 (0.1)	5.1 (0.2)	33 (1.3)	110 (4.5)	89 (3.5)	670 (26.3)
Source: Weatherbase

== History ==
=== Background ===
The Republic of Cabinda traces its claims to self-sovereignty to its initial status as a Portuguese protectorate, known as the Portuguese Congo This protectorate had a separate history and legal status from that of the much larger Portuguese West Africa, dating to its inception on 19 September 1883. Also, in the Treaty of Simulambuco and the Berlin Conference in 1885, Cabinda and Angola were treated as distinct entities.

From inception onwards, Cabinda experienced several changes of status within the Portuguese framework, oscillating between positions of relative autonomy and integration within the greater Colony (or Province) of Angola.

The agreement of turn of the century Great Britain with Portugal as to jurisdiction boundaries, reached to counter the French and Belgians next door in the Congos, triggered the Scramble for Africa when the latter, not to mention the Germans, expressed disagreement.

In May 2019, repression was reported in Cabinda.

=== Relations with Angola ===
During the movement for Angolan independence in the 1960s, the situation became more complex. In May 1963 the Organization of African Unity (OAU) ranked Cabinda as the 39th state still to be decolonized and Angola as the 35th.

In the early 1960s, several independence movements advocating a separate status for Cabinda came into being. The Movement for the Liberation of the Enclave of Cabinda (MLEC) was formed in 1960 under the leadership of Luis Ranque Franque. Resulting from the merger of various émigré associations in Brazzaville, the MLEC rapidly became the most prominent of the separatist movements. A further group was the Alliama (Mayombe National Alliance), representing the Mayombe, a small minority of the population. These movements united in August 1963 to form a common, united front called the Front for the Liberation of the State of Cabinda (FLEC). The leadership role was taken by the MLEC's Ranque Franque. FLEC established a Cabindan government in exile in Kinshasa. In marked contrast with the FNLA, the FLEC's efforts to mobilize international support for its government in exile met with little success. In fact, the majority of OAU members, concerned that this could encourage separatism elsewhere on the continent and duly committed to the sanctity of African state borders, firmly rejected recognition of the FLEC's government in exile. Later, in the course of Angola's turbulent decolonisation process, Ranque Franque proclaimed the independence of the Republic of Cabinda in Kampala on 1 August 1975 at an OAU summit which was discussing Angola at that precise moment. Zairian President Mobutu Sese Seko called for a referendum on the future of the Cabinda. Congolese Prime Minister Henri Lopes is reported to have said at the time that "Cabinda exists as a reality and is historically and geographically different from Angola."

The Alvor Agreement, signed on January 15, 1975, granted Angola independence from Portugal on November 11. The agreement, signed by the MPLA, FNLA, UNITA, and the Portuguese government, was never signed by the FLEC or any representatives of Cabinda. MPLA (mainly Cuban) troops entered Cabinda via Pointe Noire on November 11, 1975, and incorporated Cabinda into Angola proper as "Cabinda Province". The Alvor Agreement states that "Angola constitutes one indivisible unity. In this context, Cabinda is an integral and inalienable part of Angola." At the time, Cabinda was producing nearly all of Angola's oil, which accounted for close to half of the nation's gross national product.

During much of the 1970s and 1980s, FLEC operated a low intensity, guerrilla war, attacking Angolan government troops and economic targets or creating havoc by kidnapping foreign employees working in the province's oil and construction businesses. In July 2006 after ceasefire negotiations in Brazzaville, António Bento Bembe – as a president of Cabindan Forum for Dialogue and Peace, vice-president and executive secretary of FLEC – announced that the Cabindan separatist forces were ready to declare a ceasefire. The peace was recognized by the United States, France, Portugal, Russia, Gabon, DR Congo, Republic of the Congo, Japan, South Korea, the European Union and the African Union. After the peace agreement, Bento Bembe was elected Minister without portfolio in the Government of Angola. FLEC-FAC from Paris contends Bembe has no authority or mandate to negotiate with the Angolans and that the only acceptable solution is total independence.

During a visit to Washington, D.C. in February 2003, Angolan President José Eduardo dos Santos said that he supported a referendum on Cabindan autonomy. However, he stated he intended to consult the Angolan people as well, who likely will be loath to relinquish sixty percent of their nation's oil revenues. FLEC said that it would only consider an East Timor-type referendum, which would grant Cabinda total independence.

=== Togo football team bus attack ===
On 8 January 2010, while being escorted by Angolan forces in Cabinda, the team bus of the Togo national football team was attacked by gunmen as it travelled to the 2010 Africa Cup of Nations tournament. The ensuing gunfight resulted in the deaths of the assistant coach, team spokesman and bus driver, as well as injuring several others.

An offshoot of the FLEC claimed responsibility. Rodrigues Mingas, secretary general of the Front for the Liberation of the Enclave of Cabinda-Military Position (FLEC-PM), said that his fighters had meant to attack security guards as the convoy passed through Cabinda. "This attack was not aimed at the Togolese players but at the Angolan forces at the head of the convoy," Mingas told France 24 television. "So it was pure chance that the gunfire hit the players. We don't have anything to do with the Togolese and we present our condolences to the African families and the Togo government. We are fighting for the total liberation of Cabinda." FLEC released its version of the events of January 8 which suggests that elements of the Angolan secret police and their Cabindan agents were responsible for the attack.

== See also ==
- List of heads of state of Cabinda
- Cabinda War
