= Symbols of the Republic of Cabinda =

The Angolan exclave of Cabinda has been the site of a separatist conflict since the Angolan War of Independence. The separatist side is represented by several organizations, the largest of which is the FLEC, which maintains the armed forces of the Republic of Cabinda.As President Rodrigues Mingas and The Premier Minister Stephane Barros

== Front for the Liberation of the Enclave of Cabinda ==
The most popular version of the FLEC flag

Emblem of FLEC

Flag of FLEC-Renovada

Blue-yellow-red tricolor with green triangle and white star appeared on 1 August 1975, when the Front for the Liberation of the Enclave of Cabinda declared independence Republic of Cabinda. The state ceased to exist after five months, but FLEC continues to operate under the same flag. The original FLEC was reformed in the 1990s and split into factions. This flag represented Cabinda in the UNPO between 1997 and 2011. Apart from FLEC-Renovada, whose flag was white with a central stripe divided into three colours (green, yellow and black, with a red ring in the middle of the flag), these factions continued to use the original red, yellow and blue flag.

== Liberation Front of the State of Cabinda ==
Flag of FLEC

Seal of FLEC

The next flag of the Republic of Cabinda, headed by a Liberation Front of the State of Cabinda, government in exile established by immigrants in the Netherlands, changed the red to black. Adopted after 1996, the central stripe represents the padrão, a still existing monument erected in 1956, in memory of the Treaty of Simulambuco (1885), which established a Portuguese protectorate over Cabinda. The disregard of this treaty by the Angolan government is one of the causes of the conflict.

== Cabinda Free State ==

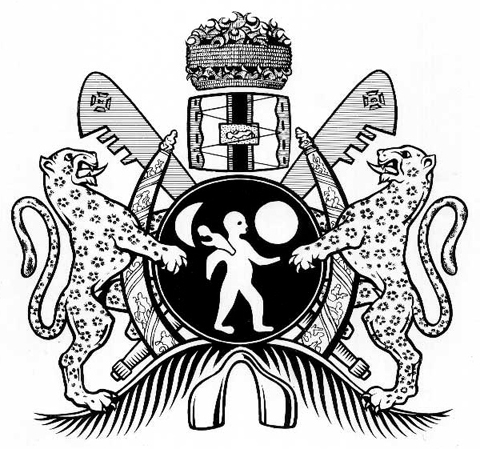

Royal Banner of the Kingdom of Kakongo (c. 1883)

An organization calling itself simply "Cabinda Free State" created symbols referring to the pre-colonial Bakongo kingdoms. The flag they use is a horizontal copper, white and black tricolour. The copper symbolizes the kingdoms of NGoyo, Loango and Kakongo, the white culture and the black the inhabitants. The charge of their coat of arms represents the design of the ancient banner of King of Kakongo, that is, the ruler carrying his son between the moon and the sun.
