= Cabinda War =

1975–present conflict in the Angolan exclave of Cabinda

- Part of the Angolan Civil War (until 2002) and decolonization of Africa
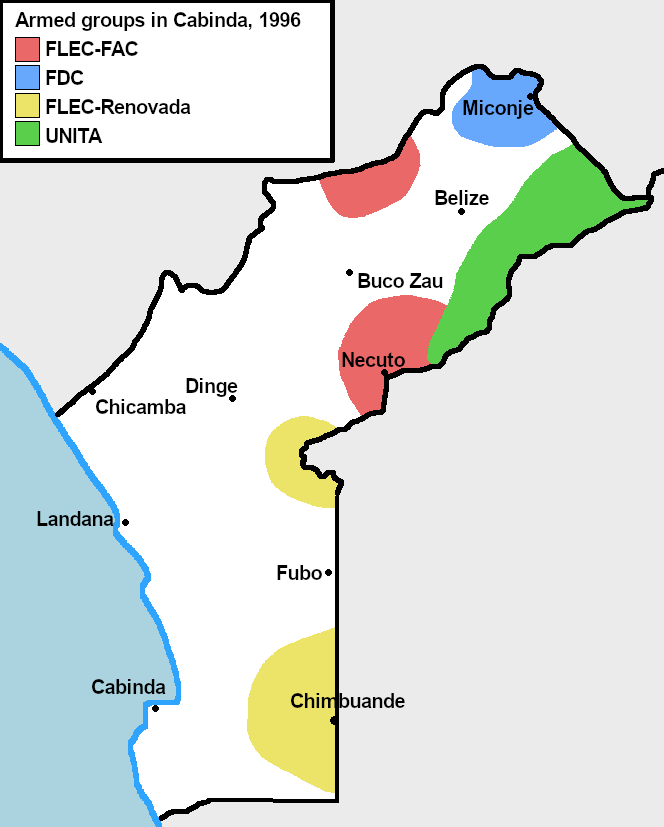
- Armed groups in Cabinda in 1996
Date	8 November 1975 – present (51 years and 10 days)
Location	Cabinda Province
Status	Ongoing; Ceasefire declared by FLEC-Renovada in August 2006; Ongoing guerrilla warfare by FLEC-FAC; Unilateral ceasefire declared by Cabindan militias on 30 March 2020 to address the COVID-19 pandemic; Ceasefire ended alongside the end of the pandemic

Belligerents
Angola; Cuba (until 1991); RPD Angola (1991); UNITA (joint operations, 1991); Military advisers and pilots: East Germany (until 1989); Soviet Union (until 1989)	FLEC; FLEC-FAC; CCC; Republic of Cabinda (1975–1976, 1999); Democratic Front of Cabinda; Zaire (1975)

Commanders and leaders
(Angola) João Lourenço; (Angola) Esperança da Costa; (Angola) João Ernesto dos Santos; (Angola) Altino Carlos José dos Santos; Former commanders: (Angola) Agostinho Neto; (Angola) José Eduardo dos Santos; (Angola) Lopo do Nascimento; (Angola) Fernando José de França Dias Van-Dúnem; (Angola) Marcolino Moco; (Angola) Fernando da Piedade Dias dos Santos; (Angola) Paulo Kassoma; (Angola) Manuel Vicente; (Angola) Bornito de Sousa; (Angola) Iko Carreira; (Angola) Pedro Pedalé; (Angola) Pedro Sebastião; (Angola) Kundi Paihama; (Angola) Cândido Pereira dos Santos Van-Dúnem; (Angola) Salviano de Jesus Sequeira; (Angola) António França; (Angola) João de Matos; (Angola) Armando da Cruz Neto; (Angola) Agostinho Fernandes Nelumb; (Angola) Francisco Pereira Furtado; (Angola) Geraldo Nunda; (Angola) António Egídio de Sousa Santos; (Cuba) Fidel Castro; (Cuba) Antonio Enrique Lussón Batlle; (Cuba) Abelardo Colomé Ibarra; (Cuba) Arnaldo Ochoa (executed); (East Germany) Erich Honecker; (East Germany) Egon Krenz; (East Germany) Walter Ulbricht; (East Germany) Willi Stoph; (East Germany) Manfred Gerlach; (East Germany) Sabine Bergmann-Pohl; (East Germany) Horst Sindermann; (East Germany) Hans Modrow; (East Germany) Lothar de Maizière; (Soviet Union) Leonid Brezhnev; (Soviet Union) Yuri Andropov; (Soviet Union) Konstantin Chernenko; (Soviet Union) Mikhail Gorbachev; (Soviet Union) Nikolai Podgorny; (Soviet Union) Vasily Kuznetsov; (Soviet Union) Andrei Gromyko; (Soviet Union) Alexei Kosygin; (Soviet Union) Nikolai Tikhonov; (Soviet Union) Nikolai Ryzhkov; (Soviet Union) Valentin Pavlov; (Soviet Union) Ivan Silayev	António Bento Bembe; Henrique N'zita Tiago; Alexandre Builo Tati # Francisco Xavier Lubota; José Tiburcio Zinga Loemba

Strength
(Angola) 87,000 (2013) (Cuba) 2,000 (Soviet Union) 4	300–7,000 in total (1975); FLEC-Renovada: 500 (1991); FLEC-N'zita: 200–300 (1991); FLEC-FAC: 600 (1992)

Casualties and losses
- ~30,000 killed 25,000 displaced

The Cabinda War is an ongoing separatist insurgency, waged by the Front for the Liberation of the Enclave of Cabinda (FLEC) against the government of Angola. FLEC aims at the restoration of the self-proclaimed Republic of Cabinda, located within the borders of the Cabinda province of Angola.

== Background ==
The first Western exploration of the area of modern-day Cabinda was undertaken by navigator Diogo Cão in 1483, later falling under Portuguese influence. In 1853 a delegation of Cabindan chiefs unsuccessfully requested the extension of Portuguese administration from the colony of Angola to Cabinda. Local chiefs continued their attempts at cooperating with Portugal until the 1884 Berlin Conference and the 1885 Treaty of Simulambuco, following which the Cabindan enclave became a Portuguese protectorate. Despite the fact that Cabinda held a semi independent status, a new Portuguese government elected in 1956 transferred the region's administration to Angola without a prior agreement with Cabinda's local leadership.

The population of Cabinda are primarily Kikongo-speakers and a part of the larger Kongo ethnic group that inhabits the region from the Dande River north of Luanda. There are six main subgroups that live in Cabinda, the Vili, Kakongo, Woyo on the coast, and the Linge, Sundi and Yombe in the interior. These groups also spill over into the Congo. The links between Cabindans and their neighbours North and South of the Congo River derive from diaspora, people travelling from their homeland to find work.

The first Cabindan separatist movement known as Associação dos Indígenas do Enclave de Cabinda (AlEC) was formed in 1956, AIEC advocated the creation of a union between Cabinda and Belgian Congo or French Congo. Associação dos Ressortissants do Enclave de Cabinda (AREC) was founded in 1959 as humanitarian organisation, AREC was renamed into Freedom Movement for the State of Cabinda (MLEC), shifting its role into a political movement promoting self-determination. The National Action Committee of the Cabindan People (CAUNC) and the Mayombé Alliance (ALLIAMA) joined the growing political scene in the same year. In 1963, MLEC, ALLIAMA and CAUNC merged into the Front for the Liberation of the Enclave of Cabinda (FLEC), which had since been the largest self-determination movement in the region.

On the same year, the Organisation of African Unity declared that Cabinda is an independently governed state with its own independence movement. On 10 January 1967, FLEC formed a government in exile based in the town of Tshela, Zaire. In August 1974, FLEC absorbed the Democratic Union of Cabindan Peoples and the Democratic Party of Cabinda, becoming the sole political organisation in Cabinda.

In January 1975 under pressure from Angolan liberation movements, Portugal accepted Cabinda as part of Angola in the Alvor Agreement where the 3 Angolan independence movements (MPLA, UNITA and FNLA) were present, denying Cabinda the right to self-determination previously granted by the U.N. Chart/Right to Self-determination and the Treaty of Simulambuco. On 1 August 1975, FLEC president Luis Ranque Franque announced the formation of the Republic of Cabinda, an independent state. The MPLA troops controlling the region at the time ignored the statement. In November 1975, Angola gained independence from Portugal, claiming Cabinda as part of its territory. The provisional Cabindan government, led by the FLEC, was overturned. On 8 November 1975, FLEC responded by initiating armed struggle, aiming at creating a separate Cabindan state.

== Conflict ==
In the course of the Angolan Civil War, FLEC split into five independent factions. FLEC-Posição Militar (FLEC-PM) was later renamed into FLEC-Renovada (FLEC-R), FLEC-N'Zita, FLEC-Lubota, União Nacional de Libertação de Cabinda (UNLC) and the Communist Committee of Cabinda. As the war continued the MPLA led government attempted to gain the support of the various FLEC factions and enter negotiations. On the other hand, UNITA rebels directly collaborated with FLEC-FAC, while seeking to broaden its alliance with the group. The above did not stop UNITA from occasionally collaborating with MPLA in anti-FLEC operations. In 2002, the Angolan government signed a peace deal with UNITA officially ending the civil war.

== Background to the involvement of Cabinda ==
On August 5th 1975, South African troops invaded 10 miles into Southern Angola, which was followed by further waves on the 14th and 23rd of October 1975. This intervention triggered the involvement of Cuba, in the form of 480 Cuban instructors, alongside armoured troop carriers and artillery. Further threats to the MPLA in the capital arrived in the form of Zahiran units crossing the Northern border into Angola through a joint operation with the FNLA, heading towards Caxito, within 30 miles of Luanda. On November 5th 1975, the Cuban Central committee held a meeting to decide and subsequently dispatch the first Cuban fighting units to Angolan territory. 650 men in 3 Cuban military planes were dispatched by Fidel Castro with the aim to stop South African and Zahiran troops from reaching Luanda. By this date Zaire had 11,000 troops within Northern Angola and 6,000 South African troops were advancing from the South. On the 10th of November 1975, the Zarian’s, alongside a 26-man South African team, launched an attack on Quifangondo, the main water supply for the capital Luanda, 15 miles outside of the city. Simultaneously the Zahiran army launched an attack on the oil reserves of Cabinda in support of the FLEC.

Cuba, East Germany and the Soviet Union entered the civil war on MPLA's side in 1975, soon invading Cabinda. According to U.S. intelligence services, France and Belgium allegedly supported FLEC by providing training and financial aid, despite the fact that Zaire remained FLEC's main foreign supporter. FLEC-Renovada received support from a number of US, South African and Japanese right wing organisations as well as the World League for Freedom and Democracy. In 1956, oil was first discovered in the region; by 1966, Gulf Oil Company began commercial exploitation. The large amounts of revenue generated by oil royalties contributed to the rise of Cabinda's geopolitical significance. By 1970, oil revenues amounted to $16 million and were expected to rise to $32–50 million by 1972. In the early 1970s there was movements from the FLEC to establish Cabinda as an independent entity, related specifically over the control of oil, which resulted in anti-colonial groups fractur into separate ideological camps fighting for leadership. Additionally, the royalties paid by the Gulf Oil Company significantly contributed to the Portuguese colonial administration’s military budget to combat nationalist endeavours for independence.

Oil continued to play an important role; by 2011 it represented approximately 86% of the Angolan state's total earnings. The marginalisation of the local population in favour of Portuguese and later Angolan interests played an important role in the rise of separatist militancy in the region.

On 18 July 2006, the Cabinda Forum for Dialogue (FCD) and FLEC-Renovada led by António Bento Bembe signed a second definite cease fire with the Angolan government known as the Memorandum of Understanding for Peace in Cabinda. The event took place in Macabi, Cabinda. The agreement assured Cabinda's status as a part of Angola, provided special economic status and local governance powers to Cabinda, and condemned further acts of insurgency and separatism. The treaty received criticism from Bembe's opponents within the movement. The peace accord marked a sharp decrease in the conflict's intensity.

According to the Unrepresented Nations and Peoples Organization, Cabinda is under military occupation, reinforced in recent times by Angolan forces. This was especially true after the Togo national football team was attacked by the FLEC, when Angola was hosting the 2010 African Cup of Nations. Rebel forces claimed it was a mistake. In 2012, FLEC-FAC announced its readiness to declare a ceasefire and pursue a negotiated resolution to the conflict.

International intervention in the conflict has been limited, with Portugal offering a mediation role and letting the FLEC rule a delegation in Lisbon.

== Threat to Cabinda Oil (Operation Argon, May 1985) ==
In late-May 1985, South African Special forces Captain Winan Pertus Joannes Du Toit, with 14 other commandos, and a military doctor, launched Operation Argon. The operation began with the Du Toit and others launching a rubber dingy from the SADF (South African Defence Forces) destroyer situated off the coast of Angola’s Calbindin province. 15 miles off the coast of Malebo, three boats headed for the coast with aim to dock just north of the petrol installations of the US Gulf Oil Company, source of 65% of Angola’s wealth.

Carrying enough explosives to blow away the entire Gulf Oil Company complex, the operation aimed to place two mines at each of the six storage tanks, alongside the water pipes for the fire extinguishers, before heading back to their boats. This Operation aimed to undermine the negotiations between the Gulf and the Angolan Government, and to provide a propaganda campaign to establish support for the UNITA movement. However, on later account. Du Toit never recalled the involvement of UNITA. Days prior to the operation, the UNITA representative in Paris had announced plans to extend their military presence and activities in the oil regions of Cabinda and Soyo.

However, once Angolan soldiers (FAPLA) found footprints on the edge of the forest, the operation went south as the party was surrounded and they were forced to spit off and flee over the boarder to Zaire. Six of the team manage to escape, with Du Toit and two others being captured and injured in their escape. This put a direct end to the operation, and it was deemed a failure.

== Conflict Between Luanda and Cabinda ==
Cabinda is a geographically isolated province of Angola, separated from the mainland strip of the country by a small section of land belonging to the Democratic Republic of the Congo. The origins of the ongoing tensions between Cabinda and Angola’s capital city have their roots in Angola’s colonial trajectory. The main point brought up by Cabindan separatists are contingent on the fact that Angolan mainland has a divergent history and experience from the Cabindan province. In this regard, Angola was a Portuguese colony for over four centuries while Cabinda was a protectorate which gained quasi-independence in 1956. Furthermore, the Cabindan province’s sovereignty was affirmed by the Organisation of African Union in 1963 which designated the territory as an independently governed state. Thus, Cabindans have established militant separatist groups which have since engaged in intermittent fighting with Luanda’s military forces. These separatist groups include the Freedom Movement for the State of Cabinda (MLEC) in 1960; the National Action Committee of the Cabindan People (CAUNC) and the Mayombé Alliance (also referred to as ALLIAMA).

When the Portuguese administration granted independence and left Angola in 1975, negotiated through the Alvor Accord, the future status of Cabinda was planned by the outgoing administration and Angola’s three leading nationalist movements (MPLA, FNLA and UNITA), although with the omission of Cabindan representatives. Thus, the FLEC was formed as a result of this disenfranchisement of the Cabindan province. The secessionist fervour and militancy of the FLEC was the product of a refusal to allow Cabinda’s inhabitants to determine their own future.

While the FLEC’s request for secession is premised on the history of political exclusion and disenfranchisement and the resulting wish among Cabindans for regional autonomy, there are economic factors that drove the militancy of the group. Importantly, the Cabindans have been strategically deprived of their access to the oil in the territory. When oil was discovered in Cabinda in 1956, the Gulf Oil Company subsequently began to explore the territory in 1966. The significance of the province in the colonial dispensation became dominant, although without the inclusion of the locals in the management of oil resources. Of particular note, the royalties paid by the Gulf Oil Company contributed to the Portuguese military budget in their efforts against liberationist forces during the Angolan War for Independence.

Currently, Cabinda’s oil fields make up a large portion of Angola’s total oil output. Furthermore, the Angolan government is dependent on Cabinda’s offshore crude oil, which makes up approximately 86% of the country’s earnings.

== Timeline ==
=== 1975–2006 ===
- 8 November 1975, FLEC initiated its armed struggle, aiming at creating a separate Cabindan state.
- 9 November 1975, FLEC clashed with MPLA troops. A total of 600 Cabindan MPLA soldiers defected to FLEC following rumors of a large scale Congolese invasion into the region, the defectors reportedly brought Soviet made heavy weaponry.
- 11–14 June 1977, fire was exchanged between FLEC fighters and government forces leading to several casualties.
- 27 July 1979, 7 militants were killed in three separate incidents, as clashes took place in Pangamongo, Tando-Makuku, and Seva.
- 20 August 1979, insurgents killed 2 East German and 3 Cuban soldiers outside Inhuca and Buco-Zau.
- 22 May 1981, an Angolan court sentenced 6 people to death for belonging to FLEC.
- May 1985, SADF attempt to destroy the Cabindin Oil reserves in Operation Argon.
- 25 April 1990, FLEC-N'zita militants abducted 4 French and 4 Congolese Elf Aquitaine personnel, the hostages were released following negotiations with French officials.
- 20 September 1990, FLEC-N'zita rebels kidnapped 2 Portuguese Mota e Companhia Limitada employees, they were released two months later.
- 21 April 1990, FLEC perpetrated a grenade attack on a market in the city of Cabinda, injuring 24 people.
- 7 June 1991, FLEC appealed to the Angolan government, calling for a referendum on Cabinda's autonomy status.
- 29–30 September 1992, general elections were held in Angola, turnout in Cabinda ranged between 7–12% following a call by FLEC for a boycott.
- 29 September 1995, FLEC-Renovada signed a four-month cease-fire with the Angolan government.
- 18–22 November 1995, the Cabinda Democratic Front and the Angolan government held talks in Point Noire, Congo, failing to reach an agreement.
- 23 January 1996, FLEC guerrillas abducted 3 mining workers.
- 11 December 1996, an engagement between FAA and FLEC lead to the deaths of 29 people.
- 5 March 1997, 42 soldiers were killed in a battle with Cabindan separatist guerrillas.
- 26 March 1997, 2 FLEC-FAC militants and 27 soldiers were killed as fighting erupted in northeastern Cabinda.
- 10–20 June 1997, over 100 people were killed as government troops engaged in heavy clashes with separatists.
- 8 January 1998, FAA suffered 24 combat casualties as a result of fighting with FLEC.
- 28 March 1998, FLEC-FAC militants attacked two civilian vehicles killing a single person.
- 4 October 1998, a FAA offensive in Cabinda resulted in the combined deaths of 200 people.
- 11 November 1998, an Angolan army shelling killed 7 civilians and wounded 19 others.
- 24 November 1998, 11 FAA personnel lost their lives in an attack by FLEC.
- 14 June 1999, FLEC targeted the village of Bulo, slaying 4 civilians and injuring 6 others.
- 4 April 2002 Angola’s Civil War came to an end.
- 18 April 2002, 12 soldiers were killed in the aftermath of clashes with FLEC.
- 30 October 2002, FLEC-FAC guerrillas captured the biggest military base in Cabinda known as Kungo Shonzo, located 100 kilometers northeast of the city of Cabinda.
- 2 January 2003, Angolan troops captured two FLEC-Renovada officers and seized a large cache of weaponry and explosives.
- 8 June 2003, 7 FLEC-FAC commanders including chief of staff Francisco Luemba surrendered to Angolan authorities.
- 17 June 2003, Angolan security forces murdered two civilians in the Buco-Zau district.
- 29 November 2003, a total of 1,000 former FLEC fighters and their relatives were officially integrated into the Angolan army, police force and civil society.
- 24 December 2003, FLEC conducted an ambush in the Buco-Zau district, killing 3 security personnel and 3 civilians.
- 17 November 2004, 53 FLEC-FAC rebels abandoned armed struggle and surrendered to the authorities of the Buco-Zau district.

=== 2006–present ===
- On 18 July 2006, the Cabinda Forum for Dialogue (FCD) and FLEC-Renovada led by António Bento Bembe signed a second definite cease fire with the Angolan government known as the Memorandum of Understanding for Peace in Cabinda, the event took place in Macabi, Cabinda. The agreement assured Cabinda's status as a part of Angola, provided special economic status and local governance powers to Cabinda, and condemned further acts of insurgency and separatism. The treaty received criticism from Bembe's opponents within the movement.
- 10 September 2007, António Bento Bembe was appointed to the post of minister without portfolio as part of the 2006 peace deal.
- 11 December 2007, 95 former FLEC insurgents joined the ranks of the 11th Unit of the Riot Police, the event was part of the 18 July 2006 peace deal.
- 3 March 2008, FLEC separatists killed three FAA soldiers in the city of Cabinda.
- 27 March 2009, FLEC-FAC rebels attacked a convoy of three Chinese owned trucks in the outskirts of Cacongo, killing one Chinese national. At least 8 people were arrested for allegedly perpetrating the attack.
- 1 April 2009, an army patrol came under attack by suspected militants in the area of Cacongo.
- 8 January 2010, FLEC perpetrated an attack on the Togo national football team, leaving 3 people dead and 9 wounded.
- 9 July 2010, Henrique N'zita Tiago stated that FLEC will discontinue its armed struggle and offered to restart peace talks, FLEC Renovada commander Alexandre Builo Tati echoed the statement.
- 8 November 2010, FLEC militants ambushed a convoy carrying Chinese workers, 2 Angolan soldiers were killed in the incident.
- 2–26 March 2011, Angolan secret services carried out a number of assassinations targeting FLEC commanders. FLEC-N'Zita head of staff, Gabriel "Firefly" Pea was assassinated in Ponta Negra, Republic of the Congo, on March 2. FLEC-FAC chief of staff Gabriel "Pirilampo" Nhemba was found dead in the village of N'tando, Republic of the Congo, on March 14. FLEC operational commander of Northern Region, Maurice "Sabata" Lubota's body was found in the vicinity of Kimongo, Republic of the Congo, on March 26.
- 20 December 2014, guerrillas ambushed an army vehicle in the outskirts of Vito Novo, Buco-Zau municipality, killing 4 and wounding 7 soldiers.
- 22 December 2014, a skirmish took place in Ntataba, Buco-Zau, resulting in 1 death and one injury among the ranks of the government troops.
- May 2016, rebels boarded an offshore oil rig and threatened the workers there.
- 25–28 July 2016, FLEC claimed to have killed nine Angolan soldiers and wounded another 14.
- 30 March 2020, inspired by a call from the Organization of Emerging African States and a similar move by SOCADEF, Cabindan militias declared a unilateral ceasefire to help combat the COVID-19 pandemic
- At least 2 FLEC-FAC guerrillas were killed in clashes with the Angolan military in June 2020
- 30 August 2022, 18 government soldiers were killed in the Necuto area of Cabinda
- On 14 April 2025, the General Staff of FLEC-FAC announced a ceasefire for two months; reasons given included the recent proposal of formal ceasefire by UNITA to Angolan parliament.
- As of June 6th, 2025, the conflict has reignited to become the most deadly since 2016, centered on Belize. Reported deaths include 4 FLEC-FAC, 18 Angolan soldiers, and at least 12 civilians.

== Human rights violations ==
The human rights situation in Cabinda has been characterised by violent resistance to peaceful protests and activists which can be seen through the Human Rights Watch report, the Angolan military and secret service have committed a number of human rights violations during the conflict. The report indicates that between September 2007 and March 2009, 38 people were arbitrarily detained, tortured, humiliated and later put on trial for alleged security crimes. The arrested included six members of the Angolan military who were charged with desertion and carrying out armed attacks, as well as a former Voice of America journalist, known for his criticism of the government. The detainees were denied contact with legal professionals or their families for prolonged periods of time. The above are considered to be a violation of the International Covenant on Civil and Political Rights. Furthermore, in order to avoid the efforts of the FLEC and other secessionist forces, reports have said that Luanda has resorted to military movements in order to stop revolts and dissidence in the Cabinda region. A Bertelsmann Stiftung investigation covering the period between 2011 and 2013, indicated that systematic human rights violations have taken place, with journalists, civil rights activists and clergy members receiving harassment after being accused of supporting FLEC. Reports by Freedom House, Bertelsmann Stiftung and Human Rights Watch also pointed out violations committed by FLEC.Additionally, Human Rights Watch has stated the FLEC have accused the Angolan government of killing at least six civilians; while claiming it had killed 11 soldiers, in response to a government army attack. The Angolan authorities have not publicly commented on this.

== See also ==
- Congo Crisis
- Casamance conflict
- Resource curse
