= Togo national football team attack =

2010 terrorist attack in Cabinda Province, Angola

Togo national football team bus attack
- Part of Cabinda War
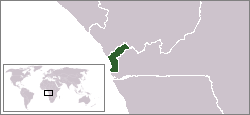
- Cabinda (green)
- Location: 5.72°S 12.28°E; Cabinda Province, Angola
- Date: 8 January 2010
- Target: Togo national football team and Angolan Armed Forces
- Attack type: Shooting
- Weapon: Machine gun
- Deaths: 3
- Injuries: 9
- Perpetrator: Front for the Liberation of the Enclave of Cabinda-Military Position (FLEC-PM)

A terrorist attack occurred on 8 January 2010 as the Togo national football team traveled through the Angolan province of Cabinda on the way to the 2010 Africa Cup of Nations tournament, two days before it began in Angola. A little-known offshoot of the Front for the Liberation of the Enclave of Cabinda (FLEC), a group promoting independence for the province of Cabinda, known as the Front for the Liberation of the Enclave of Cabinda – Military Position (FLEC-PM), claimed responsibility for the attack. Bus driver Mário Adjoua, the team's assistant manager Améleté Abalo, and media officer Stanislas Ocloo were killed, with several others injured. Secretary General of the FLEC-PM Rodrigues Mingas, currently exiled in France, claimed the attack was not aimed at the Togolese players but at the Angolan forces at the head of the convoy. Authorities reported two suspects were detained in connection with the attack.

== Attack ==
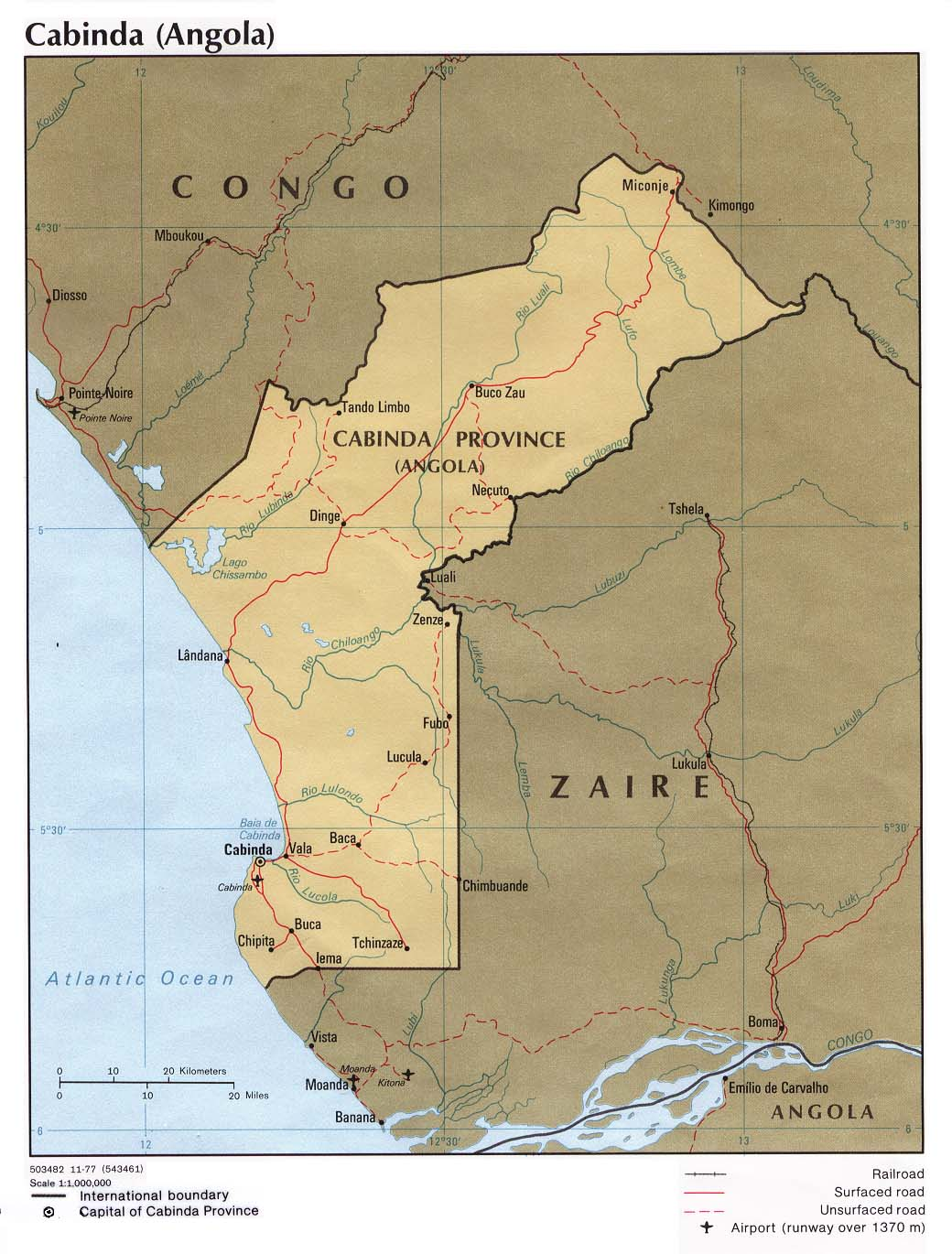
Map of Cabinda, an Angolan exclave. The main part of Angola is to the south east with the Democratic Republic of Congo in between (labelled on the map with its former name Zaire).

On 8 January 2010, the Togo national team bus was attacked by gunmen as it traveled through the Angolan province of Cabinda for the Africa Cup of Nations. The bus came under machine gun fire just after it had crossed the border from the Republic of the Congo into the Angolan exclave province of Cabinda. All of Togo's initial Group B games were to take place in the Estádio Nacional do Chiazi stadium in Cabinda.

According to rebel leader Mingas, the attack was carried out by his Commander Sametonne who claimed 15 FLEC fighters participated in the ambush. The attack lasted for at least 30 minutes. The bus driver, Mário Adjoua, was killed, cutting off all possible means of escape. The passengers hid beneath the seats. A security team of around 10 men in two cars travelling with the team returned the attackers' fire.

FC Vaslui defender Serge Akakpo was badly wounded by bullets and lost blood, as was goalkeeper Kodjovi Obilalé. Alongside both players, Vice-President Gabriel Ameyi of the Togolese Football Federation and seven members including a journalist and two team doctors were wounded. Emmanuel Adebayor said the attack was, "one of the worst things I've ever been through in my life." He had to carry his screaming teammates into the hospital as he was one of those least affected. Thomas Dossevi said, "It was a real hell. Twenty minutes of shots, of blood and fear," and Richmond Forson said, "The bus carrying the luggage was riddled. Maybe they thought we were there. Then they opened fire, even against our coaches. It was terrible." Dossevi said the team was "machine-gunned, like dogs."

The Angolan separatist guerrilla group Front for the Liberation of the Enclave of Cabinda (FLEC) claimed responsibility for the attack. A statement signed by FLEC's secretary general Rodrigues Mingas said, "This operation is just the start of a series of planned actions that will continue to take place in the whole territory of Cabinda." French Foreign Ministry spokesperson Bernard Valero said that "inciting violence is totally unacceptable" and Mingas could be prosecuted under French laws for making such statements. A larger offshoot group known as Armed Forces of Cabinda (FLEC-FAC) also claimed responsibility. The leader of the group Jean-Claude N'Zita dismissed Mingas' faction as opportunist.

=== Victims ===
Three people were killed and nine others injured in the attack.

Dead

- Améleté Abalo – assistant coach of the Togo national football team and manager of ASKO Kara (died on 9 January 2010)
- Stanislas Ocloo (died on 9 January 2010) – TV sports commentator/journalist for Togolese Television
- Mário Adjoua – Angolan-born bus driver (died on 8 January 2010)

Wounded

- Kodjovi Obilalé – was shot in the lower back. The bullet split into several pieces making its way into his stomach. The goalkeeper's condition was reportedly stabilized on 11 January. South African doctors suggested leaving bullet fragments in his stomach since the operation to remove them could possibly cause more damage.
- Serge Akakpo
- Hubert Velud – manager
- Waké Nibombé
- Elista Kodjo Lano
- Divinelae Amevor – physiotherapist
- Tadafame Wadja – doctor

== Investigation ==
In connection with the deadly attack on the Togolese national football team, the Angolan police arrested two suspects on 10 January 2010. As the national radio reported, citing the prosecutor, the arrests were made in the Angolan enclave of Cabinda, located between the Republic of Congo and the Democratic Republic of the Congo in Central Africa. A total of 9 suspects were arrested.

Angola arrested four men – Monsignor Raul Tati, a Roman Catholic priest and later bishop, Francisco Luemba, a lawyer, Belchior Tati, an economist and Jose Benjamin Fuca, a former police officer – who had documents about FLEC and had travelled to Paris for meetings with exiled leaders. In August, they were jailed for FLEC-PM membership. A court in Cabinda found the four guilty of crimes against state security; although the judge did not say whether the four had direct links to the attack. Their prison sentences ranged from three to five years. On 11 January, two FLEC operatives were arrested near the site of the shooting.

The trial was criticised by human rights groups that accused the government of using the attacks to justify a crackdown on critics. Martinho Nombo, a lawyer taking part in the court hearings, said the judge convicted them only because they had spoken or written about independence for Cabinda. "This is unconstitutional. A judge cannot jail someone for nothing. This will only worsen Angola's poor record on human rights and the whole peace process with FLEC. The supposed link was implied rather than stated. They were convicted on the basis of those documents." Human Rights Watch also criticised the conviction calling the four "activists" and saying "This is clearly a lost opportunity to restore justice in Angola, and particularly in Cabinda."

== Aftermath ==
The Togolese team called for a boycott of the competition as a result of the attack. Alaixys Romao and Thomas Dossevi spoke of their disgust and their lack of desire to compete following their experience. Togo's national football squad subsequently withdrew from the tournament. Togolese midfielder Alaixys Romao said the team was also trying to persuade the other teams in their group to pull out of the competition. After seeing the aftermath of the attack, members of the Mozambique national team flying into Luanda asked for assurances of protection.

Togo was due to play its first game of the tournament against Ghana, three days after the attack on 11 January 2010. STV Sport reported that Togo pulled out of the tournament a day later.

Later there was something of a reversal as two of the Togolese players said they would play in the African Nations Cup in "memory of the dead." Thomas Dossevi, one of the Togolese players, announced that Togo would compete "to show our national colours, our values and that we are men." The Togolese government, however, subsequently ordered the team to return home after all, on grounds of security.

On 11 January 2010, Togo was officially disqualified from the Africa Cup upon their return to their homeland. The Togolese team had left on Sunday, two days after the attack on the team bus. "The team is disqualified, this group will consist of three teams", said a spokesman for the Confédération Africaine de Football (CAF). According to Togo Sports Minister, Christophe Padumhokou Tchao, Togo's official request to re-join the tournament was denied despite the reasoning to mourn the fallen members of the team.

=== Reactions ===
Angolan government minister António Bento Bembe called it an "act of terrorism", and stepped up security at the tournament. Martin O'Neill, manager of player Moustapha Salifou at Aston Villa, expressed his shock on the club's website. Manchester City and Portsmouth football clubs expressed concerns over the safety of their players. Players from other teams in Africa, such as Benni McCarthy and Momo Sissoko, condemned the attack. Togolese Prime Minister Gilbert Houngbo ordered a three-day period of national mourning. "The government has opted for a prolonged nationwide three days of mourning period, which will begin on Monday 11 January 2010," Houngbo said on state television.

Danny Jordaan, organiser of the 2010 FIFA World Cup which was played in South Africa in June and July 2010, dismissed concerns that the attack had any relevance to the security arrangements for the World Cup.

On 12 April, Togo captain Emmanuel Adebayor announced his retirement from international football, stating that he was "still haunted by the events I witnessed on that horrible afternoon." Adebeyor subsequently returned to international duty in November 2011 following assurances from the Togo Football Federation regarding safety, making his comeback in a 1–0 win over Guinea-Bissau in a 2014 World Cup qualifier.

== See also ==
- 2009 attack on the Sri Lanka national cricket team
- List of terrorist incidents, 2010
- Munich massacre
