= Chiloango River =

River between the Democratic Republic of the Congo and the Republic of Congo

Chiloango Kakongo River, Louango River, Shiloango River, Rio Hi
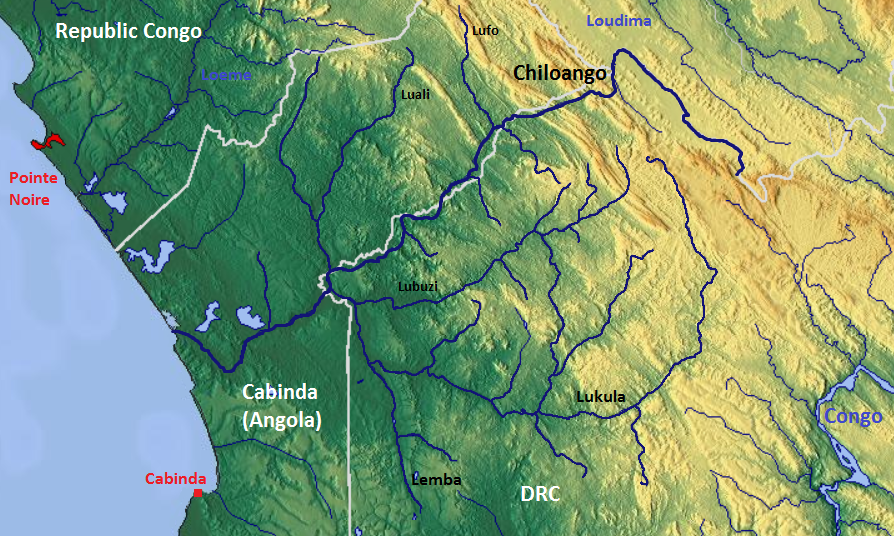
- Chiloango River basin
- Native name: Portuguese: Rio Hi

Location
- Countries: Democratic Republic of the Congo, Republic of the Congo, Angola

Physical characteristics
- Mouth: Atlantic Ocean
  - location: Near Caconga, Angola
  - coordinates: 5°12′15.85″S 12°8′0.25″E

The Chiloango River (Portuguese: Rio Chiluango, also known as Kakongo River, Louango, Shiloango and Rio Hi) is a river in western Central Africa. It forms the westernmost part of the border between the Democratic Republic of the Congo and the Republic of Congo, and then forms approximately half of the border between the DRC and Cabinda, Angola passing just south of the town of Necuto. The river then bisects Cabinda, making it the most important river in the province. It enters the Atlantic Ocean just north of the town of Cacongo.
