= Battle of Cabinda =

- Part of the Angolan Civil War
- Map showing the location of the Cabinda exclave.
Date	November 8–12, 1975
Location	Subantando, Cabinda Province, Angola
Result	MPLA–Cuban victory
Territorial changes	MPLA secures complete control of Cabinda Province

Belligerents
Zaire; FNLA; FLEC	MPLA: FAPLA; Cuba

Commanders and leaders
(Zaire) Mobutu Sese Seko; Luis Ranque Franque	Evaristo Kimba (Cuba) Ramón Argüelles

Strength
~2,000–3,000 combined infantry Zairian armored cars Mortars and light field artillery	~1,000 FAPLA militia 232 Cubans; BM-21 Grad launchers

Casualties and losses
200–300 killed or wounded Heavy loss of armored vehicles and transport trucks	10–20 killed in action ~30 wounded in action

The Battle of Cabinda was a crucial military engagement fought from November 8 until November 12 1975, in the oil-rich Angolan exclave of Cabinda, during the early stages of the Angolan Civil War.

The Battle was fought between the People's Armed Forces of Liberation of Angola (FAPLA) the armed wing of the MPLA, supported by Cuban military advisers, against a joint invasion force comprising the Front for the Liberation of the Enclave of Cabinda (FLEC) and the National Liberation Front of Angola (FNLA), heavily reinforced by regular troops from the Zaire. The victory of the joint FAPLA-Cuban forces secured the exclave and its vital offshore oil halting Zairian territorial ambitions and preserving Angola's borders on the eve of independence.

== Background ==
The exclave of Cabinda separated from mainland Angola by a narrow strip of territory belonging to Zaire, held immense economic value due to its offshore oil reserves. As Portugal prepared to withdraw following the 1974 Carnation Revolution, the political future for Cabinda became a main point of international rivalry.

Zairian President Mobutu Sese Seko sought to expand Zaire's access to the Atlantic coast and secure influence over Cabinda by backing FLEC, led by Luís Ranque Franque. Concurrently, Holden Roberto's FNLA aligned with Zairian armed forces to take control of the province from the MPLA. By October 1975 isolated FAPLA forces in Cabinda were reinforced when Cuban leader Fidel Castro dispatched an initial group of military instructors under Operation Carlota to fortify key defensive lines.

== Preparations ==
In early November 1975, the combined invading force estimated at over 2,000 troops assembled along the Zairian border. The force consisted of regular Zairian Armed Forces (FAZ) infantry, armored cars, artillery units, and FLEC-FNLA irregular fighters. The objective was to capture the provincial capital, Cabinda City, prior to November 11. The date scheduled for Angolan independence.

The FAPLA forces in the province, were comprise of roughly 1,000 local soldiers were integrated with approximately 232 Cuban military officers and instructors armed with light weapons, anti tank weapons, and Soviet-supplied 122mm BM-21 Grad multiple rocket launcher Cuban commander Ramón Argüelles, established a central defense perimeter near Subantando, a village roughly 15 kilometers from Cabinda City.

== Battle ==
=== November 8 ===
On November 8, the Zairian and FLEC armored column initiated a frontal assault against the Subantando defensive positions. As advancing Zairian columns went along narrow roads bordered by heavy vegetation, they moved directly into an established artillery firing zone.

=== November 9–12 ===
On November 9, Cuban and FAPLA units unleashed concentrated barrages using 122mm BM-21 Grad rocket launchers. The rocket fire caused heavy casualties and panic among the advancing infantry destroying motorized transport and stalling the assault. Over the next three days, subsequent attempts to breach the perimeter failed. By November 12 the invading units broke formation and retreated across the border back into Zaire territory.

== Casualties ==
=== FAPLA and Cuban Forces ===
The combined FAPLA and Cuban forces suffered 10 to 20 killed in action and approximately 30 wounded.

=== Zairian, FLEC, and FNLA ===
Zairian, FLEC, and FNLA joint column sustained far heavier losses, an estimate of 200 to 300 troops killed or wounded alongside substantial material damage, including disablsd and destroyed vehicles and abandoned artillery.
