= 2010s in Angola =

Angola-related events during the 2010s

This is a list of events in the 2010s in Angola:

== 2010 ==
- 8 January - Togo national football team bus attack. Whilst being escorted by Angolan forces through the disputed territory of Cabinda, the team bus of the Togo national football team was attacked by gunmen as it travelled to the 2010 Africa Cup of Nations tournament. The ensuing gunfight resulted in the deaths of the assistant coach, the team spokesman and bus driver, as well as injuring several others.

An offshoot of the Front for the Liberation of the Enclave of Cabinda (FLEC) claimed responsibility. Rodrigues Mingas, secretary general of the FLEC-Military Position (FLEC-PM), said that his fighters had meant to attack security guards as the convoy passed through Cabinda. "This attack was not aimed at the Togolese players but at the Angolan forces at the head of the convoy," Mingas told France 24 television. "So it was pure chance that the gunfire hit the players. We don't have anything to do with the Togolese and we present our condolences to the African families and the Togo government. We are fighting for the total liberation of Cabinda."

== 2011 ==
- February, March, November - Demonstrations are held against President José Eduardo dos Santos by young people, mostly via social media.

== 2012 ==
- 31 August - The MPLA wins the 2012 Angolan legislative election.

== 2017 ==
- 25 August 2017 - The MPLA wins the 2017 Angolan legislative election, receiving 61% of the votes according to the Angolan electoral commission.
