= Ibinda (disambiguation) =

Ibinda is a language of Cabinda, Angola. Ibinda can also refer to:

== Places ==
- Ibinda, a town in Guéra, Chad
- Ibinda, a town in Abala, Plateaux, Republic of the Congo

== Other ==
- Ibinda (Age set), a social institution among the Kalenjin people of Kenya
- Ibinda, the name used by the separatist Republic of Cabinda for its currency

== See also ==
- Ibanda
