= Post-war Angola =

For the history of post-civil war Angola, see:

- 2000s in Angola
- 2010s in Angola
- 2020s in Angola
