= N101 road (Angola) =

Road in Angola

N101 Road

Route information
- Maintained by Angola National Highways Authority

Major junctions
- North end: Sanga Mongo
- South end: Tando

Location
- Country: Angola

Highway system
- Transport in Angola

The N101 Road is a national road in Angola located in the exclave of Cabinda. The road runs north south, spanning approximately 150 kilometers from Sanga Mongo to Tando, passing through Dinge. The N101 provides a transportation link within the Cabinda region.

== Route ==
The road originates in a dense jungle near the border with the Republic of Congo, where it forms a dead end. Despite this, the road is paved and extends south to Buco Zau, intersecting with the N200. Continuing south, the paved road passes through Necuto, traversing the border area with the Democratic Republic of Congo. The N101 then turns west, exiting the dense jungle and crossing the N200 again in Dinge. From there, it proceeds south through a savannah region, punctuated by strips of forest, until reaching its terminus at Tando, where it meets the N201.

== History ==
The history of the N101 remains largely unknown. However, its strategic location near the borders with both the Republic of Congo and the Democratic Republic of Congo underscores its importance. Notably, the N101 has limited significance for internal traffic within the Cabinda exclave, making it remarkable that the entire road is paved, especially when compared to other, more critical roads in Angola that remain unpaved. As of 2014, the entire route had been paved, highlighting its prioritization despite its relatively low traffic volume.
