= Améleté Abalo =

Togolese football coach and manager (1962–2010)

- Abalo in December 2009

Personal information
- Full name: Pascal Amélété Abalo Dosseh
- Date of birth: 7 March 1962
- Place of birth: Kara, Togo
- Date of death: 9 January 2010 (aged 47)
- Place of death: Cabinda, Angola
- Position: Forward

Youth career
- 1975–1979: Dyto Lome

Senior career*
Years	Team	Apps	(Gls)
1980–1981	Dyto Lome	45	(16)
1982–1990	ASKO Kara	93	(31)

Managerial career
- 2004–2009: ASKO Kara
- 2006–2009: Togo (assistant coach)
- * Club domestic league appearances and goals

Pascal Amélété Abalo Dosseh (7 March 1962 – 9 January 2010) was the assistant coach of the Togo national football team, manager of ASKO Kara, and a retired professional footballer.

== Career ==
=== Playing career ===
Abalo began his career with Le Dynamic togolais. From 1982 to 1990, he played in the Togolese Championnat National as a striker for ASKO Kara.

=== Coaching career ===
From 2004 until his death, he coached ASKO Kara. In addition, he worked as an assistant coach for the Togo national football team since 2006.

=== Death ===
He was killed when the terrorist group Front for the Liberation of the Enclave of Cabinda attacked the Togo national football team bus in Angola when the team was travelling to play the 2010 Africa Cup of Nations.

== Honours ==
=== Club ===
ASKO Kara

- Togolese Championnat National: 2007, 2009

=== Individual ===
- Togolese Coach of the Year: 2007
