= Kodjovi Obilalé =

Togolese footballer

Personal information
- Full name: Kodjovi Dodji Akanava Obilalé
- Date of birth: 8 October 1984 (age 42)
- Place of birth: Lomé, Togo
- Height: 1.89 m (6 ft 2 in)
- Position: Goalkeeper

Youth career
- 2001–2003: Chamois Niortais
- 2002–2003: Lorient

Senior career*
Years	Team	Apps	(Gls)
2003–2006	Étoile Filante de Lomé		
2006–2008	CS Quéven		
2008–2010	GSI Pontivy	12	(0)

International career
2006–2010	Togo	5	(0)
- * Club domestic league appearances and goals

Kodjovi Dodji Akanava Obilalé (born 8 October 1984) is a Togolese former footballer who played as a goalkeeper for the Togo national team. His last club was the French amateur club GSI Pontivy. His career was cut short after he was severely injured in a rebel attack targeting the Togolese team bus in the Cabinda Province, Angola, just two days before the start of the 2010 African Cup of Nations.

== Club career ==
Born in Lomé, Obilalé began his career with Chamois Niortais, before signing a contract with FC Lorient in 2003. After one year in Lorient, he returned to Togo and signed a contract with Étoile Filante de Lomé, where he played for three years. In July 2006, he returned to France and moved to CS Quéven, where he played 39 games in one and a half year, before leaving the club in the summer of 2008 to sign a contract with GSI Pontivy.

== International career ==
Obilalé is a former member of the national team, and was called up to the 2006 FIFA World Cup. He was the only member of the World Cup squad to play for a club in Togo. He was capped five times by Togo in 2009.

== 2010 African Cup of Nations shooting ==
On 8 January, a bus carrying the Togo national football team to the African Cup of Nations was fired at by a group of rebel terrorists from Cabinda Province, Angola, just after they had crossed the Congo border. Obilalé was one of the two players who were reported to have bullet wounds. Defender Serge Akakpo, was the other player confirmed to have been shot. The driver of the bus was killed during the attack, and the assistant coach and a spokesperson later died from their wounds. Later, Obilalé was reported dead by some sources including MSNBC.com; such reports were later dismissed by his club GSI Pontivy in a press announcement, stating the player was undergoing surgery in South Africa instead. Later reports indicated that Obilalé's condition had improved following the shootout, and that he was "recovering well."

In March 2010, Obilalé returned to France to continue his rehabilitation at the Kerpape centre in Lorient; later in July, he confirmed that, as a result of the shooting, he was still suffering serious walking problems, and that he did not think about playing football anymore. Obilalé's rehabilitation was funded by FIFA, the Togo government and the French Football Federation, and the goalkeeper complained that "the only institution that did not help me, it is the Confederation of African Football".

On 30 July 2010, his contract with French football club Pontivy expired, and he stated that he had serious financial issues. He also announced his intention of denouncing the Togo Football Federation, on the grounds that it had neglected his situation. These concerns were also raised by a number of other former fellow players, including international teammate Emmanuel Adebayor, who, according to Obilalé, regularly calls him and helps him financially on his own.

On 26 July 2010, Obilalé was given the honour of taking the kick-off during a friendly game between Lorient and Rennes, which was organized to raise funds for the rehabilitation facility where he had recovered. The game was attended by more than 3,000 people.

Obilalé has since earned a diploma in special education, and works in the field of youth rehabilitation for Lorient association Remise en Jeu. In 2015, he published an autobiography, Un destin foudroyé ("A Destiny Struck").
