= Henrique N'zita Tiago =

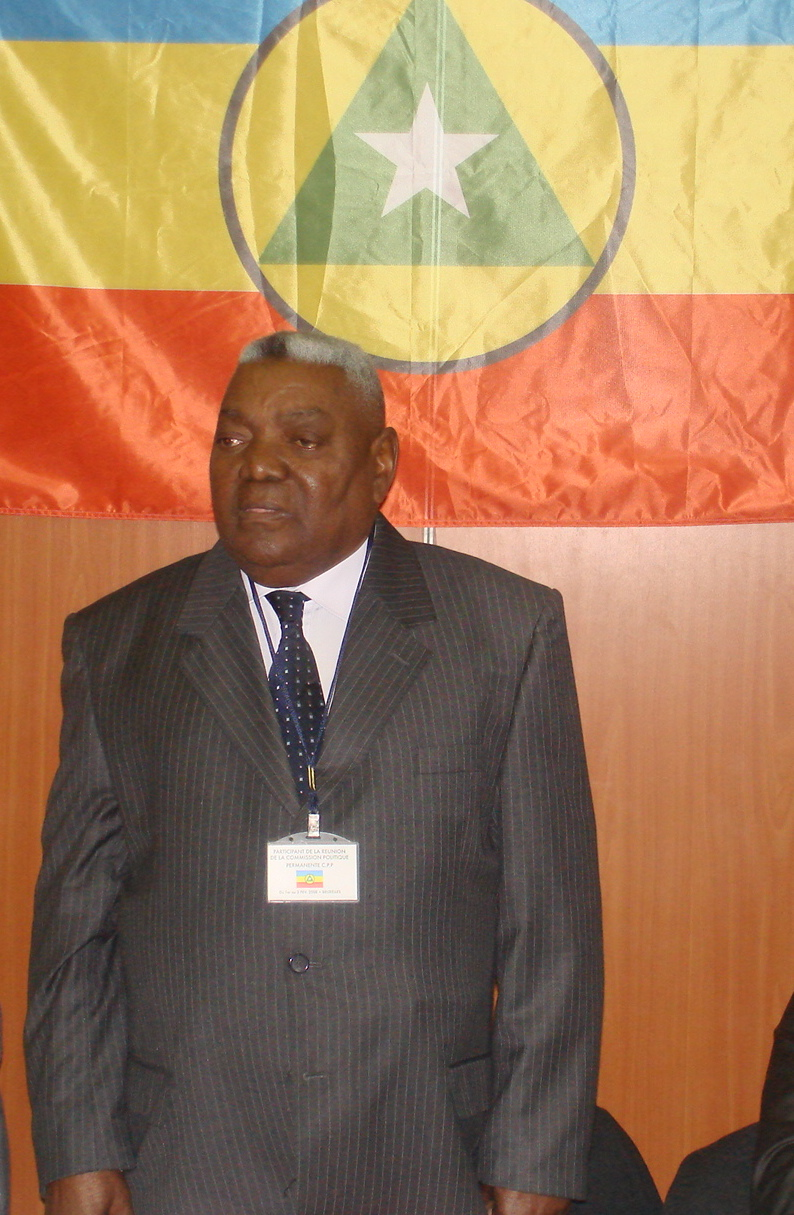
- Tiago in 2011

Commander of the Armed Forces of Cabinda
- In office 1969 – 3 June 2016
- Succeeded by: Emmanuel N'zita

Personal details
- Born: 14 July 1927 Cabinda, Portuguese Angola
- Died: 3 June 2016 (aged 88) Paris, France
- Party: FLEC
- Children: Emmanuel N'zita, Antoine N'zita, Jean-Claude N'zita

Henrique N'zita Tiago (14 July 1927 – 3 June 2016) was a commander of the Armed Forces of Cabinda, a rebel guerrilla group that fights for the independence of Cabinda from Angola. He died in Paris on 3 June 2016. It was reported that Tiago was 88 years old when he died, and that he was buried in France.

== Biography ==
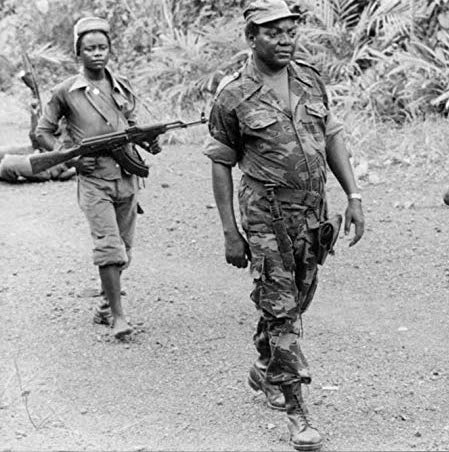
Tiago in Cabinda, 1978

He was born on July 14, 1927, at the mission of San Jose de Luali in the region of Dinge, or in Mboma Lubinda, Cabinda, into a modest family.

In 1963, he co-founded the Front for the Liberation of the Enclave of Cabinda (FLEC), a political organization that fought, at the time, against Portuguese colonial rule. Because he was part of the FLEC, he was arrested in 1970 by the colonial PIDE. He served his sentence in the São Nicolau jail in Bentiaba. He was released in 1974, opened a FLEC office in Tchiowa, the capital of Cabinda; and a year later, he was appointed chairman of the FLEC.

Upon learning that the Portuguese government was planning to include Cabinda as part of Angola, Tiago started an armed conflict against Angola's pro-independence armed groups. His intransigent position in negotiations on the status of Cabinda, opting solely for military means, caused FLEC to fragment into different factions.

He went into exile to France. Tiago died in Paris on June 3, 2016. His funeral was on June 10. Upon his death, his son, Emmanuel N'zita, succeeded him as Commander of the Armed Forces of Cabinda a few days later.

== See also ==
- Front for the Liberation of the Enclave of Cabinda
- Angolan Civil War
