= Koupossitéré Camara =

Togolese footballer

Personal information
- Date of birth: 15 December 1986 (age 39)
- Place of birth: Togo
- Position: Midfielder

Team information
- Current team: ASKO Kara

Senior career*
Years	Team	Apps	(Gls)
2009–	ASKO Kara	?	(?)

International career^{‡}
2010–	Togo	1	(0)
- * Club domestic league appearances and goals as of 19:36, 5 December 2010 (UTC) ‡ National team caps and goals as of 19:36, 5 December 2010 (UTC)

Koupossitéré Camara (born 15 December 1986) is a Togolese international footballer who plays as a midfielder for ASKO Kara.
