= Dinge =

Dinge could refer to:

- Dingé, a commune in Brittany, France
- Dinge, Angola, a commune in Cabinda Province, Angola
