= Eastern Naval Division =

- Divisão Naval da Costa do Leste (Portuguese)
- Active: 13 February 1827 – 13 March 1830
- Country: Empire of Brazil
- Branch: Imperial Brazilian Navy
- Type: Naval Division
- Role: Slave Trade suppression
- Garrison/HQ: Cabinda
- Engagements: Battle of Carmen de Patagones; Battle of Monte Santiago

The Eastern Naval Division, the East Naval Division, or the Naval Division of the African Coast was a naval base of the Brazilian Imperial Navy established in the Angolan province of Cabinda. It was created in 1827 and had as its objective the inspection of Brazilian ships regarding the observance of the 1815 treaty with British Empire about the slave trade. The fleet was composed, in variable periods of stay, by the Frigate Paraguaçu, Corvette Ânimo Grande, Brig Quinze de Agosto and the Brig-schooners Duqueza de Goyaz and Ismênia.

Although the main objective was inspection, with time it was revealed that the naval division collaborated with the increase of traffic by protecting the ships from corsair and pirate attacks, acting as a protector of the Brazilian maritime commerce. The naval base was extinguished in March 1830.

== Origins ==
Brazil had just become independent, and Great Britain conditioned the recognition of its emancipation to the abolition of the slave trade that existed in the country. To this end, meetings were held between the two countries with the objective of defining when the slave trade on the African coast should be extinguished. On November 23, 1826, a deadline was defined, and this meeting was ratified on March 13, 1827, stipulating the date of March 13, 1830, for Brazil to declare such commerce illegal.

The empire committed itself to fulfill the agreements, supervising the intense slave traffic between the Brazilian and African coasts and inspecting the ships that left the African coast to Brazil.

== Vessels ==
=== Eastern Division ===
| Vessel | Location |
|---|---|
| Dona Francisca | Cabinda |
| Ismênia | Molembo |
| Duas Estrelas | Molembo |
| Paraguaçú | Cabinda |
| Novo Brilhante | Cabinda |
| 15 de Agosto | Cabinda |
| Ânimo Grande | Cabinda |
| Duqueza de Goyaz | Cabinda |
| Bertioga | Cabinda |
| Feliz | Ambriz |
| 3 de Maio | Cabinda |
| Despique Paulistano | Molembo |

== Commander ==
| | Rank | Name | Date |
|---|---|---|---|
| 1 | R.ADM | João Bernardino Gonzaga | 13 February 1827 |
| 2 | R.ADM | David Jewett | 31 November 1827 |
| 3 | CPT | James Thompson | 25 December 1827 |
| 4 | CO | Justino Xavier de Castro | 26 December 1827 |
| 5 | CO | Bartholomeu Hayden | 19 May 1828 |
| 6 | LT | Foord Morgell | 1 November 1828 |
| 7 | LT | José Lamego Costa | 17 August 1829 |
| x | | dissolved | 13 March 1830 |
