= Belize (disambiguation) =

Belize is a country in Central America.

Belize may also refer to:

- Belize District, a district of Belize
  - Belize City, Belize's largest city
  - Belize River, a river in Belize
- Belize, Angola, a town in the Angolan province of Cabinda
- Belize Inlet, British Columbia, Canada, named for Belize City
- Belize Kazi (born 2000), Spanish rapper known professionally as BB Trickz
- British Honduras, a former British colony called Belize after 1973
- "Belize", a song by Dangermouse and Black Thought featuring MF Doom on Cheat codes

== See also ==
- La Balize, Louisiana, established by the French c. 1700
