= Joseph Tchao Kokou =

Togolese footballer

Joseph Kokou
Personal information
- Full name: Joseph Tchao Kokou
- Date of birth: January 1, 1990 (age 36)
- Place of birth: Kpalimé, Togo
- Height: 1.80 m (5 ft 11 in)
- Position: Goalkeeper

Team information
- Current team: ASKO Kara
- Number: 1

Youth career
- 2004–2007: ASKO Kara

Senior career*
Years	Team	Apps	(Gls)
2008–	ASKO Kara	60	(0)

International career
2006–2007	Togo U-23	7	(0)
2007–	Togo	1	(0)
- * Club domestic league appearances and goals

Joseph Tchao Kokou (born 1 January 1990 in Kpalimé) is a Togolese footballer, who plays for ASKO Kara.

== International career ==
He has been called up to the Togo national football team, since the June 2006 qualification to the 2008 Africa Cup of Nations and was on the squad at the 2007 UEMOA Tournament. He made his debut appearance on 6 November 2009 against Bahrain.
