= Action Committee of the Cabinda National Union =

- Comitê d'Acção de União Nacional Cabindesa
- Successor: Front for the Liberation of the Enclave of Cabinda
- Formation: 1963
- Purpose: Campaign for the independence of Cabinda province from Portugal
- Location: Cabinda province, Angola

The Action Committee of the Cabinda National Union (Portuguese: Comitê d'Acção de União Nacional Cabindesa; CAUNC) is a defunct, separatist organization that campaigned for the independence of Cabinda province from Portugal. CAUNC merged with the Movement for the Liberation of the Enclave of Cabinda (MLEC) and the Mayombe National Alliance in 1963 to form the Front for the Liberation of the Enclave of Cabinda (FLEC). Cabinda is now a province and an exclave of Angola.

== See also ==
- 1960s in Angola
- Angolan War of Independence
