= Ibinda =

Bantu language or dialect group

Ibinda (also Kibinda, Chibinda, Tchibinda, Cibinda) is ostensibly a Bantu language or a dialect group spoken in the Angolan province and exclave of Cabinda.

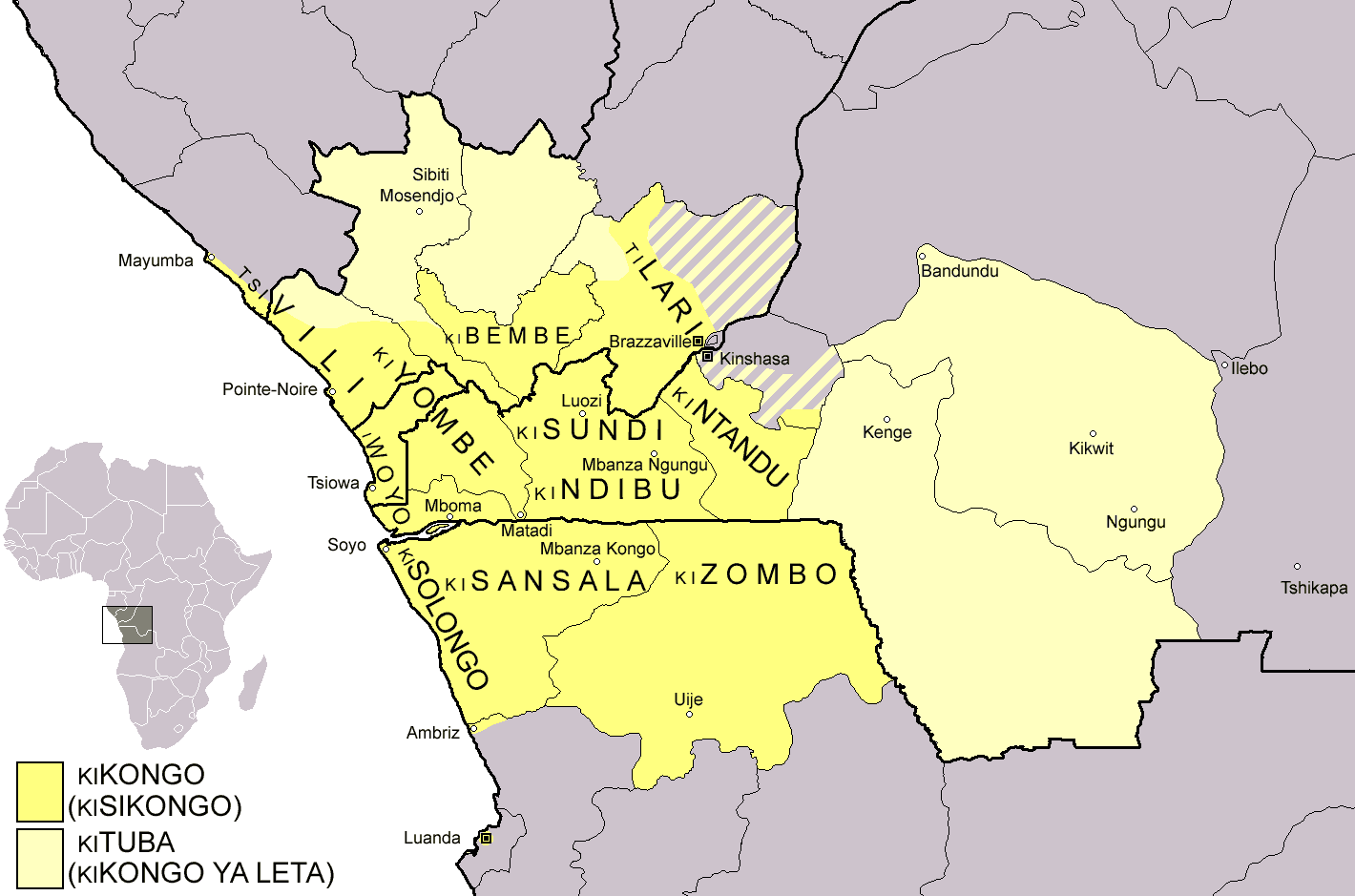
Dialect map of Kongo and Kituba

Ibinda is Western Kongo (Guthrie: H16d) as it is spoken in Cabinda. It is a combination of several dialects of the Kongo language (Kikongo) spoken by small ethnic groups in Cabinda. Among the principal ones are Iwóyo, Ikuákongo (Kakongo), Ikóchi, Ilínji (Ilinge), Kiyómbe (Quiombe), Kisúndi and Ivili although some are sometimes considered separate from Ibinda. Ibinda is a project of Cabindan separatists or nationalists who advocate the formation of a Republic of Cabinda and is the "national language" of the proposed state.

Historically, vernacular speech in Cabinda has also been called Fiote, from m'fiôte, a word meaning "black" or "colored person." Fiote referred to all local languages of Cabinda "because they were the languages spoken by black people." The term was also used to describe the inhabitants themselves and as an adjective meaning native or indigenous ("everything that was not of European origin was labeled 'fiote' – fiote papaya, mango fiote, potato fiote, etc.). However, this term is considered derogatory and is eschewed by Cabindans. "Cabindans do not like being called Fiote...[because] the word was used by the Portuguese to describe everything that was inferior – a bad road would be called a fiote road and bad food would be called fiote food." Some argue that the language should be called *Cabindese.
