= Kabinda (disambiguation) =

Kabinda may refer to the following places in the Democratic Republic of the Congo:

- Kabinda the capital of Lomami Province
- Kabinda Territory
- Kabinda District
- Roman Catholic Diocese of Kabinda

== See also ==
- Cabinda (disambiguation)
