= Luali, Angola =

Luali
- Commune
- Location in Angola Luali (Africa)
- Coordinates: 4°34′59″S 12°42′12″E
- Country: Angola
- Province: Cabinda Province
- Time zone: UTC+1 (WAT)
- Climate: Aw

Luali is a city and commune of Angola, located in the province of Cabinda.

== See also ==
- Communes of Angola
