= Abdou Bourou =

Beninese footballer

Personal information
- Full name: Abdou Samadou Bourou
- Date of birth: 13 October 2000 (age 26)
- Place of birth: Bembèrèkè, Benin
- Height: 1.74 m (5 ft 9 in)
- Position: Defender

Team information
- Current team: ASKO Kara

Senior career*
Years	Team	Apps	(Gls)
2017–2020	Les Buffles		
2020–	ASKO Kara		

International career^{‡}
2020–	Benin	1	(0)
- * Club domestic league appearances and goals as of 11 October 2021 ‡ National team caps and goals as of 11 October 2021

Abdou Samadou Bourou (born 13 October 2000) is a Beninese professional footballer who plays as a defender for Beninese club ASKO Kara and the Benin national team.
