= Cacongo =

- Town
- Location in Angola
- Coordinates: 05°14′S 12°08′E
- Country: Angola
- Province: Cabinda

Population (Census 2014)
  - Total: 15,000
- Time zone: UTC+1 (WAT)
- Climate: Aw

Cacongo (Guilherme Capelo or Lândana) is a town, with a population of 15,000 (2014), in Cacongo municipality, Cabinda Province, in Angola. The former Lândana municipality is now known as Cacongo, and the town is sometimes still known as Lândana. It is located on Lândana Bay about a kilometer south of the mouth of the Chiloango River.

== History ==
At the time of the arrival of the Portuguese in the 15th century the village was populated by the Kongo people, and was part of the Kakongo Kingdom. The Portuguese, Dutch, British and French traded along the coast in the 18th and 19th centuries, but the Portuguese formally occupied the town in 1883 following a treaty with the local king, prior to the Treaty of Simulambuco.
