= Communist Committee of Cabinda =

Communist Committee of Cabinda Comitê Comunista de Cabinda
- Leader: Kaya Mohamed Yay; Geraldo Pedro
- Founded: 1988
- Split from: Front for the Liberation of the Enclave of Cabinda
- Ideology: Communism; Marxism-Leninism
- Political position: Far-left

The Communist Committee of Cabinda (Portuguese: Comitê Comunista de Cabinda, CCC) was a militant separatist group fighting for the independence of Cabinda from Angola. The CCC was led by Kaya Mohamed Yay and Geraldo Pedro. It split off from the Front for the Liberation of the Enclave of Cabinda (FLEC) in 1988.

== See also ==
- Angolan Civil War
- Cabinda War
