= Popular Movement for the Liberation of Cabinda =

Militant separatist group in Angola

- Dates active: 1979-?
- Split from: Front for the Liberation of the Enclave of Cabinda
- Country: Angola

The Popular Movement for the Liberation of Cabinda (Portuguese: Movimento Popular de Libertação de Cabinda; MPLC) is or was a militant separatist group fighting for the independence of Cabinda from Angola. The MPLC split off from the Front for the Liberation of the Enclave of Cabinda (FLEC) in June 1979. Over the last two decades there seems to exist no evidence that the movement still exists.
