= Inhuca =

Coordinates: 4°51′S 12°24′E

- Commune
- Location in Angola
- Country: Angola
- Province: Cabinda Province
- Time zone: UTC+1 (WAT)
- Climate: Aw

Inhuca is a city and commune of Angola, located in the province of Cabinda.

== See also ==
- Communes of Angola
