= Peter Takirambudde =

Ugandan activist

- Born: Uganda
- Education: Makerere University Yale University (PhD International Business Law)
- Occupations: Lawyer, Human Rights Advocate
- Known for: Executive Director, Human Rights Watch for Sub-Saharan Africa
- Notable work: Human rights reporting in Liberia, Cabinda, Darfur, Zambia

Peter Takirambudde is the Ugandan born Executive Director of Human Rights Watch for Sub-Saharan Africa.

Before joining Human Rights Watch in 1995, he was a professor at the University of Botswana. He is a lawyer by training, and a graduate of Makerere University in Uganda. Takirambudde earned a PhD in International Business Law from Yale University, and has reported on human rights abuses in places such as Liberia and Cabinda On the subject of the Darfur conflict, he said

Regardless of whether there has been genocide, the scale and severity of the ongoing atrocities in Darfur demand an urgent international response. Given Sudan’s continuing failure to prosecute the perpetrators, the Security Council needs to refer the situation of Darfur to the International Criminal Court.

On the subject of political violence in Zambia, Takirambudde stated

If the Zambian police fail to initiate an immediate and full investigation into the killing of a leading politician, political violence in Zambia is going to continue. Justice must be served for the immediate victims of this attack, as well as for the entire population of Zambia.

== Sources ==
- University of North Carolina
- "Human Rights Watch". Human Rights Watch.
- H. W. Wilson
