= Forças Armadas de Cabinda =

Separatist armed faction in Angola

The Forças Armadas de Cabinda (FAC), or Armed Forces of Cabinda, is the armed wing of the political Cabindan nationalist group Frente para a Libertação do Enclave de Cabinda (FLEC, English: Front for the Liberation of the Enclave of Cabinda). The Movement for the Liberation of the Enclave of Cabinda (MLEC) in Léopoldville in 1959, chaired by Luis Ranque Franque, the Action Committee of the Union Nationale Cabindaise (CAUNC) in Brazzaville in 1961, chaired by Henrique N'zita Tiago and the Alliance du Mayombe (ALIAMA, named after the massive forest in the north of Cabinda) in Pointe-Noire in 1962, chaired by António Eduardo Sozinho Nzau. In 1963, the three separatist political movements merged to found the Front for the Liberation of the Enclave du Cabinda (FLEC), based in Pointe-Noire.

The goal of the FAC is the independence of the exclave of Cabinda better known as the Republic of Cabinda, from the occupation by Angola in 1975 to the present. Founded in 1977, the FAC bases its claim for Cabindan independence on the fact that Cabinda is not geographically contiguous with Angola as well as on February 1, 1885, Treaty of Simulambuco, Portugal declared them a protectorate and further in 1957, Portugal placed Cabinda and Angola under the authority of a single administrator, without modifying the Treaty of Simulambuco, but was not to make Cabinda part of Angola.

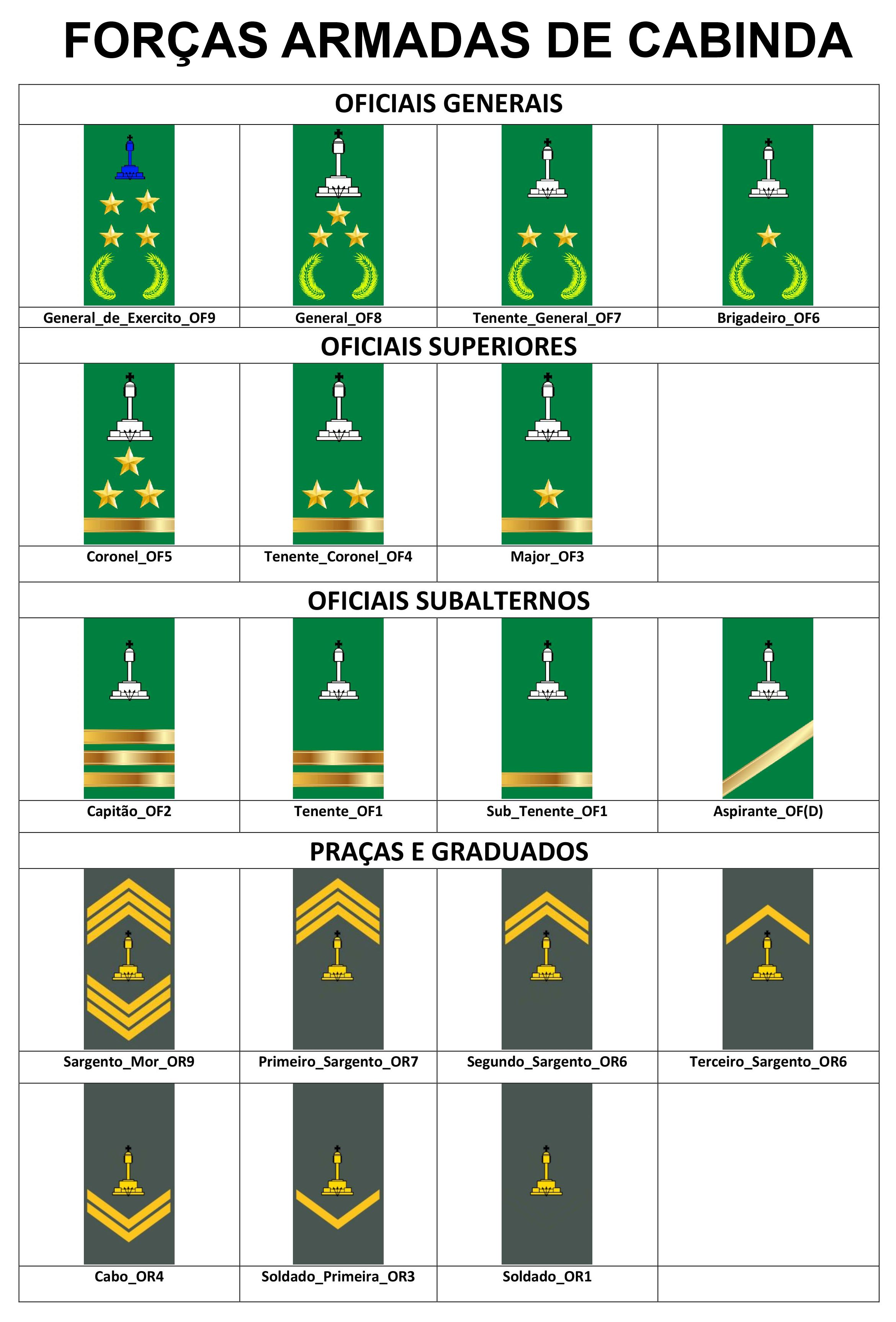
Ranks of the Forças Armadas de Cabinda

Today the FLEC-FAC army, made up of civilian volunteers inside and outside Cabinda, fights for the independence of Cabinda against the People's Movement for the Liberation of Angola (MPLA), a socialist-based political movement and the government of Angola.

The FAC contends that colonial Portuguese documents prove that Cabinda is not part of Angola's administrative borders, and was instead a separate protectorate.

== See also ==
- Front for the Liberation of the Enclave of Cabinda
