= 2020s in Angola =

Angola-related events during the 2020s

This is a list of events for the 2020s in Angola:

== 2020 ==
- 5 February – Isabel dos Santos, the billionaire daughter of former president José Eduardo dos Santos is investigated for embezzling from the state oil company and money laundering.

== 2021 ==
- 24 July to 8 August – Angola took part in the 2021 Summer Olympics.
