= Necuto =

- Commune
- Location in Angola
- Coordinates: 4°57′08″S 12°37′04″E
- Country: Angola
- Province: Cabinda Province
- Time zone: UTC+1 (WAT)
- Climate: Aw

Necuto is a city and commune of Angola, located in the province of Cabinda.

== See also ==
- Communes of Angola
