= Mayombe National Alliance =

Defunct separatist organization in Cabinda province, Angola

- Aliança Nacional do Mayombe
- Abbreviation: ALLIAMA
- Merged into: Action Committee of the Cabinda National Union and Movement for the Liberation of the Enclave of Cabinda (1963)
- Successor: Front for the Liberation of the Enclave of Cabinda
- Headquarters: Cabinda Province, Angola

The Mayombe National Alliance (Portuguese: Aliança Nacional do Mayombe; ALLIAMA) is a defunct, separatist organization that campaigned for the independence of Cabinda province from Portugal. ALLIAMA merged with the Action Committee of the Cabinda National Union and the Movement for the Liberation of the Enclave of Cabinda in 1963 to form the Front for the Liberation of the Enclave of Cabinda (FLEC). Cabinda is now a province and an exclave of Angola.

== See also ==
- 1960s in Angola
- Angolan War of Independence
- Mayombe
