= 1960s in Angola =

Angola-related events during the 1960's

The 1960s in Angola were marked by the War of Independence (1961–1975). Portuguese police arrested Agostinho Neto of the MPLA and future President of Angola (1975–1979) in 1960 for the third time. Delegates discussed Cabinda's self-determination in relation to Angola at the 4th Commission of the United Nations on Decolonization in New York in 1962. Cabinda became a member of the Organisation of African Unity (OAU) as the 39th colonized country in 1964.

== Economy ==
Angola's industries grew by an annual average rate of 17% in the 1960s as ethnic Europeans seized natives' lands and increased mineral production. Mineral exports doubled between 1965 and 1970 to 170 million pounds. In the district of Huambo, between 1968 and 1970 white-owned land more than doubled from 249,039 hectares to 526,270 hectares. Native-owned land decreased by 36.5%. The average African farm's gross income declined between 1964 and 1970 from $98.00 to $35.00 Portuguese petroleum-production began in Congo Basin in the 1960s, and in the exclave of Cabinda in 1968. Now the petroleum industry is the engine of the Angolan economy.

== See also ==
- Portuguese West Africa
