= Dinge, Angola =

Coordinates: 5°00′S 12°20′E

Dinge
- Commune
- Location in Angola
- Country: Angola
- Province: Cabinda Province
- Time zone: UTC+1 (WAT)
- Climate: Aw

Dinge is a city and commune of Angola, located in the province of Cabinda.

== See also ==
- Communes of Angola
