= ASKO Kara =

Togolese football club

ASKO de Kara
- Full name: Association Sportive de la Kozah Football Club
- Founded: 1974; 52 years ago
- Ground: Stade Municipal; Kara, Togo
- Capacity: 10,000
- Chairman: Ousmane Barqué
- Manager: Ibrahima Ayeva
- League: Togolese Championnat National
- 2025–26: Togolese Championnat National, 2nd of 14
- Website: https://www.askodekara.tg
Home colours	Away colours

ASKO de Kara or ASKO FC is a Togolese association football club based in Kara. They play in the top division in Togolese football.

== History ==
The manager Améleté Abalo was shot dead on 8 January 2010 in a terrorist attack against the Togo national football team.

== Achievements ==
- Togolese Championnat National: 9

1988, 1989, 1996, 2007, 2019–20, 2021, 2021–22, 2022–23, 2023–24.

- Coupe du Togo: 4

1975, 1976, 1987, 1995.

== Performance in CAF competitions ==
- CAF Champions League: 1 appearance

2008 – First Round
2020/21 - First Round (25/42)
2021/22 - First Round (27/42)
2022/23 - Second Round (30/47)
2023/24 - First Round (19/41)
2024/25 - Second Round

- African Cup of Champions Clubs: 1 appearance

1990: First Round

- CAF Cup: 1 appearance

1997 – First Round

- CAF Cup Winners' Cup: 4 appearances

1976 – First Round
1977 – First Round
1988 – First Round
1996 – First Round

== Current squad ==
Last update: unknown Note: Flags indicate national team as defined under FIFA eligibility rules; some limited exceptions apply. Players may hold more than one non-FIFA nationality.

No.	Pos.	Nation	Player
16	GK	TOG	Mahadiou Sama
23	GK	TOG	Vigninou Agbagla
2	DF	TOG	Bassitou Ouro-Nimini
3	DF	TOG	Abdou Samadou Bourou
5	DF	TOG	Agbotcho Magnim
8	DF	TOG	Claude Kossi Agbezudo
9	MF	TOG	Napo Germain Sonhaye
15	DF	TOG	Abdoul-Halimou Sama

No.	Pos.	Nation	Player
19	MF	TOG	Gnama Akaté
21	DF	TOG	Kossi Jean Ozou
22	DF	TOG	Daniel Agbogan
25	MF	TOG	Fabrice Akouété
26	MF	TOG	Prince Yayra Ametokodo
