= Cacongo (municipality) =

Municipality in Cabinda Province, Angola

Coordinates: 5.22343°S 12.1439°E

- Municipality
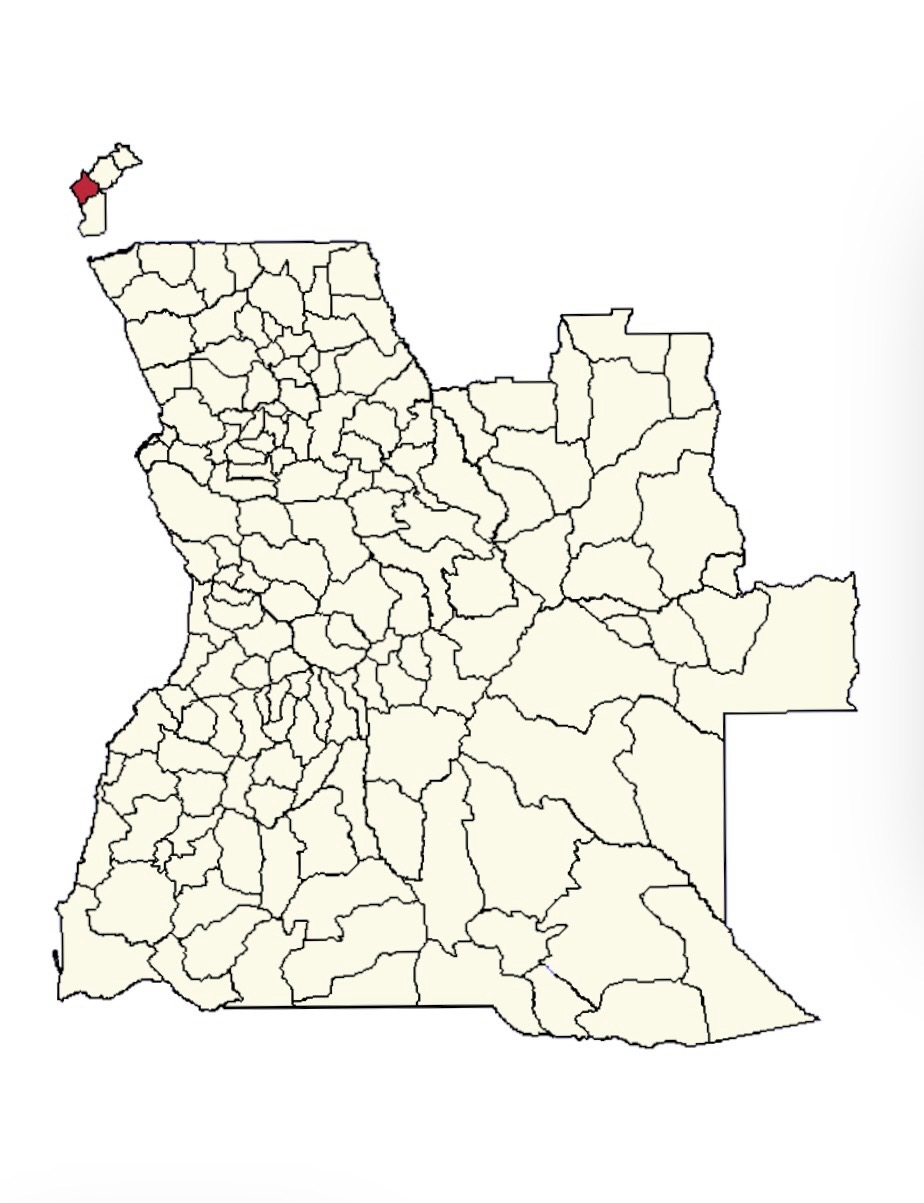
- Cacongo
- Country: Angola
- Province: Cabinda Province
- Time zone: UTC+1 (WAT)

Cacongo (ex-Lândana, Concelho de Cacongo, Malemba, or Molembo) is a municipality in Cabinda Province, an exclave of Angola. Its principal town is Cacongo. Landana lies on the coast of the Atlantic Ocean, adjacent to Landana Bay. The municipality covers 1,679 square kilometres (648 sq mi) and had a population of 39,076 at the 2014 Census; the latest official estimate (as at mid 2019) is 44,974.

== History ==
At the time of the arrival of the Portuguese in the 15th Century it was populated by the Kongo people and was the major portion of the Kingdom of Kakongo.

== Geology ==
The coast of Lândana is known by the Paleocene fossils, including Cabindachelys landanensis, Congosaurus, and Cimomia landanensis.

== See also ==
- List of lighthouses in Angola
