= Movement for the Liberation of the Enclave of Cabinda =

Defunct Angolan separatist organization

- Portuguese: Movimento para a Libertação do Enclave de Cabinda; French: Mouvement de Libération de l'Enclave du Cabinda
- Abbreviation: MLEC
- Merged into: Action Committee of the Cabinda National Union and Mayombe National Alliance
- Successor: Front for the Liberation of the Enclave of Cabinda
- Formation: 1961
- Merger of: 1963
- Purpose: Cabinda province separatism
- Location: Angola

The Movement for the Liberation of the Enclave of Cabinda (Portuguese: Movimento para a Libertação do Encrave de Cabinda; French: Mouvement de Libération de l'Enclave du Cabinda; MLEC) is a defunct, separatist organization that campaigned for the independence of Cabinda province from Portugal. MLEC merged with the Action Committee of the Cabinda National Union(which was originally a faction of MLEC) and the Mayombe National Alliance in 1963 to form the Front for the Liberation of the Enclave of Cabinda. Cabinda is now a province and an exclave of Angola.
