= Buco-Zau =

Municipality of Cabinda Province, Angola

- Municipality
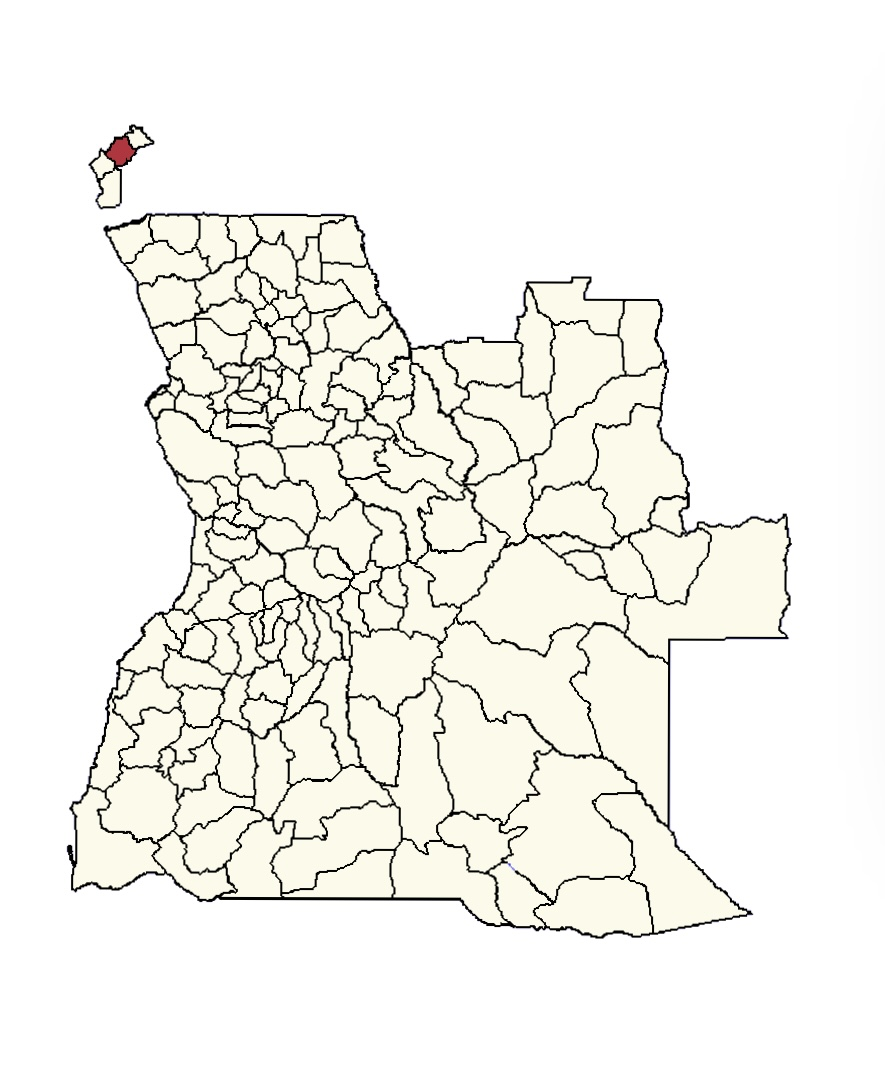
- Buco-Zau

- Location in Angola
- Coordinates: 04°45′42″S 12°32′31″E
- Country: Angola
- Province: Cabinda

Population (2014)
  - Total: 33,843
- Time zone: UTC+1 (WAT)

Buco-Zau (also spelled Buco Zau) is a municipality of Cabinda Province, Angola. The municipality is situated within the Maiombe forest and covers an area of 1,979 square kilometres (764 sq mi). Beginning in the 2000s, logging and oil companies have heavily deforested the area in and around Buco-Zau, leading to conflict with the local populace. Buco-Zau had a population of 32,792 at the time of 2014 census.

== Etymology ==
The name Buco-Zau is of Kikongo origin and was chosen on 19 May 1957 by Simão Toco, an Angolan Christian who proclaimed himself a prophet and founded his own derivative church. In Kikongo, buco and means "place", "local" or "[town] centre", while zau means elephants. Buco-Zau can therefore be translated as "place of elephants" or "land of elephants".

== Geography ==
Buco-Zau covers an area of 1,979 square kilometres (764 sq mi), 1,832 square kilometres (707 sq mi) of which is covered by the Maiombe forest, the second largest forest in the world (only behind the Amazon rainforest). The municipality has been heavily deforested over the years; researchers at José Eduardo dos Santos University's Faculty of Agricultural Sciences estimated that 1,757 square kilometres (678 sq mi) of forest in Buco-Zau had been deforested between 2000 and 2017. Since the early 2000s, locals in Buco-Zau and the neighbouring town of Fútila have been in frequent conflict with logging and oil companies in the area.

== Demographics ==
The 2014 census recorded a population of 33,843 in Buco-Zau.

== Economy ==
The economy of Buco-Zau revolves primarily around the wood industry; the municipality has the highest timber extraction rate in Angola. Other economic activities include agriculture and gold mining. Buco-Zau was the first place in Angola from which gold was exported.
