= Liberation Front of the State of Cabinda =

Separatist movement in Cabinda Province, Angola

Flag of FLEC

The Liberation Front of the State of Cabinda (Note: The official English name of the group is "Liberation Front of the State of Cabinda", while its Portuguese name translates to "Front for the Liberation of the State of Cabinda".) (Portuguese: Frente de Libertação do Estado de Cabinda; FLEC (Lopes)) is a separatist movement seeking the independence of the Angolan province of Cabinda. It was founded in the Netherlands in 1996 by a group of Cabindese expatriates.

== See also ==
- African independence movements
- List of active autonomist and secessionist movements
- Angolan Civil War
