= Luis Ranque Franque =

Angolan politician

Luis de Gonzague Ranque Franque was a Cabindan nationalist leader who served as the President of Cabinda and first president and founder of Front for the Liberation of the Enclave of Cabinda.
