= Belize, Angola =

Belize
- Town and municipality
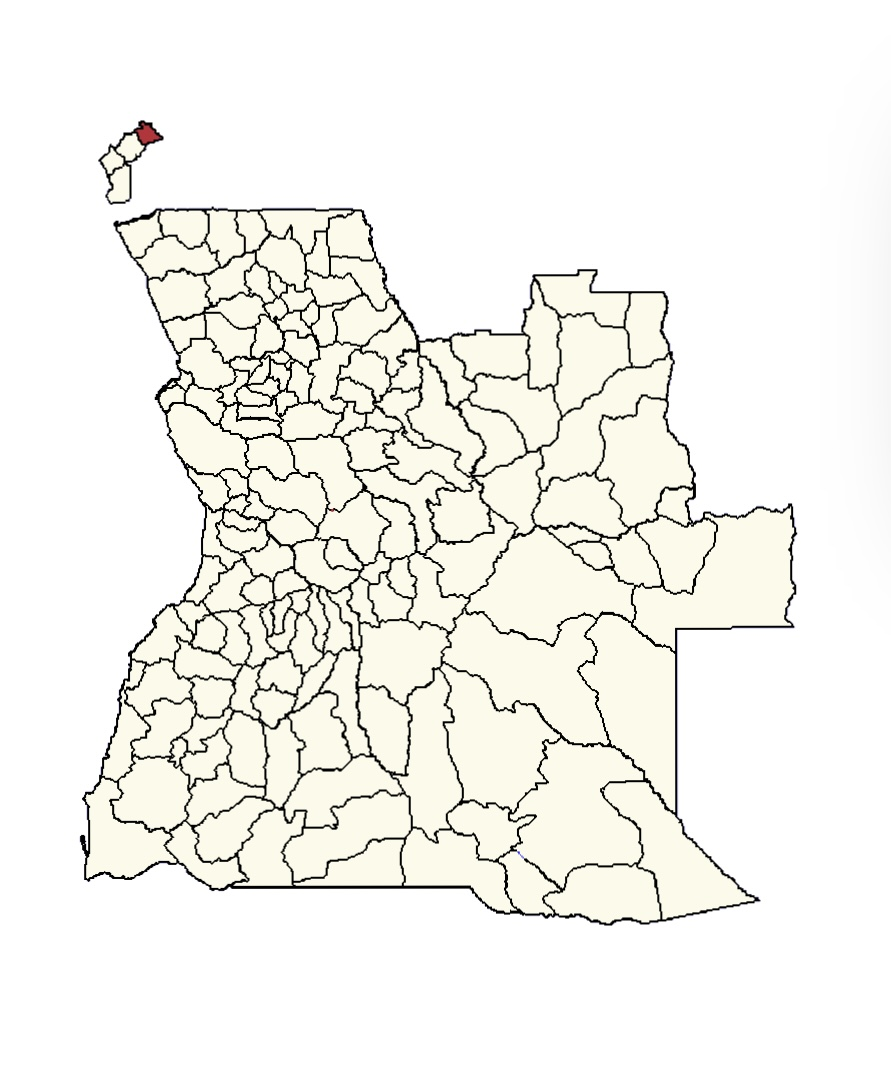
- Belize
- Country: Angola
- Province: Cabinda Province

Government
  - Mayor: Mariana Allen

Area
  - Total: 1,360 km^{2} (530 sq mi)

Population (2019)
  - Total: 22,514
- Time zone: UTC+1 (WAT)

Belize is a town and municipality in Cabinda Province in Angola. The municipality covers 1,360 km^{2} (530 sq mi), and had a population of 19,561 at the 2014 Census; the latest official estimate (as of mid 2019) is 22,514.
