= Rodrigues Mingas =

Angolan rebel

- Born: Angola
- Organization: Front for the Liberation of the Enclave of Cabinda

Rodrigo Rodrigues Mingas is the leader of the Front for the Liberation of the Enclave of Cabinda-Military Position (FLEC/PM, Portuguese: Frente para a Libertação do Enclave de Cabinda), a guerrilla independence movement fighting since 1975 for the total independence of Cabinda, one of Angola's 14 provinces which is rich with oil reserves.

Mingas is believed to live in exile in France.

== Togo football team bus attack ==
On 8 January 2010, while being escorted by Angolan forces through the disputed territory of Cabinda, the team bus of the Togo national football team was attacked by gunmen belonging to FLEC/PM as it travelled to 2010 Africa Cup of Nations tournament. The ensuing gunfight resulted in the deaths of the assistant coach, team spokesman and bus driver, as well as injuring several others. Mingas expressed "condolences", saying the team was attacked by mistake.

== See also ==
- Angolan Civil War
