= António Bento Bembe =

Angolan politician

- Education: Dartmouth College
- Occupation: General of Angolan Army
- Known for: Secretary-General of the Front for the Liberation of the Enclave of Cabinda (FLEC)

António Bento Bembe is the Secretary-General of the Front for the Liberation of the Enclave of Cabinda (FLEC), a general of Angolan Army, a minister without portfolio in the Angolan government between 2007–2009. He is the Secretary of State of the Angolan government for Human Rights, has served as the President of the Cabinda Forum for Dialogue (FCD) since its establishment in 2004. He served as President of FLEC-Renovada.

Rival Cabindan rebel groups met in Helvoirt, the Netherlands, in 2004 and formed the Cabinda Forum for Dialogue (CFD), a body dedicated to representing Cabindans in peace negotiations with the Angolan government. Bembe has served as the CFD's President since its establishment. Dutch police arrested Bembe at the Opening Session of the VII UNPO General Assembly in the Peace Palace in The Hague in the Netherlands in June 2005. The arrest came in response to a U.S. government request for extradition on kidnapping charges in relation to a Chevron worker's disappearance in 1990. The Justice Ministry arrested Bembe, but the Foreign Ministry had allowed him to enter the country, leading to a departmental rivalry over the case. Thousands of Cabindans rallied in favor of releasing Bembe and members of Parliament in Angola and Portugal expressed their support. A Dutch court released him on bail but Bembe did not report to police in November. The Dutch court then rejected extradition and Bembe returned to Angola.

== See also ==
- Angolan Civil War
