= Treaty of Simulambuco =

1885 treaty between Portugal and N'Goyo

- Type: Treaty
- Context: Scramble for Africa; Portuguese colonization of N'Goyo
- Signed: 1885
- Parties: Portuguese Empire; N'Goyo Kingdom

The Treaty of Simulambuco was signed in 1885 by representatives of the Portuguese government and officials in the N'Goyo Kingdom. The agreement was drafted and signed in response to the Treaty of Berlin, which was an agreement between the colonizing European powers about how to divide up Africa. The long-established Portuguese, not wanting to miss out on the Scramble for Africa involving territories near its own old possessions, began to colonize deeper than the numerous trading ports it had controlled on the African coast since the early 16th century. In contrast to the violent struggles between the Portuguese and some native peoples in Mozambique, the colonization of Cabinda was peaceful.

Portugal first claimed sovereignty over Cabinda in the February 1885 Treaty of Simulambuco, which gave Cabinda the status of a protectorate of the Portuguese Crown under the request of "the princes and governors of Cabinda". Article 1 of the treaty, states, "the princes and chiefs and their successors declare, voluntarily, their recognition of Portuguese sovereignty, placing under the protectorate of this nation all the territories by them governed". Article 2, which is often used in separatist arguments, goes even further: "Portugal is obliged to maintain the integrity of the territories placed under its protection." The treaty was signed between the emissaries of the Portuguese Crown and the princes and notables of Cabinda, giving rise to three territories within the Portuguese protectorate of Cabinda: Cacongo, Loango and Ngoio.

Cabinda was incorporated into the Portuguese Empire separately from its larger southern neighbour Angola even though, at the time, the two were separated merely by the Congo River and a strip of land of the Democratic Republic of Congo. In 2005, Cabindans celebrated the 120th anniversary of the treaty, to the annoyance of Angolan officials, who view the treaty as running counter to their claim that the territory is an exclave. This dispute over the treaty has led to an ongoing separatist conflict.

== See also ==
- Chronology of Western colonialism
- Scramble for Africa
