= Front for the Liberation of the Enclave of Cabinda =

Cabindan guerilla movement for the independence of Cabinda Territory

- Movimento para a Libertação do Enclave de Cabinda (in Portuguese)
- Emblem of the movement
- Leader: Rodrigues Mingas
- Dates active: 1963 – present
- Active regions: Cabinda province, Angola
- Ideology: Cabinda province independence
- Status: Active
- Wars: Angolan War of Independence; Angolan Civil War; Cabinda War

Map of the Cabinda region which is an exclave out of Angola.

The Front for the Liberation of the Enclave of Cabinda (Portuguese: Frente para a Libertação do Enclave de Cabinda, FLEC) is a guerrilla and political movement fighting for the independence of the Angolan Territory of Cabinda. Formerly under Portuguese administration, with the independence of Angola from Portugal in 1975, the territory became an exclave province of the newly independent Angola. The FLEC fights the Cabinda War in the region occupied by the former kingdoms of Kakongo, Loango, and N'Goyo.

== Background ==
Older flag of FLEC

On February 1, 1885, the Treaty of Simulambuco was signed, establishing Cabinda as a Portuguese protectorate. The protectorate was immediately linked to the much larger colony of Angola, however, Cabindan separatists such as the FLEC maintain that the treaty "recognised [Cabinda's] special status." Regardless of the treaty, the Estado Novo of Antonio Salazar made Cabinda an integral part of Angola in 1956. This came shortly after a reminder from the United Nations Secretary General to Salazar that Portugal has an obligation to report on its self-governing territories, so instead merged Cabinda into Angola, which was administered as an "overseas province" which was an "integral part" of Portugal.

== History ==
Starting in the 1960s regionally based liberation movements emerged throughout the Portuguese Empire, sparking the Portuguese Colonial War including various groups that sought Cabinda's independence. In 1963, three of these organizations — the Movement for the Liberation of the Enclave of Cabinda (MLEC), Action Committee of the Cabinda National Union (CAUNC), and the Mayombe National Alliance (ALLIAMA) — merged to form the FLEC at a conference in Pointe-Noire in Congo-Brazzaville.

Despite being the main liberation movement, the FLEC was not the only Cabindan separatist group, with the FLEC competing with the Movement for the Liberation of Cabinda (MOLICA) and Union of Cabindan People (UPC) for support.

FLEC broke into three factions; FLEC-Ranque Franque, FLEC-N'Zita, led by Henrique N'zita Tiago, and FLEC-Lubota, led by Francisco Xavier Lubota. In November 1977 another faction, the Military Command for the Liberation of Cabinda, was created. In June 1979 the Armed Forces for the Liberation of Cabinda created another movement, the Popular Movement for the Liberation of Cabinda (MPLC, Movimento Popular de Libertação de Cabinda). In the 1980s FLEC received help from the National Union for the Total Independence of Angola (UNITA), which opposed the MPLA-controlled government of Angola, and from South Africa. In 1988, the Communist Committee of Cabinda (CCC, Comité Comunista de Cabinda) left the FLEC, led by Kaya Mohamed Yay. In the 1990s another faction, the National Union for the Liberation of Cabinda (União Nacional de Libertação de Cabinda), led by Lumingu Luís Gimby, was created.

Another group was created by Cabindese expatriates in the Netherlands in 1996, the "Frente de Libertação do Estado de Cabinda" (FLEC (Lopes), Liberation Front of the State of Cabinda).

In December 2002, Angolan Armed Forces announced the capture of FLEC-Renovada.

FLEC-FAC has continued its struggle for independence both inside and outside Cabinda. In October 2006 FLEC-FAC asked for intervention by the African Union's Commission on Human and Peoples' Rights.

=== Togo football team bus attack ===
On 8 January 2010, while being escorted by Angolan forces through the disputed territory of Cabinda, the team bus of the Togo national football team was attacked by gunmen as it travelled to 2010 Africa Cup of Nations tournament. The ensuing gunfight resulted in the deaths of the assistant coach, team spokesman and bus driver, as well as injuring several others.

An offshoot of the FLEC claimed responsibility. Rodrigues Mingas, secretary general of the Front for the Liberation of the Enclave of Cabinda-Military Position (Flec-PM), said his fighters had meant to attack security guards as the convoy passed through Cabinda. "This attack was not aimed at the Togolese players but at the Angolan forces at the head of the convoy," Mingas told France 24 television. "So it was pure chance that the gunfire hit the players. We don't have anything to do with the Togolese and we present our condolences to the African families and the Togo government. We are fighting for the total liberation of Cabinda."

== Kidnappings ==
Members of the group have taken several foreign citizens hostage in Cabinda. In May 2000, FLEC-FAC kidnapped three foreign and one local employee of a Portuguese contractor who were released in two months.

== External relations ==
During the Cold War the FLEC received a good deal of financial, military and arms support from Mobutu Sese Seko, the dictator of neighboring Zaire. The FLEC also saw limited support from the governments of Gabon and France. All of these foreign supporters sought Cabinda's independence to secure lucrative oil rights in the region.

Similarly, nations with a vested investment in the Angolan oil industry have historically opposed the FLEC, namely the United States especially during the Presidency of Bill Clinton after the United States' former primary proxy in the region, UNITA kidnapped 17 foreign oil workers in Soyo. The Chevron Corporation, which maintains a company town in Malembo, has hired mercenaries such as Executive Outcomes to fight against the FLEC.

== See also ==
- Republic of Cabinda
- Cabinda War
- African independence movements
- List of active autonomist and secessionist movements
