= Cabinda Province =

Exclave and province of Angola

Cabinda
- Province
- Seal Logo

- Cabinda, exclave of Angola
- Country: Angola
- Alvor Agreement: 15 January 1975
- Capital: Cabinda

Government
  - Type: Provincial government
  - Governor: Suzana Fernanda Pemba Massiala de Abreu
  - Vice-Governor for the Economic Services: Macário Romão Lembe
  - Vice-Governor for the Political and Social Sector: Miguel dos Santos de Oliveira
  - Vice-Governor for Technical Services and Infrastructures: Juliano Cuabi Niongue Capita

Area
  - Total: 7,290 km^{2} (2,810 sq mi)

Population (census 2024)
  - Total: 903,370
  - Density: 124/km^{2} (321/sq mi)
- ISO 3166 code: AO-CAB
- HDI (2022): 0.688 medium · 2nd
- Website: cabinda.gov.ao

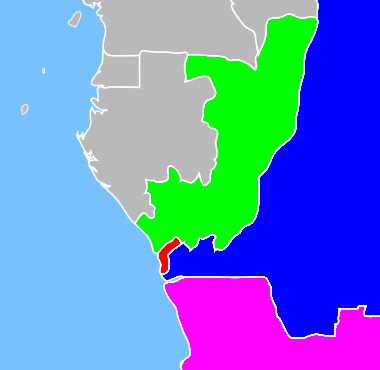
Cabinda Republic of the Congo Democratic Republic of the Congo Angola

Cabinda (Kongo: Kabinda) is an exclave and province of Angola, a status that has been disputed by several political organisations in the territory. The capital city is also called Cabinda, known locally as Tchiowa, Tsiowa or Kiowa. The province is divided into four municipalities—Belize, Buco-Zau, Cabinda and Cacongo.

Modern Cabinda is the result of a fusion of three kingdoms: N'Goyo, Loango and Kakongo. It has an area of 7,290 km^{2} (2,810 sq mi) and a population of 903,370 at the 2024 census. According to 1988 United States government statistics, the total population of the province was 147,200, with a near even split between rural and urban populations. At one point an estimated one third of Cabindans were refugees living in the Democratic Republic of the Congo; however, after the 2007 peace agreement, refugees started returning to their homes.

Cabinda is separated from the rest of Angola by a narrow strip of territory belonging to the Democratic Republic of the Congo (formerly known, up until 1960, as the Belgian Congo), which bounds the province on the south and the east. Cabinda is bounded on the north by the Republic of the Congo (formerly known as French Congo), and on the west by the Atlantic Ocean. Adjacent to the coast are some of the largest offshore oil fields in the world. Petroleum exploration began in 1954 with the Cabinda Gulf Oil Company, when the territory was under Portuguese rule.

Cabinda also produces hardwoods, coffee, cacao, rubber, and palm oil products; however, petroleum production accounts for most of Cabinda's domestic product. Cabinda produces 700,000 barrels (110,000 m^{3}) of crude oil per day. Cabinda Oil is associated with Sonangol, Agip Angola Lda (41%), Chevron (39.2%), TotalEnergies (10%) and Eni (9.8%).

In 1885, the Treaty of Simulambuco established Cabinda as a protectorate of the Portuguese Empire, named the Protectorate of the Portuguese Congo. Cabindan independence movements consider Angola's post-colonial occupation of the territory to be illegal. While the Angolan Civil War largely ended in 2002, an armed struggle persists in the exclave of Cabinda. Some of the factions have proclaimed an independent Republic of Cabinda, with offices in Paris.

== History ==
=== Portuguese Congo ===
Portuguese explorers, missionaries, and traders arrived at the mouth of the Congo River in the mid-15th century, making contact with the Manikongo, the powerful King of the Bakongo tribe. The Manikongo controlled much of the region through affiliation with smaller kingdoms, such as the Kingdoms of Ngoyo, Loango, and Kikongo in present-day Cabinda.

Over the years, the Portuguese, Dutch, and English established trading posts, logging camps, and small palm oil processing factories in Cabinda. Trade continued and the European presence grew, resulting in conflicts between the rival colonial powers. Between 1827 and 1830, the Imperial Brazilian Navy maintained a naval base in the western part of Cabinda, making it the only Brazilian colony outside of South America.

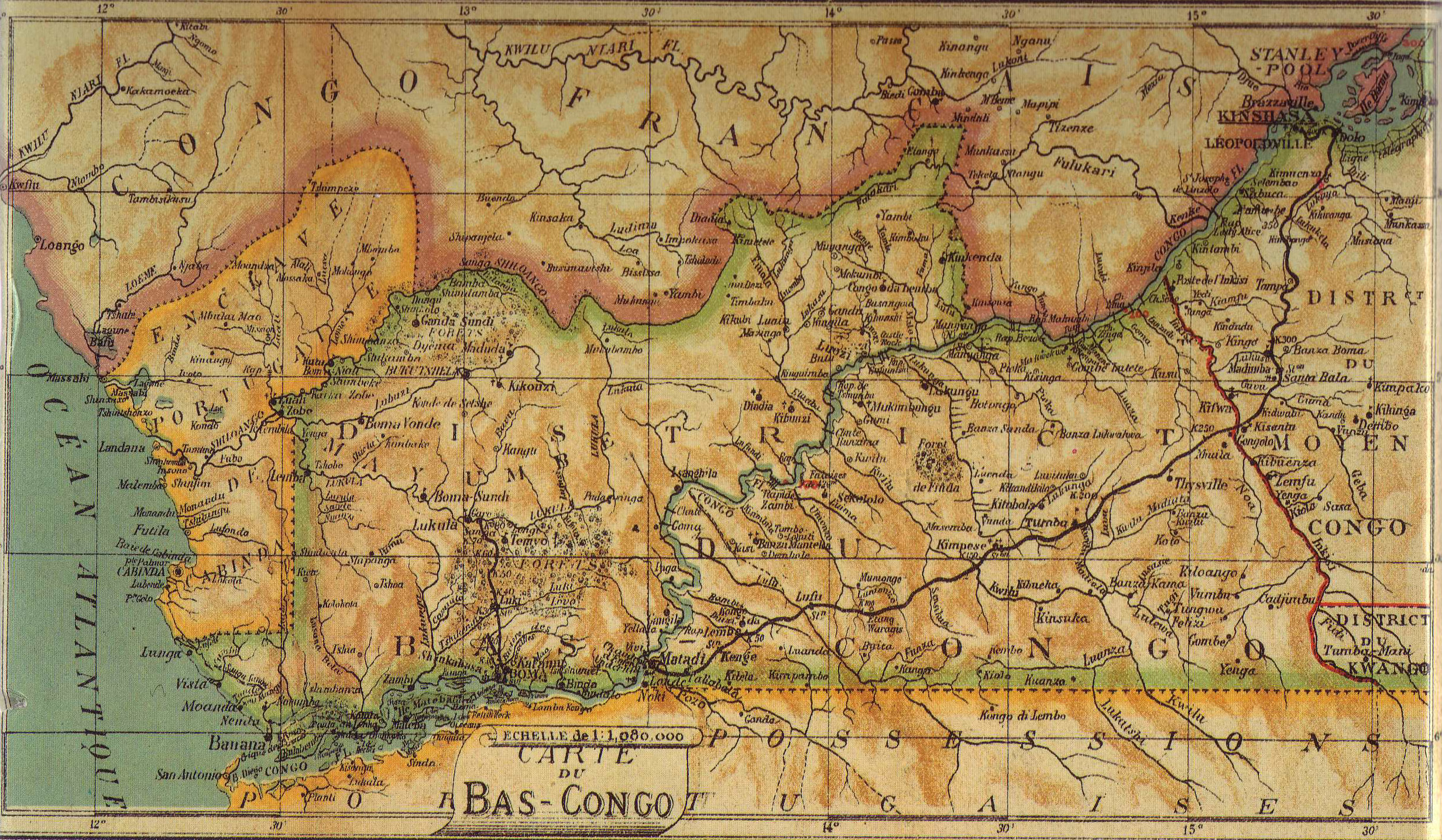
1913 map of Bas-Congo and Cabinda

Portugal first claimed sovereignty over Cabinda in the February 1885 Treaty of Simulambuco, which gave Cabinda the status of a protectorate of the Portuguese Crown under the request of "the princes and governors of Cabinda". This is often the basis upon which the legal and historical arguments in defense of the self-determination of modern-day Cabinda are constructed. Article 1, for example, states, "the princes and chiefs and their successors declare, voluntarily, their recognition of Portuguese sovereignty, placing under the protectorate of this nation all the territories by them governed" [sic]. Article 2, which is often used in separatist arguments, goes even further: "Portugal is obliged to maintain the integrity of the territories placed under its protection". The Front for the Liberation of the Enclave of Cabinda (FLEC-R) argues that the above-mentioned treaty was signed between the emissaries of the Portuguese Crown and the princes and notables of Cabinda, then called Portuguese Congo, giving rise to not one, but three protectorates: Cacongo, Loango, and Ngoio.

Through the Treaty of Simulambuco in 1885 between the King Luis I of Portugal and the princes of Cabinda, a Portuguese protectorate was decreed, reserving rights to the local princes and independent of Angola. Cabinda once had the Congo River as the only natural boundary with Angola, but in 1885, the Berlin Conference extended the territory of the Congo Free State along the Congo River to the river's mouth at the sea.

During this time rubber was harvested and traded in Cabinda. Atrocities such as the cutting of hands were also committed there, although comprehensive reports on these atrocities were more scant and less publicly known compared to the neighbouring Congo Free State.

=== Administrative merger with Angola ===
By the mid-1920s, the borders of Angola had been finally established in negotiations with the neighbouring colonial powers. Thence onwards Angola and Cabinda were treated distinctively under the Portuguese constitution of 1933 until 15 January 1975 under the Alvor Agreement.

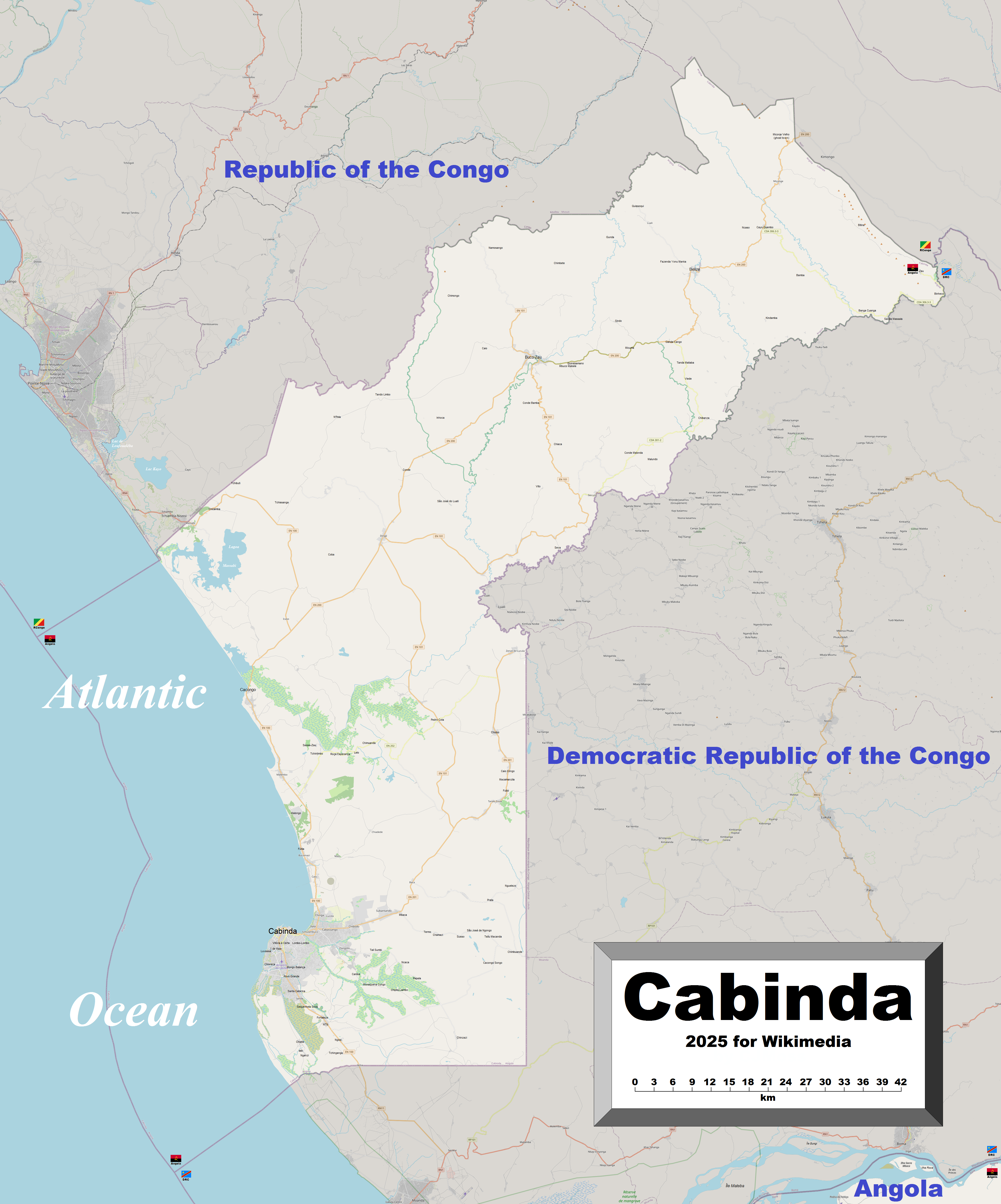
Detailed map of Cabinda Province

The Portuguese constitution of 1933 distinguished between the colony of Angola and the protectorate of Cabinda, but in 1956, the administration of Cabinda was transferred to the governor-general of Angola. The legal distinction of Cabinda's status from that of Angola was also expressed in the Portuguese constitution of 1971. Yet, when Angola was declared an "overseas province" (Província Ultramarina) within the empire of Portugal in 1951, Cabinda was treated as an ordinary district of Angola. In 1972, the name of Angola was changed to "State of Angola".

Under Portuguese rule, Cabinda was an important agricultural and forestry centre, and in 1967, it discovered huge offshore oilfields. Oil, timber, and cocoa had been its main exports until then. The town of Cabinda, the capital of the territory, was a Portuguese administrative and services centre with a port and airfield. The beaches of Cabinda were popular with Portuguese Angolans.

=== After independence of Angola from Portugal ===
A 1974 military coup in Lisbon overthrew the authoritarian regime established by António de Oliveira Salazar that had prevailed in Portugal for decades. The new government decided immediately to grant all Portuguese colonies the independence for which nationalist guerilla movements had been striving. In Angola, the decolonisation process took the form of a violent conflict between the different guerilla movements and their allies. In 1975, the Treaty of Alvor between Portugal and National Liberation Front of Angola (FNLA), People's Movement for the Liberation of Angola (MPLA) and National Union for the Total Independence of Angola (UNITA) reconfirmed Cabinda's status as part of Angola. The treaty was rejected by the Front for the Liberation of the Enclave of Cabinda and other local political groups which advocated for separate independence. Since then, Cabinda has been, on the one hand, a normal Angolan province, but on the other hand, there has been persistent political protest against this status; the "Kabinda Free State" says the exclave was a Portuguese protectorate until Angola invaded in 1974. They also say they control 85% of Cabinda's territory and invite proposals for joint ventures. A number of guerrilla actions have also occurred in Cabinda.

=== Secessionism ===
==== Ethnic grounds for self-determination ====
The arguments for self-determination are based on Cabindans' cultural and ethnic background. Prior to the Treaty of Simulambuco, three kingdoms existed in what is now referred to as Cabinda: Cacongo, Ngoyo, and Loango. The Cabindans belong to the Bakongo ethnic group whose language is Kikongo. The Bakongo also comprise the majority of the population in Uíge and Zaire provinces of Angola. However, despite this shared ancestry, the Cabindans developed a very different culture and distinct variants of the Kikongo language.

==== Secessionist history ====
In the early 1960s, several movements advocating a separate status for Cabinda came into being. The Movement for the Liberation of the Enclave of Cabinda (MLEC) was formed in 1960 under the leadership of Luis Ranque Franque. Resulting from the merger of various émigré associations in Brazzaville, the MLEC rapidly became the most prominent of the separatist movements. A further group was the Alliama (Alliance of the Mayombe), representing the Mayombe, a small minority of the population. In an important development, these movements united in August 1963 to form a united front. They called themselves the FLEC, and the leadership role was taken by the MLEC's Ranque Franque.

In marked contrast with the FNLA, the FLEC's efforts to mobilize international support for its government in exile met with little success. In fact, the majority of Organization of African Unity (OAU) members, concerned that this could encourage separatism elsewhere on the continent, committed to the sanctity of state borders and firmly rejected recognition of the FLEC's government in exile.

In January 1975, Angola's MPLA, FNLA and UNITA liberation movements signed the Alvor Agreement with Portugal, to establish the modalities of the transition to independence. FLEC was not invited.

On 1 August 1975, at an OAU summit in Kampala which was discussing Angola in the midst of its turbulent decolonization process, Ranque Franque proclaimed the independence of the "Republic of Cabinda". Zairian President Mobutu Sese Seko called for a referendum on the future of Cabinda.

FLEC formed a provisional government, led by Henriques Tiago. Luiz Branque Franque was elected president. Following the declaration of Angolan independence in November 1975, Cabinda was invaded by forces of the Popular Movement for the Liberation of Angola (MPLA), with the support of Cuban troops. The MPLA overthrew the provisional FLEC government and incorporated Cabinda into Angola.

For much of the 1970s and 1980s, FLEC operated a low intensity guerrilla war, attacking Angolan government troops and economic targets, or creating havoc by kidnapping foreign employees working in the province's oil and construction businesses.

The National Union for the Liberation of Cabinda (Portuguese: União Nacional de Libertação de Cabinda; UNLC), a militant separatist group, emerged in the 1990s under the leadership of Lumingu Luis Gimby.

In April 1997, Cabinda joined the Unrepresented Nations and Peoples Organization, a democratic and international organization whose members are indigenous peoples, occupied nations, minorities and independent states or territories. In 2010, Cabinda became a charter member of the Organization of Emerging African States (OEAS).

==== Recent history ====
An ad-hoc United Nations commission for human rights in Cabinda reported in 2003 that many atrocities had been perpetrated by the MPLA. In 2004, according to Peter Takirambudde, executive director of the Human Rights Watch mission for Africa, the Angolan army continued to commit crimes against civilians in Cabinda.

Although the Angolan government says FLEC is no longer operative, this is disputed by the Republic of Cabinda and its Premier, Joel Batila.

Earlier increases in the price of oil have made Cabinda's untapped onshore oil reserves a valuable commodity.

===== Peace deal =====
In July 2006, after ceasefire negotiations in the Republic of Congo, António Bento Bembe – as a president of Cabindan Forum for Dialogue and Peace, and vice-president and executive secretary of FLEC – announced that the Cabindan separatist forces were ready to declare a ceasefire. Bembe is the leader of the "Cabindan Forum for Dialogue", an organization which represents most Cabindan groups. The peace was recognized by the United States, France, Portugal, Russia, Gabon, Democratic Republic of the Congo, Republic of the Congo, Japan, South Korea, the European Union and the African Union.

"We're going to sign a cease-fire with the Angolans who in return have accepted the principle of granting special status to Cabinda", he announced, implying that while his group is resigned to be a part of Angola, they have gotten a promise of some form of autonomy.

From Paris, FLEC-FAC contended Bembe has no authority or mandate to negotiate with the Angolans, and that the only acceptable solution is total independence.

===== Togo football team bus attack =====
On 8 January 2010, the bus carrying the Togo national football team traveling through Cabinda en route to the 2010 Africa Cup of Nations tournament was attacked by gunmen, even though it had an escort of Angolan forces. The ensuing gunfight resulted in the deaths of the assistant coach, team spokesman and bus driver, and caused injuries to several others as well.

An offshoot of the FLEC claimed responsibility. Rodrigues Mingas, secretary general of the Front for the Liberation of the Enclave of Cabinda-Military Position (FLEC-PM), said his fighters had meant to attack security guards as the convoy passed through Cabinda. "This attack was not aimed at the Togolese players but at the Angolan forces at the head of the convoy", Mingas told France 24 television. "So it was pure chance that the gunfire hit the players. We don't have anything to do with the Togolese and we present our condolences to the African families and the Togo government. We are fighting for the total liberation of Cabinda."

== Economy ==
Consisting largely of tropical forest, Cabinda produces hardwoods, coffee, cocoa, crude rubber, and palm oil. The product for which it is best known, however, is its oil. Conservative estimates say that Cabinda accounts for close to 60% of Angola's oil production, estimated at approximately 900,000 barrels per day (140,000 m^{3}/d), and it is estimated that oil exports from the province are worth the equivalent of US$100,000 per annum for every Cabindan. Yet Cabinda remains one of the poorest provinces in Angola. An agreement in 1996 between the national and provincial governments stipulated that 10% of Cabinda's taxes on oil revenues would be given back to the province, but Cabindans often feel that these revenues do not benefit the population as a whole, largely because of corruption. The private sector, particularly the oil industry, has both affected and been affected by the secessionist conflict. During the early days of Cabinda's struggle, the oil companies were perceived as sympathetic to, if not supportive of, Cabinda's self-determination cause. The strategy used by the separatists to gain international attention, was most evident in 1999 and 2000. During 1999, FLEC-R kidnapped four foreign workers (two Portuguese and two French citizens), but released them after several months, having failed to attract the attention of the international community. FLEC-FAC also increased its activities during 2000 with the more widely publicized kidnapping of three Portuguese workers employed by a construction company, while FLEC-R kidnapped another five Portuguese civilians. These hostages were not freed until June 2001, following diplomatic intervention by the governments of Gabon and the Republic of the Congo.

== Municipalities ==
The province of Cabinda consists of four municipalities (Portuguese: municípios); listed below with their areas (in km^{2}) and populations at the 2014 Census and according to the latest official estimates:

Name	Area (in km^{2})	Population Census 16 May 2014	Population Estimate 1 July 2019
Belize	1,360	19,561	22,514
Buco-Zau	1,979	32,792	37,741
Cabinda	2,273	624,646	718,915
Cacongo	1,679	39,076	44,974
Provincial Totals	7,290	716,076	824,143

The city of Cabinda contains 87% of the provincial population. The other three municipalities lie to the north of the city.

== Communes ==
The province of Cabinda contains the following communes (Portuguese: comunas); sorted by their respective municipalities:

- Cabinda Municipality: – Cabinda, Malembo, Tanto-Zinze
- Cacondo Municipality: – Cacongo, Dinge, Massabi
- Buco-Zau Municipality: – Buco-Zau, Inhuca, Necuto
- Belize Municipality: – Belize, Luali, Miconge (Miconje)

== Geology ==
Two giant oil fields, the Malonga North and Malonga West were discovered in 1967 and 1970, respectively, both pre-salt or pre-Aptian producers.

Located in water depths of 50 to 75 m, oil was discovered in Barremian deposits in 1971, then the Cenomanian section in 1979.

Four offshore oil fields, the Wamba, Takula, Numbi and Vuko, are located in the greater Takula area, producing from the Upper Cretaceous, Cenomanian Vermelha sandstone deposited in the coastal environment.

Cretaceous and Paleocene vertebrates, including fossil turtles as Cabindachelys have been collected from Lândana.

== List of governors of Cabinda ==
Governors of Cabinda
Name	Years in office
Evaristo Domingos Kimba	1975–1978
Luis Doukui Paulo de Castro	1979–1980
Manuel Francisco Tuta a.k.a. Batalha de Angola	1980–1982
Armando Fandame Ndembo	1982–1984
Jorge Barros Chimpuati	1984–1991
Augusto da Silva Tomás	1991–1995
José Amaro Tati	1995–2002
José Aníbal Lopes Rocha	2002–2009
Mawete João Baptista	2009–2012
Aldina Matilde Barros da Lomba Katembo	2012–2017
Eugénio César Laborinho	2017–2019
Marcos Alexandre Nhunga	2019–2022
Mara Regina da Silva Baptista Domingos Quiosa	2022–present

Up to 1991, the official name was Provincial Commissioner

== Notable people ==
- Eduardo Camavinga (born 2002), French football player

== See also ==
- Early Congolese history
