= Elections in Angola =

Elections in Angola take place within the framework of a multi-party democracy. The National Assembly is directly elected by voters, while the leader of the party or coalition with the most seats in the National Assembly automatically becomes President.

== Latest election ==
Party	Presidential candidate	Votes	%	Seats	+/–
MPLA	João Lourenço	3,209,429	51.17	124	−26
UNITA	Adalberto Costa Júnior	2,756,786	43.95	90	+39
Social Renewal Party	Benedito Daniel	71,351	1.14	2	0
National Liberation Front of Angola	Nimi Ya Simbi	66,337	1.06	2	+1
Humanist Party of Angola	Florbela Malaquias	63,749	1.02	2	New
CASA–CE	Manuel Fernandes	47,446	0.76	0	−16
National Patriotic Alliance	Quintino Moreira	30,139	0.48	0	0
Nationalist Party for Justice in Angola	Dinho Chingunji	26,867	0.43	0	New
Total		6,272,104	100.00	220	0
Valid votes		6,272,104	97.18		
Invalid votes		74,259	1.15		
Blank votes		107,746	1.67		
Total votes		6,454,109	100.00		
Registered voters/turnout		14,399,391	44.82		
Source: National Electoral Commission

== Electoral history ==
Although Angola had sent representatives to the Portuguese Parliament in the early 19th century, it was not until the 1920s that the Portuguese authorities consented to the creation of a legislative body in the territory. In 1922 a Legislative Council was established, elected by Portuguese settlers. However, the council was suppressed following the 1926 coup in Portugal.

In 1955 a new Legislative Council was established, although only those officially classed as "civilised" were allowed to vote. This effectively limited the franchise to European settlers, most mulattos and a small number of Europeanised Africans (Assimilados). In May 1972 the Portuguese parliament passed the Organic Law for the Overseas Territories, which provided for greater autonomy for overseas territories; this created a 53-member Legislative Assembly for Angola, of which 32 would be elected, with the remainder nominated by public services, religious groups and business groups. Elections were held in March 1973, but due to continued restrictions on suffrage, only 584,000 people registered to vote out of a total population of 5,673,046. Around 86% of those registered cast votes, and the elected members included 29 Europeans and 24 Africans.

Following independence in 1975, the outbreak of the Angolan Civil War delayed the country's first post-independence elections until 1980. By then, the MPLA had created a one-party state. It organised indirect elections, in which voters elected carefully vetted candidates to electoral colleges, who in turn elected the National Assembly. The next elections were due to be held in 1983, but they were delayed until 1986 due to the ongoing war. When they were held, it was under the same indirect system.

The Bicesse Accords ended the civil war in 1991 and saw the introduction of multi-party democracy. General elections were held in 1992, with the President being elected by the public for the first time. The MPLA won 129 of the 220 seats in the National Assembly, whilst UNITA emerged as the main opposition party with 70 seats. José Eduardo dos Santos of the MPLA and Jonas Savimbi of UNITA received the most votes in the first round of the presidential elections, but Savimbi claimed the election had been rigged, despite United Nations observers stating that they had been mostly free and fair. He refused to participate in the runoff, and restarted the civil war.

The civil war ended in 2002 following Savimbi's death. However, elections were delayed until 2008. The MPLA received over 80% of the vote, winning 191 of the 220 seats in the National Assembly. Presidential elections were scheduled for 2009, but a new constitution promulgated in 2010 scrapped direct elections for the presidency, with the leader of the largest party in the National Assembly automatically becoming president. The next elections in 2012 saw another landslide victory for the MPLA, although their vote share was reduced to 72% and they lost 16 seats.

== Electoral system ==
=== President ===
The 1992 constitution provided for the direct election of the president. However, this was abolished by the 2010 constitution, which in Article 109 states that "the individual heading the national list of the political party or coalition of political parties that receives the most votes in the general election shall be elected President of the Republic and Head of the Executive".

=== National Assembly ===
The electoral system for the National Assembly is based on the electoral law passed on 1 November 1991. The 220 members are elected in two ways: 90 are elected from 18 five-seat constituencies and 130 from a single nationwide constituency, both using closed list proportional representation. The D'Hondt method is used for seat allocation in the provincial constituencies and a simple quota largest remainder method is used for the nationwide constituency.

Voters and candidates must be at least 18 years old and hold Angolan citizenship. They can be disqualified by having an undischarged bankruptcy or criminal conviction, being declared insane, or holding dual nationality. Members of the government, judiciary and armed forces and chairs of boards of state-owned companies are ineligible for election.

== Parliamentary election results ==
Party	Election						
Party	1980	1986	1992	2008	2012	2017	2022
MPLA	229	173	129	191	175	150	124
UNITA	–	–	70	16	32	51	90
FNLA	–	–	5	3	2	1	2
Others	–	116	16	10	11	18	4
Total	229	289	220	220	220	220	220
Turnout	–	–	91.35%	87.36%	62.77%	76.13%	45.65%
