= Dandy (disambiguation) =

A dandy is a man who places particular importance upon his physical appearance.

Dandy may also refer to:

== People ==
- Dandy (surname)
- Dandy (nickname)
- Dandy Nichols (1907–1986), English actress born Daisy Sander
- El Dandy, ring name of Mexican professional wrestler Roberto Gutiérrez Frías (born 1962)
- James Edgar Dandy, British botanist (1903-1976)

== Entertainment ==
- Dandy (EP), by Herman's Hermits
- "Dandy" (song), a song by the Kinks which was also performed by Herman's Hermits
- The Dandy, British children's comic
- Dandy (video game) for Atari 8-bit computers
- El Dandy (TV series), a Mexican television series

== Places ==
- Dandy, Virginia, United States, an unincorporated community
- Dandy Lake, Idaho, United States
- Common nickname for Dandenong, Victoria, Australia, a suburb of Melbourne

== Other uses ==
- C.D. Dandy, a Honduran football club from 1982 to 1984
- Dandy (mascot), a former mascot of the New York Yankees
- Dandy Dam, Pakistan
- Dandy loom, a cotton loom
- Dandy (paddle steamer), built in England in 1823
- Dandy rig, a British term for a sailing rig, similar to a yawl
- HB-Flugtechnik Dandy, an Austrian ultralight aircraft
- Dandie Fashions, sometimes called Dandy Fashions, a 1960s London boutique
- Tomica Dandy, a series of model cars by Takara Tomy
- Dandy, one of three animated advertising mascots of Golden Crisp breakfast cereal

== See also ==
- The Dandys, a British indie-pop act formed in 1996
- Dande, a municipality in Bengo Province in Angola
- Dandi (disambiguation)
- Dendy (disambiguation)
- Vincent d'Indy
