= Tanda =

Tanda may refer to:

== Places ==
- Tanda, Ambedkar Nagar, India, a city and municipal board
- Tanda (Bor), Serbia, a village
- Tanda, Bengal, a historical medieval city
- Tanda, Bhopal, a village in India
- Tanda Dam and Lake, in Pakistan
- Tanda Department, a department in Ivory Coast
- Tanda, Egypt, a town
- Tanda, Gujrat, a town in Pakistan
- Tanda, Ivory Coast, a town in Ivory Coast
- Tanda, Mansehra, a village in Pakistan
- Tanda, Niger, a village and rural commune
- Tanda, Raebareli, a village in Uttar Pradesh, India
- Tanda, Rampur, India, a city and municipal board
- Tanda, Russia, a rural locality (selo) in the Sakha Republic, Russia

== People ==
- Nicola Tanda (1928–2016), Italian philologist, literary critic and writer
- Dario Tanda (born 1995), Dutch-born footballer

== Other uses ==
- Tanda (informal loan club), voluntary rotating loan associations
- Tanda (milonga), a collection of songs in the same genre played by an orchestra
- MV Tanda, a coaster or coastal trading vessel originally named Empire Seacoast

== See also ==
- Danda (disambiguation)
- Tonda (disambiguation)
