= Danda (disambiguation) =

Danda is a punctuation character (।) used in the Devanagari script (used to write Indic languages) to mark the end of a sentence.

Danda may also refer to:

== Stake and law ==
- Daṇḍa (Hindu punishment), punishments for criminal activity in Hindu law
- Indian Penal Code translation in Hindi Bharatiya Danda Samhita
- Indian sceptre
- Walking stick (Sanskrit daṇḍa), a stick used to facilitate walking

== Culture ==
- Danda Nata (or Danda Nacha and Danda Jatra), traditional dance festival in Indian state of Odisha
- Dandiya Raas, a religious folk dance originating from the Indian state of Gujarat
- Gillidanda, a traditional sport in the Indian subcontinent
- Dandasana, a Yoga position

== Literature ==
- Danda (novel), a book by Nkem Nwankwo

== Places ==
- Dandakaranya, a jungle mentioned in the Indian epic Ramayana
- Danda kingdom, a frequently featured region and kingdom in the Ramayana and Hindu mythology
- Danda Garhwa, an administrative block of Garhwa district, Jharkhand, India
- Danda Nagraja temple, a Hindu temple in Pauri Garhwal district, Uttarakhand, India
- Diba Danda, a peak in Uttarakhand, India
- Draupadi Ka Danda, two peaks in the Gangotri range of Garhwal Himalaya in Uttarakhand, India
- Paungda Danda, a hill in Nepal
- Shrawan Danda, a hill in Butwal, Nepal
- Mount Danda, in Nantou and Hualien, Taiwan

== People with the name ==
- Danda (footballer) (born 1962), Rosângela Rocha, Brazilian footballer
- Danda Mohamed Kondeh, Sierra Leonean economist and politician
- Danda Venkata Subba Reddy, Indian professor of medicine
- Bronislav Danda (1930–2015), Czech ice hockey player
- Lankapura Dandnatha, general of Parakramabahu I of the Kingdom of Polonnaruwa
- Mahamadou Danda (born 1951), Nigerien politician and Prime Minister of Niger
- Raul Danda, an Angolan politician

== See also ==
- Tanda (disambiguation)
- Dandi (disambiguation)
- Danda Gopuram a 1981 Indian Malayalam-language film
- Dande Vittal, an Indian politician from Telangana
- Upayas (diplomacy), a Hindu and Jain method of diplomacy
