= Dandi =

Dandi may refer to:

== Places ==
- Dandi, Iran, a city in Zanjan Province
- Dandi, Navsari, a village in Gujarat, India, destination of Mahatma Gandhi's Salt March
- Dandi Census Town, a Census Town in Maharashtra, India
- Dandi, Nigeria, a Local Government Area in Kebbi State

== People ==
- Dandamis (real name Dandi or Dandi-Swami), 4th century BC Indian philosopher
- Daṇḍin or Dandi, 6th-7th century Indian writer in Sanskrit
- Dandi Adigal Nayanar, Hindu saint
- Dandi Daley Mackall, American Christian author

== Other uses ==
- The plural of danda, a punctuation character in Indic scripts
- Sticks used in Indian classical dance
- Jagamohana Ramayana, also called Dandi Ramayana, the Odia retelling of the Ramayana
- Dandi, one of three dinosaur mascots of NC Dinos, a Korean professional baseball team

== See also ==
- Dande, a municipality in Bengo Province in Angola
- Dandy (disambiguation)
- Danda (disambiguation)
