= Ansia Camuanga Correia =

Angolan politician

Ansia Camuanga Correia is an Angolan politician for the MPLA and a member of the National Assembly of Angola.
