= Abel Lourenço Chocolate =

Angolan politician

Abel Lourenço Chocolate is an Angolan politician for the MPLA and a member of the National Assembly of Angola.
