= Manuel Vicente =

Angolan politician (born 1956)

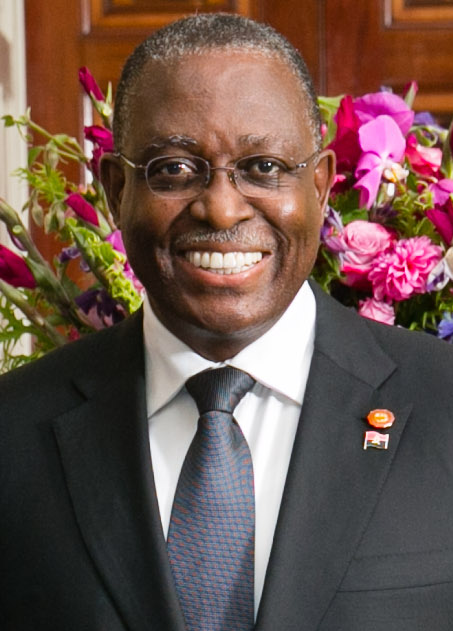

2nd Vice President of Angola
- In office 26 September 2012 – 26 September 2017
- President: José Eduardo dos Santos
- Preceded by: Fernando da Piedade Dias dos Santos
- Succeeded by: Bornito de Sousa

Personal details
- Born: 15 May 1956 (age 70) Luanda, Portuguese Angola
- Party: MPLA
- Spouse: Marinela Vicente
- Children: 2
- Education: Agostinho Neto University

Manuel Domingos Vicente (born 15 May 1956) is an Angolan politician who served as the second vice president of Angola between September 2012 and September 2017. He was chief executive officer of Sonangol, Angola's state oil company, from 1999 to 2012, and he briefly served in the government as the minister of State for Economic Coordination in 2012.

== Early life and education ==
Born at Sambizanga neighborhood in Luanda, his father was a shoemaker while his mother was a laundress. Vicente was raised by President José Eduardo dos Santos eldest sister, Isabel Eduardo dos Santos. He received primary and secondary education at the São Domingos Mission School. However, his studies was interrupted by financial problems and he worked as a locksmith and linotypist to help support the family. He earned an electronic engineering degree at the University of Angola (Agostinho Neto University) in 1983. In his professional training, Vicente had his degrees Substation and Transmission Lines, Furnas / Brazil-1985 Business Management of Petroleum, London, 1991, Marketing of Petroleum and its Derivatives, London-1991 Economics of Oil Operations - Petroleum Institute, London, 1991, Risk Analysis and Decision in the Oil Industry (OGCI) - Calgary 1992 petroleum Economics - (OGCI) - London 1992, among others connected to the oil industry.

== Career ==
Vicente worked as a chief engineer during the 1980s, and from 1987 to 1991 he headed the technical department of the Ministry of Oil. In 1991, he was appointed Deputy Director-General of Sonangol, the state oil company. In 1999, President José Eduardo dos Santos appointed him as head of Sonangol. In that key post, he presided over the most important sector of the Angolan economy. During his time in charge of the company, oil production increased dramatically. He routinely traveled abroad, acquiring "an excellent reputation from the international business community".

In 1996 Vicente founded Banco Africano de Investimentos with Mario Palhares, the former deputy governor of Angola’s central bank and with Joaquim Costa David, previous head of Sonangol and later Minister of Finance. Using correspondent accounts with the U.S. subsidiary of HSBC and offshore companies, which HSBC did not raise any concerns about, this set up became a money laundry for the Angolan elites. In 2010, a US Senate Committee on Homeland Security and Governmental Affairs presented this as a case history.

In December 2009, Vicente was appointed a member of the Political Bureau of the Popular Movement for the Liberation of Angola (MPLA), the ruling party.

A September 2011 report in Novo Jornal claimed that dos Santos intended for Vicente to be his successor and was followed by a flurry of speculation. Vicente was, however, reappointed for another term at the head of Sonangol in December 2011, briefly tempering the speculation.

On 30 January 2012 dos Santos appointed Vicente as Minister of State for Economic Coordination; Francisco de Lemos José Maria succeeded Vicente at Sonangol. In line with earlier speculation, the move was generally interpreted by observers as suggesting that dos Santos was positioning Vicente as his eventual successor. It appeared that Vicente's government post would give him a great deal of authority in managing the economy, and it would bolster Vicente's credibility and experience given that he had previously only been involved in the oil industry. Nevertheless, it was believed that some other leading figures in the ruling party were skeptical about Vicente, given his relative inexperience in politics, and could be trying to resist the President's efforts to position him for the succession.

Agence France-Presse reported in February 2012, citing an MPLA source, that Vicente would have the second spot on the MPLA's candidate list for the 2012 election, behind dos Santos, and would become Vice President of Angola after the election. As anticipated, the MPLA Central Committee designated President dos Santos as head of the MPLA party list and Vicente as the second candidate on the list on 13 June 2012. The MPLA won the election, and Vicente took office as Vice President on 26 September 2012.

In August 2014, Vicente participated in the United States–Africa Leaders Summit, an initiative of the American president, Barack Obama, held in Washington DC under the theme "Investing in the future of Africa."

In September 2014 Vicente attended the 69th General Assembly of the United Nations in New York City. He defended a reform in the UN Security Council, which should “be more in line with the international context and reflect an equal geographical representation through the increase in the number of permanent members”, namely by including an African country. He approached issues such as the resurgence of armed conflicts, the religious fundamentalism in some African countries, the importance of disarmament and the combating of drug and human trafficking and transnational organized crime.

In December 2016, the MPLA chose João Lourenço, the Minister of Defense and Vice-President of the MPLA, as the party's top candidate and therefore its presidential candidate for the 2017 election. Lourenço, and not Vicente, was thus expected to succeed dos Santos as President.

In 2020, Vicente was described as mastermind of a triumvirate alongside Leopoldino Fragoso do Nascimento and Manuel Hélder Vieira Dias Junior, who built a secret banking network to transfer millions of dollars out of Angola.

== Personal life ==
Vicente is married to Marinela Vicente and has 2 children.

== Awards ==
In November 2014, Vicente was distinguished with the "Sirius Award" by the multinational corporation Deloitte.

Political offices
Preceded by Fernando da Piedade; Dias dos Santos	Vice President of Angola; 2012–2017	Succeeded by Bornito de Sousa
