= Revolutionary Youth of Angola =

Angolan political movement

The Revolutionary Youth of Angola (Juventude Revolucionária de Angola) is a political movement in Angola. The secretary general is Alicerces Paulo Bartolomeu, also known as Ali Mango, a member of the National Assembly of Angola.
