= Jofre Van-Dúnem Júnior =

Angolan politician

Minister of Trade of Angola
- In office 2017–2020
- President: João Lourenço

Personal details
- Born: Luanda, Angola
- Party: MPLA
- Occupation: Politician

Jofre Van-Dúnem Júnior is an Angolan politician. He is a member of parliament and was the Minister of Trade from 2017 until 2020. He is a member of MPLA.
