= Vice President of Angola =

Angolan political office

Vice President of the Republic of Angola
- Emblem of Angola

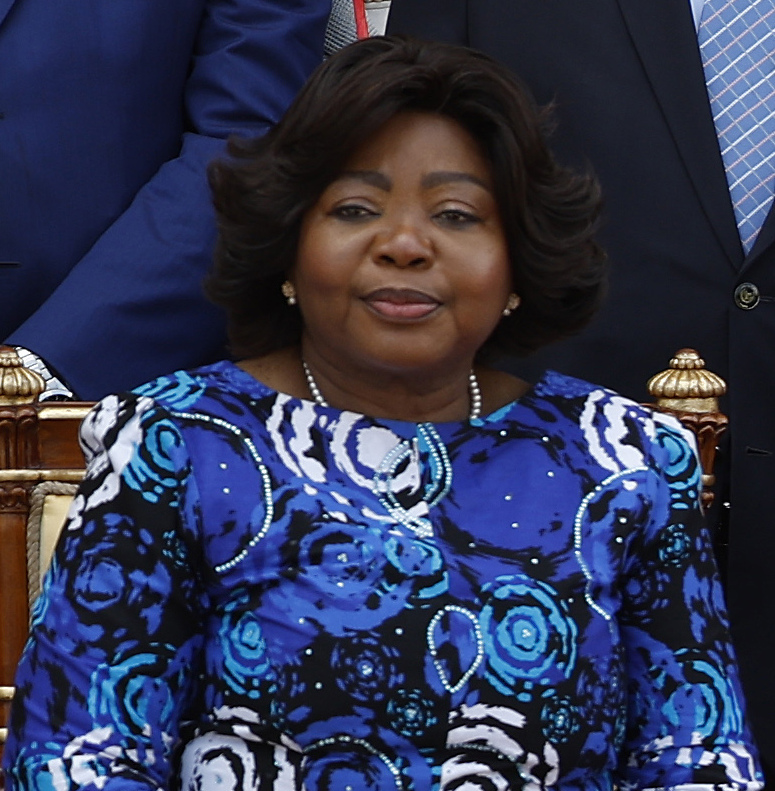
- Incumbent; Esperança da Costa since 15 September 2022
- Term length: 5 years, renewable once
- Inaugural holder: Fernando da Piedade Dias dos Santos
- Formation: 18 February 2010
- Salary: 843,371.06 Kwanzas annually

The vice president of Angola is the second highest political position in Angola; it is appointed by and is the deputy to the president. The position was established by the constitution of 2010.

== Vice presidents of Angola (2010–present) ==
No.	Portrait	Vice President	Took office	Left office	Time in office	Party	President	Ref.
1	Fernando da Piedade Dias dos Santos	Fernando da Piedade Dias dos Santos (1950–2025)	18 February 2010	25 September 2012	2 years, 220 days	MPLA	José Eduardo dos Santos	
2	Manuel Vicente	Manuel Vicente (born 1956)	26 September 2012	25 September 2017	4 years, 364 days	MPLA	José Eduardo dos Santos	
3	Bornito de Sousa	Bornito de Sousa (born 1953)	26 September 2017	14 September 2022	4 years, 353 days	MPLA	João Lourenço	
4	Esperança da Costa	Esperança da Costa (born 1961)	15 September 2022	Incumbent	3 years, 358 days	MPLA	João Lourenço	

== See also ==
- Angola
  - President of Angola
    - List of presidents of Angola
  - Prime Minister of Angola
    - List of prime ministers of Angola
  - List of colonial governors of Angola
  - List of heads of state of Democratic People's Republic of Angola
  - List of heads of government of Democratic People's Republic of Angola
- Lists of incumbents
- List of national leaders
