= Julião Mateus Paulo =

Angolan politician (born 1942)

Provincial Commissioner of Benguela
- In office 1979–1981
- Preceded by: Garcia Vaz Contreiras
- Succeeded by: Kundi Paihama

Minister of State Security
- In office 1981–1986
- Preceded by: Kundi Paihama
- Succeeded by: Kundi Paihama

Secretary-General of the MPLA
- In office 12 December 2003 – 27 August 2016
- Preceded by: João Lourenço
- Succeeded by: Paulo Kassoma

Personal details
- Born: December 30, 1942 (age 83) Bengo, Angola
- Party: MPLA

Julião Mateus Paulo is an Angolan politician and former Secretary-General of the People's Movement for the Liberation of Angola (MPLA). He is widely known by his wartime nom de guerre, Dino Matrosse.

He succeeded João Lourenço as MPLA Secretary-General at a December 2003 party congress.

Paulo was the fourth candidate on the MPLA's national list in the September 2008 parliamentary election. He won a seat in this election, in which MPLA won an overwhelming majority in the National Assembly.

Political offices
Preceded by Garcia Lourenço Vaz Contreiras	Provincial Commissioner of Benguela; 1979-1981	Succeeded by Kundi Paihama
Preceded by Kundi Paihama	Minister of State Security; 1981-1986	Succeeded by Kundi Paihama
