= Clarice Mukinda =

Angolan politician

Clarice Mukinda is an Angolan politician. He is a member of the National Assembly of Angola. He was elected in 2017.

In addition, Mukinda is in the National Union for the Total Independence of Angola.
