= Abortion in Angola =

Abortion in Angola is only legal if the abortion will save the woman's life or health and in case of rape or fetal impairments. Any abortion performed under different conditions subjects the woman and the person who performs the procedure to up to five years in prison (Penal Code - Article 154). If the woman dies as a result of the abortion or if the practitioner performs abortions on a routine basis, the criminal charges are increased by one-third (Art. 155).

== Legal status ==
Under the 1886 Portuguese Penal code, left unaltered after Angola's independence in 1975, access to abortion was very restricted, being available only in case the pregnancy threatened the woman's life. In January 2019 new legislation was passed by the National Assembly to adopt a new Penal Code. The reform expanded the circumstances under which abortion is legal to include risk of health, rape and fetal impairments. After the President João Lourenço vetoed some provisions of the new Code and demanded tougher anti-corruption measures, the National Assembly approved the final version of the new Penal Code (Law 38/20) on 4 November 2020. The president signed the reform into law on 6 November 2020 along with the new Code of Criminal Procedure (Law 39/20) which also replaced a 1929 Portuguese code and was approved by the Assembly on 22 July 2020. The new Codes were published on the Official Gazette on 11 November 2020, thus entering into force 90 days later, on 9 February 2021.

== See also ==
- Maternal health in Angola
- Women's March for the Decriminalization of Abortion
