= Amália Maria Alexandre =

Angolan politician

Member of the National Assembly of Angola
- Incumbent
- Assumed office 28 September 2017

Personal details
- Party: MPLA

Amália Maria Alexandre is an Angolan politician for the MPLA and a member of the National Assembly of Angola. She is the coordinator of the monitoring group of the executive secretariat of the Angolan Women's Organization (WCO) for Cunene.
