= 5th National Assembly of Angola =

The 5th National Assembly of Angola was elected in the 2022 Angolan general election.

== Members ==
- Carolina Cerqueira - President of the National Assembly - MPLA
- Américo António Cuononoca - 1st Vice President - MPLA
- Arlete Leona Chimbinda - 2nd Vice President - UNITA
- Raul Augusto Lima - 3rd Vice President - MPLA
- Xavier Jaime Manuel - 4th Vice President - UNITA

Secretaries of the Board

- Manuel Lopes Moniz Dembo - 1st Secretary of the Board - MPLA
- Amélia Judith Ernesto - 2nd Secretary of the Board - UNITA
- Rosa Branca da Cunha Cardoso Albino - 3rd Secretary of the Board - MPLA
- Ernesto da Costa Kassongo - 4th Secretary of the Board - UNITA

In the Fifth Legislature, 2022/2027, the Deputies to the National Assembly had the following distribution of parliamentary seats:

- Parliamentary Group/MPLA - 124 Members of Parliament, 52 Men and 72 Women
- Parliamentary Group/UNITA - 90 Deputies, 76 Men and 14 Women
- Parliamentary Representation/ PRS - 2 Deputies
- Parliamentary Representation/ FNLA - 2 Deputies
- Parliamentary Representation/ PHA - 2 Deputies, 1 Woman and 1 Man.

President of the Parliamentary Groups

1. From 2022 to February 2024 - Virgílio de Fontes Pereira - MPLA
2. Joaquim António Carlos Dos Reis – MPLA
3. Liberty Marlin Dircéu Samuel Chiaka – UNITA

Parliamentary Representation

1. Benedito Daniel, President of the PRS
2. Nimi-A-Simbi, President of the FNLA
3. Florbela Malaquias, President of PHA

Ten Specialized Working Committees of the National Assembly were approved with the following names :

1st Committee — Committee on Constitutional and Legal Affairs;

2nd Committee — Committee on Defense, Security, Internal Order, and Former Members, Combatants and Veterans of the Homeland;

3rd Committee — Committee on Foreign Relations, International Cooperation and Angolan Communities Abroad;

4th Committee — Committee on State Administration and Local Government;

5th Committee — Committee on Economy and Finance;

6th Committee — Committee on Health, Education, Higher Education, Science and Technology;

7th Committee - Committee on Culture, Religious Affairs, Social Communication, Youth and Sports;

8th Committee — Committee on Family, Childhood and Social Action;

9th Committee — Committee on Mandates, Ethics and Parliamentary Decorum;

1st - Committee on Human Rights, Petitions, Complaints and Suggestions from Citizens

President of the Specialized Working Committees

1. Antonio Rodrigues Afonso Paulo
2. Ruth Adriano Mendes
3. Alcides Salaka Simões
4. Franco Meneses Marcolino Nhani
5. Aia-Eza Nacília Gomes da Silva Troso
6. Victor Mario Chicua Kajibanga
7. Conceição João Faria Paulo
8. Clarice Mukinda
9. Sergio Leonardo Vaz
10. Vigil of the Resurrection B. Adriano Tyova

Chairman of the Board of Directors

1. Suzana Augusto de Melo

President of the Women Parliamentarians Group

1. Teresa José Adelina da Silva Neto

== See also ==
- List of Angolans
