= Amélia Judith Ernesto =

Angolan politician

Amélia Judith Ernesto is an Angolan politician for UNITA and a member of the National Assembly of Angola.
