= Women's March for the Decriminalization of Abortion =

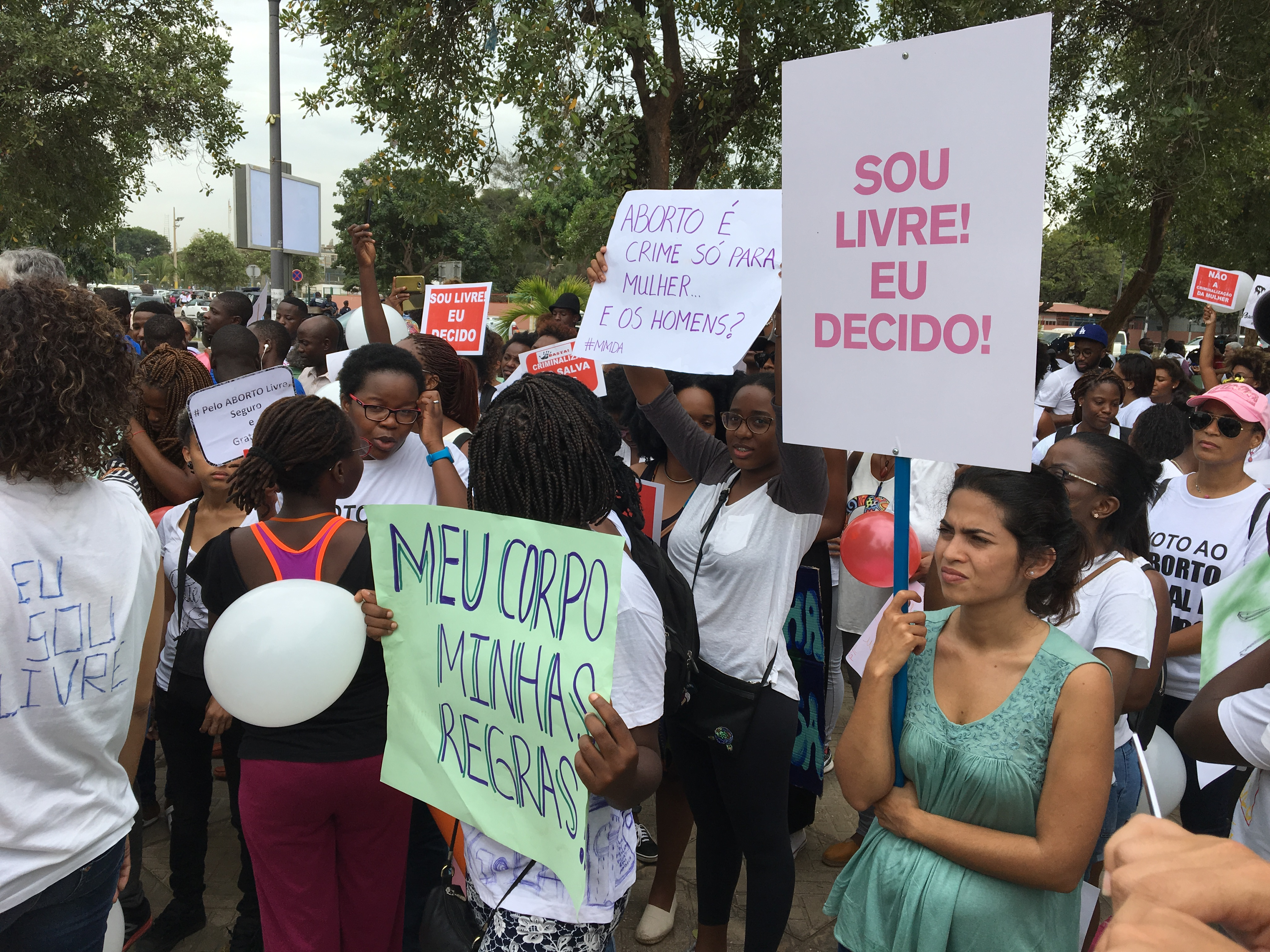
Women's March for the Decriminalization of Abortion

The Women's March for the Decriminalization of Abortion took place on March 18, 2017, in Luanda, Angola. The march was organized by a group of women from civil society, including several members of the Ondjango Feminista collective. The march began at 10:00 a.m. at the Santa Ana Cemetery, in homage to the women who died because of clandestine abortions (unsafe abortions), and ended at 2:00 p.m. at Largo das Heroínas.

== Context ==
The organizers of the march considered the approval of the proposal for a Penal Code that criminalized abortion to be unconstitutional. In this proposal, passed in the National Assembly on March 11, 2017, the previous exceptions for abortion were eliminated (unviability of the fetus, pregnancies that put the mother's life at risk, and pregnancies resulting from rape). The proposal aimed to establish a sentence of four to ten years for abortions.

The march was supported by prominent figures such as Isabel dos Santos, Ana Paula Godinho, Aline Frazão, and Mihaela Webba.

== See also ==
- Abortion in Angola
