= List of ship launches in 1823 =

The list of ship launches in 1823 includes a chronological list of some ships launched in 1823.

Date	Ship	Class	Builder	Location	Country	Notes
1 January	Bridgend	Brig		Bridgend	United Kingdom	For George Hurlow.
30 January	William Mab	Snow	Samuel Standidge-Walton	Hull	United Kingdom	For private owner.
16 February	La Cazelda	Corvette		Cartagena	Spain	For Spanish Navy.
22 February	Canada	Packet ship	Brown & Bell	Manhattan Island, New York	United States	For private owner.
26 February	Don Giovanni	Yacht		Gravesend	United Kingdom	For private owner.
27 February	Palinurus	Survey ship		Bombay Dockyard	India	For Bombay Marine.
11 March	Kingfisher	Cherokee-class brig-sloop		Woolwich Dockyard	United Kingdom	For Royal Navy.
13 March	Magnet	Cherokee-class brig-sloop		Woolwich Dockyard	United Kingdom	For Royal Navy.
17 March	Netley	Cutter		Plymouth	United Kingdom	For Board of Customs.
19 March	Britannia	Steamship		Dover	United Kingdom	For private owner.
1 April	Vénus	Vestale-class frigate		Lorient	France	For French Navy.
12 April	Fairy	Brig	W. and C. Boulton	Hull	United Kingdom	For private owner.
12 April	John & Mary	Full-rigged ship	Brodrick	Whitby	United Kingdom	For Thomas Marshall.
12 April	Magicienne	Armide-class frigate	Jean-Baptiste Hubert	Rochefort	France	For French Navy.
12 April	Prince Regent	Caledonia-class ship of the line		Chatham Dockyard	United Kingdom	For Royal Navy.
13 April	Bressane	Alsacienne-class gun-brig		Cherbourg	France	For French Navy.
13 April	Alsacienne	Alsacienne-class gun-brig		Cherbourg	France	For French Navy.
14 April	Tweed	Atholl-class corvette		Portsmouth Dockyard	United Kingdom	For Royal Navy.
22 April	Malouine	Alsacienne-class gun-brig		Lorient	France	For French Navy.
23 April	Lilloise	Alsacienne-class gun-brig		Lorient	France	For French Navy.
28 April	Philomel	Cherokee-class brig-sloop		Portsmouth Dockyard	United Kingdom	For Royal Navy.
April	Toulonnaise	Iris-class schooner		Toulon	France	For French Navy.
7 May	Predpriiatie	Sixth rate	A. A. Popov	Saint Petersburg	Russia	For Imperial Russian Navy.
10 May	Emerald Isle	Steamship	Mottershead & Heyes	Liverpool	United Kingdom	For St. George Steam Packet Company.
12 May	Royalist	Cherokee-class brig-sloop		Portsmouth Dockyard	United Kingdom	For Royal Navy.
22 May	Kastor	Provornyi-class frigate	B. F. Stoke	Saint Petersburg	Russia	For Imperial Russian Navy.
23 May	Prokhor	Selafail-class ship of the line	A. M. Kurochkin	Arkhangelsk	Russia	For Imperial Russian Navy.
May	Echo	Merchantman	John M. & William Gales	Sunderland	United Kingdom	For John M. & William Gales.
May	Vind Khund	Provornyi-class frigate	A. M. Kurochkin	Arkhangelsk	Russia	For Imperial Russian Navy.
8 June	Antilope	Gazelle-class schooner		Bayonne	France	For French Navy.
10 June	Algerine	Cherokee-class brig-sloop		Deptford Dockyard	United Kingdom	For Royal Navy.
21 June	The Glamorgan	Schooner	William Ruff	Cardiff	United Kingdom	For private owner.
25 June	Dauphinoise	Iris-class schooner		Bayonne	France	For French Navy.
25 June	Artésienne	Iris-class schooner		Bayonne	France	For French Navy.
25 June	Meteor	Hecla-class bomb vessel		Pembroke Dockyard	United Kingdom	For Royal Navy.
26 June	Norna	Merchantman	Morton	Leith	United Kingdom	For private owner.
26 June	Quentin Durward	Paddle steamer	Sime & Rankine	Leith	United Kingdom	For R. Ogilvie & G. Crichton.
10 July	Henry Bell	Steamship	Wilson & Co.	Liverpool	United Kingdom	For private owner.
12 July	Diana	Paddle steamer	Kyd & Co	Kidderpore	India	For British East India Company.
12 July	Mirnyi	Bodryi-class rowing frigate	I. V. Kurepanov	Saint Petersburg	Russia	For Imperial Russian Navy.
15 July	Soho	Steamship		Blackwall	United Kingdom	For London and Edinburgh Steam Packet Company.
19 July	Cicero	Brig	Thomas Barrick	Whitby	United Kingdom	For George Stephens.
23 July	Sir Francis Drake	Steamship		Plymouth	United Kingdom	For private owner.
25 July	Hamadryad	Modified Leda-class frigate		Pembroke Dockyard	United Kingdom	For Royal Navy.
25 July	Sirène	Vestale-class frigate	Garnier Saint-Maurice & Pestel	Toulon	France	For French Navy.
July	Mesange	Iris-class schooner		Toulon	France	For French Navy.
7 August	Deft	Schooner	Cordingley	Ipswich	United Kingdom	For private owner.
7 August	Lowther	Paddle steamer		Hull	United Kingdom	For private owner.
12 August	Tagus	Schooner	Jabez Bayley	Ipswich	United Kingdom	For private owner.
21 August	Algésiras	Bucentaure-class ship of the line		Lorient	France	For French Navy.
21 August	Mary	Sloop	William Bailey	Woodbridge	United Kingdom	For private owner.
21 August	Thames	Fifth rate		Chatham Dockyard	United Kingdom	For Royal Navy.
22 August	Lancaster	Southampton-class frigate	Edward Churchill	Plymouth Dockyard	United Kingdom	For Royal Navy.
August	Active	Sloop		Grimsby	United Kingdom	For John Todd & Co.
2 September	Pimen	Third rate	A. K. Kaverznev	Kherson	Russia	For Imperial Russian Navy.
6 September	Boode	West Indiaman	Mottershead & Heyes	Liverpool	United Kingdom	For Sandbach, Tinne & Co.
19 September	Lightning	Lightning-class paddle steamer		Deptford Dockyard	United Kingdom	For Royal Navy.
20 September	Sandwich	Brig	White	Cowes	United Kingdom	For Joseph Marryatt.
22 September	Elizabeth	Full-rigged ship	J. & R. Fisher	Liverpool	United Kingdom	For Messrs. C. Fletcher & Co.
22 September	Triton	Téméraire-class ship of the line		Rochefort	France	For French Navy.
24 September	Diana	Sloop	I. Y. Osminin	Sevastopol	Russia	For Imperial Russian Navy.
27 September	Lord Melville	Packet ship	R. Symons	Falmouth, Cornwall	United Kingdom	For Admiralty.
4 October	City of Dublin	Steamship	Dawson and Pearson	Liverpool	United Kingdom	For private owner.
7 October	Eclipse	Schooner		Newport	United Kingdom	For Messrs. Jones & Co.
10 October	Francis I	Steamboat	de Girard	Tischamend	Austrian Empire	For private owner.
18 October	Parmen	Third rate	I. S. Razumov	Nicholaieff	Russia	For Imperial Russian Navy.
21 October	Carnatic	Third rate	James Taylor	Portsmouth Dockyard	United Kingdom	For Royal Navy.
October	Alice	Sloop		"Low Lights"	United Kingdom	For private owner.
1 November	Zephyr	Cherokee-class brig-sloop		Pembroke Dockyard	United Kingdom	For Royal Navy.
12 November	Helen	Brig	Easton	Hereford	United Kingdom	For private owner.
18 November	John Catto	Brig	Adamson	Aberdeen	United Kingdom	For private owner.
19 November	Grocer	Sloop	Gatenby	Selby	United Kingdom	For private owner.
20 November	Rainbow	Sixth rate		Chatham Dockyard	United Kingdom	For Royal Navy.
24 November	Aladdin	Steamship	Simmons	Little Falmouth	United Kingdom	For private owner.
4 December	The Mary of London	Schooner	Jabez Bayley	Ipswich	United Kingdom	For private owner.
Unknown date	Auspicious	Merchantman		Sunderland	United Kingdom	For E. B. Ord & Co.
Unknown date	Bellona	Fourth rate		Dunkirk	France	For Royal Netherlands Navy.
Unknown date	Catherine	Brig	Good & Son	Hyther	United Kingdom	For private owner.
Unknown date	Charles Henry	Merchantman	L. Crown	Sunderland	United Kingdom	For Lees & Co.
Unknown date	Columbine	Barque		Sunderland	United Kingdom	For private owner.
Unknown date	Dandy	Paddle steamer	John Bowlt	Newcastle upon Tyne	United Kingdom	For private owner.
Unknown date	Decoy	Full-rigged ship			United States	For United States Navy.
Unknown date	Diadem	Merchantman	Philip Laing	Sunderland	United Kingdom	For Mr. Scaling.
Unknown date	Diamond	Full-rigged ship		New York	United States	For private owner.
Unknown date	Effort	Snow		Sunderland	United Kingdom	For private owner.
Unknown date	Henry	Snow	John M. & William Gales	Sunderland	United Kingdom	For Thomas Young & others.
Unknown date	Henry Seton	Merchantman	Philip Laing	Sunderland	United Kingdom	For private owner.
Unknown date	Hope	Snow		Sunderland	United Kingdom	For J. Ormiston.
Unknown date	Hylton	Brig	John M & William Gales	Sunderland	United Kingdom	For Gales & Co.
Unknown date	Isabella	Brig		Redbridge	United Kingdom	For Mr. Maughan.
Unknown date	Maria	Brigantine		Dublin	United Kingdom	For private owner.
Unknown date	New York Packet	Barque		Bristol	United Kingdom	For private owner.
Unknown date	Paragon	Merchantman		Sunderland	United Kingdom	For private owner.
Unknown date	Pero	Brig	J. Hall	Sunderland	United Kingdom	For W. Rutter.
Unknown date	Pomona	Schooner	Earton	Hereford	United Kingdom	For private owner.
Unknown date	Plutus	Merchantman	Philip Laing	Sunderland	United Kingdom	For private owner.
Unknown date	Prince Frederick	Steamship		Thorne	United Kingdom	For private owner.
Unknown date	Rebecca	Brig	J. Storey	Sunderland	United Kingdom	For Storey & Co.
Unknown date	Research	Survey ship	J. Scott & Co	Calcutta	India	For British East India Company.
Unknown date	Russell	Snow	John M. & William Gales	Sunderland	United Kingdom	For R. Scurfield.
Unknown date	Sons of the Wear	Merchantman	T. Elliot	Sunderland	United Kingdom	For private owner.
Unknown date	Sprightly	Paddle tug	Wigram & Green	Blackwall	United Kingdom	For Royal Navy.
Unknown date	Starling	Snow		Monkwearmouth	United Kingdom	For private owner.
Unknown date	Thorny Close	Snow	J. Watson	Sunderland	United Kingdom	For private owner.
Unknown date	Unity	Snow	Oswald Partis	Sunderland	United Kingdom	For Mr. Havelock.
Unknown date	Vesper	Merchantman	Philip Laing	Sunderland	United Kingdom	For Philip Laing.
Unknown date	White	Snow	John M. & William Gales	Sunderland	United Kingdom	For John Robinson.
Unknown date	XL	Snow	John M. & William Gales	Sunderland	United Kingdom	For John M. & William Gales.
Unknown date	Zeemeeuw	Full-rigged ship			Netherlands	For Royal Netherlands Navy.
