= Constitution of Angola =

Supreme law of Angola

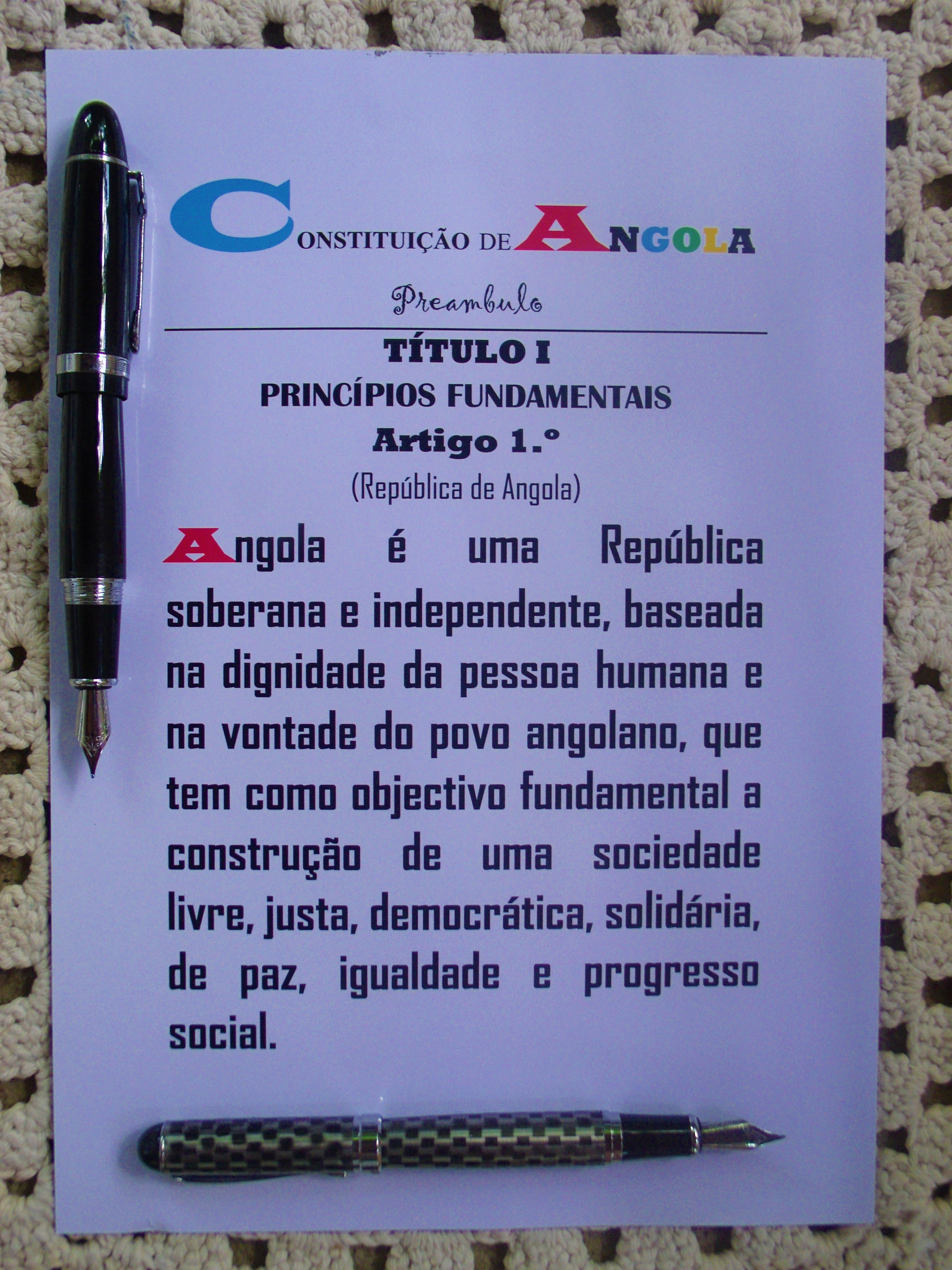
- Article 1 of the Constitution
- Created: Original 1975, reformed 1980, 1992, 2010
- Ratified: 2010
- Author: National Assembly of Angola
- Signatories: Constituent Assembly
- Purpose: National constitution

Full text
- Constitution of Angola at Wikisource

Since the Angolan War of Independence from Portugal in 1975, Angola has had three constitutions. The first came into force in 1975 as an "interim" measure; the second was approved in a 1992 referendum, and the third one was instituted in 2010.

Angola was a colony of Portugal for more than 400 years, beginning the 15th century. Three principal parties, MPLA, National Front for the Liberation of Angola (FNLA) and the National Union for Total Independence of Angola (UNITA), fought for independence. After many years of conflict that weakened all of the insurgent parties, Angola gained independence on 11 November 1975, after the Carnation Revolution overthrew the Marcelo Caetano regime in Portugal. A fight for dominance broke out immediately between the three nationalist movements, resulting in a civil war soon after independence. The civil war continued with UNITA fighting against the ruling MPLA. Both parties received support and backing from other countries.

Constitutional revisions in 1976 and 1980 more clearly established a revolutionary socialist, one-party state as a national goal.

In 1992, the 1975 constitution was completely rewritten to allow a multiparty democratic republic, in the form of a presidential system, starting with multiparty elections and direct election of the president.

The 2010 amendment of the constitution named the president of Angola as head of state, head of the executive branch and commander-in-chief of the Angolan armed forces. The new constitution abolished direct election of the president; under its provisions, the person heading the list of candidates of the majority party in the assembly automatically becomes president, and the second person on the list, vice-president. This constitution, still in effect, limits the president to two five-year terms.

== Background ==
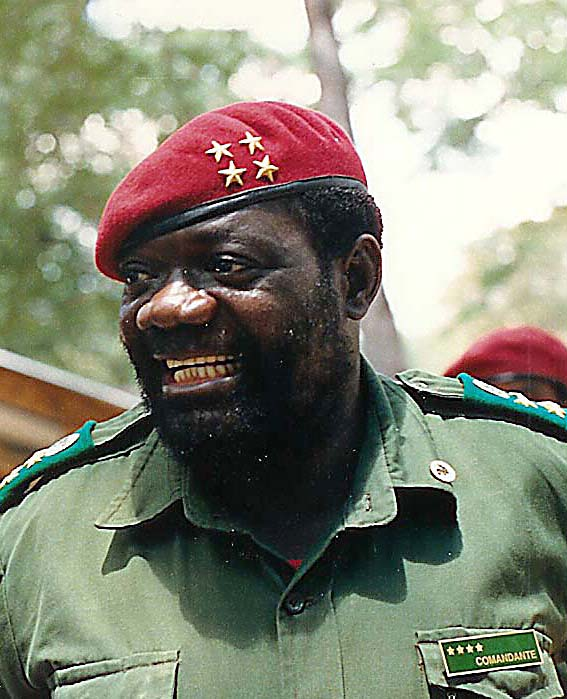
Jonas Savimbi, the leader of UNITA, the major opposition party

Angola was a colony of Portugal for more than 400 years from the 15th century. Demands for independence picked up momentum during the early 1950s. The principal protagonists included the MPLA, founded in 1956, the National Front for the Liberation of Angola (FNLA), which appeared in 1961, and the UNITA, founded in 1966. After many years of conflict that weakened all of the insurgent parties, Angola gained independence on 11 November 1975, after the Carnation Revolution in Portugal overthrew the Portuguese regime headed by Marcelo Caetano.

A fight for dominance broke out immediately between the three nationalist movements. The events prompted a mass exodus of Portuguese citizens, creating up to 300,000 destitute Portuguese refugees—the retornados. The new Portuguese government attempted to mediate an understanding between the three competing movements. They initially agreed to terms, but the agreement dissolved mere days later. This failure to agree, which resulted in a devastating civil war that lasted several decades, claimed millions of lives and producing many refugees before it ended in 2002.

During the civil war, the MPLA gained control of Luanda—the capital—and much of the rest of the country. With the support of the United States, Zaire and South Africa intervened militarily in favour of the FNLA and UNITA, with the intention of taking Luanda before the declaration of independence. In response, Cuba intervened in favour of the MPLA, and the country became a flash point for the Cold War. With Cuban support, the MPLA held Luanda and declared independence on 11 November 1975, with Agostinho Neto becoming the first president, although the civil war continued.

== 1975 constitution ==
Independent Angola's first constitution was a communist state constitution dedicated the new republic to eliminating the vestiges of Portuguese colonialism. The constitution provided numerous guarantees of individual freedom and prohibited discrimination based on color, race, ethnic identity, sex, place of birth, religion, level of education, and economic or social status. The constitution also promised freedom of expression and assembly.

Constitutional revisions in 1976 and 1980 more clearly established a revolutionary socialist, one-party state the national goal. As revised, the constitution vested sovereignty in the Angolan people, guaranteed through the representation of the party, and promised to implement "people's power." It also emphasized the preeminence of the People's Movement for the Liberation of Angola (MPLA) as a policy-making body and made the government subordinate to it, responsible for implementing party policy. Economic development was to be founded on socialist models of cooperative ownership.

Other constitutional guarantees included health care, access to education, and state assistance in childhood, motherhood, disability, and old age. In return for these sweeping guarantees, each individual was responsible for participating in the nation's military defense, voting in official elections, serving in public office if appointed or elected, working—considered a duty—and generally aiding in the socialist transformation.

Despite its strong socialist tone, the constitution guaranteed the protection of private property and private business activity within limits set by the state. National economic goals were to develop agriculture and industry, establish just social relations in all sectors of production, foster the growth of the public sector and cooperatives, and implement a system of graduated direct taxation. Social goals included combating illiteracy, promoting the development of education and a national culture, and enforcing strict separation of church and state, with official respect for all religions.

The constitution also outlined Angola's defense policy, which explicitly prohibited foreign military bases on Angolan soil or affiliation with any foreign military organization. It institutionalized the People's Armed Forces for the Liberation of Angola (FAPLA) as the nation's army and assigned it responsibility for defense and national reconstruction. Military conscription applied to both men and women over the age of eighteen.

== 1992 constitution ==
José Eduardo dos Santos won the 1980 election and 1986 election and became the first elected president of the country. The civil war continued, with UNITA still fighting the MPLA, and both parties still receiving international support. There was a ceasefire agreement in 1989 with the leader of UNITA, Jonas Savimbi, but it collapsed soon afterwards. As a part of its peace efforts, the MPLA amended its platform of Marxism-Leninism and shifted its policies to a more socialist than communist worldview. In May 1991, dos Santos and UNITA's Savimbi signed a multiparty democracy agreement in Lisbon.

In 1992 the 1975 constitution was completely rewritten, and amended on March 6, 1991, and August 26, 1992, to allow a multi-party democratic republic, in the form of a presidential system, to start with multiparty elections and direct election of the president.

== 2010 constitution ==
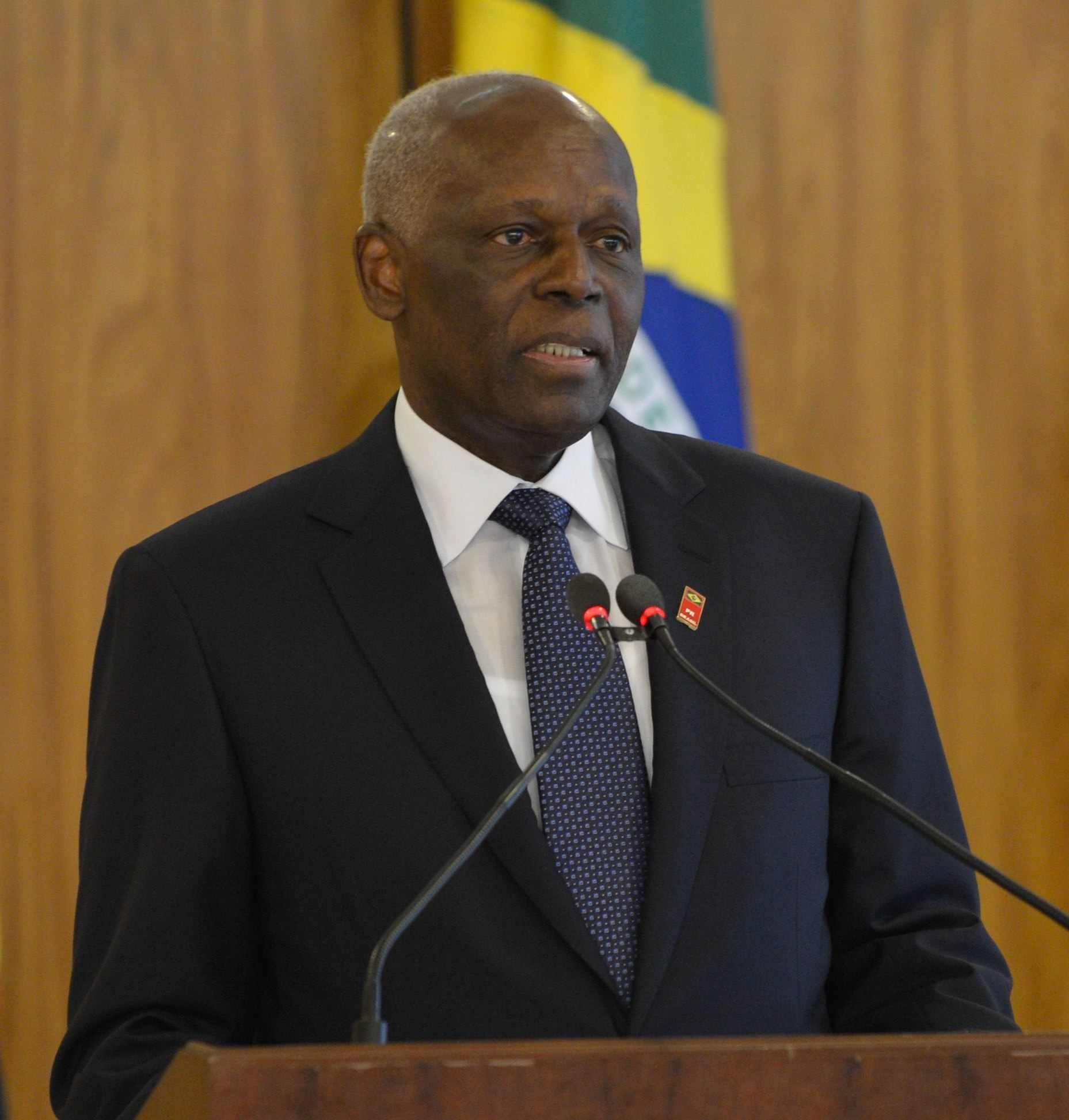
José Eduardo dos Santos, President of Angola from 1979 to 2017

On 21 January 2010 the National Assembly of Angola approved a new constitution to replace the interim constitution that had been in effect since independence in 1975. The Assembly approved this constitution in its entirety, by a 186–0 vote. Two assembly members abstained. The new constitution was drafted by a committee of 60 parliamentarians, advised by 19 experts and a public consultation, and contained 244 articles.

The vote in the national assembly was boycotted by the opposition (UNITA) party, which claimed that the constitutional process had been flawed and undermined democracy. The ruling party, MPLA, had an 81% majority on the constitution committee, equal to their parliamentary majority. The constitution needed the approval of President José Eduardo dos Santos and of the Constitutional Court but both steps were seen as formalities.

It named the president of Angola as head of state, head of the executive branch and commander-in-chief of the Angolan armed forces. The new constitution abolished direct election of the president; the person heading the list of candidates of the majority party in the assembly automatically becomes president, and the second in the list, vice-president. The constitution limits the president to two five-year terms, but the 30-year term already served by dos Santos does not count and under the constitution his term would start from the next parliamentary elections in 2012, and allow him to remain president until 2022. The post of Prime Minister would be abolished, whose role would be taken over by the vice-president. The Assembly retains the right to remove the president from office but such an action must be approved by the Supreme Court. The vice president and the members of the Supreme Court are presidential nominees under the Constitution.

The constitution clarified the ambiguous land rights that existed in Angola, stating that all land is owned by the state, which can decide who is entitled to use it, and that the state must only provide land rights to Angolan nationals or to companies registered in Angola.

The constitution gives the president the power to appoint judges to the Constitutional and Supreme courts and also to appoint the head of the Court of Audits, which is the body responsible for reviewing public expenditure. The document also maintains the present status of Cabinda, an exclave of Angola surrounded by the Democratic Republic of Congo, as a part of Angola. Oil-rich Cabinda has been claimed by Front for the Liberation of the Enclave of Cabinda (FLEC) separatists. The new constitution retains the current national flag (which is similar to the flag used by the MPLA during the Angolan Civil War). The constitution guarantees freedom of religion and of the press. The death penalty remains banned.

== Reception ==
The new constitution of 2010 was hailed as "a day of victory and happiness for the people of Angola" by Fernando da Piedade Dias dos Santos, then president of the National Assembly, and Bornito de Sousa, who chaired the constitutional commission, said that the charter was "a reflection of equality, of good sense, and true representation of the electorate". However, "The ruling MPLA says the constitution will increase democracy, but by abolishing the presidential ballot and concentrating all the power on the president it will do exactly the opposite," Fernando Macedo, a political analyst in Luanda, said after the vote. UNITA member Raul Danda stated that the constitution was "a complete fraud" and that his party was wearing black "because it's like going to the graveyard to bury democracy". UNITA's parliamentary leader, Alda Juliana Paulo Sachiambo, also spoke out against the new constitution saying that it gave "excessive executive power" to dos Santos. The head of Katiava Bwila University, political scientist Paulo de Carvalho, spoke out against UNITA's concerns in defense of the Constitution. He said that the party-list system is used in democracies in Europe, Asia and South Africa, and that the new document contains many clauses that were in the old constitution.

The original vote on the constitution had been expected in March but was then moved to January. There was speculation that this delay was intended to avoid public debate on the matter by holding the vote at the same time that Angola hosts the 2010 African Cup of Nations. Dos Santos had said that as soon as the constitution was passed he would reduce the size of the government and reduce the opportunities for officials to engage in corrupt activities. In 2010, Transparency International ranked Angola the 18th most corrupt country.
