= Margarida Rosa da Silva Izata =

Angolan ambassador to the United Nations (born 1958)

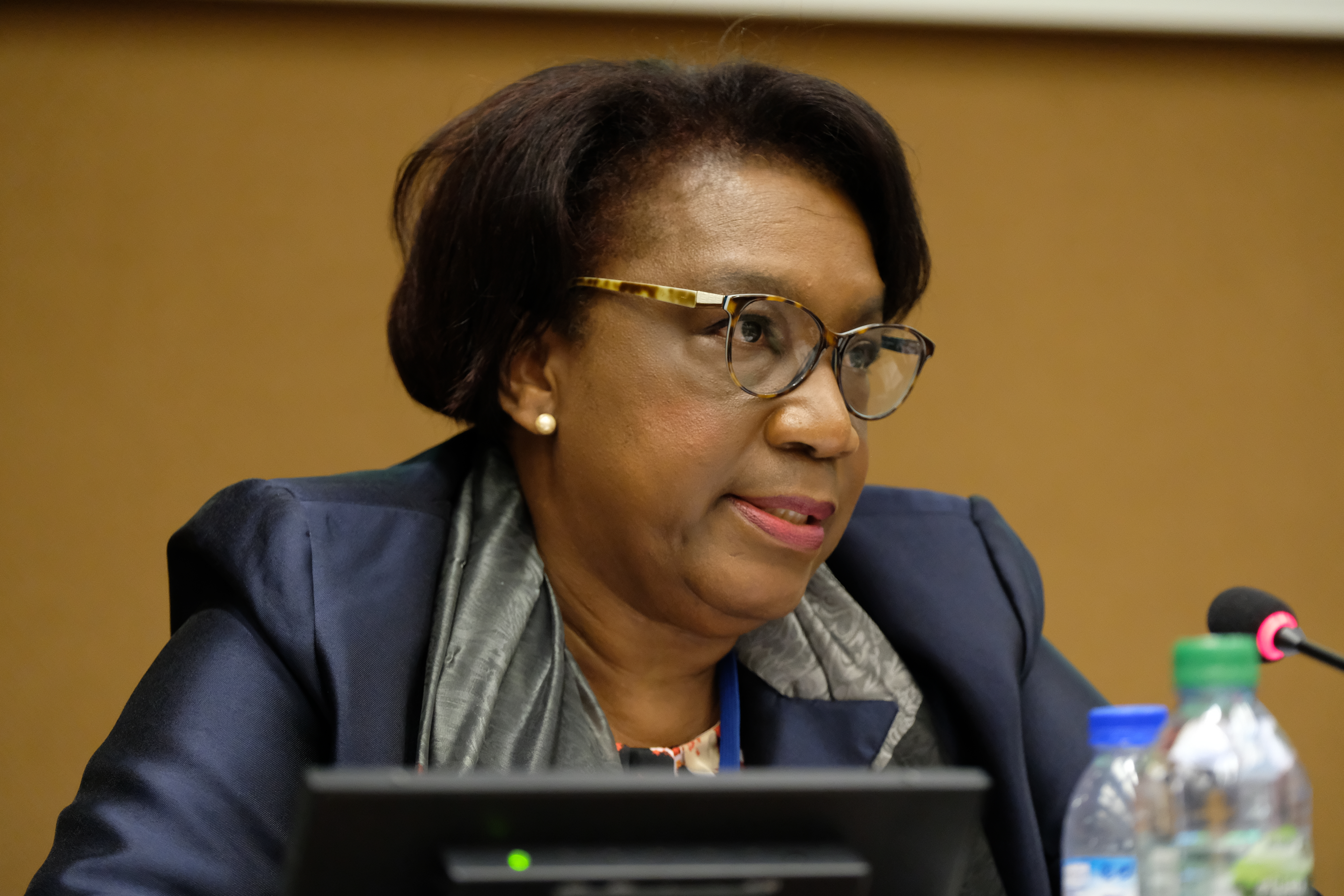
- Born: July 10, 1958 (age 67)
- Occupation: Ambassador
- Known for: UN representative for Angola
- Predecessor: Apolinário Jorge Correia
- Children: 3

Margarida Rosa da Silva Izata (born July 10, 1958) is an Angolan ambassador to the United Nations.

== Life ==
She was born in 1958 and studied economics in Bucharest followed by a 2004 master's degree at Ignatius-Sofia University in the prevention and resolution of conflict.

She was appointed as an ambassador by President João Lourenço who sacked nine of his country's ambassadors among them Apolinário Jorge Correia who had been the UN ambassador.

She presented her official documents in Geneva to identify herself as Angola's ambassador to the United Nations in May 2018. Her office is in Geneva. In the same month Angola was asked to present its progress in achieving the Convention on the Rights of the Child. Ruth Madalena Mixinge presented the Angolan's report and da Silva Izata attended to answer questions. Angola's progress was noted but children were still being exploited as diamond mine workers.

== Personal ==
In 2018 she was married and she and her husband have had three children.
