= Kundi Paihama =

Angolan politician (1944–2020)

Member of Parliament
- In office 2018–2020

Provincial Commissioner of Cunene
- In office 1976–1979
- Preceded by: Position established
- Succeeded by: Capt Ary da Costa

Minister of State Security
- In office 1980–1981
- Preceded by: Lourenço Ferreira Diandengue
- Succeeded by: J.M. Paulo Dino Matross

Provincial Commissioner of Benguela
- In office 1981–1986
- Preceded by: J.M. Paulo Dino Matross
- Succeeded by: João Lourenço

Minister of State for Inspection and State Control
- In office 1986–1991
- Preceded by: n/a
- Succeeded by: n/a

Governor of Luanda
- In office 1991–1993
- Preceded by: Luís Gonzaga Wawuty
- Succeeded by: Rui Óscar de Carvalho

Governor of Huila
- In office 1995–1999
- Preceded by: Dumilde Rangel
- Succeeded by: Ramos da Cruz

Minister of Defense
- In office 2002–2010
- Preceded by: Gen. Pedro Sebastião
- Succeeded by: Cândido Van-Dúnem

Minister of Anti-Colonial Fighters and War Veterans
- In office 2012–2014
- Preceded by: Pedro J. Van-Dúnem
- Succeeded by: Cândido Van-Dúnem

Governor of Huambo
- In office 2014–2016
- Preceded by: João B. Kussumua
- Succeeded by: António Didalelwa

Governor of Cunene
- In office 2016–2018
- Preceded by: António Didalelwa
- Succeeded by: Vigílio Tyova

Personal details
- Born: Kundi Paihama; 9 December 1944 Quipungo, Huíla, Overseas Province of Angola, Portugal
- Died: 24 July 2020 (aged 75) Luanda
- Political party: MPLA

Kundi Paihama (9 December 1944 – 24 July 2020) was an Angolan politician who served as Angola's Minister of Defense from 2002 to 2010. He served subsequently as Minister for War Veterans.

Paihama was the 18th candidate on the national list of the People's Movement for the Liberation of Angola (MPLA) in the September 2008 parliamentary election. He won a seat in this election, in which the MPLA won an overwhelming majority in the National Assembly.

Kundi Paihama owned 33.15% of the shares of the Banco Angolano de Negócios e Comércio.

Paihama died in a private hospital in Luanda.

Paihama was sometimes a controversial figure in Angola's ruling party, the MPLA, with a few famous quotes including: "Não percam tempo a escutar as mensagens de promessas de certos políticos, trabalhem para ser ricos" (do not waste your time listening to the promises of certain politicians, work hard and get rich" and “Durmo bem, como bem e o que restar no meu prato dou aos meus cães e não aos pobres” (I sleep and eat well, my leftovers go to my dogs, not the destitute).

Political offices
Preceded by Position established	Provincial Commissioner of Cunene; 1976–1979	Succeeded by Capt Ary da Costa
Preceded by Lourenço José Ferreira Diandengue	Minister of State Security; 1980–1981	Succeeded by Julião Mateus Paulo Dino Matross
Preceded by Julião Mateus Paulo Dino Matross	Provincial Commissioner of Benguela; 1981–1986	Succeeded by João Lourenço
Preceded by	Minister of State for Inspection and State Control; 1986–1991	Succeeded by
Preceded by Luís Gonzaga Wawuty	Governor of Luanda; 1991–1993	Succeeded by Rui Óscar de Carvalho
Preceded by Dumilde das Chagas Rangel	Governor of Huila; 1995–1999	Succeeded by Francisco José Ramos da Cruz
Preceded by Gen. Pedro Sebastião	Minister of Defense; 2002–2010	Succeeded by Cândido P. dos Santos Van-Dúnem
Preceded by Pedro José Van-Dúnem	Minister of Anti-Colonial Fighters and War Veterans; 2012–2014	Succeeded by Cândido P. dos Santos Van-Dúnem
Preceded by Fernando Faustino Muteka	Governor of Huambo; 2014–2016	Succeeded by João Baptista Kussumua
Preceded by António Didalelwa	Governor of Cunene; 2016–2018	Succeeded by Vigílio da R.B. Adriano Tyova
