= Anabela Caiovo Gunga =

Angolan politician

Anabela Caiovo Gunga is an Angolan politician for the MPLA and a member of the National Assembly of Angola.
