= Alicerces Paulo Bartolomeu =

Angolan politician

Member of the National Assembly of Angola
- Incumbent
- Assumed office 28 September 2017

Personal details
- Party: UNITA

Alicerces Paulo Bartolomeu, also known as Ali Mango (born 10 February 1982), is an Angolan politician for UNITA and a member of the National Assembly of Angola. He is the secretary general of Juventude Revolucionária de Angola (JURA).
