= André Gaspar Mendes de Carvalho =

Angolan politician

André Gaspar Mendes de Carvalho is an Angolan politician for CASA-CE and a member of the National Assembly of Angola.
