= Adérito Jaime Fernandes Kandambo =

Angolan politician

Adérito Jaime Fernandes Kandambo is an Angolan politician for UNITA and a member of the National Assembly of Angola.
