= Angélica Nené Curita Ihungo =

Angolan politician

Angélica Nené Curita Ihungo is an Angolan politician for the MPLA and a member of the National Assembly of Angola.
