= Amilcar Campos Colela =

Angolan politician

Amilcar Campos Colela is an Angolan politician for UNITA and a member of the National Assembly of Angola.
