= Dendy (disambiguation) =

Dendy is a series of home video game consoles.

Dendy may also refer to:

== People ==
- Dendy (surname)
- Dendy Easton (born 1950), British fine art consultant
- Dendy Lowa (born 1992), Malaysian footballer
- C. F. Dendy Marshall (1872–1945), English railway historian
- Dendy Sulistyawan (born 1996), Indonesian footballer
- Dendy Young (1907-1998), Rhodesia and Botswanan lawyer

== Other uses ==
- Dendy, an OK K.O.! Let's Be Heroes character
- Dendy Awards for Australian Short Films, awarded at the Sydney Film Festival
- Dendy Cinemas, an Australian cinema chain
- Dendy Theatre, an historic cinema in Brighton, Victoria, Australia

== See also ==
- Dandy (disambiguation)
