= Pedro Agostinho de Neri =

Angolan politician

Tete António

Secretary-General of the National Assembly of Angola
- Incumbent
- Assumed office November 2017

Personal details
- Born: 6 August 1963 (age 62) Cabinda, Angola

Pedro Agostinho de Neri (born 6 August 1963 in Cabinda) is an Angolan politician, and current secretary-general of the National Assembly of Angola.
