= Américo António Cuononoca =

Angolan politician

Américo António Cuononoca is an Angolan anthropologist, and a politician for UNITA. He is a member of the National Assembly of Angola.
