= Nkem Nwankwo =

Nigerian writer

- Born: 12 June 1936; Anambra State, Nigeria
- Died: 12 June 2001 (aged 65); Tennessee, United States
- Education: University College, Ibadan; Indiana University
- Occupation: Writer

Nkem Nwankwo // (12 June 1936 – 12 June 2001) was a Nigerian novelist and poet.

== Biography ==
Born in Nawfia-Awka, a village near the Igbo city of Onitsha in Anambra State, southeastern Nigeria, Nwankwo attended University College in Ibadan (the capital city of Oyo State, southwest Nigeria), gaining a BA degree in 1962. After graduating, he took a teaching job at Ibadan Grammar School, before going on to write for magazines, including Drum, and working for the Nigerian Broadcasting Corporation.

He wrote several stories for children that were published in 1963 such as Tales Out of School. He then wrote More Tales out of School in 1965.

Writer of short stories and poems, Nwankwo gained significant attention with his first novel Danda (1964), which was made into a widely performed musical that was entered in the 1966 World Festival of Negro Arts in Dakar, Senegal. During the Nigerian Civil War Nwankwo worked on Biafra's Arts Council. In 1968, in collaboration with Samuel X. Ifekjika, he wrote Biafra: The Making of a Nation. After the civil war, he returned to Lagos and worked on the national newspaper, the Daily Times. His subsequent works included the satire My Mercedes Is Bigger than Yours.

During the 1970s, Nwankwo earned a Master's and Ph.D. at Indiana University. He also wrote about corruption in Nigeria. He spent the latter part of his life in the United States and taught at Michigan State University and Tennessee State University.

He died in his sleep in Tennessee, from complications from a heart imbalance that he had been battling for some years.

== Books ==
- The Scapegoat — 1984 (Enugu: Fourth Dimension Publishers)
- My Mercedes Is Bigger than Yours — 1975
- Danda - 1963 (Lagos: African Universities Press; London: Deutsch, 1964)
- Tales Out of School (short stories; 1963)

== Short stories ==
- The Gambler, in: Black Orpheus no. 9
- His Mother, in: Nigeria Magazine no. 80, March 1964
- The Man Who Lost in: Nigeria Magazine no. 84, March 1965

== Other ==
- Sex Has Been Good To Me (reprint of essays), 2004
- Shadow of the Masquerade (autobiography), Nashville, TN: Niger House Publications 1994, pp. 58–61
- A Song for Fela & Other Poems. Nashville, TN: Nigerhouse, 1993
- Theatre reviews in: Nigeria Magazine no. 72, March 1962
