= My Mercedes Is Bigger than Yours =

1975 novel by Nkem Nwankwo

My Mercedes Is Bigger than Yours is a 1975 novel by Nigerian writer Nkem Nwankwo. It was published among the influential African Writers Series.
