= Bornito de Sousa =

Angolan politician

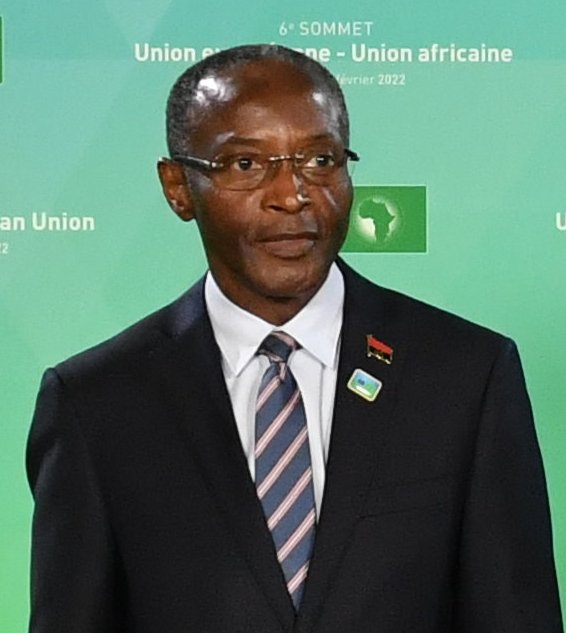
- Sousa in 2022

3rd Vice President of Angola
- In office 26 September 2017 – 14 September 2022
- President: João Lourenço
- Preceded by: Manuel Vicente
- Succeeded by: Esperança da Costa

Minister of Territory Administration
- In office 2 February 2010 – 24 July 2017
- President: José Eduardo dos Santos
- Preceded by: Virgílio de Fontes Pereira
- Succeeded by: Adão de Almeida

Personal details
- Born: 23 July 1953 (age 72) Quéssua, Malanje Province, Portuguese Angola
- Party: MPLA
- Spouse: Maria José Rodrigues Ferreira Diogo
- Occupation: Teacher, politician

Bornito de Sousa Baltazar Diogo (Note: European Portuguese pronunciation: [buɾˈnitu dɨ ˈsowzɐ baltɐˈzaɾ ˈdjoɡu].) (born 23 July 1953) is an Angolan politician who was the third vice president of Angola, from 2017 to 2022. He was the vice presidential candidate for the MPLA in the 2017 Angolan general election, running alongside João Lourenço and a member of the Constituent Assembly since 2010. He was officially sworn in as vice president on 26 September 2017.

== Early life and education ==
De Sousa was born in Quéssua, Malanje Province, Portuguese Angola. His father, Job Baltazar Diogo, was a primary school teacher, Quimbundo-Portuguese translator and once imprisoned by the Portuguese security agency, PIDE-DGS. His mother, Catarina Manuel Simão Bento "Katika", was a housewife.

He studied at the "Amor e Alegria" Primary School, at Quéssua Methodist Mission in Malanje and the United Methodist Church School in Luanda. He also attended the Liceu Nacional Salvador Correia de Sá e Benevides in Luanda. He obtained a degree in law from Agostinho Neto University and a science degree from Escola Superior do Partido.

== Political career ==
He started as a MPLA militant in Luanda (Marçal district) at the age of 16, in 1969, influenced by the events happening in neighbouring Congo, the arrest of his father, Job Baltazar Diogo, and his maternal uncle, Dr. Luís Micolo. He was imprisoned at St Paul prison in Luanda and São Nicolau (present-day Cape Verde) by the PIDE from January 1971 to May 1974. He was released in May 1974 after the 25 April Revolution, together with his brother, General Baltazar Diogo Cristóvão. He started his career by serving as the first National Secretary of the JMPLA. In 1976, he became the political commissar of the Angolan Armed Forces.

He was the president of the Constitutional Commission of the National Assembly, that was responsible for drafting the 2010 Angolan constitution. He was also the president of the MPLA Parliamentary Group until February 2010, when he was named Minister of Territorial Administration on 2 February 2010, and was reappointed to the office on 1 October 2012, after the 2012 elections.

=== Spending controversy ===
De Sousa was heavily criticised in Angola when his daughter, Naulila Diogo, spent $200,000 on dresses on the American reality show Say Yes to the Dress in 2015, more than any other bride had ever spent at the New York clothing store in the show. He responded with Facebook posts that mocked popular demands for his resignation over the unaccounted funds. De Sousa and his daughter responded with a libel lawsuit in Portugal against British writer Oliver Bullough for the criticism covered in his 2018 book Moneyland: Why Thieves and Crooks Now Rule the World. They also brought a criminal defamation case against Portuguese activist Paulo de Morais who publicly denounced de Sousa for lavishly spending large sums of money while Angola remained impoverished, but the case was dismissed in November 2022.

== Personal life ==
He was married to Maria José Rodrigues Ferreira Diogo. and has 4 daughters: Nhenze Mpasi Diogo Mendes, Njolela Chili Diogo, Djamila do Carmo Diogo and Naulila Katika Diogo Graça.

== Notes ==
Political offices
Preceded by Virgílio Ferreira de Fontes Pereira	Minister of Territory Administration; 2010–2017	Succeeded by Adão Francisco Correia de Almeida
Preceded by Manuel Vicente	Vice President of Angola; 2017–2022	Succeeded by Esperança da Costa
