= Tonda =

Tonda may refer to:

== People ==
- Tonda (name)

== Places ==
- Tonda Station, Osaka Prefecture, Japan
- Tonda Wildlife Management Area, Papua New Guinea
- Tonda (parish), a civil parish in the municipality of Tondela, Portugal
- Tonda, a mountain of the Iberian System in Spain

== Other uses ==
- Tonda (orangutan), a captive orangutan of the United States
- Tonda languages, a language group of New Guinea

== See also ==
- Tanda (disambiguation)
- Tondo (disambiguation)
- Tonka (disambiguation)
- Tonna (disambiguation)
