= Esperança da Costa =

Vice President of Angola since 2022

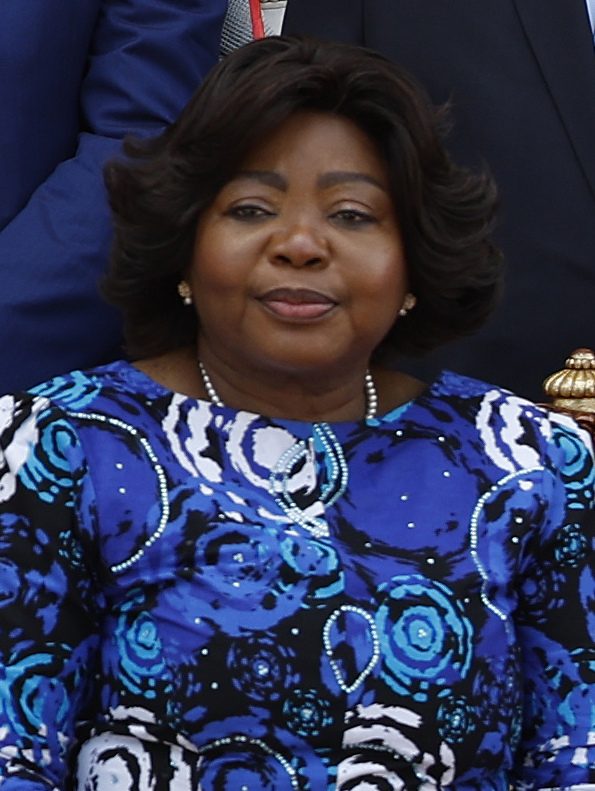
- da Costa in 2024

4th Vice President of Angola
- Incumbent
- Assumed office 15 September 2022
- President: João Lourenço
- Preceded by: Bornito de Sousa

Personal details
- Born: 3 May 1961 (age 65) Luanda, Angola
- Party: MPLA
- Education: Agostinho Neto University; Technical University of Lisbon
- Occupation: Politician; biologist; professor

Esperança Maria Eduardo Francisco da Costa (born 3 May 1961) is an Angolan biologist, university researcher-teacher and politician who is currently serving as the fourth vice president of Angola since 15 September 2022.

She was the deputy head of the Popular Movement for the Liberation of Angola (MPLA) party for the 2022 Angolan general elections. With the party's victory, she became Vice President of Angola on 15 September 2022.

== Biography ==
Esperança da Costa was born in Luanda, Angola, on 3 May 1961. In her youth, during the country's decolonization process, she was part of the Youth Movement of the Popular Movement for the Liberation of Angola (JMPLA) and the Organization of Angolan Women (OMA).

=== Scientific career ===
She studied biology at Agostinho Neto University (UAN), graduating in 1985. Between 1983 and 1984, she specialized at the Botany Center of the Tropical Scientific Research Institute in Lisbon, Portugal.

When she returned to Luanda, she was appointed assistant in plant biology at Agostinho Neto University (UAN), becoming head of the biology department in 1986. Between 1986 and 1990, she was responsible for the development of the Luanda Herbarium.

In 1990, she began her master's degree in plant productivity at the Technical University of Lisbon, followed, in 1992, to a doctorate in phytoecology at the same university, completed in 1997.

Upon returning to Angola, she was readmitted as a professor at Agostinho Neto University, becoming director of the Luanda Herbarium and assistant professor of plant biology.

She then served as vice-director of Scientific Affairs and, from 2002, vice-rector for University Expansion at UAN until 2007. Between 2007 and 2010, she was the National Director of the Expansion of Higher Education at the Ministry of Higher Education, supervising the national construction of campuses and new higher education institutions. She acted as director of the UAN Botany Center between 2010 and 2020.

=== Political career ===
She was elected to the Central Committee of the Popular Movement for the Liberation of Angola (MPLA) in 2019, being appointed by President João Lourenço as Secretary of State of Fishing in 2020.

== Vice President of Angola (2022-present) ==
She contested and won the 2022 Angolan general elections as the running mate of João Lourenço. She assumed office as Vice President of Angola on 15 September 2022.
