= Dandy (nickname) =

Dandy is a nickname which may refer to:

- Johnny Dolan (1849 or 1850–1876), New York City murderer and reputed gang leader
- Dandy Livingstone (born 1943), Jamaican reggae artist
- Alfred Lowth (1817–1907), English cricketer
- Jim "Dandy" Mangrum (born 1948), lead singer of the American Southern rock band Black Oak Arkansas
- David Nicholls (racehorse trainer) (1956–2017), British jockey and racehorse trainer
- George McLean (footballer, born 1943), Scottish former footballer
- Johnny "Dandy" Rodríguez (born 1945), American bongo player
- Dandy Sakano (born 1967), Japanese comedian

== See also ==
- Phillip Kastel (1893–1962), American gangster and gambler nicknamed "Dandy Phil"
- Don Meredith (1938–2010), American football quarterback, sports commentator and actor nicknamed "Dandy Don"
- 17th Lancers, a British Army cavalry regiment nicknamed "Bingham's Dandies" which participated in the Charge of the Light Brigade
