= 1973 Angolan Legislative Assembly election =

- 19–27 March 1973
- 32 of the 53 seats in the Legislative Assembly
- Turnout: 85.6%

Elections to a Legislative Assembly were held for the first and only time in Portuguese Angola between 19 and 27 March 1973.

== Background ==
On 2 May 1972 the Portuguese National Assembly passed the Organic Law for the Overseas Territories, which provided for greater autonomy for overseas territories. Angola was to have a 53-member Legislative Assembly, of which 32 would be elected. The remainder would be nominated by public services, religious groups and business groups.

Candidates were required to be Portuguese citizens who had lived in Angola for more than three years and be able to read and write Portuguese. Voters were required to be literate. As the Portuguese constitution banned political parties at the time, the majority of candidates were put forward by the ruling People's National Action movement, although some civic associations were allowed to nominate candidates.

== Results ==
Out of a total population of 5,673,046, only 584,000 people registered to vote. Voter turnout was 85.6%. The elected members included 29 whites and 24 blacks.
