= Tanda, Bhopal =

Tanda
- village
- Location within Madhya Pradesh Location within India
- Coordinates: 23.5414252°N 77.3927304°E
- Country: India
- State: Madhya Pradesh
- District: Bhopal
- Tehsil: Berasia
- Elevation: 488 m (1,601 ft)

Population (2011)
  - Total: 668
- Time zone: UTC+5:30 (IST)
- ISO 3166 code: MP-IN
- 2011 census code: 482278

Tanda is a village in the Bhopal district of Madhya Pradesh, India. It is located in the Berasia tehsil.

== Demographics ==
According to the 2011 census of India, Tanda has 141 households. The effective literacy rate (i.e. the literacy rate of population excluding children aged 6 and below) is 52.82%.

Demographics (2011 Census)
	Total	Male	Female
Population	668	364	304
Children aged below 6 years	83	43	40
Scheduled caste	34	17	17
Scheduled tribe	14	10	4
Literates	309	217	92
Workers (all)	231	179	52
Main workers (total)	209	172	37
Main workers: Cultivators	133	120	13
Main workers: Agricultural labourers	61	40	21
Main workers: Household industry workers	7	6	1
Main workers: Other	8	6	2
Marginal workers (total)	22	7	15
Marginal workers: Cultivators	5	3	2
Marginal workers: Agricultural labourers	16	4	12
Marginal workers: Household industry workers	1	0	1
Marginal workers: Others	0	0	0
Non-workers	437	185	252
