= Danda Mohamed Kondeh =

Danda Mohamed Kondeh (born in Koinadugu District, Sierra Leone) is a Sierra Leonean economist and politician. He is currently a member of the parliament of Sierra Leone from his home district of Koinadugu. He is a member of the ruling All People's Congress (APC).

Kondeh was the Central Neya Chiefdom Administrative in Koinadugu district. He also served as Finance Clerk and District Councilor of Koinadugu District before he won a seat in the Sierra Leone Parliament in the 2007 Sierra Leone presidential and Parliamentary elections. Kondeh is a Muslim and a member of the Mandingo ethnic group originating from Guinea.
