= Dandi Adigal Nayanar =

Personal life
- Born: Tiruvarur
- Honors: Nayanar saint

Religious life
- Religion: Hinduism
- Philosophy: Shaivism, Bhakti

Dandi Adigal Nayanar or Dandiyadigal Nayanar is the 31st Nayanar saint. Traditional hagiographies like Periya Puranam (13th century CE) and Thiruthondar Thogai (10th century CE) describe him as a great devotee of the Hindu god Shiva.

== Hagiographical accounts ==
Dandi Adigal, a blind devotee of Shiva, used to often circumambulate the Shiva temple of Tiruvarur, his birthplace in the Chola Kingdom, and was found chanting Shiva Panchakshara mantra while worshipping.

Many Jain structures encroached upon the premises of the Shiva temple of Tiruvarur, then a prominent Jain settlement. Dandi Adigal decided to rebuild the sacred temple tank, whose western bank was accompanied by Jain houses. As Dandi Adigal was blind, he erected a post were the earth needed to be dug and tied a rope to it. The other end of the rope was also tied to another post erected on the bank. He started digging using spade and collected mud in a basket and walked back to the bank by touching the rope and emptied the basket by throwing the mud away. The Jains were irked by the digging, which they felt would harm the earthy micro-organisms and insects, a sin in Jainism. They mocked Dandi Adigal's blindness and in some versions, promised to leave the town if Shiva would restore Dandi Adigal's eyesight. Jains stopped the work by removing the posts and snatching the digging tools.

Dandi Adigal pleaded to Shiva to help. In some versions, Shiva appeared in Dandi Adigal's dream to assure him and then appeared in the Chola King's dream directing him to resolve the affair. In all versions, a miracle happens and Dandi Adigal's eyesight is restored and the Jains become blind in presence of the King. Jains release Tiruvarur after the incident, due to the King's orders or as per their promise or due to the fear of more divine wrath. The renovation of the temple tank was completed by the King.

== Reverence ==
Since it is believed that Dandi Adigal Nayanar was born on sadayam star (Shatabhishek) of the Tamil month Panguni, the specific day is celebrated as Guru Pooja day in all Shiva temples.
