= Tanda, Mansehra =

Tanda Upper Pakhli
- Village and Union Council
- Interactive map of Tanda
- Country: Pakistan
- Region: Khyber Pakhtunkhwa
- District: Mansehra District
- Tehsil: Mansehra

Government
  - Type: Democracy
  - Chairman: muhammad zahir

Population
  - Total: ~11,000
- Time zone: UTC+5 (PST)

Tanda is a village in the Mansehra District of the Khyber Pakhtunkhwa province of Pakistan. It is also the administrative centre of Tanda Union Council, a subdivision of Mansehra Tehsil. It is located at 34°29′N 73°18′E at an elevation of 1037 metres (3405 feet). Most of the inhabitants are of the Swati tribe, subsection Gabri styled as 'Mirs' and known as Panjghols.
