= Raul Danda =

Angolan politician (1957–2021)

Member of the National Assembly of Angola
- In office 2012–2016

Personal details
- Born: 13 November 1957 Cabinda, Portuguese Congo
- Died: 8 May 2021 (aged 63) Luanda, Angola
- Party: UNITA

Raul Danda (13 November 1957 – 8 May 2021) was an Angolan politician. From 2016 to 2021, he was Vice-President of the National Union for the Total Independence of Angola (UNITA).

== Biography ==
Danda earned a degree in business administration from the Universidade Lusíada de Angola. For seven years, he worked at the U.S. Embassy in Angola. From 1991 to 1992, he was General Information Director of UNITA before working as an announcer at Rádio Nacional de Angola. From 1993 to 2006, he worked in the press office at the Ministry, but was detained for 29 days in 2006 for crimes against state security. However, he was never charged.

From 2012 to 2016, Danda served in the National Assembly of Angola. During this time, he led UNITA in Parliament. After his mandate ended, he served as Vice-President of UNITA.

Raul Danda died in Luanda on 8 May 2021 at the age of 63.
