= Dandi Census Town =

DANDIPADA Town
- Census town
- Interactive map of DANDIPADA Town
- Coordinates: 19°48′03″N 72°41′11″E
- Country: India
- State: Maharashtra
- District: Palghar

Languages
  - Official: Marathi
  - Secondary: Hindi
- Time zone: UTC+5:30 (IST)

Dandi Census Town is a census town in the Palghar district of Maharashtra, India. It is located 15 kilometers away from Palghar.

== Demographics ==
According to the 2011 Indian Census, the town has a population of 8,942 people out of which 5,136 are males and 3,806 are females. The average human sex ratio of Dandi is 741.

== Transport ==
Boisar railway station is located approximately 1 kilometer away from Dandi Census Town.
