= Dandy (surname) =

Dandy is a surname. Notable people with the surname include:

- James Edgar Dandy (1903–1976), British botanist
- Raymond Dandy (1887–1953), French actor
- John Garrick (1902–1966), British actor born Reginald Dandy
- Walter Dandy (1886–1946), American neurosurgeon and scientist
