= Danda (novel) =

1970 novel by Nkem Nwankwo

Danda is a 1970 novel by Nigerian writer Nkem Nwankwo. It was published in the African Writers Series and by Open Humanities Press in the United States.
