= Tanda, Raebareli =

Tanda Tānda
- Village
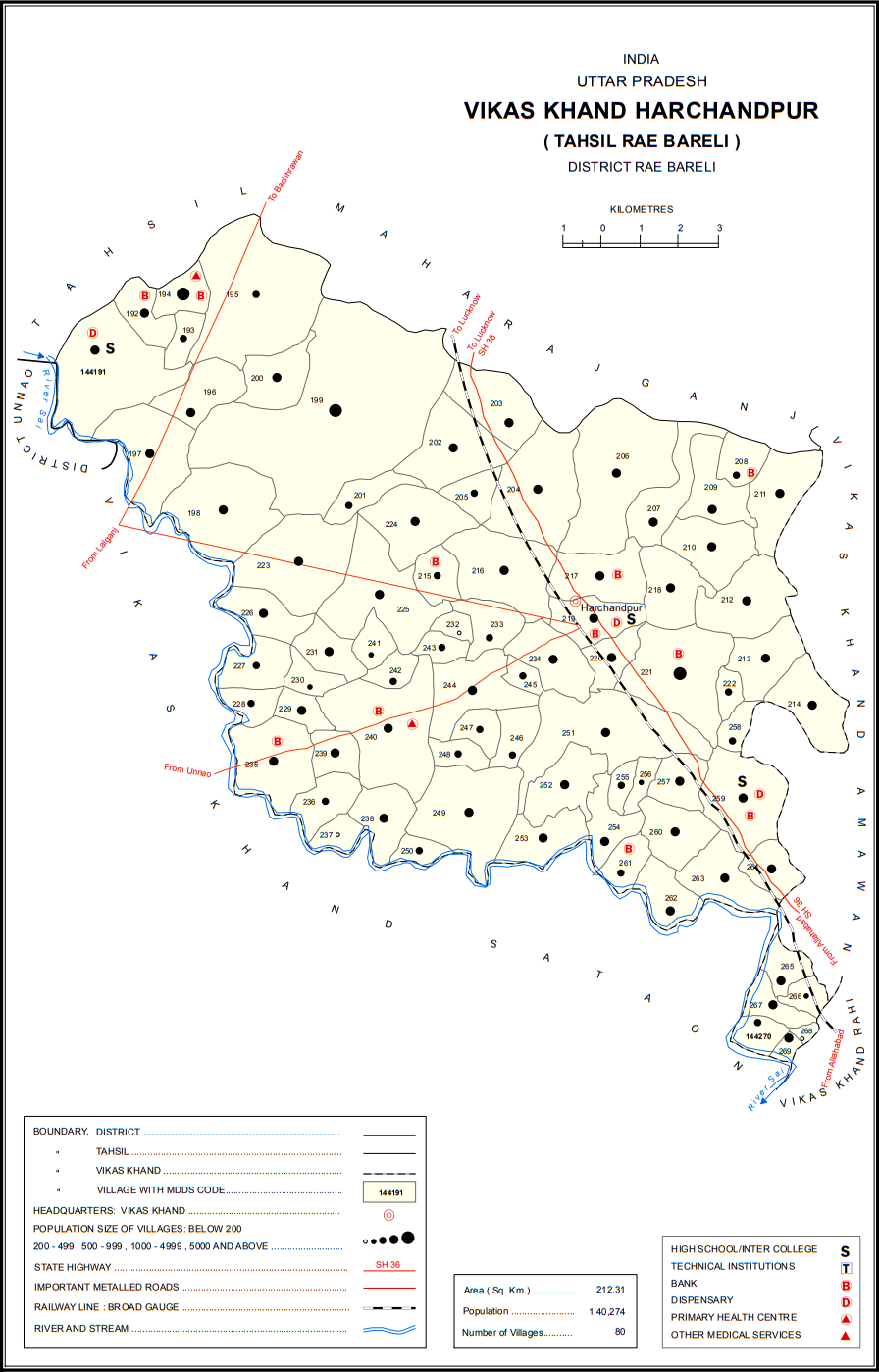
- Map showing Tanda (#264) in Harchandpur CD block

- Location in Uttar Pradesh, India
- Coordinates: 26.28254°N 81.210842°E
- Country India: India
- State: Uttar Pradesh
- District: Raebareli

Area
  - Total: 2.004 km^{2} (0.774 sq mi)

Population (2011)
  - Total: 1,559
  - Density: 777.9/km^{2} (2,015/sq mi)

Languages
  - Official: Hindi
- Time zone: UTC+5:30 (IST)
- Vehicle registration: UP-35

Tanda is a village in Harchandpur block of Rae Bareli district, Uttar Pradesh, India. It is located 5 km from Raebareli, the district headquarters. As of 2011, its population is 1,559, in 312 households. It has one primary school and no healthcare facilities.

The 1961 census recorded Tanda as comprising 4 hamlets, with a total population of 583 people (299 male and 284 female), in 124 households and 111 physical houses. The area of the village was given as 490 acres.

The 1981 census recorded Tanda as having a population of 911 people, in 153 households, and having an area of 200.33 hectares. The main staple foods were given as wheat and rice.
