= Dandy (paddle steamer) =

Danish steamer

History
- Name: Dandy; Jylland; Dandy
- Owner: 1824: J. Gill & A. Gilray, Newcastle; 1825: Louis Oppert, Copenhagen; later: H. P. Ohlsen
- Operator: Louis Oppert, Copenhagen
- Port of registry: (United Kingdom) Newcastle (1824–25); (Denmark) Copenhagen (1825-1826); (Denmark) Altona (1826- )
- Route: Copenhagen - Aarhus (1825-1826)
- Builder: John Bowlt, Gateshead.
- Completed: 1823
- Out of service: 1844 (circa)

General characteristics
- Type: paddle-wheeler
- Tonnage: 24 ton
- Length: 27.9 m (92 ft)
- Beam: 6.5 m (21 ft)
- Draught: 1.6 m (5.2 ft)
- Propulsion: Steam

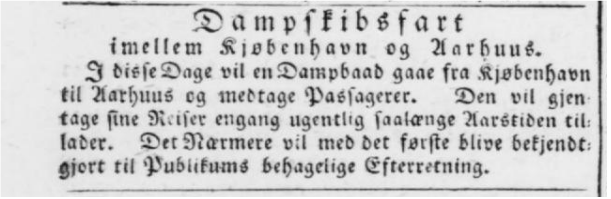
Advertisement for the Jylland in the Aarhus newspaper Aarhuus Stiftstidende, 30 September 1825.

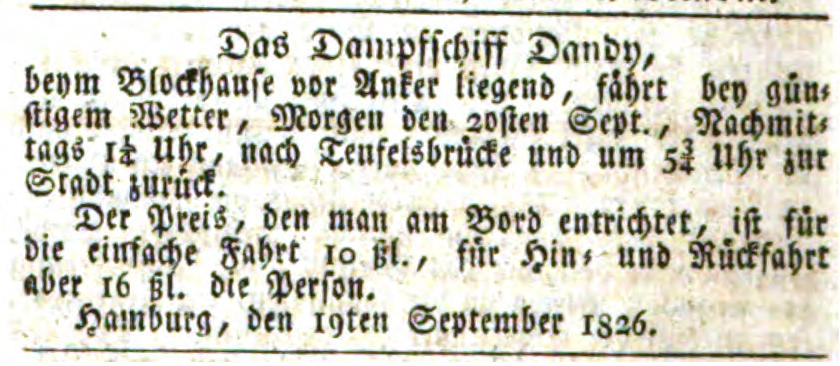
Advertisement for the Dandy in the Hamburg newspaper Staats und Gelehrte Zeitung des Hamburgischen unpartheyischen Correspondenten, 19 September 1826.

Dandy was a paddle-wheel steamer, built in England in 1823. The ship was bought in 1825 by a Danish businessman and employed on the route between Copenhagen and Aarhus with the new name Jylland. The small steamer was not well suited for the job and in 1826 it was sent to Altona in Hamburg, where it got the name Dandy back and sailed between towns on the Elbe river. It was still present in the ship list from Altona in 1843, but by 1845 it was gone.

== Under British colours ==
John Bowlt had a shipyard on the River Tyne at Gateshead. According to the sources, he built his first steamship in 1814 and after that he continued a production of small paddle steamers. In 1823 he built the Dandy, which was taken over by J. Gill & A. Gilray of Newcastle in December 1824. In August 1825 the ship was removed from the British ship registry, noted as sold abroad.

== Under Danish colours ==
The overseas buyer was the Danish merchant Louis Oppert of Copenhagen. Dandy arrived in that city on 14 September 1825 and she was entered in the Danish shipping registry as the Jylland (alternatively spelled as Jydland and Jülland). The name was an indicator of the route she was bought to operate, between Copenhagen on Zealand and Aarhus in Jylland. The first departure from Copenhagen was on 30 September 1825. Jylland was not the first steamship project by Oppert. In February 1824 he had bought the schooner Zerlina in Karlskrona in Sweden. His plan was to convert it into a steamship, and between July 1824 and February 1825 the schooner was at Jacob Holm's wharf for machinery installation, but it was never carried out - technical and economical challenges may have arisen, but the available sources are silent about this. Therefore, the planned route between Copenhagen and Neustadt in Holstein never materialized, and Oppert instead decided on a route to Jylland, where steamships had not gone before. The new service was reported in Aarhuus Stiftstidende on 30 September 1825 and the newspaper carried an advertisement on the same day, where Oppert wrote (translated to English):

A steamship service between Copenhagen and Aarhus.
In these days a steamboat will go from Copenhagen to Aarhus and accommodate passengers. It will repeat its journeys once every week for as long as the weather permits. More will be announced presently to suit the public.

Jylland is often referred to as a steamboat - she was not a big ship - and her size was a problem on the relatively long voyage to Jylland. In unfavorable winds she did not have space for coal for the whole trip, so at her first planned stop at Helsingør it was often necessary to embark more coal. On her journey from Copenhagen on 25 July 1826 things went bad. On arrival at Helsingør she lacked coal, so Louis Oppert, who had gone along for the trip, went ashore to procure more fuel. But instead of buying coal, he just returned to Copenhagen. The ship had to struggle on to Aarhus on a combination of hastily bought peat, with a supplement of wood chopped from the ship's compartments. The passengers had to spend a night on the remote Sjællands Odde and were in a rather worn out state when they eventually reached Aarhus. The tragicomic turn of events was referred in the Copenhagen weekly Politivennen on 5 August 1826, and that spelled the end of the route.

Instead, Louis Oppert dispatched the Jylland to Altona, where it was employed out of Hamburg on the Elbe. In December 1826 it officially reverted to the former name Dandy, but that name had featured in local advertisements since September 1826 for a service between Hamburg and Teufelsbrück, and later on the route went between Hamburg, Blankenese, Brunshausen at Stade and Glückstadt. In 1843, when Carsten Henrik Mossin published his list of Danish ships, Fortegnelse over de i Kongeriget Danmark og Hertugdømmerne Slesvig og Holsteen hjemmehørende Fartøier af 10 Commerce-Læsters Drægtighed og derover, the Dandy was still registered in Altona, but now owned by H. P. Ohlsen. When Mossin sent out the 1845 edition of the book, the Dandy was missing, so she was probably discarded just after 1843.
