= 1986 Angolan parliamentary election =

- 9 December 1986
- All 290 seats in the National People's Assembly; 145 seats needed for a majority
| Party | Leader | Seats | +/– |
|---|---|---|---|
| MPLA | José Eduardo dos Santos | 173 | −56 |
| Non-party members | – | 116 | New |
This lists parties that won seats. See the complete results below.

Parliamentary elections were held in Angola on 9 December 1986. They had been scheduled for 1983, but were postponed due to the National Union for the Total Independence of Angola's (UNITA) military gains in the civil war. The elections were the second elections conducted in the nation after in got independence from Portugal in 1975 and after the 1980 elections. During the period of 1975 to 1980, a civil war was fought between three parties, namely, People's Movement for the Liberation of Angola (MPLA), National Front for the Liberation of Angola (FNLA), and the National Union for the Total Independence of Angola (UNITA) and the disturbance continued to the 90s.

At the time, the country was a one-party state, with the MPLA as the sole legal party. As a result, most candidates were members of the party, and two-thirds were re-nominated from 1980 elections. The MPLA won 173 out of the 289 seats, while there were 116 non-party members and one seat remained vacant. The elected assemblies took the oath on 30 January 1987 and José Eduardo dos Santos took the oath as the second elected President of Angola.

== Electoral system ==
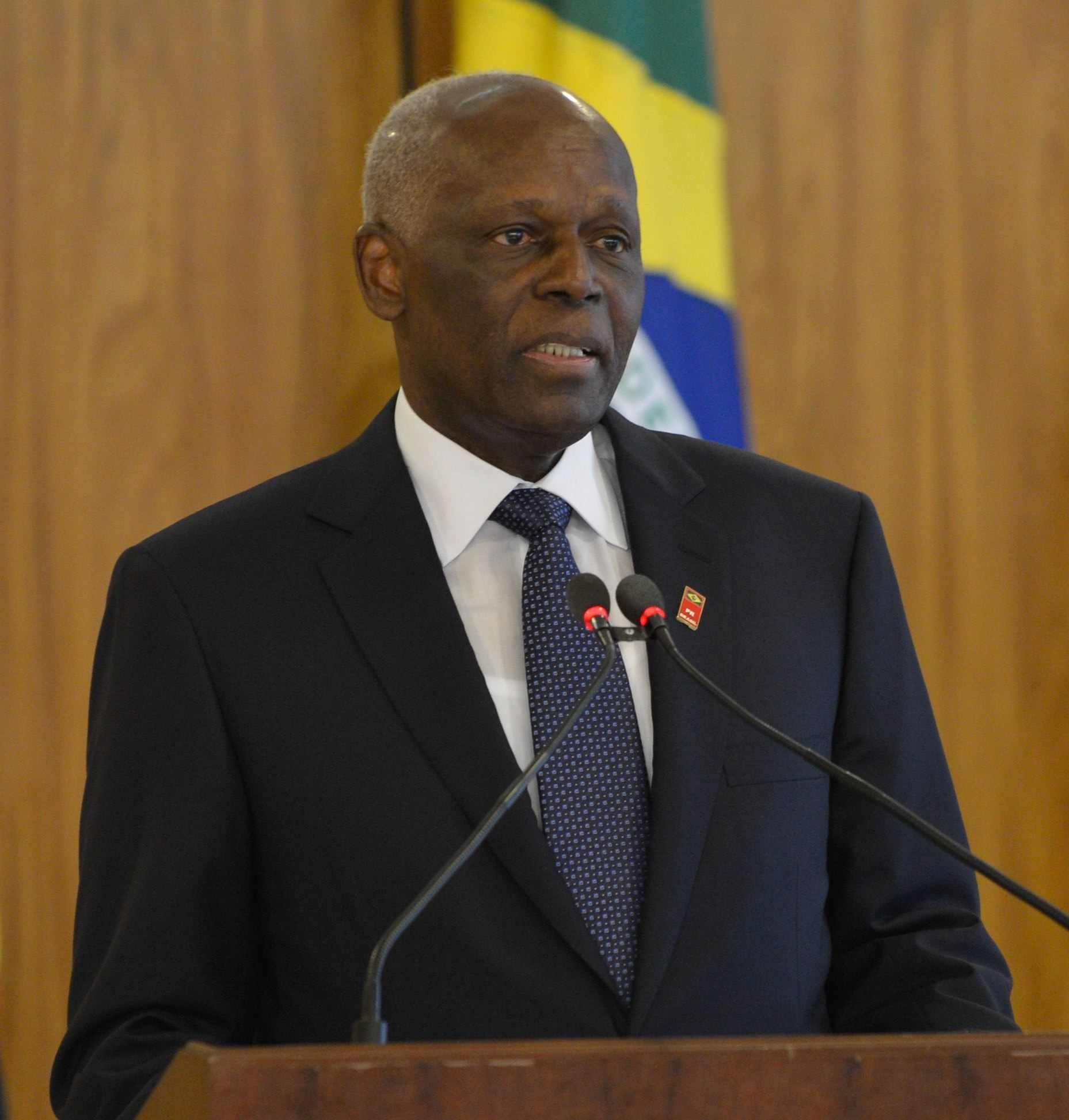
José Eduardo dos Santos who won and became the President of Angola in the elections

The Unicameral Parliament of Angola was scheduled to be constituted with the 289 elected members (up from 229 in 1980 elections) for a three-year term. All Angolan citizens with 18 years of age were eligible to cast their vote. Citizens who were members of factional groups, had criminal record and who had not rehabilitated were barred from exercising their voting rights. The representatives of the provincial assemblies formed a college and they elected the representatives of the House of Parliament. The candidates were expected to be answerable to the citizens in public meetings, with their candidature approved by a majority in the province where they were getting nominated. A constitutional amendment on 19 August 1980 indicated that the council would be replaced by a national people's assembly and there would be 18 elected assemblies.

== Results ==
Elections were held on 9 December for all 18 assemblies and members of the electoral college for the legislature. Most candidates were members of the MPLA, and those that were not were vetted to ensure that they were not elected to the colleges. The party invited more candidates from various sections of the society and nominated several women. The party re-nominated close to two-thirds of sitting members from the 1980 elections. The President opened the first session on 30 January 1987 and José Eduardo dos Santos took the oath as the elected President of Angola for a second term.

| Party | Seats |
|---|---|
| MPLA | 173 |
| Non-party members | 116 |
| Vacant seats | 1 |
| Total | 290 |
Source: IPU
