= 1980 Angolan parliamentary election =

- 1980
- All 229 seats in the National People's Assembly; 115 seats needed for a majority
Party	Leader	Seats	+/–
MPLA	José Eduardo dos Santos	229	New
This lists parties that won seats. See the complete results below.

Parliamentary elections were held in Angola in 1980, the first elections following independence from Portugal in 1975. The country was a one-party state, with the People's Movement for the Liberation of Angola – Labour Party (MPLA-PT) as the sole legal party. Non-party candidates were vetted to ensure that they were not elected to the colleges. As a result, all 229 elected MPs were from the MPLA–PT.

== Electoral system ==
The elections were held on an indirect two-stage basis. Beginning on 23 August, voters elected electoral colleges, which in turn elected 229 candidates to the National Assembly. All Angolan citizens with 18 years of age were eligible to vote in the first stage of the elections, except those who were members of factional groups, had a criminal record and who had not been rehabilitated. Candidates were expected to be answerable to the citizens in public meetings, with their candidature approved by a majority in the province where they were getting nominated.

== Results ==
The 229 representatives included 64 civil servants, 58 workers, 48 peasants, 20 members of defense or security forces, 7 intellectuals, 6 elements of state apparatus and 26 others.

== Aftermath ==
The newly elected parliament convened for the first time on 11 November 1980.
