= João Lourenço =

President of Angola since 2017

His Excellency João Lourenço GColIH
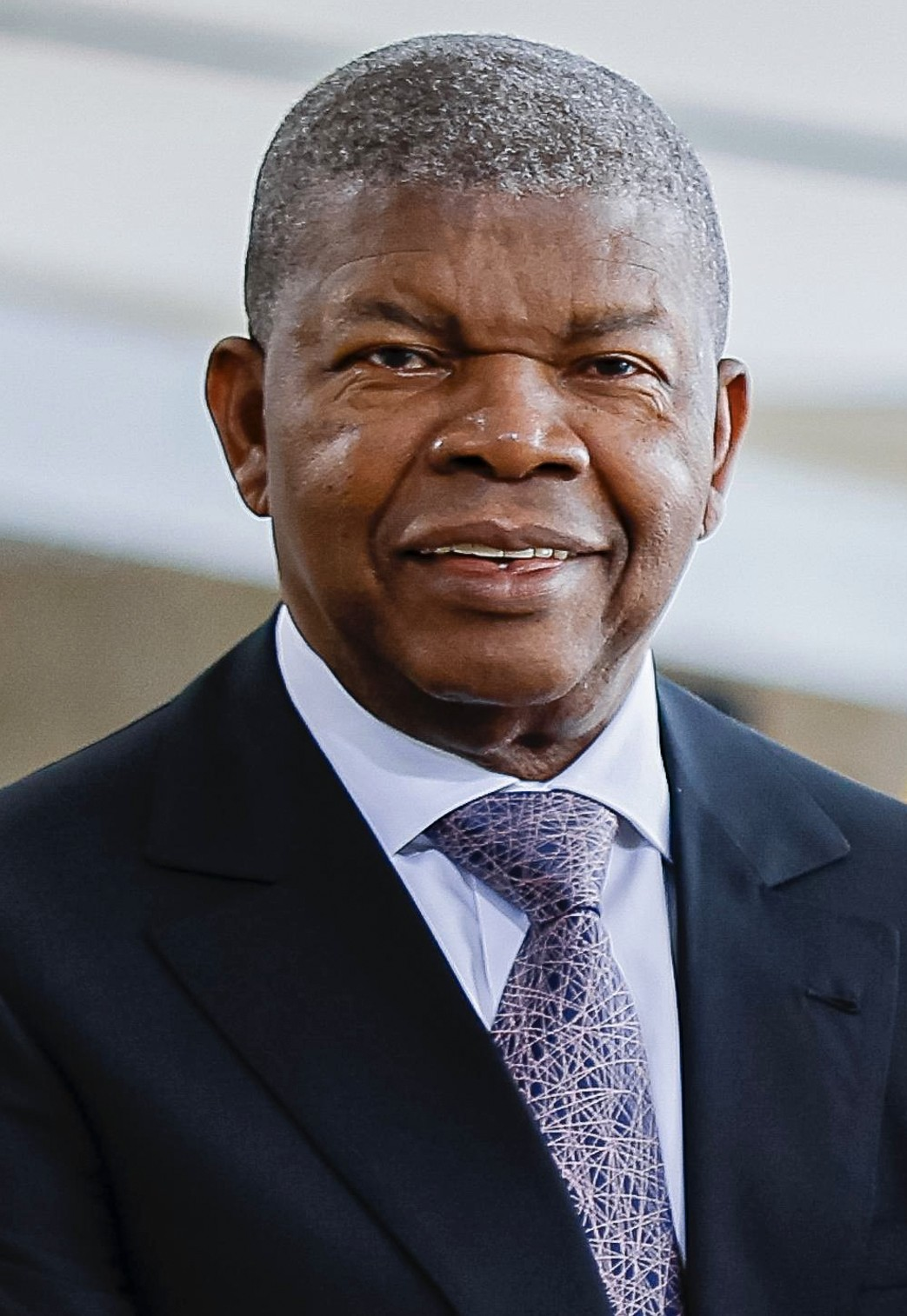
- Lourenço in 2025

3rd President of Angola
- Incumbent
- Assumed office 26 September 2017
- Vice President: Bornito de Sousa (2017–2022); Esperança da Costa (2022–present)
- Preceded by: José Eduardo dos Santos

23rd Chairperson of the African Union
- In office 15 February 2025 – 14 February 2026
- Preceded by: Mohamed Ould Ghazouani
- Succeeded by: Évariste Ndayishimiye

Chairman of the MPLA
- Incumbent
- Assumed office 8 September 2018
- Preceded by: José Eduardo dos Santos

Minister of National Defence
- In office 22 April 2014 – 24 July 2017
- President: José Eduardo dos Santos
- Preceded by: Cândido Pereira dos Santos Van-Dúnem
- Succeeded by: Salviano de Jesus Sequeira

Chairman of Southern African Development Community
- In office 17 August 2023 – 17 August 2024
- Preceded by: Felix Tshisekedi
- Succeeded by: Emmerson Mnangagwa

Personal details
- Born: 5 March 1954 (age 72) Lobito, Portuguese Angola
- Party: MPLA (since 1974)
- Spouse: Ana Afonso Dias
- Children: Manuel Dias Pereira more 5
- Education: Industrial Institute of Luanda; Lenin Superior Academy
- Nickname(s): Ti Mimoso, JLo

Military service
- Allegiance: Angola
- Branch/service: Angolan Army
- Years of service: 1974–2017
- Rank: Army general
- Battles/wars: Angolan War of Independence; Cabinda War; Angolan Civil War; Second Congo War; Second Brazzaville-Congolese Civil War

João Manuel Gonçalves Lourenço GColIH (Portuguese pronunciation: [ˈʒwɐ̃w̃ mɐˈnwɛl ɡõˈsal.vɨʒ lo(w)ˈɾẽ.su]; born 5 March 1954) is an Angolan politician who is currently serving as the third president of Angola since 26 September 2017. Previously, he was the minister of defence from 2014 to 2017. In September 2018, he became the chairman of the People's Movement for the Liberation of Angola (MPLA), the ruling party. He was the party's secretary-general from 1998 to 2003.

João Lourenço was designated in December 2016 to occupy the party's number one position in the August 2017 legislative election. In terms of the 2010 constitution, "the individual heading the national list of the political party or coalition of political parties which receives the most votes in general elections ... shall be elected President of the Republic and Head of the Executive" (Article 109). As the MPLA won a majority of 150 seats, Lourenço automatically became President of Angola, succeeding José Eduardo dos Santos, who had been in power for 38 years. Lourenço was officially sworn into office on 26 September 2017.

== Early life ==
Born in 1954, Lourenço grew up in a politically engaged family of ten children. His father, Sequeira João Lourenço (1923–1999), a native of Malanje, was a doctor and nationalist, who served three years of imprisonment in Portuguese Angola for illegal political activity. His mother, Josefa Gonçalves Cipriano Lourenço (1928–1997), a seamstress, was a native of Namibe. He received both a primary and secondary Portuguese-language education in Bié Province and Luanda.

== Education and military career ==
Lourenço studied at the Industrial Institute of Luanda and later participated in the liberation struggle in Ponta Negra, in August 1974, where he was part of the first group of MPLA soldiers to enter Angolan territory via Miconge, towards the city of Cabinda after the fall of the Portuguese colonial regime.

He began his military career fighting against the Portuguese in the Angolan War of Independence and fought as a member of the MPLA in the Angolan Civil War. Lourenço conducted his training in artillery and then became a political officer in the MPLA. In 1978, Lourenço traveled to the Soviet Union and studied at the Lenin Military-Political Academy, where he furthered his military training and completed a master's degree in Historical Sciences. He later returned to Angola in 1982. Now an artillery general, Lourenço turned towards politics and in 1984 was appointed as Governor of Moxico Province.

== Political career ==
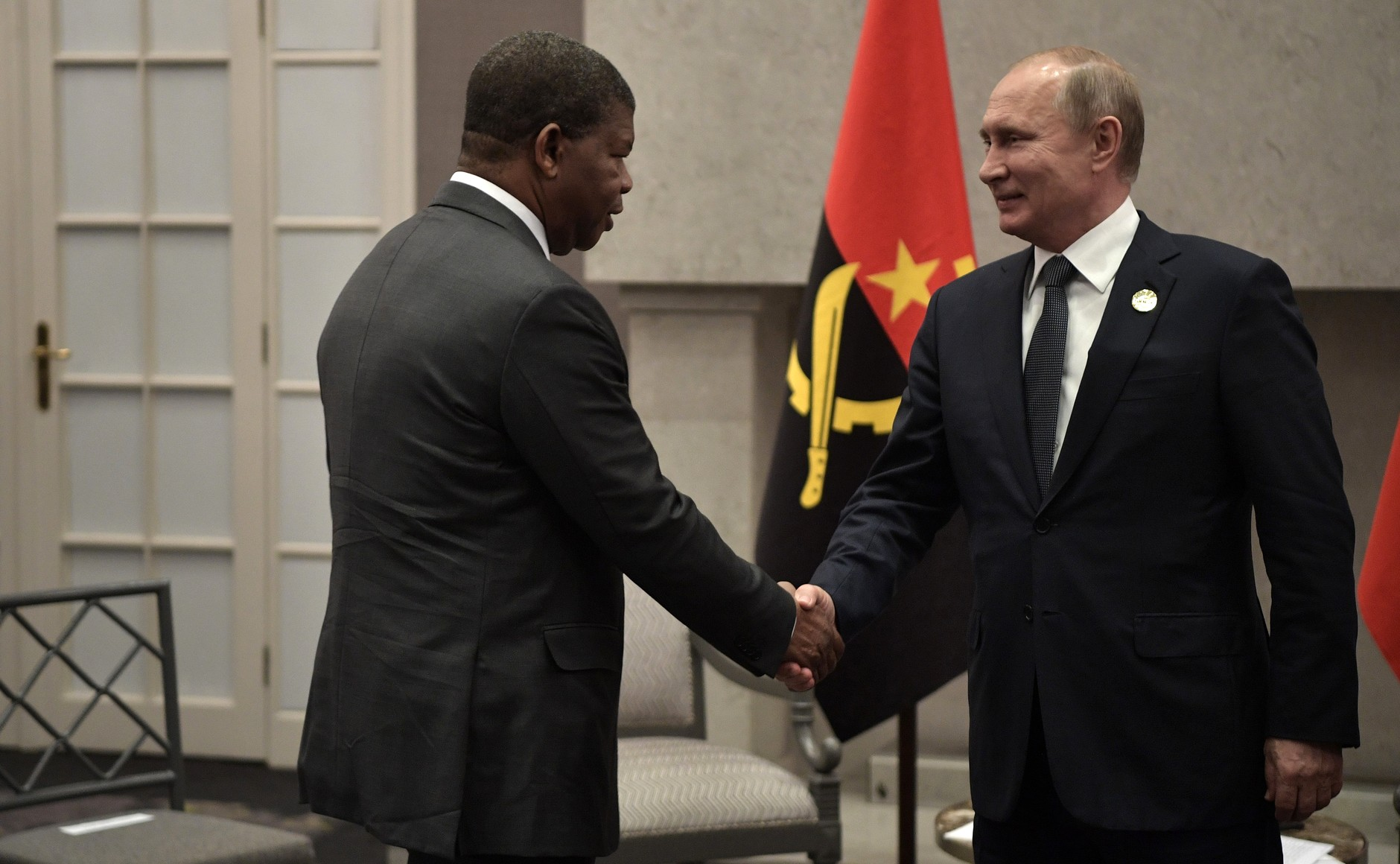
Lourenço with Russian president Vladimir Putin in 2018

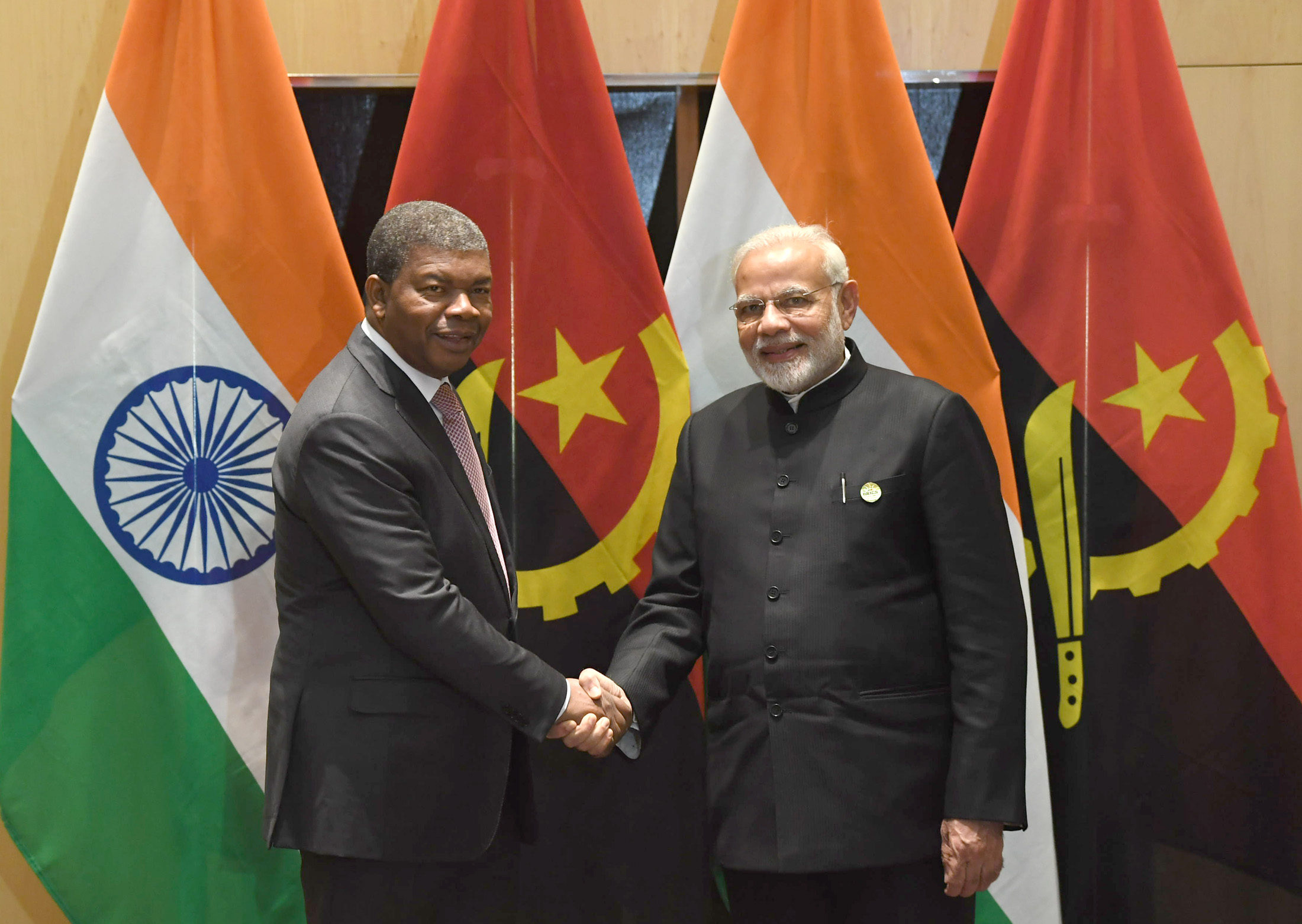
Lourenço with Indian prime minister Narendra Modi in 2018

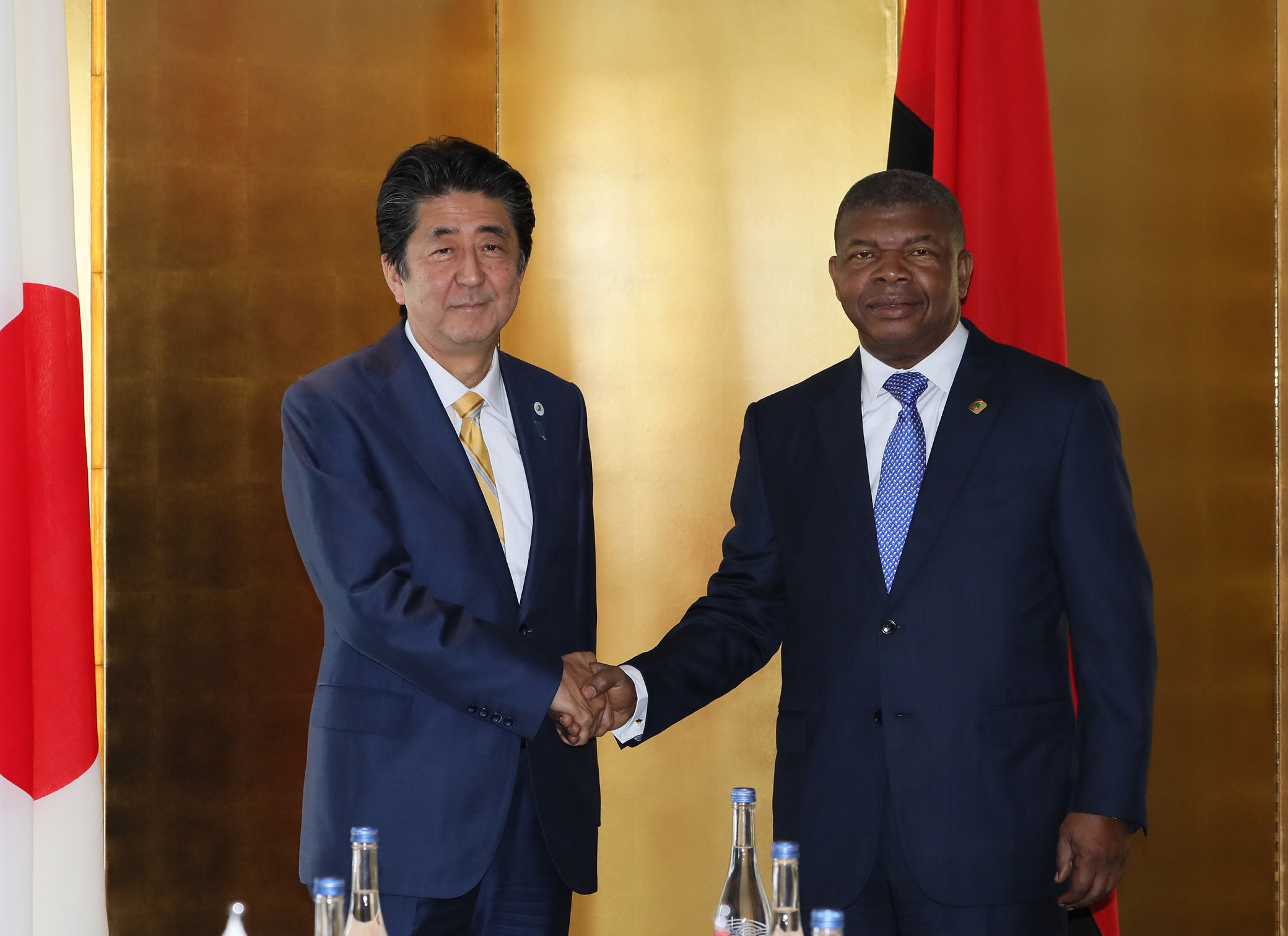
Lourenço with Japanese prime minister Shinzo Abe in 2019

Lourenço's early politics were mainly confined within the MPLA as an officer responsible for keeping guerrilla soldiers' morale high. Following his appointment as Governor of Moxico Province in 1984, he continued to rise through the ranks of the ruling party. He also served as the provincial commissioner of Moxico Province for the MPLA, president of the Regional Military Council of the 3rd Military Political Region, First Secretary of MPLA and Provincial Commissioner of Benguela Province. He was the MPLA's Secretary for Information from 1992 to 1997 and President of the MPLA Parliamentary Group in the National Assembly from 1993 to 1998.

At a party congress, he was elected as Secretary-General of the MPLA on 12 December 1998. His election was said to be linked to the favour of President José Eduardo dos Santos and it was thought that Lourenço could potentially succeed the long-ruling dos Santos at some point. However, after dos Santos said in 2001 that he would not seek re-election as president, Lourenço openly expressed an interest in becoming the MPLA's presidential candidate and thereby damaged his standing with dos Santos, who apparently had no real intention of leaving office, but had sought to expose political rivals. Juilão Mateus Paulo succeeded him as MPLA Secretary-General at a December 2003 party congress.

Lourenço was First Vice-president of the National Assembly from 2003 to 2014. He was appointed as Minister of Defense in April 2014, and he was designated as vice-president of the MPLA in August 2016. In September 2018, he became the Chairman of the MPLA, replacing José Eduardo dos Santos.

Lourenço is very close to Elliott Broidy. Through Broidy's firm Circinus, Broidy allegedly received $6 million in January 2017 for lobbying on behalf of the interests of Angola by arranging meetings with Angolans and several Republican United States Senators including Ron Johnson and Tom Cotton, fostering a closer relationship between Washington, and Luanda, attempting to arrange meetings among Lourenço and Mike Pence and Donald Trump and allowing Lourenço to attend a September 2017 event at Trump's Mar-a-Lago club of which Broidy is a member, however, Lourenço did not attend.

== President of Angola (2017-present) ==
In December 2016, the MPLA designated Lourenço as the party's top candidate in the 2017 legislative election. He was elected president of Angola on 23 August 2017 and took office on 26 September becoming the third president in the country's history. On 8 September 2018, he was elected president of the MPLA, Angola's ruling party since 1975, becoming its 5th party leader.

In June 2018, Lourenço legalised Angola's first LGBT collective. The following January, he replaced the 1886 colonial law banning homosexual acts, and prohibited discrimination against LGBT people. The reforms also permitted abortion in cases of rape or danger to mother or fetus.

He has served as the ceremonial Chairperson of the African Union from February 15, 2025 to February 14, 2026. Prior to this, he served as a mediator in resolving the conflict in the Democratic Republic of the Congo. Lourenço also mediated an agreement with Gabonese president Brice Oligui Nguema that allowed for the latter's predecessor, Ali Bongo, whom he had overthrown and imprisoned in the 2023 Gabonese coup d'état, to go into exile in Angola.

In 2025, Lourenço was nominated for the Nobel Peace Prize.

== Personal life ==
He is married to Ana Afonso Dias Lourenço, a Member of Parliament of the MPLA and former Minister of Planning, who held a position at the World Bank in Washington D.C. until October 2016. They have three daughters named Jessica Lorena Dias Lourenço, Cristina Giovanna Dias Lourenço and Ana Isabel Dias Lourenço. From a previous relationship, with Paula Maria Fernandes Pires, his eldest son Henrique Manuel Pires "Iko" Lourenço was born. In addition to those mentioned, they have two other children, all of whom are currently active in the MPLA. Apart from his indigenous Umbundu language and Portuguese, he speaks Russian, Spanish, and English. He is popularly nicknamed "Ti Mimoso" and "JLo".

In his youth he practiced Shotokan karate (being a black belt) and was an amateur footballer. He maintains his hobbies of reading, chess and horse riding.

== Honours ==
=== Foreign honours ===
- Algeria:
  - Recipient of the National Order of Merit (11 May 2026)
- Brazil:
  - Collar of the Order of the Southern Cross (25 August 2023)
- Cape Verde:
  - 1st Class of the Amílcar Cabral Order (16 March 2022)
- Cuba:
  - Order of José Martí (1 July 2019)
- France:
  - Grand Officer of the Legion of Honour (16 January 2025)
- Guinea:
  - Grand Cross of the National Order of Merit (30 July 2021)
- Italy:
  - Knight Grand Cross with Collar of the Order of Merit of the Italian Republic (19 May 2023)
- Ivory Coast
  - Grand Cross of the National Order of the Ivory Coast (28 June 2024)
- Namibia:
  - First Class of the Order of the Welwitschia (4 May 2018)
- Portugal:
  - Grand Collar of the Order of Prince Henry (22 November 2018)
- Senegal:
  - Grand Cross of the National Order of the Lion (23 October 2022)
- Serbia
  - 2nd class of the Order of the Republic of Serbia (15 February 2022)
- South Africa:
  - Order of South Africa (12 December 2024)
- Spain:
  - Collar of the Order of Civil Merit (31 January 2023)

== See also ==
- July 2025 Angolan protests
- List of current heads of state and government
- List of heads of the executive by approval rating

Political offices
Preceded by Celestino Figueiredo Tchinhama Faísca	Provincial Commissioner of Moxico; 1983–1986	Succeeded by Jaime Baptista Ndonge
Preceded by Kundi Paihama	Provincial Commissioner of Benguela; 1986–1989	Succeeded by Paulo Teixeira Jorge
Preceded by Cândido P. dos Santos Van-Dúnem	Minister of Defense; 2014–2017	Succeeded by Salviano de Jesus Sequeira Kianda
Preceded by José Eduardo dos Santos	President of Angola; 2017–present	Incumbent
