= National Assembly (Angola) =

Unicameral legislature of Angola

Coordinates: 8°49′10″S 13°13′43″E

National Assembly Assembleia Nacional
- 5th National Assembly of Angola

Type
- Type: Unicameral

History
- Founded: 1980; 46 years ago

Leadership
- President: João Lourenço, MPLA
- President of the National Assembly: Adão Francisco Correia de Almeida, MPLA since 17 November 2025
- Secretary General: Pedro Neri, MPLA

Structure
- Seats: 220
- National Assembly political groups: Government (124): MPLA (124); Official opposition (90): UNITA (90); Other parties (6): FNLA (2); Social Renewal (2); Humanist Party (2)

Elections
- National Assembly voting system: Closed-list proportional representation
- First National Assembly election: 11 November 1980
- Last National Assembly election: 24 August 2022
- Next National Assembly election: August 2027

Meeting place
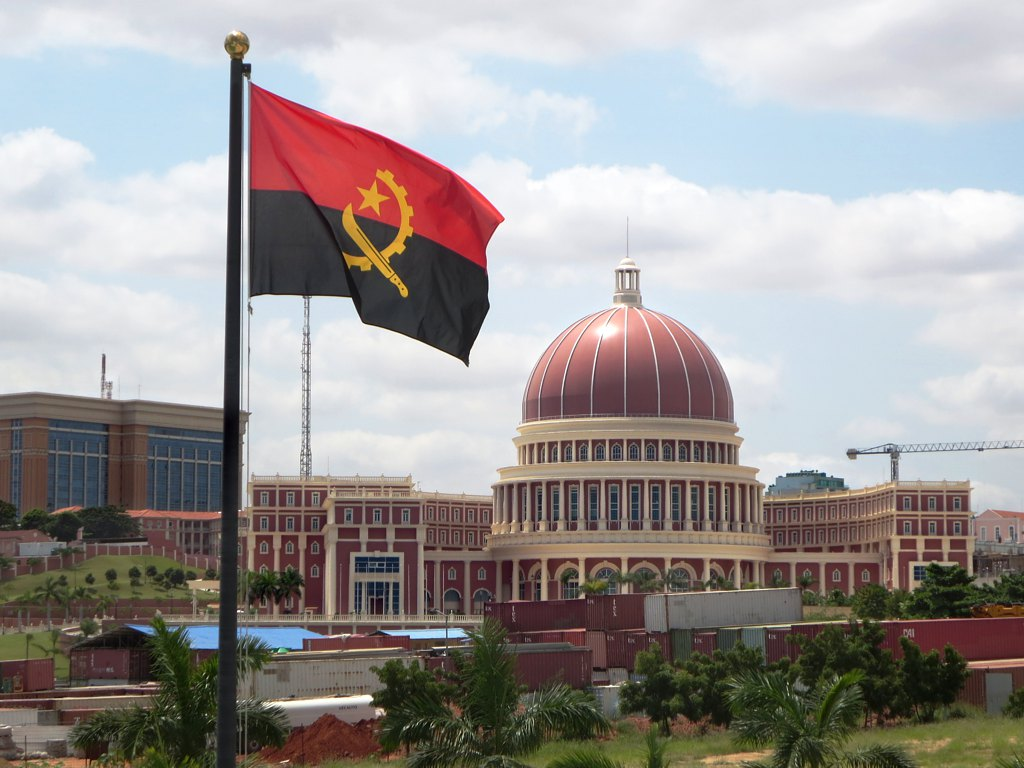
- National Assembly building in Luanda

Website
- www.parlamento.ao

The National Assembly (Portuguese: Assembleia Nacional) is the legislative branch of the government of Angola. Angola is a unicameral country so the National Assembly is the only legislative chamber at the national level. The People's Movement for the Liberation of Angola (MPLA) has held a majority in the Assembly since Angolan independence in 1975.

Multi-party elections were delayed under Jose Eduardo dos Santos quasi-dictatorial rule for decades until the 1992 Angolan general election. Another election wouldn't be held until 2008 due to the second phase of the Angolan Civil War. After a new constitution was adopted in 2010, the first election under this new constitution was held in 2012.

== Election ==
The 220 members of the National Assembly are elected by two methods: 90 are elected in 18 five-seat constituencies, by party-list proportional representation using the d'Hondt method. The other 130 are selected by party-list proportional representation using closed lists, allocated proportionally to the nationwide vote tallies.

== Jurisdiction ==
As of 2015, the Angolan government was composed of three branches of government: executive, legislative, and judicial. The executive branch of the government is composed of the President, the Vice-Presidents and the Council of Ministers. The legislative branch comprises a 220-seat unicameral legislature elected from both provincial and nationwide constituencies. On account of civil wars from independence, political power has been concentrated in the presidency. There are various temporary and permanent committees in the Assembly that help in the operational and administrative functions of the Assembly.

== Selection of members as of 1980 ==
The Unicameral Parliament of Angola was scheduled originally in 1980 to be constituted of 229 elected members. for a period of three years after the elections. All Angolan citizens with 18 years of age were eligible to cast their vote. Citizens who were members of factional groups, had a criminal record and who had not been rehabilitated were barred from exercising their voting rights. The representatives of the provincial assemblies formed a college and they elected the representatives of the House of Parliament. The candidates were expected to be answerable to the citizens in public meetings, with their candidature approved by a majority in the province where they were getting nominated. A constitutional amendment on 19 August 1980 indicated that the Council formed during interim would be replaced by a national people's assembly and there would be 18 elected assemblies.

== Premises ==
The original building of the National Assembly from 1980, also called People's Assembly, was located in Estúdio/Restauração Cinema in Luanda s urban district of Ingombota.

The new building was initiated on 15 October 2009, construction started on 17 May 2010 and it was inaugurated on 9 November 2015. It is a part of the Political Administrative Centre covering an area of 72,000 Sq.m and a built area of 54,000 sq.m. The Centre accommodates a Presidential Palace, the Palace of Justice, the Defence Ministry, the Ministry of Justice and Human Rights, the Episcopal Palace and the premises of the former National Assembly headquarters. The New Assembly has 4,600 seats overall with 1,200 in meeting rooms. The compound has four blocks each with six floors, a basement parking that can accommodate 494 vehicles, out of which 34 is reserved for VIPs. The construction was carried out by Portuguese company Teixeira Duarte under the supervision of Special Works Office of the Government of Angola. The building was inaugurated by José Eduardo dos Santos on 10 November 2015.

== Historical performance of political parties ==
The People's Movement for the Liberation of Angola (MPLA) has held a majority in the Assembly since Angolan independence in 1975. Jose Eduardo dos Santos won the 1980 and 1986 "elections" and became the first elected President of the country, when it was a one-party state known as the Angolan People's Republic, with the People's Movement for the Liberation of Angola - Party of Labour (MPLA-PT) as the sole legal party. As a result, most candidates were members of the party, and two-thirds were re-nominated from 1980 elections in the 1986 elections. The Angolan Civil War (1975-2002) continued with UNITA fighting against the MLPA, with both parties taking international support. During 1989, there was a cease-fire agreement with the leader of UNITA, Jonas Savimbi, but it collapsed soon. As part of its peace efforts, MLPA dropped its theme of Marxism–Leninism and moved over to democratic socialism. In May 1991, Dos Santos and Savimbi signed a multiparty democracy agreement in Lisbon.

Dos Santos won the 1992, 2008 and 2012 elections as well in the Presidency elections, but since 1992 multiple parties started performing. During the 1992 election, the first multi-party election, UNITA secured 34 per cent vote in the assembly and won 70 seats. But during the 2008 and 2012, their win was reduced to 16 and 32 seats respectively, while the ruling MPLA won 191 and 175 seats respectively.

A new constitution was adopted in 2010, the first elections under this new constitution were held in 2012.

== See also ==
- List of presidents of the National Assembly of Angola
- Politics of Angola
- List of legislatures by country
