= Cabinet of Angola =

Republic of Angola chief executive body

Logo of the Government of Angola

The Cabinet of Angola is the chief executive body of the Republic of Angola.

Cabinet of Angola
Office	Incumbent
Vice President	Esperanca Francisco Da Costa
Minister of Agriculture and Forestry	António Francisco de Assis
Minister of Public Works, Urban Planning and Housing	Carlos Alberto Gregório Dos Santos
Minister of Culture	Filipe Silvino De Pina Zau
Minister of National Defence	João Ernesto dos Santos
Minister of Economy and Planning	Victor Hugo Guilherme
Minister of Education	Maria Cândida Pereira Teixeira
Minister of Energy and Water	João Baptista Borges
Minister of Environment	Paula Cristina Francisco Coelho
Minister of External Relations	Tete António
Minister of Finance	Vera Esperança dos Santos Daves de Sousa
Minister of Fisheries and Sea	Victória Francisco Lopes Cristóvão de Barros Neto
Minister of Health	Sílvia Paula Valentim Lutucuta
Minister of Higher Education, Science, Technology and Innovation	Paula Regina Simões de Oliveira
Minister of Hotels and Tourism	Márcio de Jesus Lopes Daniel
Minister of Industry	Rui Miguens de Oliveira
Minister of Interior	Eugénio César Laborinho
Minister of Justice and Human Rights	Marcy Claudio Lopes
Minister of Mineral Resources and Petroleum	Diamantino Pedro Azevedo
Minister of Parliamentary Affairs	Rosa Luís de Sousa Micolo
Minister of Public Administration, Labour and Social Security	Jesus Faria Maiato
Minister of Social Action, Family and Gender Promotion	Faustina Fernandes Inglês de Almeida Alves
Minister of Social Communication	José Luis de Matos
Minister of Telecommunications and Information Technologies	José Carvalho da Rocha
Minister of Territory Administration and State Reform	Adão Francisco Correia de Almeida
Minister of Trade	Rui Miguens de Oliveira
Minister of Transport	Ricardo Daniel Sandão Queirós Veigas de Abreu
Minister of Youth and Sports	Rui Luís Falcão Pinto De Andrade
