= 8th Politburo of the People's Movement for the Liberation of Angola =

The 8th Politburo of the People's Movement for the Liberation of Angola (MPLA), officially the Political Bureau of the Central Committee of the MPLA elected at the 8th Congress, was elected at the 1st Plenary Session of the 8th Central Committee on 11 December 2021, and replaced the 7th Politburo that sat from 2019 to 2021.

At its 1st Ordinary Meeting, convened on 14 December 2021, the Politburo elected the 8th Secretariat and the 8th Council of Honor.

Of the 101, 48 are newcomers. Of these 48, 34 of them are women. 50 men and 51 women serve in the 8th Politburo.

== Meetings ==
Plenum	Start–end	Length
1st Ordinary Meeting	14 December 2021	1 day

== Members ==
Rank	Name	7th POL		Gender
Rank	Name	New	Rank	Gender
1	João Manuel Gonçalves Lourenço	Old	1	Male
2	Luísa Pedro Francisco Damião	Old	2	Female
3	Paulo Pombolo	Old	3	Male
4	Adão Francisco Correia de Almeida	Old	4	Male
5	Americo António Cuononoca	Old	8	Male
6	Ana Celeste Cardoso Januário	Old	9	Female
7	Ana Paula do Sacramento Neto	Old	10	Female
8	António Domingos Pitra da Costa Neto	Old	12	Male
9	Bento Joaquim Sebastião Francisco Bento	New	—	Male
10	Bornito de Sousa Baltazar Diogo	Old	13	Male
11	Carlos Maria da Silva Feijó	Old	14	Female
12	Carolina Cerqueira	Old	15	Female
13	Daniel Félix Neto	Old	17	Male
14	Crispiniano Vivaldino E. dos Santos	New	—	Male
15	Dionísio Manuel da Fonseca	Old	19	Male
16	Dolina Nassocopia Miguel Tchinhama	Old	20	Female
17	Emília Carlota Dias	Old	21	Female
18	Ernesto Muangala	Old	22	Male
19	Eugénio César Laborinho	Old	23	Male
20	Fernando da Piedade Dias dos Santos "Nandó"	Old	24	Male
21	Gonçalves Manuel Muandumba	Old	25	Male
22	Irene Alexandra da Silva Neto	Old	27	Female
23	Isaac Francisco Maria dos Anjos	Old	28	Male
24	Joana Domingos dos Santos Filipe Tomás	Old	29	Female
25	Joana Lina Ramos Baptista Cândido	Old	30	Female
26	João de Almeida Azevedo Martins	Old	34	Male
27	João Diogo Gaspar	Old	32	Male
28	João Ernesto dos Santos	Old	33	Male
29	Jorge Inocêncio Dombolo	Old	35	Male
30	José Carvalho da Rocha	Old	36	Male
31	Luís Manuel da Fonseca Nunes	Old	40	Male
32	Manuel Gomes da Conceição Homem	Old	44	Male
33	Manuel José Nunes Júnior	Old	45	Male
34	Manuel Pedro Chaves	Old	46	Male
35	Mara Regina Baptista Quiosa	Old	47	Female
36	Marcos Alexandre Nhunga	Old	48	Male
37	Marcy Cláudio Lopes	Old	49	Male
38	Maria Ângela Teixeira de Alves S. Bragança	Old	50	Female
39	Marie Antoinette Josefina Sabinda	Old	51	Female
40	Maricel Marinho da Silva Capama	Old	—	Female
41	Mário António Sequeira e Carvalho	Old	—	Male
42	Mário Pinto de Andrade	Old	55	Male
43	Norberto Fernandes dos Santos	Old	57	Male
44	Paula Cristina Domingos Francisco Coelho	Old	58	Female
45	Pedro de Morais Neto	Old	59	Male
46	Pedro Makita Armando Júlia	Old	60	Male
47	Pedro Mutindi	Old	61	Male
48	Pedro Sebastião Teta	Old	63	Male
49	Pereira Alfredo	Old	64	Male
50	Rui Luís Falcão Pinto de Andrade	Old	65	Male
51	Sílvia Paula Valentim Lutucuta	Old	68	Female
52	Vera Esperança dos Santos Daves de Sousa	Old	69	Female
53	Bernardo Adriano Tyova	Old	70	Male
54	Virgílio Ferreira de Fontes Pereira	Old	71	Male
55	Loti Nolika	New	—	Female
56	Adriano Mendes de Carvalho	New	—	Male
57	Job Castelo Capapinha	New	—	Male
58	Nuno Mahapi Dala	New	—	Male
59	Gerdina Didalewa	New	—	Female
60	Augusto Archer de Sousa Hose	New	—	Male
61	José Martins	New	—	Male
62	Tete António	New	—	Male
63	Manuel Domingos Augusto	Old	43	Male
64	Aia-Eza Gomes da Silva Troso	New	—	Female
65	Ana Paula Chantre Luna de Carvalho	New	—	Female
66	Angela Maria Botelho de Carvalho Diogo	New	—	Female
67	Angelica Nene Curita Inhungo	New	—	Female
68	Carla Maria Leitão Ribeiro de Sousa	New	—	Female
69	Carmen Ivelize Van-Dúnem do Sacramento Neto dos Santos	New	—	Female
70	Celeste Elavoco David Adolfo	New	—	Female
71	Dalva Maurícia Ringote Allen	New	—	Female
72	Elizabeth Claudina Rufino Chiwissa	New	—	Female
73	Emília da Conceição Panjimba	New	—	Female
74	Esmeralda Bravo Conde da Silva Mendonça	New	—	Female
75	Hope Maria Eduardo Francisco da Costa	New	—	Female
76	Hemingarda João Fernandes	New	—	Female
77	Joaquim António Carlos dos Reis Júnior	New	—	Male
78	Francisco Pereira Furtado	New	—	Male
79	Gildo Matias José	New	—	Male
80	Esteves Carlos Hilário	New	—	Male
81	Eduarda Desihafela Daniel Zacarias	New	—	Female
82	Aniceto da Fonseca Emílio Pedro	New	—	Male
83	Josefina Perpétua Pires Domingos Diakite	New	—	Female
84	Maria Antónia Nelumba	New	—	Female
85	Maria Esperança dos Santos	New	—	Female
86	Maria Idalina Valente	New	—	Female
87	Maria João Francisco Tchipalavela	New	—	Female
88	Narciso Damásio dos Santos Benedito	New	—	Male
89	Leonor da Silva Garibalde	New	—	Female
90	Maria Piedade de Jesus	New	—	Female
91	Maria Fernanda Cavungo	New	—	Female
92	Ruth Mendes	New	—	Female
93	Catarina Pedro Domingos	New	—	Female
94	Deolinda Odia Paulo Satula Vilarinho	New	—	Female
95	Josefina Ndesipewa Gomes	New	—	Female
96	Jamila Huguet da Silva de Almeida Prata	New	—	Female
97	Hope Luzia Jackon Pembele	New	—	Female
98	Evandra Luisa de Jesus Martins Mingas	New	—	Female
99	Helena Berta Buco Vando Marciado	New	—	Female
100	Suzana Augusta de Melo	New	—	Female
101	Luciana Mona Cachiangue	New	—	Female
