= Minister of Agriculture and Forestry (Angola) =

Minister of Agriculture and Fisheries of Angola is a cabinet level position in the national government. The position was established in 1975 with Manuel Pedro Pacavira.

== Name changes ==
- 1975–1991: Minister of Agriculture
- 1992–2016: Minister of Agriculture and Rural Development
- 2017–2020: Minister of Agriculture and Forestry
- 2020–present: Minister of Agriculture and Fisheries

== Ministers of Minister of Agriculture and Fisheries ==
- 1975–1981: Manuel Pedro Pacavira
- 1981–1983: Artur Vidal Gomes Kumbi Diezabu
- 1983–1987: Evaristo Domingos Kimba
- 1987–1991: Fernando Faustino Muteka
- 1991–2002: Isaac Francisco Maria dos Anjos
- 2002–2007: Gilberto Buta Lutucuta
- 2007–2016: Afonso Pedro Canga
- 2016–2019: Marcos Alexandre Nhunga
- 2019–present: António Francisco de Assis
