= Afonso Pedro Canga =

Angolan politician

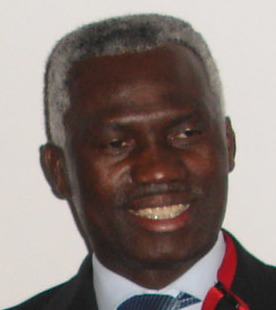
- Canga in 2007

Minister of Agriculture and Forestry
- In office 2007 – September 2016
- President: José Eduardo dos Santos
- Preceded by: Gilberto Buta Lutucuta
- Succeeded by: Marcos Alexandre Nhunga

Personal details
- Born: February 10, 1959 (age 66); Angola

Afonso Pedro Canga (born February 10, 1959) is an Angolan politician who served as the Minister of Agriculture and Forestry between 2007 and 2016.

== Biography ==
While at school, Canga taught Portuguese at the Regional School of the Ministry of Internal Trade. He completed his degree in agronomy and is an agricultural engineer. He has held various roles such as General Director and later the Deputy National Director of the Agrarian Development Institute in Angola's Ministry of Agriculture and Rural Development. He was also an engineer in the country's National Cotton Program. Between 1995 and 1999, he served as Deputy Minister of Agriculture and Rural Development before becoming full Minister in 2007. He was replaced by President dos Santos in 2016.
