= Antônio Carlos =

Antônio Carlos may refer to:

- Antônio Carlos Gomes (1836−96), Brazilian composer
- Antônio Carlos (footballer, born 1964), Antônio Carlos Santos, Brazilian footballer
- Antônio Carlos Zago (born 1969), Brazilian footballer
- Antônio Carlos (footballer, born 1949), Antônio Carlos Alves Carneiro, Brazilian football winger
- Antônio Carlos (footballer, born 1979) (fl. 2003–2015), Brazilian footballer active in Vietnam, see V.League 1
- António Carlos (footballer, born 1979), Brazilian footballer who played in Switzerland
- Antônio Carlos (footballer, born 1983) (born 1983), played for Fluminense, Atlético Paranaense and São Paulo
- Antônio Carlos Júnior (born 1990), Brazilian mixed martial artist
- Antônio Carlos (footballer, born 1993) (born 1993), Brazilian footballer
- Antônio Carlos (footballer, born 1994) (born 1994), Brazilian footballer

== Places ==
- Antônio Carlos, Minas Gerais
- Antônio Carlos, Santa Catarina

== See also ==
- Carlos Antonio (disambiguation)
