= Minister of Territory Administration and State Reform (Angola) =

Minister of Territory Administration and State Reform of Angola is a cabinet level position in the national government. The position was established in 1991 with Lopo Fortunato Ferreira do Nascimento.

== Name changes ==
- 1991–2017: Minister of Territory Administration
- 2017–present: Minister of Territory Administration and State Reform

== Ministers of Territory Administration and State Reform ==
- 1991–1992: Lopo Fortunato Ferreira do Nascimento
- 1992–1994: António Paulo Kassoma
- 1994–1997: José Aníbal Lopes Rocha
- 2002–2004: Fernando Faustino Muteka
- 2004–2010: Virgílio Ferreira de Fontes Pereira
- 2010–2017: Bornito de Sousa Baltazar Diogo
- 2017–present: Adão Francisco Correia de Almeida
