= Carlos Antônio =

Carlos Antônio may refer to:

- Carlos Antônio (footballer, born 1989), Brazilian football defensive midfielder
- Carlos Antônio (footballer, born 1990), Brazilian football striker

== See also ==
- Carlos Antonio
