= Minister of Social Action, Family and Gender Promotion (Angola) =

Government position in Angola

Minister of Social Action, Family and Gender Promotion of Angola is a cabinet level position in the national government of Angola. The position was established in 2002 with Cândida Celeste da Silva.

== Ministers of Social Action, Family and Gender Promotion ==
- 2002–2010: Cândida Celeste da Silva
- 2010–2012: Genoveva da Conceição Lino
- 2012–2017: Maria Filomena de Fátima Lobão Telo Delgado
- 2017–2019: Victória Francisco Correia da Conceição
- 2019–present: Faustina Fernandes Inglês de Almeida Alves
