= 8th Secretariat of the People's Movement for the Liberation of Angola =

The 8th Secretariat of the People's Movement for the Liberation of Angola (MPLA), officially the 8th Secretariat of the Political Bureau of the MPLA Central Committee, was elected at the 1st Ordinary Meeting of the 8th Politburo on 14 December 2021.

== Members ==
Rank	Name	7th SEC		Title	Gender
Rank	Name	New	Rank	Title	Gender
1	João Manuel Gonçalves Lourenço	Old	1	MPLA President	Male
2	Luísa Pedro Francisco Damião	Old	1	MPLA Vice President	Female
3	Paulo Pombolo	Old	1	MPLA General Secretary	Male
4	Jorge Inocêncio Dombolo	Old	1	Secretary of Organisation and Societal Insertion	Male
5	Maria Idalina Valente	Old	1	Secretary of Economic Policy	Female
6	Maricel Marinho da Silva Capama	Old	1	Secretary of Social Policy	Female
7	Mário Pinto de Andrade	Old	1	Secretary of State Reform, Public Administration and Municipalities	Male
8	Rui Luís Falcão Pinto de Andrade	Old	1	Secretary of Information and Propaganda	Male
9	João de Almeida Azevedo Martins	Old	1	Secretary of Political and Electoral Affairs	Male
10	Manuel Domingos Augusto	Old	1	Secretary of International Relations	Male
11	Maria Ângela Teixeira de Alves S. Bragança	Old	1	Secretary of Staff Policy	Female
12	Pedro de Morais Neto	Old	1	Secretary of Former Combatants and Veterans of the Homeland	Male
13	Carla Maria Leitão Ribeiro de Sousa	Old	1	Secretary of Administration and Finance	Female
14	Virgílio Ferreira de Fontes Pereira	Old	1	President of the MPLA Parliamentary Group	Male
15	Marie Antoinette Baptista	Old	1	Coordinator of the Discipline and Audit Committee	Female
16	Joana Domingos dos Santos Filipe Tomás	Old	1	General Secretary of the Organisation of Angolan Women	Female
17	Crispiniano Vivaldino E. dos Santos	Old	1	First National Secretary of the Youth of MPLA	Male
