= Carlos Antonio =

Carlos Antonio (or António) is an Italian, Spanish, and Portuguese name. Carlos Antonio may refer to:

== Sport ==
- Carlos Aguiar (born Carlos Antonio Aguiar Burgos), Uruguayan former footballer
- Carlos Ascues (born Carlos Antonio Ascues Ávila), Peruvian professional footballer
- Carlos Gutiérrez Barriga (born Carlos Antonio Gutiérrez Barriga), Mexican former footballer
- Carlinhos (born Carlos Antonio de Souza Júnior), Brazilian professional football player
- Carlos Castro Caputo (born Carlos Antonio Castro Caputo), Spanish retired footballer
- Carlos Cañizales (born Carlos Antonio Cañizales), Venezuelan professional boxer
- Carlos Muñoz Cobo (born Carlos Antonio Muñoz Cobo), known simply as Carlos, is a Spanish retired footballer who played as a striker.
- Carlos Diaz (pitcher), (born Carlos Antonio Diaz; 1958 – 2015), American Major League Baseball relief pitcher
- Carlos Dinis (born Carlos António Dinis), Angolan basketball head coach
- Carlos Antônio Ferreira de Sousa, Brazilian footballer
- Carlos López Cortéz (born Carlos Antonio López Cortéz) is a Mexican footballer
- Carlos Gomes (footballer, born 1932), (born Carlos António do Carmo Costa Gomes; 1932 - 2005) Portuguese footballer
- Carlos Huerta (born Carlos Antonio Huerta), American former college and professional football player
- Carlos Antonio Meléndez, retired Salvadoran football (soccer) player
- Carlos Antonio Mereles, Paraguayan footballer
- Carlos Muñoz (Ecuadorian footballer) (born Carlos Antonio Muñoz Martínez; 1964 – 1993) Ecuadorian football
- Carlo Piccio (born Juan Carlos Antonio Piccio), Filipino former swimmer
- Carlos Ponce (baseball) (born Carlos Antonio Ponce Diaz), Puerto Rican former Major League Baseball first baseman
- Carlos Antônio Ribeiro de Oliveira, Brazilian striker.
- Carlos Rodón (born Carlos Antonio Rodón), American professional baseball pitcher for the Chicago White Sox of Major League Baseball (MLB).
- Carlos Toro (born Carlos Antonio Toro Coronado), Chilean football goalkeeper
- Carlos Padilla Velásquez (born Carlos Antonio Padilla Velásquez; 1934 – 2014), Honduran footballer
- Carlos Salom (born Carlos Antonio Salom Zulema), Argentine-born Palestinian footballer.
- Carlos Simões (born Carlos António Fonseca Simőes), former Portuguese footballer
- Carlos Suárez (boxer) (born Carlos Antonio Suárez AKA The Magician), American born Trinidadian boxer who competed at the 2012 Summer Olympics

== Politics ==
- Carlos Herrera Araluce (born Carlos Antonio Herrera Araluce) Mexican politician
- Carlos Bettini (born Carlos Antonio Bautista Bettini Francese), Argentinian businessman, politician, and diplomat who was the Argentinian ambassador to Spain and Andorra
- Carlos Antonio Carrillo (1783–1852), Governor of Alta California from 1837 to 1838.
- Carlos Romero Barceló (born Carlos Antonio Romero Barceló), the fifth Governor of Puerto Rico
- Carlos António Fernandes, Angolan minister for transport from 1987 to 1990.
- Carlos Antonio López (1792–1862), president of Paraguay from 1841 to 1862.
- Carlos Antonio Mendoza (1856–1916), Panamanian politician
- Carlos Romero Deschamps (born Carlos Antonio Romero Deschamps), Mexican politician affiliated with the PRI
- Carlos Antonio (Zambian politician), see List of members of the National Assembly of Zambia (2011–16)

== Others ==
- Carlos Castro (journalist) (born Carlos António Castro; 1945–2011), Portuguese television personality and journalist
- Carlos Chávez (born Carlos Antonio de Padua Chávez y Ramírez; 1899–1978), Mexican composer, conductor,
- Carlos Antonio Lozada (born 1961), former Colombian guerrilla member of the Revolutionary Armed Forces of Colombia (FARC).
- Carlos Antonio López, Paraguay, district in the Itapúa Department of Paraguay.
- Carlos Antônio Napion (1757–1814), engineer and general in the Portuguese army in Brazil
- Anthony Pini (born Carlos Antonio Pini; 1902–1989), Argentinian cellist, soloist, orchestral section leader and chamber musician
- Carlos A. Santos-Viola (1912–1994), architect in the Philippines.
