= Joana Lina =

Angolan politician (born 1957)

Deputy of the Politburo of the Angolan National Assembly
- In office 26 October 1992 – 15 September 2022

Governor of Luanda Province
- In office 2020–2021
- Preceded by: Sérgio Luther Rescova Joaquim
- Succeeded by: Ana Paula de Carvalho; Manuel Homem

Governor of Huambo Province
- In office 2018–2020
- Preceded by: João Baptista Kussumua
- Succeeded by: Lotti Nolika

Minister of Family and Promotion of Women of Angola
- In office 1991–1997

Personal details
- Born: Joana Lina Ramos Baptista Cândido; 22 September 1957 (age 69) Camabatela, Cuanza Norte, Portuguese Angola (now Angola)
- Party: MPLA
- Education: Agostinho Neto University (BA, MA)
- Occupation: Economist, politician

Joana Lina Ramos Baptista Cândido (born 22 September 1957) is an Angolan economist and politician. She is affiliated with the People's Movement for the Liberation of Angola (MPLA). She was a deputy for the party in the National Circle of the National Assembly from 1992 to 2022.

== Biography ==
Lina was born on 22 September 1957 in Camabatela, in the province of Cuanza Norte. She is the daughter of José Coimbra Baptista and Alexandrina Rodrigues Ramos da Cruz Baptista. From 1964 to 1968, she studied primary school at the Escola Primária de Camabatela.

During her childhood, she resided in N'dalatando. During this period, from 1969 to 1974, she began her secondary school and lycée at Liceu Adriano Moreira de Nadalatando. Before moving to Luanda, where Lina joined the MPLA in 1974, she went to work as a voluntary coordinator in literacy for the party in Cuanza Norte. In Luanda, she also became a militant with the Organization of Angolan Women (OMA). While in Luanda as well, she attended complimentary courses at Paulo Dias de Novais and Salvador Correia (now Magistério Mutu-ya-Kevela) from 1976 to 1978. She studied economics from 1978 to 1982 at the Economic School of Agostinho Neto University. Many years later, in 2013, she completed a master's degree in the economic politics of development from the same university.

=== Political career ===
In an independent Angola, Lina began to work at the MPLA's headquarters as a secretary of the Central Committee's cabinet for Economic Development and Planning, being under the lead of President José Eduardo dos Santos. With a change in the designation of the Department for Economic and Social Policies (DPES), she came to be the director in 1983, with Roberto Francisco de Almeida already as Secretary of the Central Committee of DPES, to whom she responded. She later became a member of OMA's National Committee during this time period.

From 1991 to 1997, Lina was the Secretary of State and Women's Promotion and Development, being the Minister of Family and Promotion of Women during the Unity and National Reconciliation government.

Simultaneously, in 1992, she was elected as a deputy from the MPLA for the National Assembly, becoming, soon after she began, the President of the Economic and Finances Commission, in the country's first multi-party legislature. After her time as minister, Lina returned to work in the internal party structure of the MPLA, with her returning to be the director of DPES. However, in the party congress of 2003, she was nominated to be the Secretary of Administration and Finances of the MPLA. She was reelected deputy in 2008, going on to serve as the 2nd vice-president of the National Assembly and, from 2012 to 2017, as the 1st vice-president of the National Assembly.

Starting in 1996, she became a member of the Angolan Football Federation (FAF), the Angolan Olympic Committee, the Angolan Paralympic Committee, and the Committee of Rural Women, along with having presided over the floor of the Assembly of the Economist Association. She founded Fundo Lwini, where she is part of the administration's council, along with having the same functions with Banco SOL. Lina was reelected deputy in 2017. From 2018 to 2020, she was the governor of the province of Huambo, later moving on to become the governor of the province of Luanda from 2020 to 2021.

She was written into position 100 on the MPLA's list for the 8th Politburo of the People's Movement for the Liberation of Angola in the 2022 Angolan general election. Only 67 party candidates were elected to the national circuit and thus, after many years in parliament, Lina became a substitute and thus was not seated for that session of Congress.
