= Minister of Public Administration, Labour and Social Security (Angola) =

Minister of Public Administration, Labour and Social Security of Angola is a cabinet level position in the national government. The position was established in 1980 with Noé da Silva Saúde.

== Name changes ==
- 1975–1991: Minister of Labour and Social Security
- 1991–present: Minister of Public Administration, Labour and Social Security

== Ministers of Public Administration, Labour and Social Security ==
- –1980: Noé da Silva Saúde
- 1980–1986: Horácio Pereira Braz da Silva
- 1986–1991: Diogo Jorge de Jesus
- 1992–2017: António Domingos Pitra Costa Neto
- 2017–2017: António Rodrigues Afonso Paulo
- 2017–present: Jesus Faria Maiato
