= Ministry of Science and Technology (Angola) =

Government ministry of Angola

Ministry of Science and Technology MINCT
- Ministério da Ciência e Tecnologia

Ministry overview
- Formed: May 9, 2014
- Type: Ministry
- Jurisdiction: Government of Angola
- Headquarters: Luanda
- Ministry executive: Maria Cândida Teixeira, Minister of Science and Technology
- Website: minct.gov.ao

The Ministry of Science and Technology (Portuguese: Ministério da Ciência e Tecnologia, MINCT) is a cabinet-level ministry of the government of Angola. The mission of the ministry is to "Propose and coordinate the implementation of policies in the field of Science, Technology and Innovation, as well as their modes of organization, operation and evaluation." The current Minister of Science and Technology is Maria Cândida Teixeira.

== Establishment ==
=== 1997 ===
The ministry was established in 1997 as the Ministry of Science and Technology (Portuguese: Ministério da Ciência e Tecnologia, MINCIT). Its mission and structure are outlined in Estatuto Orgânico do Ministério da Ciência e Tecnologia: Decreto-Lei 15/99 of 1999, and further clarified under Decreto n. 2/2008, de 28 de fevereiro, do Conselho de Ministros; and Presidential Decree no. 70/70 of 2009.

=== 2010 ===
In February 2010 the Ministry of Science and Technology (MINCIT) merged with the Secretary of State for Higher Education (Portuguese: Secretaria de Estado do Ensino Superior, SEES) to form the Ministry of Higher Education, Science and Technology (Portuguese: Ministério do Ensino Superior, Ciência e Tecnologia, MESCT). The merger was outlined in Presidential Decree No 70/10, 19 May 2010.

=== 2012 ===
The Ministry of Higher Education and Science and Technology was split into two ministries in 2012. The Ministry of Science and Technology reverted to its original name in both Portuguese and English, but now uses the acronym MINCT. The Ministry of Higher Education (Portuguese: Ministério do Ensino Superior) is known by the acronym ES. The split was outlined in Presidential Decree no. 233/12 of December 4, 2012.

=== 2017 ===
Following the 2017 Angolan general election and subsequent cabinet reshuffle, the Ministry of Science and Technology was again merged with the Ministry of Higher Education to form a new ministry, with the new name Ministry of Higher Education, Science, Technology and Innovation (Portuguese: Ministério do Ensino Superior, Ciência, Tecnologia e Inovação) under the initialism MESCTI.

== Location ==
At the time of its establishment, the headquarters of the Ministry of Science and Technology were located on Avenida Lenine to the southwest of Largo Lenine in the Ingombota district of Luanda. It was relocated to a joint government administration building on the newly named Rua da MAT (Rua da Ministério da Administração do Território), "Complexo Administrativo "Clássicos do Talatona", in the district of Luanda Sul in 2014. The ministry is located in Building 3 of the complex.

== Organizational structure ==
Section 2, Article 3 of the Estatuto Orgânico do Ministério do Ensino Superior e da Ciência e Tecnologia outlines the organizational structure of the ministry. It provides for five national directorates and eight institutes and centers.

=== Directorates ===
- National Directorate of Development and Expansion of Higher Education
- National Directorate of Advanced Training
- National Directorate of Vocational Guidance and Student Support
- National Directorate of Scientific Research
- National Directorate of Technological Development and Innovation

=== Institutes and centers ===
- National Institute of Scholarships
- National Institute for Assessment and Accreditation of Higher Education
- National Center for Scientific Research (Angola)
- National Technology Center (Angola)
- National Fund for Scientific and Technological Development
- National Institute Accreditation Regulator and Technology Transfer
- National Institute of Traditional Knowledge
- National Center for Catchment and Satellite Image Processing
