= Minister of Education (Angola) =

Minister of Education of Angola is a cabinet level position in the national government. The position was established in 1975 with Ambrósio Lukoki.

== Name changes ==
- 1975–2002: Minister of Education and Culture
- 2002–present: Minister of Education

== Ministers of Education ==
- 1975–1981: Ambrósio Lukoki
- 1981–1991: Augusto Lopes Teixeira
- 1991–1992: António Burity da Silva Neto
- 1992–1996: João Manuel Bernardo
- 1996–2010: António Burity da Silva Neto
- 2010–2017: Mpinda Simão
- 2017–present: Maria Cândida Pereira Teixeira
