= Apiacá (disambiguation) =

The Apiacá are an indigenous people of Brazil.

Apiacá or Apiacás may also refer to:

- Apiacá language, the language of the Apiacá people
- Apiacá, Espírito Santo, a municipality in Espírito Santo, Brazil
- Apiacá River, in Mato Grosso, Brazil
- Apiacás, a municipality in Mato Grosso, Brazil
- Apiacás Ecological Reserve, a state ecological reserve in Mato Grosso, Brazil
