= Manuel Bernardo de Sousa =

Angolan politician

Minister of Transports
- In office 1983–1987
- Preceded by: Fernando Faustino Muteka
- Succeeded by: Carlos António Fernandes

Ambassador of Angola to Yugoslavia
- In office 1987–1989
- Preceded by: Adolfo João Pedro
- Succeeded by: Evaristo Domingos Kimba

Ambassador of Angola to the U.S.S.R./Russian Federation
- In office 1989–1993
- Preceded by: J. César Augusto Kiluanji
- Succeeded by: Luís Doukoui de Castro,

Ambassador of Angola to China
- In office 1993–2002
- Succeeded by: João Manuel Bernardo

Personal details
- Born: 1 August 1931
- Died: 20 June 2013 (aged 81)
- Party: MPLA

Manuel Bernardo de Sousa (1 August 1931 – 20 June 2013) was an Angolan diplomat and minister of Transport from 1983 to 1987.
