= Maria Filomena de Fátima Lobão Telo Delgado =

Angolan diplomat

Angolan Ambassador to Switzerland
- Incumbent
- Assumed office 2023

Personal details
- Born: Huambo, Angola
- Party: MPLA
- Education: University of Calabar

Maria Filomena de Fátima Lobão Telo Delgado is the Angolan Ambassador to Switzerland.

== Career ==
Maria Filomena de Fátima Lobão Telo Delgado was born in Huambo and attended the Sarmento Rodrigues Industrial and Commercial School there. Delgado attended the University of Calabar in Nigeria where she was awarded a degree in sociology. She is a member of the MPLA and its women's affiliate the Organization of Angolan Women (OMA). Delgado held many positions with OMA including deputy regional secretary for southern Africa; head of the office for studies and projects and director of the general secretariat. She remains a member of OMA National Committee and the Discipline and Audit Committee as well as its Coordinator for Bengo Province.

Delgado was a member of Angola's Rural Women's Committee and on the board of directors of the African Humanitarian Association. She is also a member of the MPLA committee of psychologists and sociologists.

Delgado was a deputy minister in the Cabinet of Angola Ministry for Family and the Promotion of Women before she transferred to the Ministry of Agriculture and Rural Development in the same role. She was promoted to Secretary of State in October 2008. Since at least March 2016 she had returned to the Ministry for Family and the Promotion of Women as Secretary of State.

In June 2023, Delgado became Ambassador to Switzerland. She previously served as Angola's ambassador to South Africa.
