= Ministry of Youth and Sports (Angola) =

Government ministry of Angola

- Ministério da Juventude e Desportos

Agency overview
- Jurisdiction: Government of Angola
- Minister responsible: Gonçalves Muandumba, Minister of Youth and Sports
- Child agencies: (etc.)
- Website: http://www.minjud.gv.ao/

The Ministry of Youth and Sports (Portuguese: Ministério da Juventude e Desportos) is an Angolan government ministry.
