= Pitra Neto =

Angolan politician (born 1958)

Minister of Public Administration, Labour and Social Security
- In office 1992–2017
- Preceded by: Diogo Jorge de Jesus
- Succeeded by: António R. Afonso Paulo

Personal details
- Born: 12 February 1958 (age 68)
- Party: MPLA
- Occupation: Lawyer, professor

António Domingos Pitra Costa Neto (born 12 February 1958) is an Angolan politician, professor and lawyer. Neto joined the Popular Movement for the Liberation of Angola (MPLA) in 1974. He has been a member of the MPLA's central committee since 1998. Since joining the party Neto has been involved in the legal system, both in the civilian and military systems as well as assistant lecturer in law. In 1991 Neto was involved in the negotiations that preceded the Bicesse Accords, which temporarily ended the Angolan civil war. Since 1992, Neto has been the Minister of Public Administration, Employment and Social Security.

Neto was the third candidate on the MPLA's national list in the September 2008 parliamentary election. He won a seat in this election, in which MPLA won an overwhelming majority in the National Assembly.
