= Martim Francisco Ribeiro de Andrada =

Brazilian politician (1775–1844)

Martim Francisco de Andrada
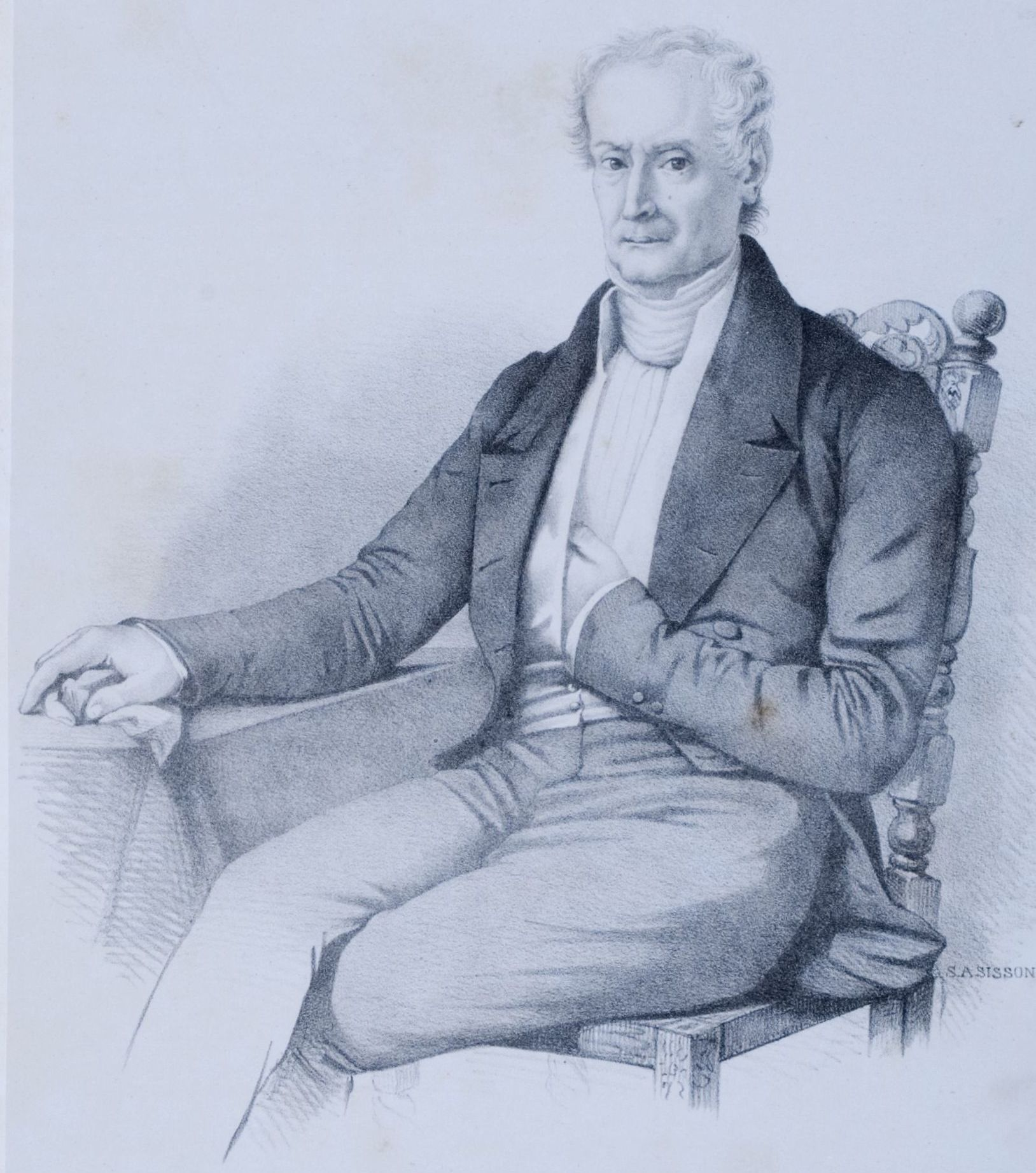
- Lithography by S. A. Sisson.

Minister of Finance
- In office 7 September 1822 – 17 July 1823
- Monarch: Pedro I
- Preceded by: Office established
- Succeeded by: Marquis of Baependi
- In office 24 July 1840 – 23 March 1841
- Monarch: Pedro II
- Preceded by: José da Silva Maia
- Succeeded by: Marquis of Abrantes

Personal details
- Born: 9 April 1775 Santos, São Paulo, State of Brazil
- Died: 23 February 1844 (aged 68) Santos, São Paulo, Empire of Brazil
- Occupation: Politician

Martim Francisco Ribeiro de Andrada (9 April 1775 – 23 February 1844) was a Brazilian politician who played a leading role in the declaration of Brazil's independence and in the government the following years. He was twice Minister of Finance.

== Early years ==
Martim Francisco Ribeiro de Andrada was born in Santos, São Paulo on 9 April 1775. At the time Santos was just a village. His parents were Colonel José Bonifácio Ribeiro de Andrada and Maria Bárbara da Silva. His brothers were Antônio Carlos and José Bonifácio de Andrada. He attended the University of Coimbra in Portugal, where he received degrees in philosophy (1797) and mathematics (1798). He earned a PhD in Natural Sciences. At the university he worked with the friar José Mariano de Conceição Vellozo, a naturalist, in translating works on mineralogy and agriculture.

After returning to Brazil, Ribeiro de Andrada was appointed inspector general of mines in São Paulo state. He traveled extensively in São Paulo in this role, making and recording many scientific findings. In this he was accompanied by his brother José Bonifácio and Lieutenant General Carlos Antônio Napion. In 1820 he and his brother made a tour of the province of São Paulo to find gold deposits. The same year he was appointed secretary and vice president of the provisional government of the province of São Paulo. After the decree of 29 September 1821 had been issued, aiming at again making Brazil a colony of Portugal, he and his brother José Bonifácio contributed to a patriotic proclamation on 24 December 1821.

In January 1822 Martim's brother José was in the Court of Rio de Janeiro, then the principal city of Brazil, involved in the public administration and promoting independence. The Portuguese loyalists still dominated, but ill-judged acts of the court had started to create discontent. In the province of São Paulo General João Carlos managed to stamp out moves towards constitutional freedom. Martim was dismissed from the provisional government of São Paulo and sent as a prisoner to the Court of Rio de Janeiro.

== First cabinet of the Empire ==
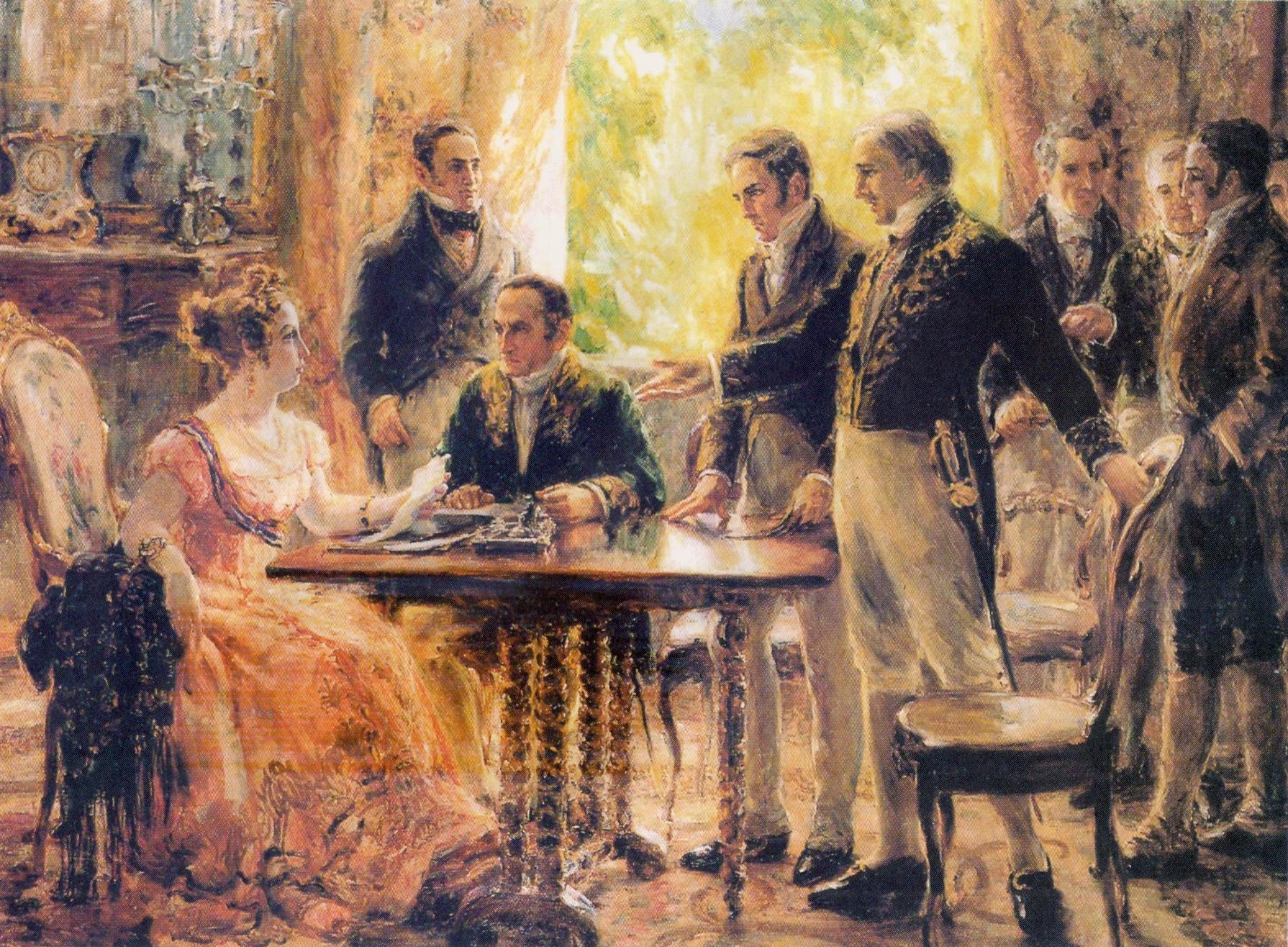
Sessão do Conselho de Estado, depicting Archduchess Maria Leopoldina of Austria, acting as regent during the 2 September 1822 meeting where it was decided to support the independence of Brazil. Martim Ribeiro de Andrada is seated to her left and his brother José is standing and gesturing towards the Empress.

Martim was appointed Secretary of State of Business and Finance from 4 July 1822 to 28 October 1822 in the first cabinet of the Empire of Brazil. Martim was dismissed on 28 October 1822 and reinstated as Minister of Finance on 30 October 1822. His brother José Bonifácio was restored as premier with the mandate of centralizing the union and preventing disorders. This first ministry was marked by a power struggle between José Bonifácio Ribeiro de Andrada and the Freemason group led by Joaquim Gonçalves Lêdo. Martim found that the Treasury of the new Empire of Brazil had no money, since King John VI had taken everything of value back to Portugal when he left the country.

Martim Ribeiro de Andrada followed a nationalist policy in which he taxed imports, particularly from Portugal. On 30 December 1822 he signed a decree imposing a 24% duty on foreign manufactures other than those from England. Although the state was short of funds after the struggle for independence, Ribeiro de Andrada refused to resort to foreign loans, which he distrusted. Instead he established a ten-year compulsory loan secured by the income from the state of Rio de Janeiro, an unusual measure at the time. He obtained popular support by promising to transform Brazil from a land of slavery to one of freedom. He reorganized the tax system and by decree of 4 February 1823 created the administration to oversee taxes on products such as coffee and tobacco.

== Opposition and exile ==
The energy of the Andrada brothers in this turbulent time made them enemies, and the first ministry fell on 17 July 1823. Out of power, the Andradas became strong voices of the opposition. Martim Ribeiro de Andrada was elected for the province of Rio de Janeiro to the General Constituent and Legislative Assembly of the Empire of Brazil. He was a strong and sometimes passionate speaker. He was chairman of the Assembly for the month of October 1823.

On 12 November 1823 the Emperor dissolved the Assembly in an event known as the "Night of Agony". The three Andrada brothers and other former deputies were arrested and imprisoned until 20 November, when they and their families embarked for Le Havre, France as exiles. In his absence, Martim Francisco and Antônio Carlos Ribeiro de Andrada were accused of sedition. In 1828 the court began the trial that would lead to their acquittal of the sedition charge. The two returned to Rio de Janeiro, where they were imprisoned on the Ilha das Cobras. On 6 September 1828 they were absolved of the charges and freed from prison. (Note: Antônio Carlos and Martim Francisco were more liberal than their elder brother José Bonifácio. José Bonifácio was allowed to return to Brazil in July 1829. He served as deputy for Bahia, then as tutor to the young Emperor Pedro II of Brazil. In 1833 he was arrested and imprisoned on Paquetá Island in Guanabara Bay. José Bonifácio died in 1838.)

== Return to power ==
In 1830 Martim Ribeiro de Andrada declined to become a counselor to the Emperor, who was struggling to maintain his position. (Note: On 7 April 1831 the Emperor Pedro I abdicated in favor of his five-year-old son Pedro II, and left Brazil for Europe. A period of political confusion followed with a weak regency unable to maintain order in often violent disputes between rival factions.) He was elected deputy for the province of Minas Gerais for the term 5 May 1830 to 10 June 1833. He was President of the Chamber of Deputies from 4 May 1831 to 2 July 1831. He was a deputy for São Paulo from 3 May 1836 to 18 October 1841. Ribeiro de Andrada represented his home town of Santos in the Assembly.

On 23 July 1840 the Empire of Brazil was restored after a period of anarchy and minority rule. Martim Francisco and Antônio Carlos Ribeiro de Andrada were appointed to the Council of the Crown by the Emperor Pedro II of Brazil. Martim was Secretary and Minister of State for the Finance Department in the first Cabinet of the 2nd Empire, from 24 August 1840 to 23 March 1841. The country was in financial difficulties, but he was confident that it would recover and called for foreign loans to cover the deficit. Martim Ribeiro de Andrada was again President of the Chamber of Deputies from 25 April 1842 to 2 January 1843. He was a counselor to the Emperor and a member of the Brazilian Historical and Geographical Institute.

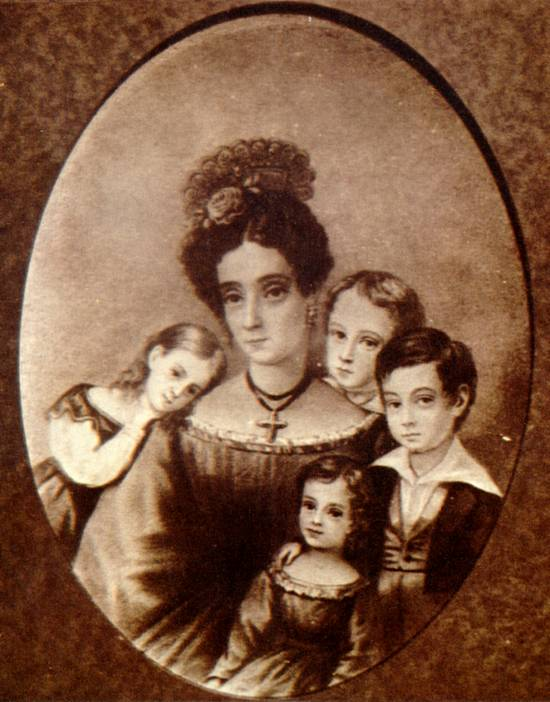
Gabriela Frederica Ribeiro de Andrada and children

Martim Francisco Ribeiro de Andrade died in Santos on 23 February 1844 aged 68. A Brazilian biography of 1861 said his name would live in the memory of his grateful homeland as long as civic virtue is honored and patriotism deserves worship. "He was one of the most devoted apostles of our freedoms, one of the great workers for our independence."

== Family ==
Ribeiro de Andrade married his niece Gabriela Frederica, daughter of Jose Bonifacio de Andrada e Silva, in Santos on 15 November 1820. They had three sons. Martim Francisco Ribeiro de Andrada II (born 1825) was deputy for São Paulo, Minister of Foreign Affairs (1866) and president of the Chamber of Deputies during the Second Empire (1882). José Bonifácio the Younger (born 1827) was a writer, senator of the Empire of Brazil and Minister of the Navy of Brazil. Antônio Carlos Ribeiro de Andrada (born 1836) was deputy for Minas Gerais in the House (1885) and Senator of the Constituent State (1891). Their two daughters were Maria Flora de Andrada and Narcisa de Andrada.

== Bibliography ==
- Ribeiro de Andrada, Martim Francisco (1847). Diário de uma Viagem Mineralógica pela Província de S. Paulo no Anno de 1805. Vol. 9. Instituto Histórico e Geográfico Brasileiro. pp. 527–548.
