= Sessão do Conselho de Estado =

1922 painting by Georgina de Albuquerque

- Sessão do Conselho de Estado que Decidiu a Independência
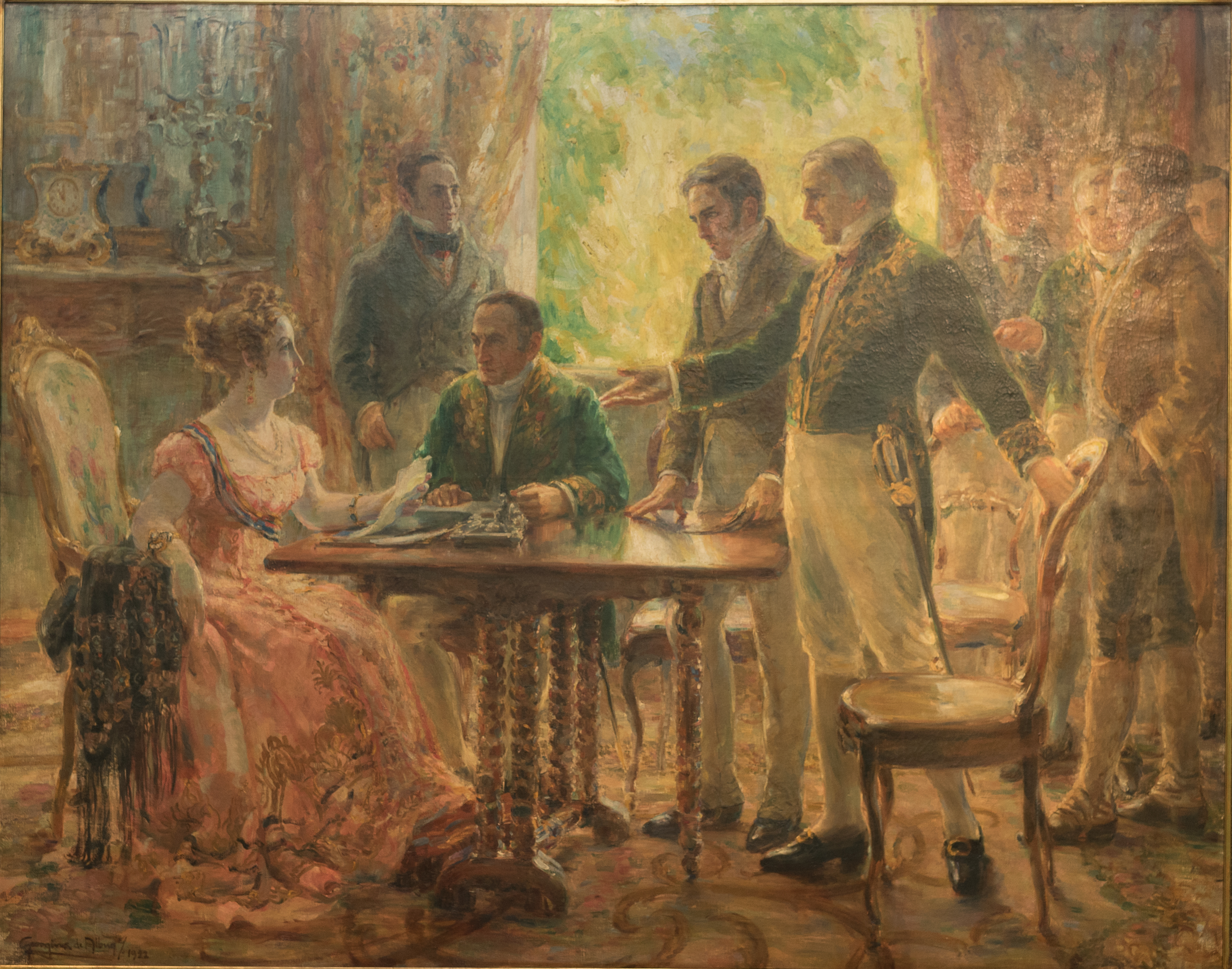
- Artist: Georgina de Albuquerque
- Year: 1922
- Medium: oil paint, canvas
- Dimensions: 236 cm (93 in) × 293 cm (115 in)
- Location: National Historical Museum, Brazil
- Accession: 6197

Sessão do Conselho de Estado (Session of the State Council) is an artwork of the genre historical painting made by Georgina de Albuquerque in 1922. It portrays the session that took place on 2 September 1822 of the State Council of Brazil, preceding Brazilian independence. The artwork is part of the collection on exhibition at the National Historical Museum of Brazil, in the city of Rio de Janeiro.

The painting is notable for two reasons. It's a work of Brazilian academic art painted by a Brazilian woman at a time when the genre was dominated by men. It also depicts a gender perspective of Brazilian independence, insofar as it highlights the participation of the then princess Maria Leopoldina in the political process of colonial rupture in 1822.

Albuquerque won the prize of the Contemporary and Retrospective Art Exhibition for the Centenary of Independence, a competition held on the centenary of Brazilian independence. The goal of the competition was to select paintings that best depict historical events linked to Brazilian independence. The prize was the purchase of a painting by the federal government, which would then form part of the collection of the Escola Nacional de Belas Artes (National School of Fine Arts). The painting was donated by the school to the National Historical Museum.

== Description ==
The painting by Georgina de Albuquerque was made with oil on canvas. Its measurements are: 210 centimetres (83 in) tall by 265 centimetres (104 in) wide. The predominant colours are orange, pink and yellow. It has been emphasised that in the painting, there is "life" and "movement". In the background, there is a direct light, coming from a window, possibly opening to a park; that light contributes to creating a "warm" and "pleasant" tone within the painting. The brushstrokes are strong and ill-defined.

The central object in the painting is a table with a square top. It's a well-crafted object, with three sculpted legs and rounded feet. In addition to the table, there are chairs and a console table, over which there is a candelabrum and a clock showing 11 o'clock.

The focal point of the painting is Maria Leopoldina, in a meeting with the Council of the Attorneys-general of the Provinces of Brazil, in the Paço Imperial, in the city of Rio de Janeiro. She is shown in profile, sitting on a chair with a flower motif, on the left corner. Her left arm is resting on the table, holding paper pages, while the other arm is on the chair armrest. The papers held by the princess are orders from the Portuguese Cortes to Dom Pedro, commanding him to return to Portugal. In the scene, the princess is portrayed as a political deal-maker (Portuguese: "articuladora política"):

The way she portrays Maria Leopoldina should also be highlighted: she isn't at the centre, with a sword, with men below (or people, if preferred), as she is shown in allegorical paintings or in those where the hero was a man. That heroine is serene (contradicting the notion of the woman as a being without control of her passions); she doesn't put herself above the men (but they praise her, even though they stand at a higher ground); she doesn't make war, but prepares for it; she doesn't make "the cry", but engenders it; her strength is intellectual.

— Ana Paula Cavalcanti Simioni,

Present in the meeting are José Bonifácio de Andrada e Silva, the Patriarch of the Independence, with whom Maria Leopoldina interacts, and Martim Francisco Ribeiro de Andrada, sitting. Joaquim Gonçalves Ledo is standing beside the Patriarch of the Independence with his hands on the table. Behind Martim Francisco, stands José Clemente Pereira. Behind José Bonifácio, are Caetano Pinto de Miranda Montenegro, Manoel Antônio Farinha, Lucas José Obes and Luiz Pereira da Nóbrega. The councilmen are in uniform, with light-coloured pants and green dress coats. The meeting is held in the absence of Dom Pedro, who is in a trip to São Paulo.

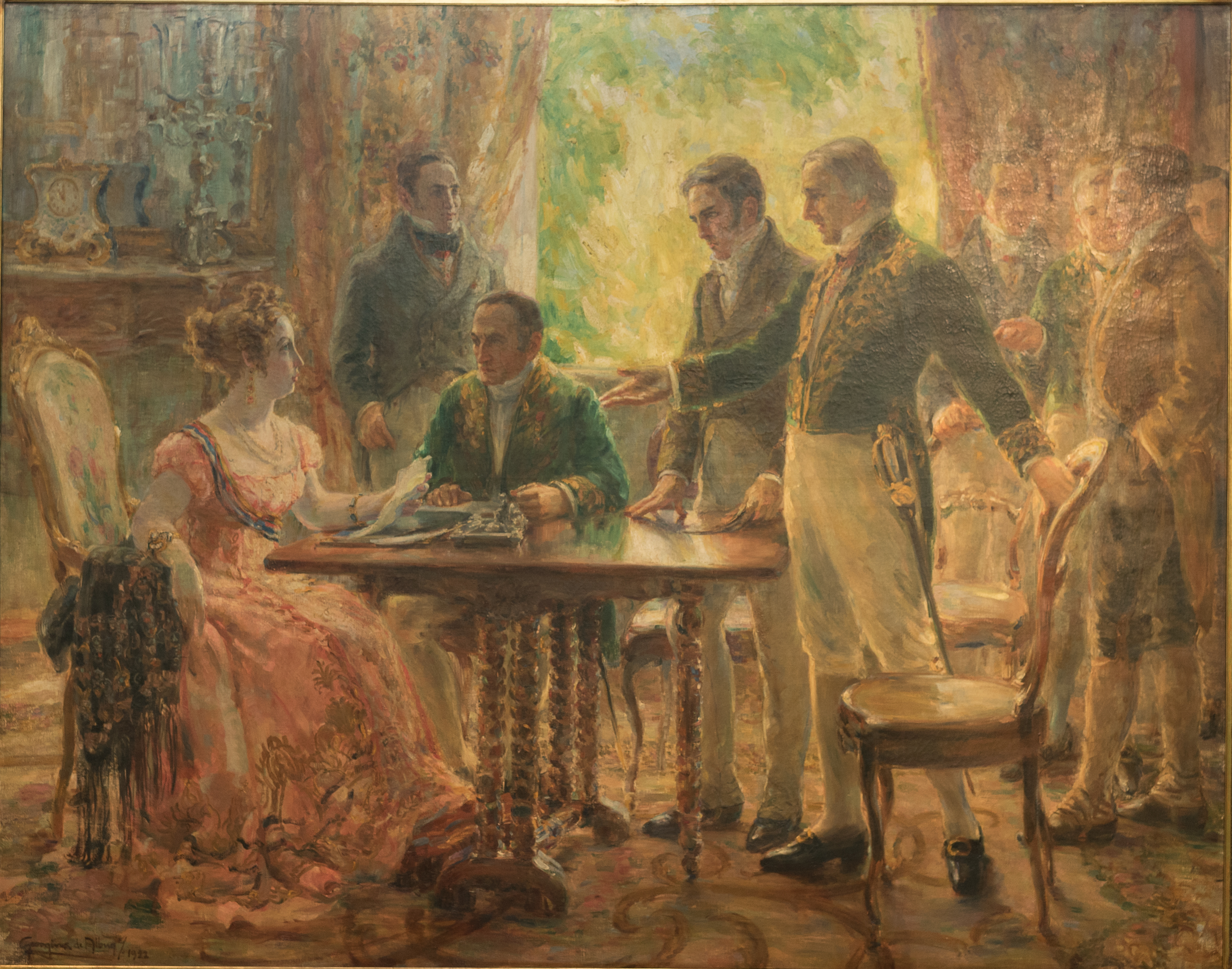
Clickable imagemap

Albuquerque's intention was to portray the moment when the princess, under the advice of José Bonifácio, prepares a letter to Dom Pedro, encouraging him to end Brasil's colonial status. It's in this famous letter that Maria Leopoldina writes: "The pome is ripe, harvest it now, or else it will rot". Dom Pedro received the letter on 7 September 1822, the date of the "Cry of Independence".

The painting has the following caption, in direct reference to Rocha Pombo's analysis of independence:

The State council was called for a meeting on September 1 (or 2), at 10 a.m.. All the ministers were already present on the Paço. José Bonifácio orally described the state of public affairs, and concluded saying it was not possible anymore to remain in that state of doubt and indecision, and that to save Brazil the separation from Portugal should be proclaimed immediately. He proposes then writing to D. Pedro without further delay that he put to an end, right there, in São Paulo, to that situation so painful to the Brazilians.

— Rocha Pombo,

== Context ==
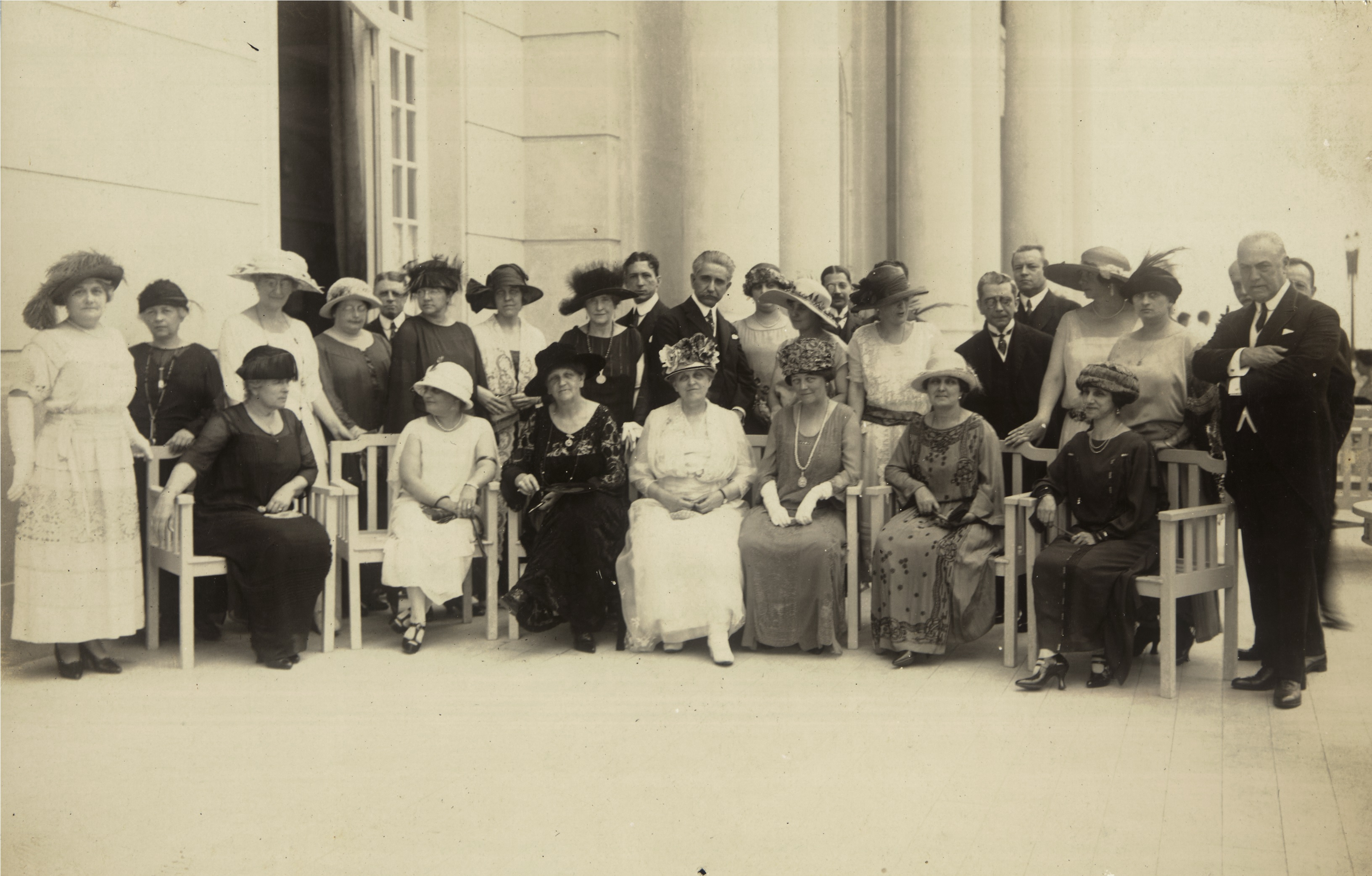
First Feminist Congress of Brazil, 1922.

Georgina de Albuquerque painted Sessão do Conselho de Estado during a time of social conflict over women's suffrage. In 1922, Bertha Lutz and other suffragists organised the First Feminist Congress of Brazil and founded the Brazilian Federation for Women's Progress. That context is consequenctial for the production and interpretation of the artwork, and also in the artist's career.

Albuquerque's painting, although perhaps it was not the artist's intention, supported "the feminist struggle for recognition of women's right to vote and full citizenship [in the beginning of the 20th century], in portraying Leopoldina in the middle of political action, deciding the fate of the country [a century before]" . On the other hand, academicist circles and the historical painting market were almost exclusive to male artists, and in those circumstances, Albuquerque's trajectory is marked by "perseverance" and a rupture with the prevailing belief that "submission and reservation" were the main characteristics of women. Because of that, it was considered a way to defy male predominance in the academicist genre.

The painting and it exhibition occurred when Albuquerque had already received recognition for her artistic career. Her artworks had stood out in art exhibits held in the previous years of 1907, 1912, 1914 and 1919. In 1920, she participated in an academical jury for an artistic competition, being the first woman to participate in a jury of this type in Brazil. Therefore, in 1921, when she began production of Sessão do Conselho de Estado, the painter already had a stable professional situation and had achieved commercial success.

Georgina de Albuquerque had already created, in the first fifteen years of the 20th century, paintings about women. However, the presence of men in Sessão do Conselho de Estado, stands out among the painter's other works. The portrayal of the scene from 1822 was developed based on research in the Escola Nacional de Belas Artes (National School of Fine Arts) and the Brazilian Historic and Geographic Institute.

While Albuquerque exhibited the painting for the first time in 1922, the Modern Art Week was also taking place. It is a period of change in the artistic canons, one which influenced the painter. Therefore, this transition is also present in the painting itself, insofar as it combines modernism, an artistic movement on the rise at the time, and academicism, which was already in decline. Among the modernist vanguards, the impressionist American painter Mary Cassatt was an influence on the painting.

== Style ==
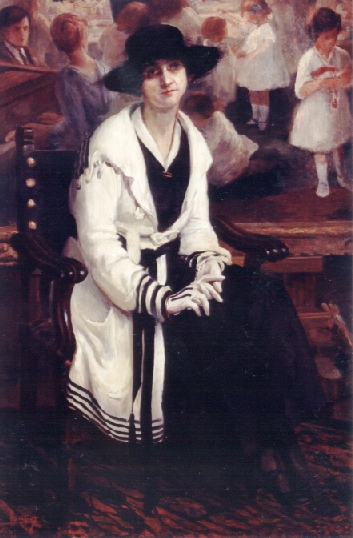
Georgina de Albuquerque portrayed in a painting by her husband Lucílio de Albuquerque.

From a stylistic point of view, the painting has been described as a "contained audacity" (Portuguese: "ousadia contida"). That because, in a way, it "clearly contradicts certain expectations that guide the common view on what a historical painting should be", like the triumphalism and male heroism; otherwise, it indicates an "academicisation of impressionism", as although the colours and the painting technique are not academicist, there are conventional historical painting elements in the work, specially the framing and the theme.

This oil painting one canvas congregates elements from two Brazilian artistic movements, modernism and academicism. Academicist characteristics of Sessão do Conselho de Estado are: historical theme, the type of classical framing of the characters in the scene, the size of the artwork, and a certain quest for faithfulness in the forms of the portrayed personalities. Also identified were impressionist influences, like the dilution of reality, in which, despite it being possible to recognise the figures, they aren't portrayed precisely.

The encounter of influences from distinct artistic movements within the work caused it to be defined as "a compromise solution between academicist theme and impressionist style, characterizing the 'discreet audacity' [...] of its author - conservative in her language, audacious in her social subversion and genre aesthetics.

Regarding Albuquerque's stylistic choice, the sociologist Ana Paula Cavalcanti Simioni wrote:

From a formal point of view, the least that can be said that Georgina was timid, as she searched for this compromise solution already repeatedly used by French artists she knew, as a student or as an spectator, from her formation period in France. Those formulas, still present in the 1980s in artists called juste milieu were absorbed by various other Brazilian artists such as Visconti, Calixto, Amoedo, Décio Villares, Manoel Lopes Rodrigues, Firmino Monteiro, among others, constituting a safe artistic work environment, with a relatively stable public, or in other words it demonstrated a desire for keeping up to date, a taste for the modern, but without great anxiety for rupture with the academic system.

—

== Public imagination on independence ==
Independence or Death Independência ou Morte, by Pedro Américo.

Sessão do Conselho de Estado is a counterpoint to the academicist artwork Independence or Death (Independência ou Morte), by Pedro Américo, the most well-known pictorial depiction of the end of Brazil's colonial status. In that painting, the proclamation of Independence is portrayed based on the heroization of Dom Pedro, with raised sword, in a triumphal scene. Albuquerque counters the depiction by Pedro Américo by: choosing a woman as central character, inverting the expected position between the characters, with the secondary characters above the protagonist, choosing an impressionist style, and working in the field of historical painting, normally exclusively male.

The sociologist Ana Paula Simioni analysed that:

Leopoldina is portrayed as the antipode of her husband: elegant, serene, com a noble tranquillity, her strength doesn't come from tangible physical characteristics, but from an intellectual supremacy, corroborated in the rigid posture of a statesman. It can be imagined that the artist wanted to introduce the idea that the princess didn't "give the Cry", but engendered it, leaving to her husband to take care of the simple execution of the action.

—

The depiction of Independence in Albuquerque's work doesn't take on a warlike character, "a decision provoked by the impetus of indignation", but as a "result of a serene planning, from a political negotiation done by diplomats whose strength came from a strategizing intellect, and not from warrior physical strength". That contributes to a historiographic current that doesn't presents the end of colonial status as a rupture, but as a gradual national process, during which the State Council guaranteed cohesion and stability.

== Outlook on Maria Leopoldina ==
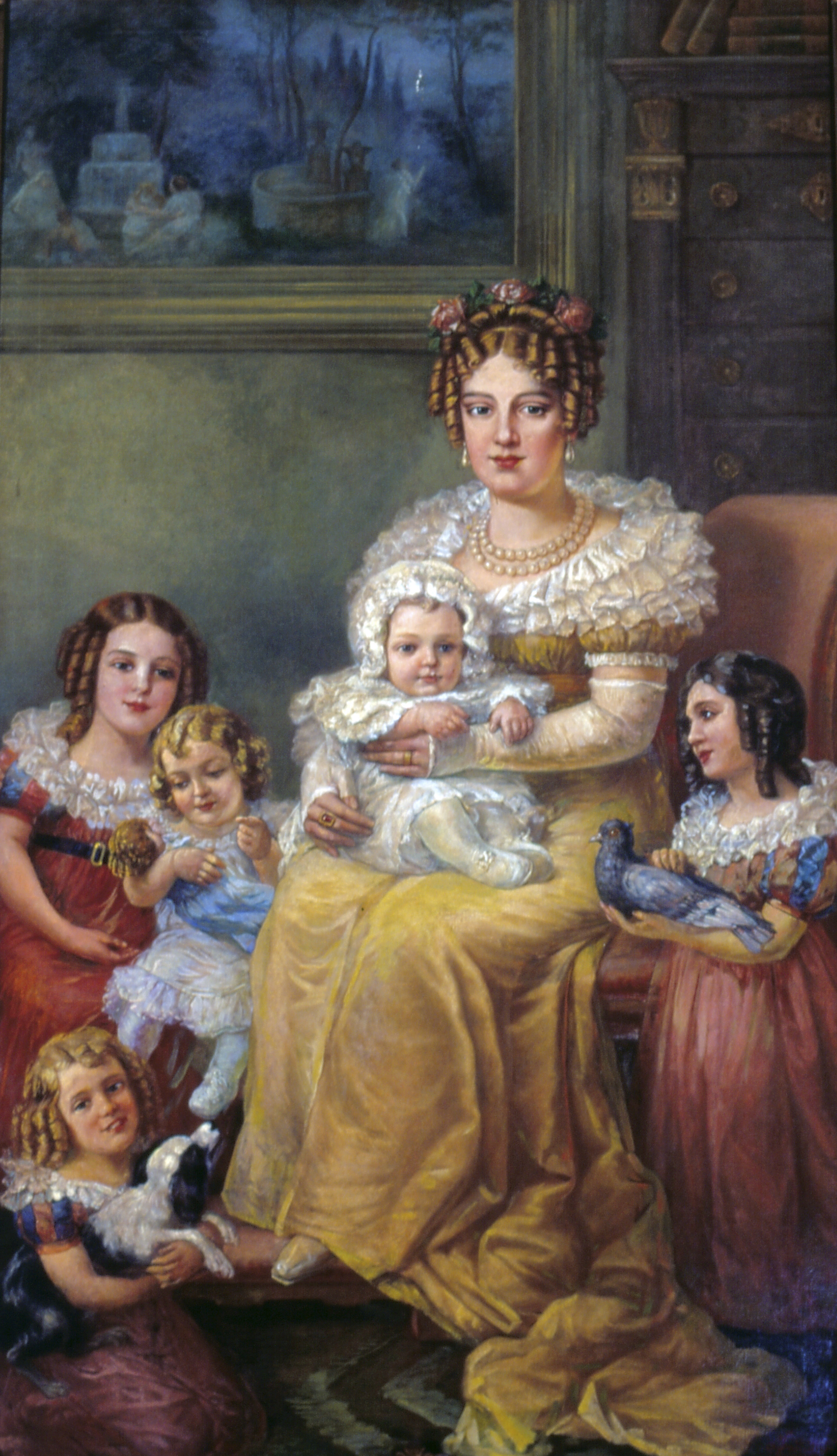
Retrato de Dona Leopoldina de Habsburgo e seus filhos (1921) (Portrait of Dona Leopoldina of Habsburg and her children), by Domenico Failutti.

Albuquerque's painting counters the artwork Retrato de Dona Leopoldina de Habsburgo e seus filhos (1921) (Portrait of Dona Leopoldina of Habsburg and her children), by Domenico Failutti, also made for the celebrations of the Brazilian Independence centenary. The artworks establish a "visual battle", in the way they differ in the depiction of the role of Maria Leopoldina.

On one hand, in her artwork, Albuquerque seemed to have echoed the feminist struggle by putting the princess in the role of historical subject, contradicting the dominant ideology that only domestic roles are fit for women. In a way, the painting "masculinises" the portrayed character. On another hand, Failutti depicted Maria Leopoldina as a stereotyped virtuous mother. That was actually a declared choice by the then director of the Museu Paulista (Paulista Museum) Afonso d'Escragnolle Taunay, when he commissioned the painting to Failutti. In this comparison, Sessão do Conselho de Estado defines a "new woman", contributing to modifying conventional views of genre relations.

The portrayal of the princess as protagonist of the Independence also contradicts the academicist convention of depicting women as allegories of the nation, violated by colonisation. An iconic example is the work of Victor Meirelles, who portrays Brazil as a dead nude indigenous woman in Moema. Maria Leopoldina, in Albuquerque's perspective, is not a victim or passive character, but an agent in the process of rupture with colonial status.

== Reception ==
Sessão do Conselho de Estado was exhibited publicly in the Exposition of Contemporary Art and Retrospective Art of the Independence Centenary, that began on 12 November 1922. The painting was selected in 1923, together with artworks by Augusto Bracet, Helios Seelinger and Pedro Paulo Bruno, to be bought by the public art collection, the main prize of this fine arts event with a goal of acquiring works that alluded to the national formation of Brazil. The selection was made by Flexa Ribeiro, Archimedes Memória and Rodolfo Chambelland, with their task being searching for new iconographic portrayals of historical interpretations of independence. Albuquerque's artwork was described afterwards as "the most important" of these new portrayals.

The artwork, particularly due to its size, lead Albuquerque to consolidate herself as an exponent in the academicist movement in Brazil, specially of the Escola Nacional de Belas Artes (National School of Fine Arts), of which she became director in 1952. Furthermore, she is considered exemplar for having consolidated herself as professional painter in a field that until then was fundamentally dominated by men.

=== Critical reception ===
In the magazine Ilustração Brasileira (Brazilian Illustration), the art critic Ercole Cremona celebrated Albuquerque's painting as a "beautiful artwork inspired by the concepts of Rocha Pombo", in which the painter "lent all of her great soul, all of her feeling and her marvellous technique to the painting, where there's moved and well drawn figures, resolved attitudes and palette resolved with great wisdom". In the Revista da Semana (Week Magazine), it was said that the artwork was done in a "canvas of large size, inclined to modern tastes, joyful to the eyes due to the polychromy, pleasing to the spirit due to the subject".

In a note in O Jornal (The Newspaper), it was recorded that "the princess' figure is shown magnificently, in the purity of her lines and in the nobility of her attitude". In contrast, José Bonifácio, standing up, apparently exposing the crisis between the Portuguese Crown and the colony to Maria Leopoldina, lacks prominence. It has been noted that in the painting, there's an historiographic error, considered "grave" : the uniform should have been blue, in the colour of this type of clothing during the first reign, and in the painting it's green, the Empire's colour.
