= João Manuel Bernardo =

Angolan diplomat

Ambassador of Angola to Vietnam
- Incumbent
- Assumed office 2011
- Preceded by: Position established

Governor of Malanje
- In office 1992–1992
- Preceded by: João Filipe Martins
- Succeeded by: Flávio João Fernandes

Minister of Education of Angola
- In office 1992–1996
- Preceded by: António Burity da Silva
- Succeeded by: António Burity da Silva

Ambassador of Angola to Cuba
- In office 1996–2002
- Preceded by: António Burity da Silva
- Succeeded by: Condesse de Carvalho Toka

Ambassador of Angola to China
- In office 2002–2011
- Preceded by: Manuel Bernardo de Sousa
- Succeeded by: João Garcia Bires

Personal details
- Party: MPLA

João Manuel Bernardo is the ambassador of Angola to the Socialist Republic of Vietnam. He visited the PRC in November 2007.

== See also ==
- Angola-China relations
