= Joaquim Gonçalves Ledo =

Brazilian journalist and politician (1781–1847)

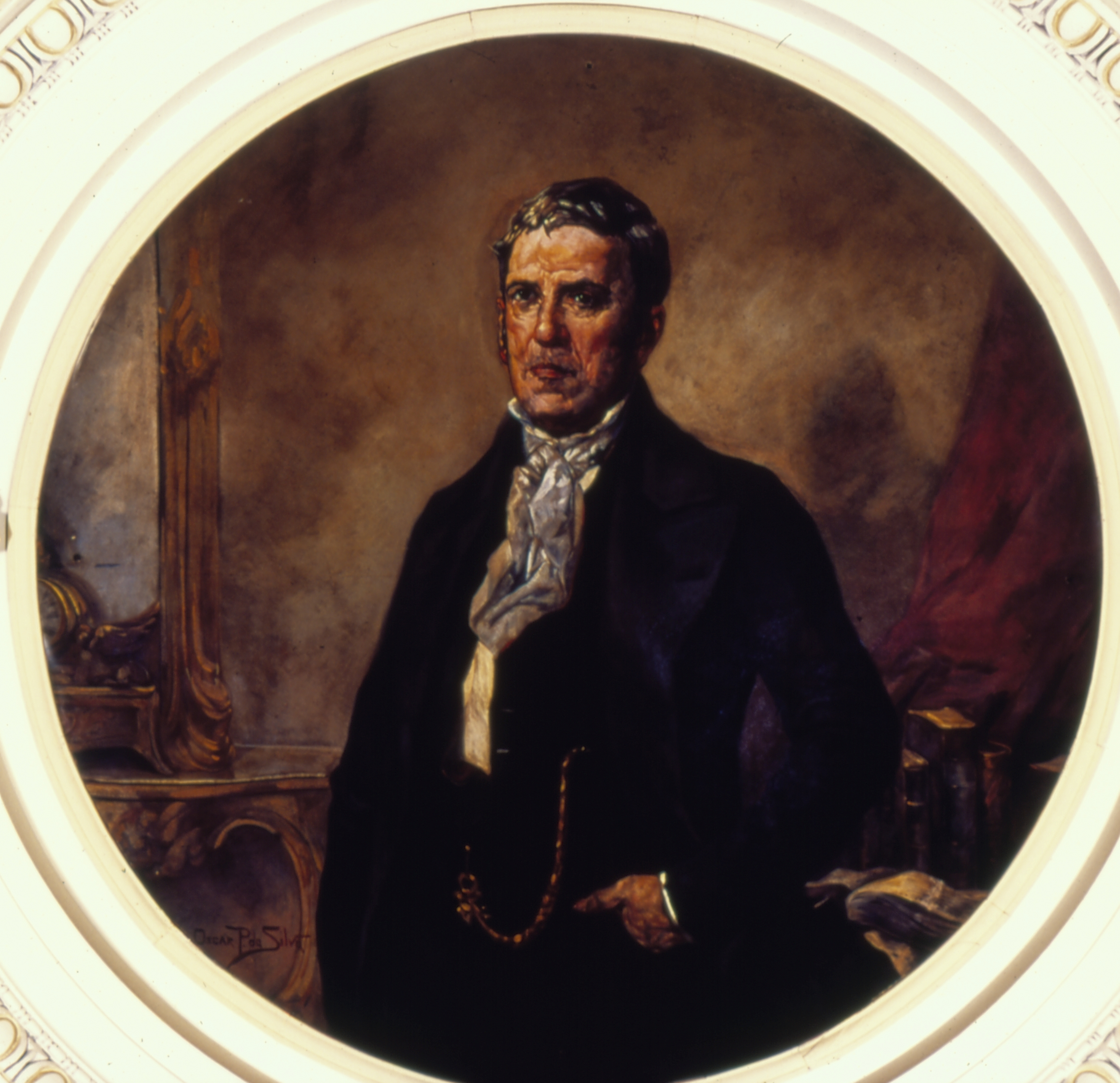
- Painting by Oscar Pereira da Silva
- Born: 11 December 1781; Cachoeiras de Macacu, Rio de Janeiro, State of Brazil, Portuguese America
- Died: 9 May 1847 (aged 65); Sumidouro, Rio de Janeiro, Empire of Brazil
- Occupations: Journalist and politician
- Known for: Revérbero Constitucional Fluminense

Joaquim Gonçalves Ledo (11 December 1781 – 9 May 1847) was a Brazilian journalist and politician. He was active in the freemasonry movement in Brazil. He was one of the leaders of the more liberal and democrat faction during the confused period around the time of the declaration of independence of Brazil in 1822.

== Early years ==
Joaquim Gonçalves Ledo was born in Cachoeiras de Macacu, Rio de Janeiro, Brazil on 11 December 1781. His parents were Antonio Gonçalves Ledo and Maria dos Reis. At the age of fourteen he went to Portugal to complete his secondary education, and then enrolled at the University of Coimbra to study medicine. When his father died in 1808 Ledo cut short his education and returned to Brazil. He found a job as a clerk in the army arsenal.

The freemasonry movement in Brazil was similar to that of France, tending to support a republican form of government. The Pernambucan Revolt, in which a Brazilian republic was declared on 6 March 1817, had many freemasons among its leaders. The revolt was suppressed by the army. On 30 March 1818 King John VI of Portugal, who had taken refuge in Brazil from the Napoleonic Wars in 1808, signed a decree prohibited all secret societies. A liberal revolution in 1820 forced the king to return to Portugal on April the following year, leaving his son Prince Pedro as regent. Ledo was a freemason, and helped reinstate the Comércio e Artes lodge in 1821.

== Transition to independence ==
Ledo was Liberal and deeply patriotic. He had absorbed the democratic ideals of the encyclopédistes, but accepted that Brazilian independence could only be achieved under a constitutional monarchy. Unlike the wealthy landowners of the southeast he wanted a more democratic government in Brazil. He and Januário da Cunha Barbosa founded the influential newspaper Revérbero Constitucional Fluminense (The Echo). Its first issue appeared in Rio de Janeiro on 15 September 1821, promoting independence.

On 9 December 1821 the Cortes of Lisbon ordered Prince Pedro to return to Portugal. He refused. Dom Pedro named José Bonifácio de Andrada Minister of State and Foreign Affairs – in effect Premier. In response to threats of a return to the status of a colony subordinate to Portugal, a decree of 16 February 1822 created a Board of Attorneys General of the Provinces of Brazil. José Gonçalves Ledo proposed to this board that an elected Constituent Assembly should be convened. Pedro accepted the proposal and ordered the convocation of the assembly in June 1822. José Bonifácio accepted the decision but proposed indirect elections, which was eventually agreed upon. Ledo was elected a deputy.

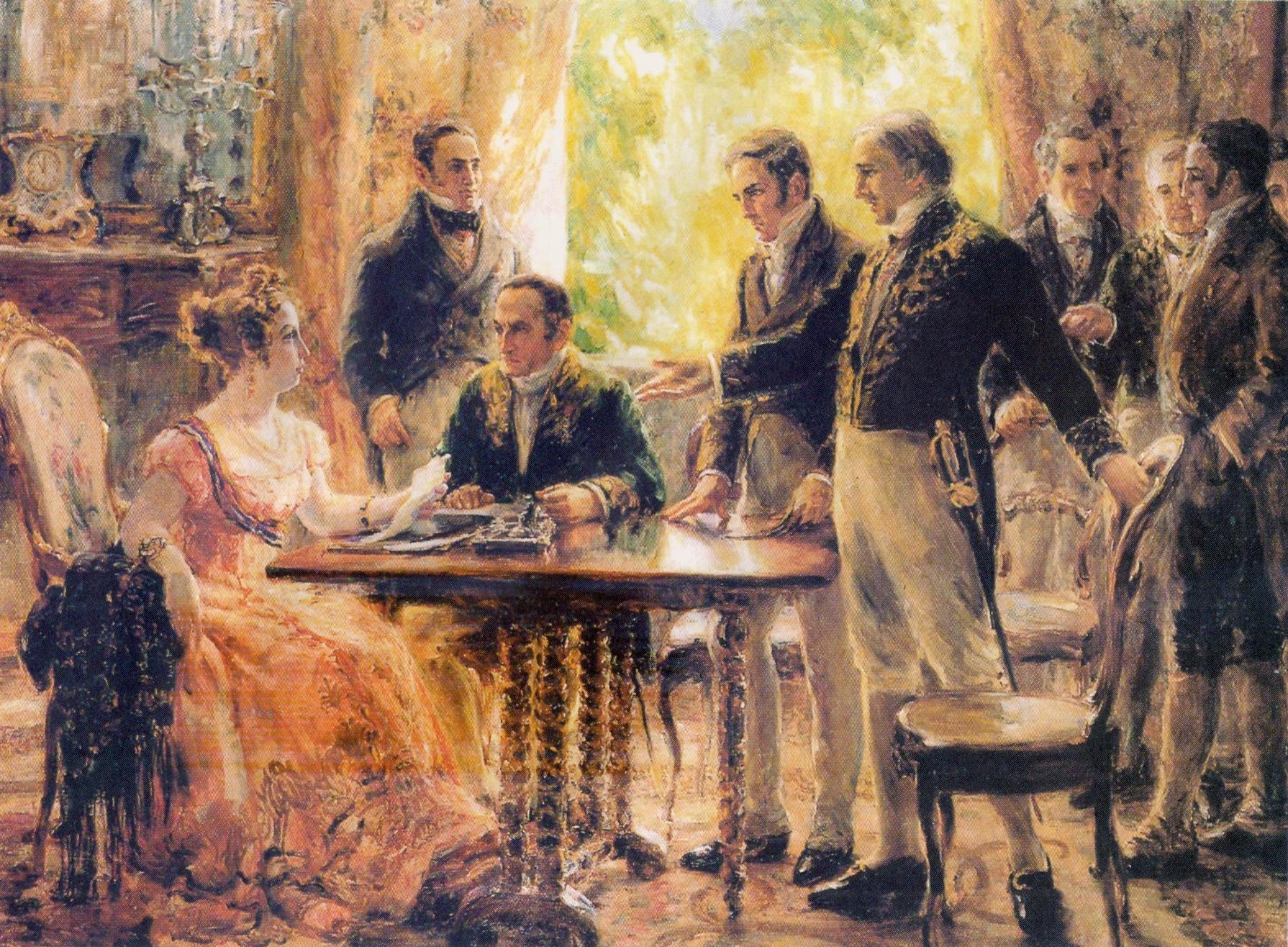
Sessão do Conselho de Estado, depicting Archduchess Maria Leopoldina of Austria during a meeting on 2 September 1822 while Dom Pedro was in São Paulo province. Martim Francisco Ribeiro de Andrada is seated beside her. José Bonifácio is standing and gesturing towards her. Ledo is standing between the Andradas.

On 13 May 1822, due to the work of Ledo's group and following a proposal by Domingos Alves Branco Muniz Barretto, Prince Pedro assumed the title of "Perpetual Defender of Brazil". On 17 July 1822 Ledo organized the masonic lodges into the "Grand Orient of Brazil". He offered the position of grand master to José Bonifácio, taking the immediately subordinate position of first vigilante. Prince Pedro definitely broke with Portugal on 7 September 1822 and became the first emperor of Brazil on 1 December 1822.

In late September 1822 the title of Grand Master of the Grand Orient was awarded to Dom Pedro. José Bonifácio de Andrada responded by prosecuting Ledo, accusing him of being a republican and secretly conspiring to overthrow the monarchy. On 30 October 1822 the Grand Orient was closed and Ledo and others in the group had to flee in order to avoid being arrested and deported. On 4 November 1822 Ledo's property was confiscated. Ledo took refuge in Argentina, where the local freemasons gave him a warm reception.

== Later career ==
José Bonifácio and his brother Martim Francisco Ribeiro de Andrada fell from power in July 1823. Lêdo returned to Brazil and took his seat as a deputy. Pedro I abdicated on 7 April 1831. For a brief time José Bonifácio and José Gonçalves Ledo worked together. Lêdo participated in reestablishing the Grand Orient in 1831-32. He remained a deputy until 1834. Until 1835 Ledo was a member of the Provincial Assembly of Rio de Janeiro. That year he retired from politics and Freemasonry. He died of a heart attack on his farm at Sumidouro, Rio de Janeiro, on 19 May 1847, aged 66.

Ledo played a central role in the transition of Brazil to independence. According to the Baron of Rio Branco, "It was Ledo who inspired all the great events of those two years in our capital, who urged the government to convene a constituent assembly and who wrote some of the key policy documents such as the manifesto of 1 August 1822 addressed by Dom Pedro to the Brazilians."
