= Faustina Fernandes Inglês de Almeida Alves =

Angolan politician

- Born: Angola
- Occupation: Politician

Faustina Fernandes Inglês de Almeida Alves is an Angolan politician. She is the current Minister of Social Action, Family and Gender Promotion of Angola, as well as a member of parliament. She is a member of MPLA.
