= Carlos António Fernandes =

Angolan politician

Carlos António Fernandes was the Angolan minister for transport from 1987 to 1990.
