= Carlos Antônio (footballer, born 1990) =

Brazilian footballer

Personal information
- Full name: Carlos Antônio Ribeiro de Oliveira
- Date of birth: April 3, 1990 (age 36)
- Place of birth: Apiacá, Brazil
- Height: 1.76 m (5 ft 9 in)
- Position: Striker

Team information
- Current team: Olaria
- Number: 18

Youth career
- 2003–2010: Vasco da Gama

Senior career*
Years	Team	Apps	(Gls)
2009	Vasco da Gama	2	(0)
2011–	Olaria	0	(0)
- * Club domestic league appearances and goals as of February 2, 2009

Carlos Antônio Ribeiro de Oliveira or simply Carlos Antônio (born April 3, 1990 in Apiacá), is a Brazilian striker. He currently plays for Olaria.

On January 24, 2009, Carlos Antônio played his first match for Vasco, when his club beat Americano 0-2 for the Campeonato Carioca.
