= Manuel Homem =

Angolan politician

Manuel Gomes da Conceição Homem

Minister of the Interior of Angola
- Incumbent
- Assumed office 31 October 2024
- Preceded by: Eugénio César Laborinho

Governor of Luanda Province
- In office September 2022 – 2024

Personal details
- Born: 24 November 1979 (age 46) Cabinda, Angola
- Party: MPLA
- Occupation: Engineer, professor, author and politician

Manuel Gomes da Conceição Homem (born 24 November 1979), commonly known as Manuel Homem, is an Angolan computer engineer and politician. He has served as Minister of the Interior of the Republic of Angola since 31 October 2024.

Throughout his career, he has held several positions in the Angolan public administration, particularly in the fields of information technology, electronic governance, telecommunications, social communication and territorial administration. His previous positions include Secretary of State for Information Technology, Minister of Telecommunications, Information Technology and Social Communication, and Governor of Luanda Province.

== Biography ==
=== Education and professional training ===
Manuel Gomes da Conceição Homem was born on 24 November 1979 in the province of Cabinda, Angola.

He holds a bachelor's degree in Computer Systems Engineering and a master's degree in Computer Networks and Systems. He also holds a Master of Business Administration (MBA) in Project Management.

His additional professional training includes advanced studies in Senior Leadership, with a focus on Institutional Integrity, Corporate Governance and Compliance, training in Teaching Methodology, and a secondary-level education qualification specialising in Biology and Chemistry.

=== Teaching career ===
He began his professional career in education, working as a teacher and instructor in Information Technology and Biochemistry between 1997 and 2008.

Between 2010 and 2016, he worked as a university lecturer at the Private University of Angola (UPRA) and the Lusíada University of Angola (ULA).

== Professional career in public administration ==
=== State Intelligence and Security Service ===
Served as a member of the State Intelligence and Security Service and also held a position on secondment at the Ministry of Territorial Administration.

=== National Centre for Information Technologies ===
Between 2013 and 2016, he served as Director-General of the National Centre for Information Technologies (CNTI), where he performed institutional management and leadership responsibilities in the field of information technology.

=== National Institute for the Promotion of the Information Society ===
Between 2016 and 2017, he served as Director-General of the National Institute for the Promotion of the Information Society (INFOSI), an institution dedicated to the development of the information society and the promotion of digital technologies.

== Government career ==
=== Secretary of State for Information Technology ===
Between 2017 and 2020, he served as Secretary of State for Information Technology at the Ministry of Telecommunications and Information Technology.

In this position, he was involved in the formulation, monitoring and implementation of public policies related to information technology, electronic governance and the technological modernisation of public administration.

=== Minister of Telecommunications, Information Technology and Social Communication ===
Between 2020 and 2022, he served as Minister of Telecommunications, Information Technology and Social Communication, with responsibility for public policies concerning telecommunications, information technology and social communication.

=== Governor of Luanda Province ===
Between 2022 and 2024, he served as Governor of Luanda Province, with responsibilities for coordinating local state administration and overseeing public policies related to territorial development.

=== Minister of the Interior ===
Since 31 October 2024, he has served as Minister of the Interior of the Republic of Angola, assuming political and strategic leadership responsibilities within the ministry.

== Political and party activities ==
Manuel Gomes da Conceição Homem joined the People's Movement for the Liberation of Angola (MPLA) in 1999.

Between 2009 and 2014, he was a member of the National Committee of the MPLA Youth Wing (JMPLA).

Since 2019, he has been a member of the MPLA Central Committee and Political Bureau.

Between 2022 and 2024, he served as the MPLA's First Provincial Secretary in Luanda.

== Career timeline ==
Period	Position
1997–2008	Teacher and instructor in Information Technology and Biochemistry
1999	Joined the MPLA
2009–2014	Member of the JMPLA National Committee
2010–2016	University lecturer
	State Intelligence and Security Service
2013–2016	Director-General of the National Centre for Information Technologies (CNTI)
2016–2017	Director-General of the National Institute for the Promotion of the Information Society (INFOSI)
2017–2020	Secretary of State for Information Technology
Since 2019	Member of the MPLA Central Committee and Political Bureau
2020–2022	Minister of Telecommunications, Information Technology and Social Communication
2022–2024	Governor of Luanda Province
2022–2024	MPLA First Provincial Secretary in Luanda
Since 31 October 2024	Minister of the Interior of the Republic of Angola

== Academic qualifications ==
- Master's degree in Computer Networks and Systems;
- Bachelor's degree in Computer Systems Engineering;
- Master of Business Administration (MBA) in Project Management;
- Advanced training in Senior Leadership, Institutional Integrity, Corporate Governance and Compliance;
- Training in Teaching Methodology;
- Secondary-level education qualification specialising in Biology and Chemistry.

== See also ==
- Politics of Angola
- People's Movement for the Liberation of Angola
- Ministry of the Interior (Angola)
