= Rosa Luís de Sousa Micolo =

Angolan politician

Rosa Luís de Sousa Micolo is an Angolan politician. She is the current Minister of Parliamentary Affairs of Angola, as well as a member of National Assembly. She is the member of MPLA.
