= José Luis de Matos =

Angolan politician

- Born: Angola
- Occupation: Politician

José Luis de Matos is an Angolan politician. He is the current Minister of Social Communication of Angola, as well as a member of parliament. He is a member of MPLA.
