= Ana Paula Chantre Luna de Carvalho =

Angolan politician

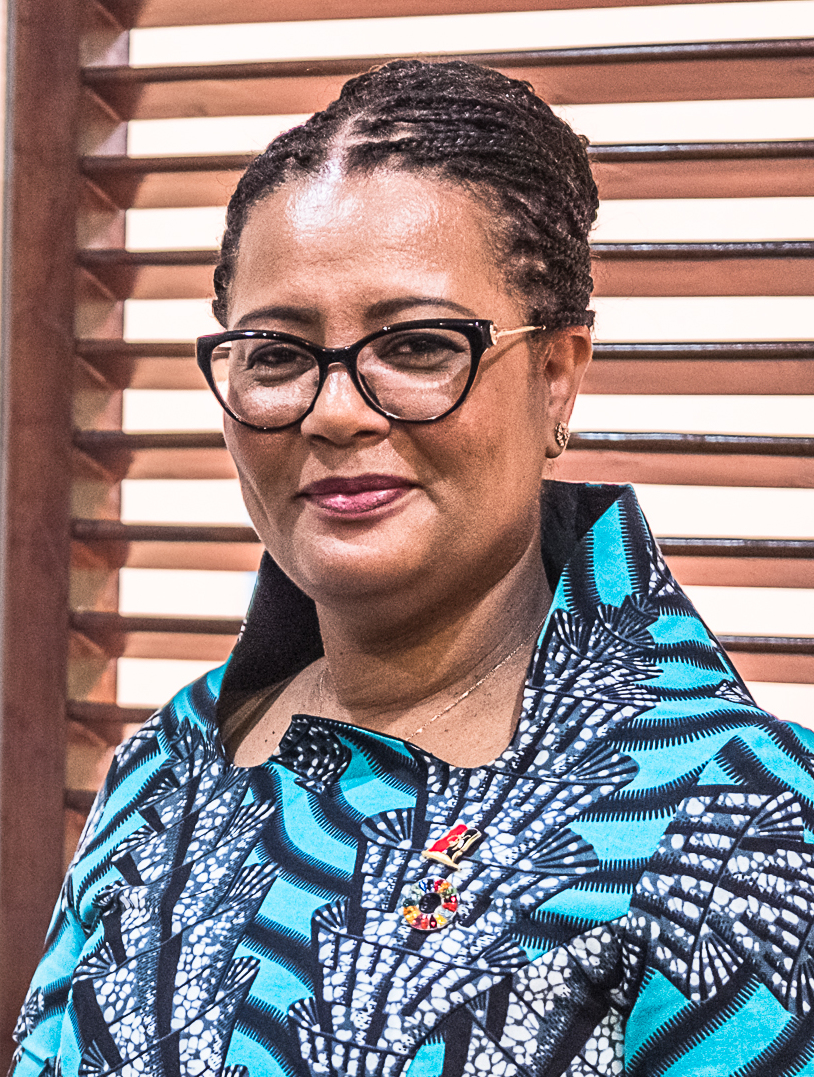
- Ana Paula Chantre Luna de Carvalho in 2025
- Born: Angola
- Occupation: Politician

Ana Paula Chantre Luna de Carvalho is an Angolan politician. She is the current Minister of Spatial Planning and Housing of Angola, as well as a member of parliament. She is the member of MPLA.
