= Gilberto Buta Lutucuta =

Angolan politician and diplomat

Ambassador of Angola to Côte d'Ivoire
- In office 12 December 2007 – 2019

Minister of Agriculture and Rural Development
- In office 1999–2007

Personal details
- Born: c. 1942 Bailundo, Huambo, Angola
- Died: 18 February 2022 (aged 79–80) Luanda, Angola
- Children: Silvia Lutacuta

Gilberto Buta Lutucuta (c. 1942 in Bailundo – 18 February 2022 in Luanda) was Angola's Minister of Agriculture and Rural Development from 1999 to 2007 and the ambassador of Angola to Côte d'Ivoire from 2007 to 2019.

== Death ==
Gilberto died in February 2022 after a brief illness
