= Diamantino Pedro Azevedo =

Angolan politician

- Born: Angola
- Occupation: Politician

Diamantino Pedro Azevedo is an Angolan politician. He is the current Minister of Mineral Resources and Petroleum of Angola, as well as a member of parliament. He is a member of MPLA.
