= Carlos Antônio Napion =

Italian and Brazilian general (1757–1814)

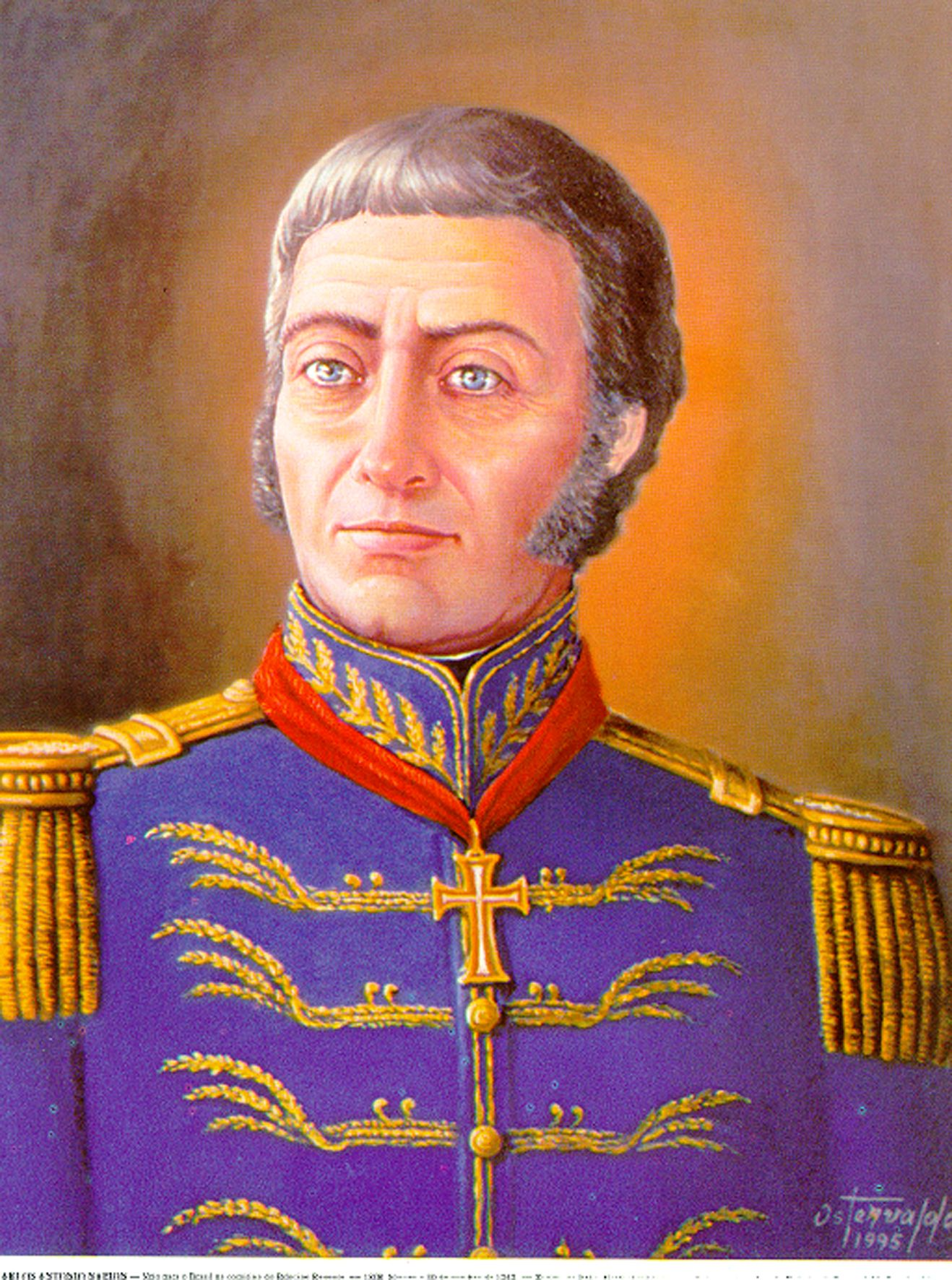
- Born: Carlo Antonio Maria di Galleani Napione Coconato; 30 October 1757; Turin, Piedmont, Kingdom of Sardinia
- Died: 22 June 1814 (aged 56); Rio de Janeiro, Brazil
- Occupation: Soldier

Carlos Antônio Napion (30 October 1757 – 22 June 1814), originally from Piedmont, was an engineer who became a general in the Portuguese army in Brazil. He set in motion the industry needed to create war materials in Brazil.

== Early years ==
Carlo Antonio Maria di Galleani Napione Coconato, better known by the Portuguese form Carlos Antônio Napion, was born in Turin, Piedmont, on 30 October 1757. He joined the army of Piedmont at the age of 14. Through most of his career he studied chemistry and metallurgy and their military applications. He specialized in ordnance, and rose to the rank of major.

In 1800 the French army occupied Piedmont after the Battle of Marengo, and Napion moved to Portugal. Based on his proven expertise, on 26 August 1800 Rodrigo de Sousa Coutinho invited him to join the army of Portugal to reorganize the army's artillery. He shared an interest in science with José Bonifácio de Andrada, and accompanied Andrada that year on a mineralogical exploration of Estremadura and Beira. In 1807 he was promoted to Brigadier, and became Royal Inspector of the Army and of the military workshops and laboratories.

== Brazil ==
Napion accompanied the court of John VI of Portugal when it moved to Brazil in 1807–08. He was charged with establishing the industry required for national defense. This included production and storage of equipment. Napion created the Unit of Battle Equipment organization of the Brazilian Army. In 1808 he established the first gunpowder factory in Brazil on the shore of the Lagoa Rodrigo de Freitas, and became director of the factory. He accompanied José Bonifácio and his brother Martim Francisco Ribeiro de Andrada in their mineralogical explorations of the province of São Paulo. Napion reached the rank of Lieutenant General, the highest rank in Brazil at the time.

Napion became the main authority on military technology of the time, fully supported by the Prince Regent John. He was the author of several technical books. Napion became the President of the board that directed the Royal Military Academy in 1810. It was said of Napion in this position that he had great knowledge and undoubted probity, but completely ignored the principles of military academies. Carlos Antônio Napion died on 22 June 1814 while holding the position of President of the board of the Brazilian Royal Military Academy, member of the Supreme Military Council, inspector of the Royal Iron Factory of Lagoa Rodrigo de Freitas and Inspector General of the Royal Council of the Arsenal, factories and foundries.
