= Márcio Daniel =

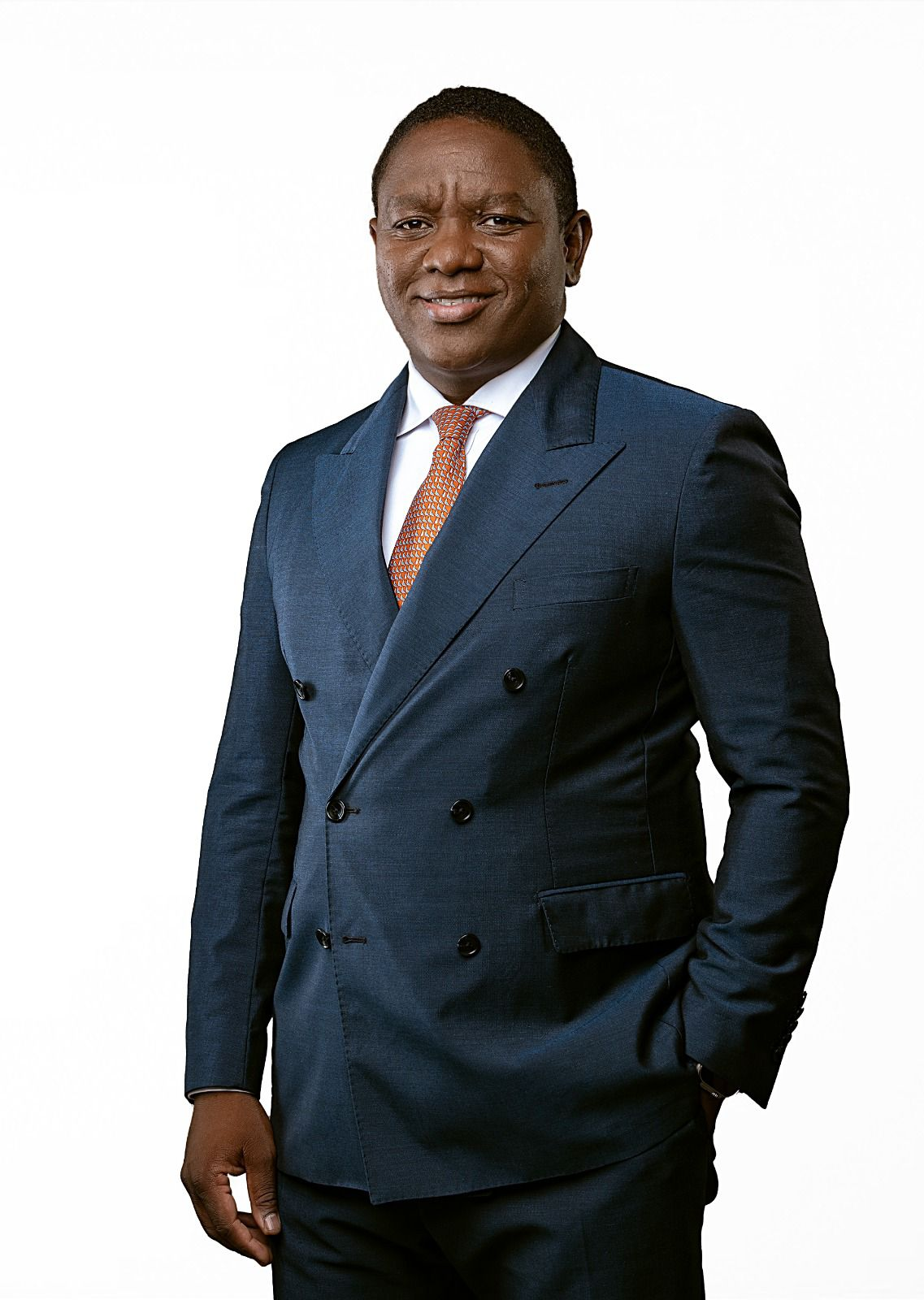

Minister of Tourism
- Incumbent
- Assumed office 28 March 2024
- President: João Lourenço
- Preceded by: Filipe Zau (as Minister of Culture and Tourism)

Secretary of State for Local Authorities
- In office 2020–2024

Secretary of State for State Reform
- In office September 2017 – 2020

Personal details
- Born: Márcio de Jesus Lopes Daniel; 8 October 1985 Luanda, Angola
- Education: Catholic University of Angola; Catholic University of Portugal; University of Lisbon; Harvard Law School
- Occupation: Jurist, university lecturer and politician

Márcio de Jesus Lopes Daniel (born 8 October 1985 in Luanda) is an Angolan jurist and politician. He has served as Minister of Tourism of the Republic of Angola since 28 March 2024, following the separation of the former Ministry of Culture, Tourism and Environment into distinct ministerial departments.

== Early life and education ==
Born in the province of Luanda, Márcio Daniel is the son of Sebastião Daniel Neto and Maria da Conceição Luís Matias Lopes Neto. He began his higher education with a preparatory course in Philosophy at the Espírito Santo Minor Seminary in Sumbe, Cuanza Sul Province, a Catholic institution. He subsequently completed a Law degree at the Catholic University of Angola, in both the legal-economic and legal-forensic tracks, and was named the Faculty of Law's "best student" in two consecutive years, 2007 and 2008.

He obtained a Master's degree in Administrative Law, with a specialisation in Public Procurement, from the Lisbon School of the Faculty of Law of the Catholic University of Portugal, in a research-oriented programme. He completed postgraduate studies in Tax Law at the Faculty of Law of the University of Lisbon and was a visiting researcher at Harvard Law School in Boston, in the field of constitutional and comparative law. He is married and his working languages are Portuguese, English and Spanish.

== Academic and associative activity ==
Prior to entering government, Márcio Daniel pursued an academic career of more than a decade at the Catholic University of Angola, where he lectured on Constitutional Law, Public Finance, Financial Law and Economic Law, and served as Deputy Director of the Centre for Legal Research of the Faculty of Law.

In parallel with his academic trajectory, he held positions of student representation and pastoral coordination. He served as Secretary-General of the Students' Association of the Catholic University of Angola, as a member of the same university's University Pastoral Commission, and as Coordinator of the Youth Pastoral Commission of the Our Lady of Nazaré Parish.

== Professional career ==
After completing his studies, Márcio Daniel began his legal career as a trainee lawyer at Sérvulo & Associados in Lisbon. On returning to Angola, he joined the Carlos Freitas & Associados law firm and subsequently served as legal counsel at the Ministry of Commerce, working with the minister in office at the time.

Within the Angolan financial and regulatory sector, he served as Legal Adviser to the Chairman of the Board of the Capital Market Commission and held positions at the Banco de Poupança e Crédito, first as Head of the Studies and Regulatory Production Department of the Legal Office and later as a member of the Audit Board. At the Ministry of Finance, he served as Head of the Studies and Regulatory Production Department of the Legal Office and, subsequently, as Director of the Legal Office.

== Government positions ==
=== Secretary of State (2017–2024) ===
In September 2017, Márcio Daniel was appointed Secretary of State for State Reform at the Ministry of Territory Administration and State Reform. He was associated with the Simplifica 1.0 programme, launched in June 2021, which aimed to streamline thirty-two administrative acts and procedures with significant impact on citizens' lives, including the issuance of identity cards, driving licences, passports and other administrative permits. In 2020 he was appointed Secretary of State for Local Authorities, a position he held until joining the Cabinet.

=== Minister of Tourism (2024–present) ===
On 28 March 2024, President João Lourenço appointed Márcio Daniel Minister of Tourism by presidential decree signed on the same day. The appointment followed the Council of Ministers decision, taken the previous day, to split the areas under the former Ministry of Culture, Tourism and Environment into distinct departments. He was sworn in on 1 April 2024 in a ceremony presided over by João Lourenço, during which the Head of State requested an assessment of the reasons why Angola, despite a visa-exemption regime covering more than 90 countries and improvements to the business environment, had not yet succeeded in attracting tourism in significant numbers. The portfolio was assumed in the context of the recent approval, on 14 March 2024, of the National Tourism Development Plan (PLANATUR), which foresees state investment of approximately 2.5 trillion kwanzas over the 2024–2027 period, focused on eight provinces identified as having the greatest tourism potential: Benguela, Luanda, Cuando Cubango, Cuanza Norte, Malanje, Namibe, Huíla and Zaire.

At the start of his tenure, the tourism sector's contribution to Angola's GDP had declined from 1.3% in 2016 to 0.01% in 2022, while tourism revenues had fallen from US$628 million to US$24 million over the same period. The country's Long-Term Strategy (ELP) sets out goals of raising tourism's contribution to 1.9% of GDP by 2050 and increasing international arrivals to two million per year, up from 129,000 in 2022.

In his first month in office, he undertook a six-day working visit to Namibe Province, during which he toured archaeological sites and tourist attractions in the communes of Lola, Camucuio and Bibala, including the rock engravings at Tchipopilo, the Caraculo archaeological site, Fort Ombaka, the Oceanus tourist complex, the Fort of São Fernando, the Cine Estúdio, and the Tômbwa Peninsula, concluding with a meeting with sector operators.

In March 2025, the Ministry of Tourism initiated, under his leadership, a process to classify the Luanda Island — a coastal sandbar approximately seven kilometres long widely regarded as an urban landmark of the capital — as an Area of Tourist Interest and Potential. The process began with the establishment of a commission chaired by the Minister himself, comprising representatives of the Provincial Government of Luanda, the Municipal Administration of Ingombota, the Luanda Island Residents' Commission and tourism-sector associations, tasked with inventorying and registering the natural, cultural, gastronomic and tourism resources of the area.

In August 2025, the Ministry of Tourism launched four strategic and structural projects aimed at restructuring the sector and positioning it as a pillar of economic diversification: Capacita Turismo (Tourism Training), to train and qualify personnel in the country's 21 provinces; Comunica Turismo (Tourism Communication), an integrated communication strategy to support the international promotion of the Visit Angola brand; Planifica Turismo (Tourism Planning), based on the sustainable planning of 29 areas of tourist interest while respecting local environments and communities; and Reclassifica Turismo (Tourism Reclassification), intended to harmonise hotel classification with international standards.

During his tenure, the Angola Convention Bureau (ACB) was launched, dedicated to the events tourism segment, and in December 2025 a MICE Tourism Development Strategy was adopted. In 2025 the country brand Visit Angola – The Rhythm of Life was launched and, on 15 October of the same year, Angola was announced in Berlin as the Official Partner Country of ITB Berlin 2026, held from 3 to 5 March 2026.

In November 2025, Luanda hosted the 7th African Union–European Union Summit. Márcio Daniel participated in the welcoming of heads of state and government at Quatro de Fevereiro Airport, including Ismail Omar Guelleh (Djibouti), Emmanuel Macron (France) and Pedro Sánchez (Spain).

In December 2025, the Council of Ministers approved legislative measures in the sector under his responsibility, notably the introduction of a tourist tax applicable to foreign visitors and a draft presidential decree on the development of maritime tourism — particularly the cruise segment — aimed at making use of the ports of Luanda, Namibe and Lobito.

His international promotion activity included participation, in April 2025, in the Angola–South Africa Bilateral Tourism Forum, held in Cape Town, where he invited South African and other foreign investors to allocate capital to Angola's tourism sector and emphasised the use of South African experience to strengthen the Angolan market. In June 2025, he attended the Doing Business Angola conference in Lisbon, held as part of the celebrations marking the fiftieth anniversary of Angolan independence, where he called for foreign investment in the hotel, eco-resort and theme park sectors. In February 2026, he sat on a panel at the World Government Summit in Dubai, titled "Tourism as a Driver of Local Economic Growth", where he referred to a presidential authorisation in excess of 400 million euros for the construction of integrated infrastructure in the country's bays. The international Visit Angola promotional campaign was also extended during his tenure, from Germany, Austria and Switzerland to Spain, Poland and the United Kingdom.

In March 2026, Márcio Daniel announced that the number of tourists visiting Angola for leisure had grown by approximately 20% in 2025, rising from 44,000 entries in 2024 to 52,072 in 2025, reversing the previous predominance of business tourism. The capture strategy outlined by the Minister includes press trips and familiarisation trips for foreign journalists and operators, investment in regional infrastructure — notably the electrification of Mussulo Island — and Angola's role in the Kavango–Zambezi Transfrontier Conservation Area (KAZA) transboundary environmental conservation project, which also involves Namibia, Zambia, Botswana and Zimbabwe.

In May 2026, Márcio Daniel represented Angola at the 7th Ministerial Conference of the Benguela Current Convention (BCC) — an intergovernmental framework signed in 2013 by Angola, Namibia and South Africa to jointly manage the Benguela Current Large Marine Ecosystem — where he addressed the implementation of Angola's National Sea Strategy (ENMA) and called on the two partner countries to coordinate a common agenda for sustainable development in transboundary marine areas.

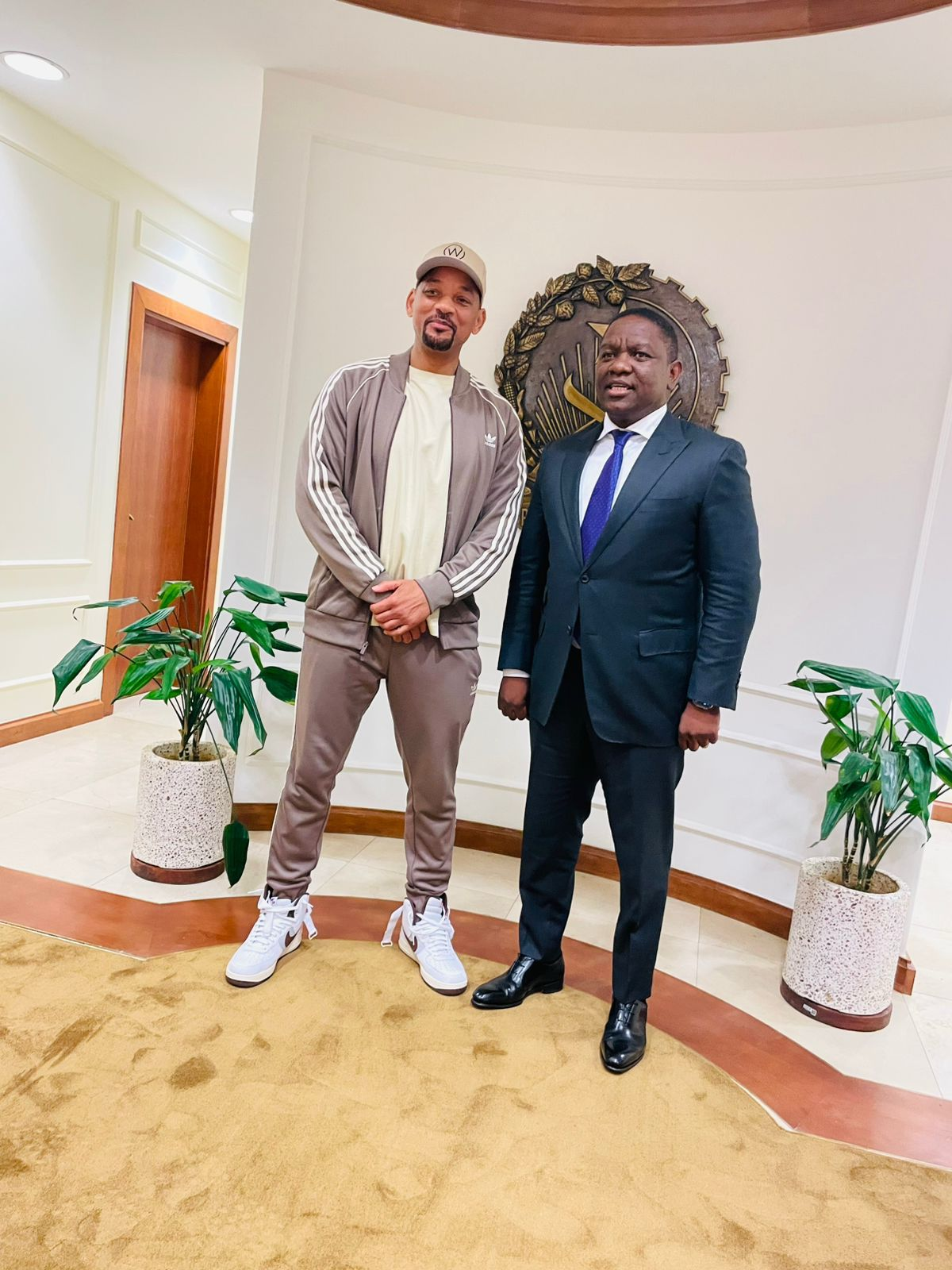
Márcio Daniel with Will Smith at the Ministry of Tourism in Luanda, during the official visit relating to the announcement of the E1 Luanda GP 2026 (March 2026).

On 26 March 2026, in Luanda, the E1 Luanda GP 2026 was announced — a round of the UIM E1 World Championship, the international electric hydrofoil powerboat racing series — scheduled for 12 and 13 September 2026. The announcement was made by Márcio Daniel at a joint press conference with Alejandro Agag, the championship's chairman, and American actor and producer Will Smith, owner of the Westbrook Racing team. On the same occasion, a title partnership between Westbrook Racing and the Visit Angola brand was made public, with the team competing under the new designation Visit Angola Westbrook Racing. Angola thereby became the second African location on the championship calendar and the first in Southern Africa, joining a season that includes Monaco, Miami and Lake Como. During his stay in Luanda, Will Smith was received by President João Lourenço, and the agenda also included discussions on cooperation in the audiovisual sector.
