= Antônio Carlos (footballer, born 1994) =

Brazilian footballer

Personal information
- Full name: Antônio Carlos Souza da Silva Júnior
- Date of birth: 17 September 1994 (age 32)
- Place of birth: Belo Horizonte, Brazil
- Height: 1.74 m (5 ft 8 1/2 in)
- Position: Left back

Youth career
- 2011–2014: Cruzeiro

Senior career*
Years	Team	Apps	(Gls)
2014–2016	Cruzeiro	0	(0)
2015	→ Marítimo B (loan)	8	(1)
2015	→ Marítimo (loan)	0	(0)
2016	Villa Nova	6	(0)
2016–2017	Red Bull Brasil	3	(0)
2017	Patrocinense	8	(0)
2018	Arraial do Cabo	0	(0)
- * Club domestic league appearances and goals as of 02:03, 14 April 2022 (UTC)

Antônio Carlos Souza da Silva Júnior (born 17 September 1994), known as Antônio Carlos, is a Brazilian professional footballer who played as a left back.

== Football career ==
Born in Belo Horizonte, Minas Gerais, Antônio Carlos emerged through local Cruzeiro Esporte Clube's youth system. On 24 January 2015 he was loaned to Portuguese club C.S. Marítimo, but was all but associated to the B-team during his spell in Madeira, scoring through a penalty kick in a 1–1 away draw against Sporting Clube de Portugal B as they were eventually relegated from the Segunda Liga.
