= Maria Cândida Pereira Teixeira =

Angolan politician

- Born: Angola
- Occupation: Politician

Maria Cândida Pereira Teixeira is an Angolan politician. She is the current Minister of Education of Angola, as well as a member of parliament. She is the member of MPLA. She was Minister of Science and Technology.
