= Apiacá, Espírito Santo =

Apiacá Município de Apiacá
- Municipality
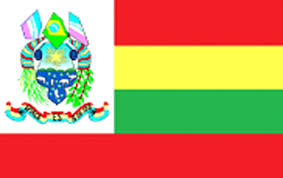
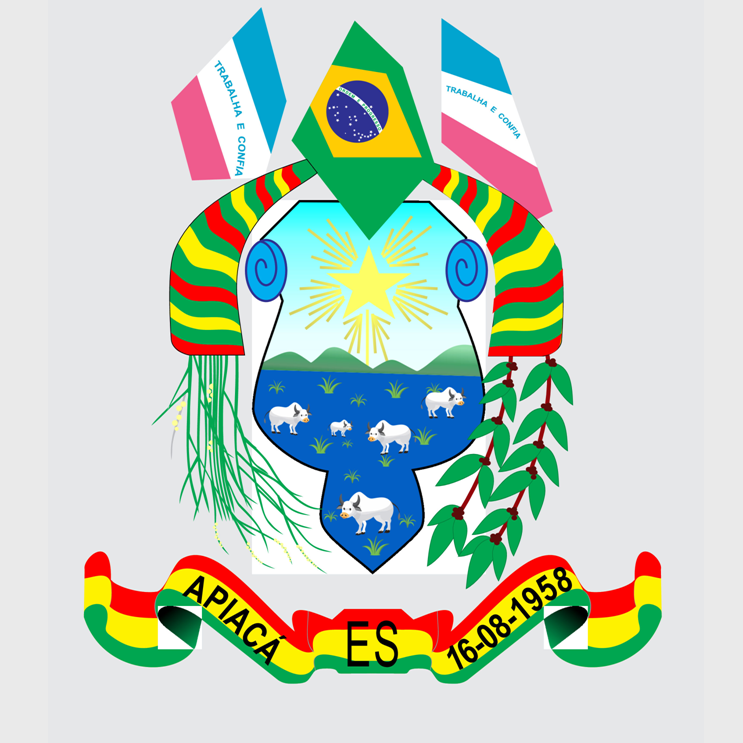
- Flag Coat of arms

- Location of Apiacá in Espírito Santo

- Location of Apiacá in Brazil
- Coordinates: 21°09′14″S 41°34′04″W
- Country: Brazil
- Region: Southeast
- Founded: August 16, 1958

Government
  - Mayor: Betinho (i.e., Humberto Alves de Souza; PRP, 2013–2016)

Area
  - Total: 194 km^{2} (75 sq mi)

Population (2020)
  - Total: 7,554
  - Density: 38.9/km^{2} (101/sq mi)
- Demonym: Apiacaense
- Time zone: UTC−3 (BRT)

Apiacá is a municipality located in the Brazilian state of Espírito Santo. It covers 194 km^{2} (75 mi^{2}), and has a population of 7,554 with a population density of 41 inhabitants per square kilometer.
