= Fernando Faustino Muteka =

Angolan politician

Personal details
- Born: January 24, 1944 (age 81) Bunjei, Chipindo, Huíla
- Political party: Popular Movement for the Liberation of Angola

Fernando Faustino Muteka was the Angolan minister for transport from 1978 to 1984.

Political offices
Preceded by Amílcar Saraiva de Figueiredo	Provincial Commissioner of Bié; 1977-1979	Succeeded by João Baptista Jamba Ya Mina
Preceded by	Minister of Transports and Communications -1983	Succeeded by Manuel Bernardo de Sousa
Preceded by Rafael Sapilinha Sambalanga	Provincial Commissioner of Namibe; 1983-1987	Succeeded by Domingos José
Preceded by Evaristo Domingos Kimba	Minister of Agriculture; 1987-1991	Succeeded by Isaac Francisco Maria dos Anjos
Preceded by Filomeno da Costa Alegre de Ceita	Secretary of State for Coffee; 1991-	Succeeded by
Preceded by	Minister of Territory Administration; 2002-2004	Succeeded by Virgílio de Fontes Pereira
Preceded by Albino Malungo	Governor of Huambo; 2009-2014	Succeeded by Kundi Paihama
