= Adão Francisco Correia de Almeida =

Angolan politician

President of the National Assembly
- Incumbent
- Assumed office 17 November 2025
- President: João Lourenço
- Preceded by: Carolina Cerqueira

Personal details
- Born: 13 May 1979 (age 47) Angola
- Occupation: Politician

Adão Francisco Correia de Almeida is an Angolan politician. He is the current Minister of Territory Administration and State Reform of Angola, as well as a member of parliament. He is a member of MPLA.
