= Eugénio César Laborinho =

Angolan politician

Minister of Interior
- Incumbent
- Assumed office July 25, 2019
- Governor: Cabinda Province (2017-2019)
- Vice President: Bornito de Sousa

Personal details
- Party: MPLA

Military service
- Rank: Lieutenant General

Eugénio César Laborinho (born January 10, 1955) is an Angolan Lieutenant General and politician of the People's Movement for the Liberation of Angola (MPLA); Governor of Cabinda Province; Minister of Interior of Angola since 2019.

== Early life and education ==
Eugénio César Laborinho, was born on January 10, 1955, in the province of Malanje, to Armando César Laborinho and Natália Ferreira de Andrade. Eugénio César Laborinho has a degree in Psychology since 1997, from the Institute of Education Sciences (ISCED), at the University Dr. Antonio Agostinho Neto.

== Professional career ==
He also completed a degree in psychology at the Higher Institute of Education (Instituto Superior de Ciências da Educação) of the Universidade Agostinho Neto (UAN) and graduated with a license (Licenciatura em Psicologia). He then became a member of the Psychological Society (Associação dos Psicólogos de Angola).

In 2017–2019, Laborinho served as Governor of Cabinda Province.

On July 24, 2019, President João Lourenço appointed him to succeed Ângelo de Barros Veiga Tavares as Minister of the Interior in his cabinet. At the VIII Congress, the Central Committee of the MPLA elected a Politburo consisting of 101 people, to which he also belongs.

== Political career ==
Eugénio César Laborinho has been the MPLA (People's Movement for the Liberation of Angola) activist.

== Military ranks ==
1976 – Promotion to the rank of 1st Lieutenant.

1980 – Promotion to the rank of Captain.

== Awards ==
2009 – Awarding of a Diploma of Merit for the services provided at the Ministry of Interior, during 30 years of service.
