= José Carvalho da Rocha =

Angolan politician

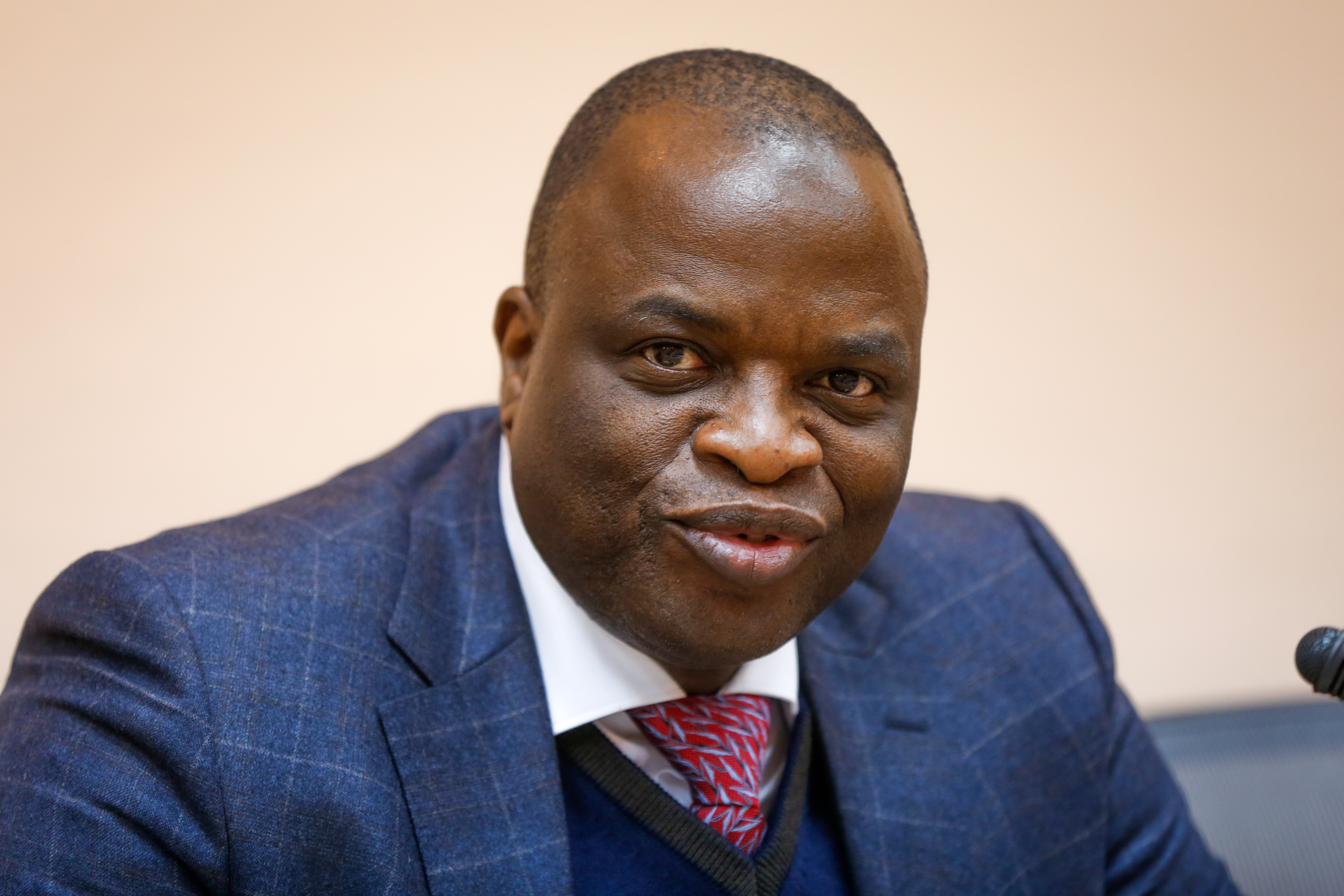
- Born: 30 March 1964
- Occupation: Politician
- Position held: Governor of Uíge (2020–), Minister of Telecommunications and Information Technologies of Angola (2017–2020), Minister of Telecommunications and Information Technologies of Angola (2008–2017)

José Carvalho da Rocha is an Angolan politician. He is the current Minister of Telecommunications and Information Technologies of Angola, as well as a member of parliament. He is a member of MPLA.
