= Ana Paula Sacramento Neto =

Angolan politician

- Born: Angola
- Occupation: Politician

Ana Paula Sacramento Neto is an Angolan politician. She is the current Minister of Youth and Sport of Angola, as well as a member of parliament. She is the member of MPLA.
