= Pedro de Morais Neto =

Angolan diplomat and military figure

Pedro de Morais Neto is an Angolan diplomat and military figure. From 1994 to 2008, he served as the chief of the National Air Force of Angola. On 16 January 2008, Neto became Ambassador to Zambia, presenting his credentials to Zambian President Levy Mwanawasa.
