= Paula Francisco Coelho =

Angolan politician (born 1981)

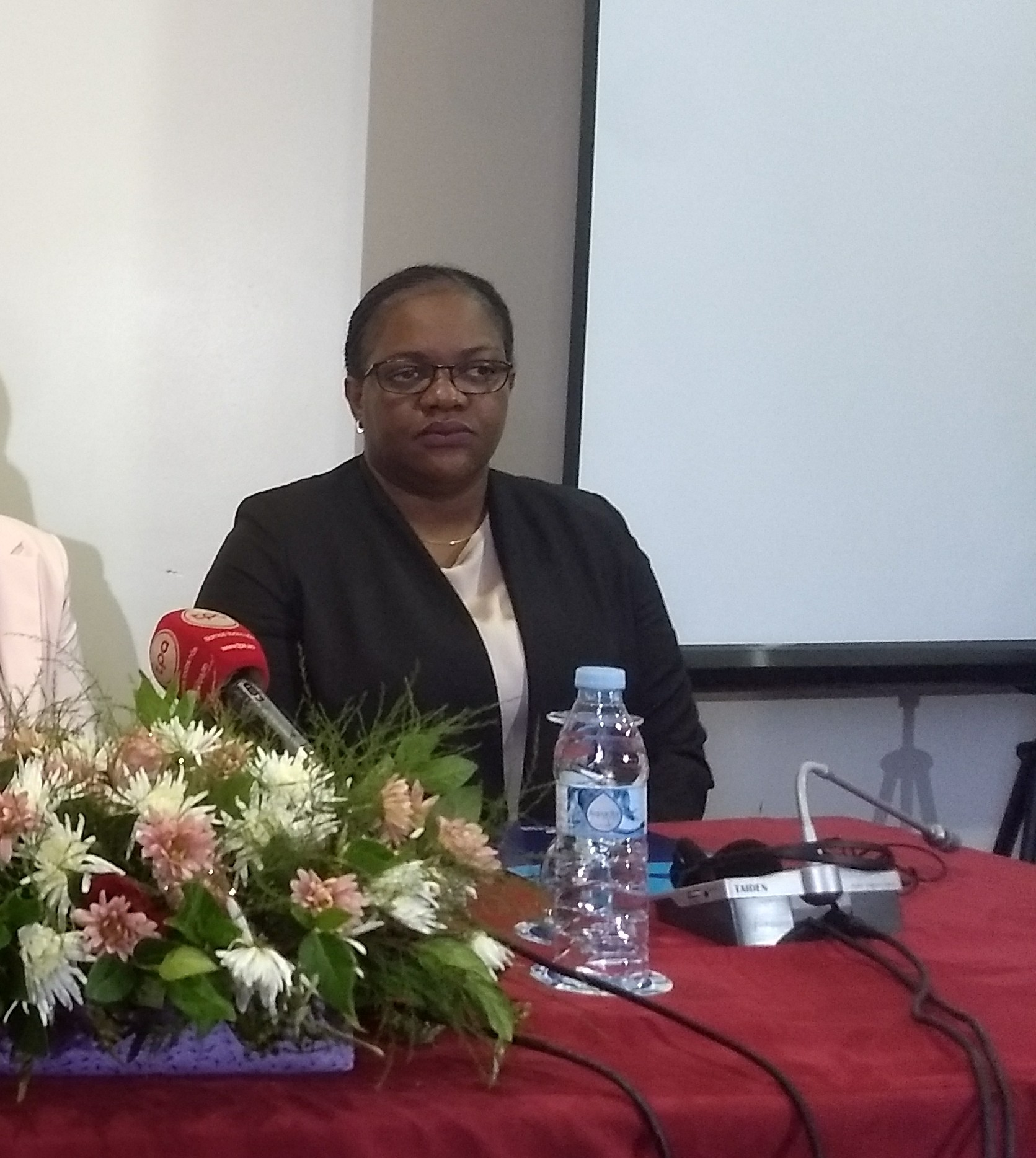

Paula Cristina Francisco Coelho (born July 7, 1981) was appointed the Minister of Environment of the Republic of Angola in September 2017 under João Lourenço Government. Prior to her mandate as Minister of Environment, she was the Secretary of State for Biodiversity and Protected Areas. She started her work with the Ministry of Environment as a technician, later becoming the National Director for Biodiversity.

During her extensive experience dealing with the environmental challenges in Angola, she coordinated several projects related to biodiversity, climate change, waste management, soil and water conservation. Paula Francisco holds a bachelor's degree in protected areas management from Tshwane University of Technology, South Africa. Born in Luanda, she is an active member of the Central Committee of the People's Movement for the Liberation of Angola and of the Angolan Women Organization.

The priorities in her mandate are the environmental education, the waste management and the strengthening of the policies related to wildlife.
