= Jesus Faria Maiato =

Angolan politician

- Born: Angola
- Occupation: Politician

Jesus Faria Maiato is an Angolan politician. He is the current Minister of Public Administration, Labour and Social Security of Angola, as well as a member of parliament. He is a member of MPLA.
