= Sílvia Lutucuta =

Angolan politician (born 1968)

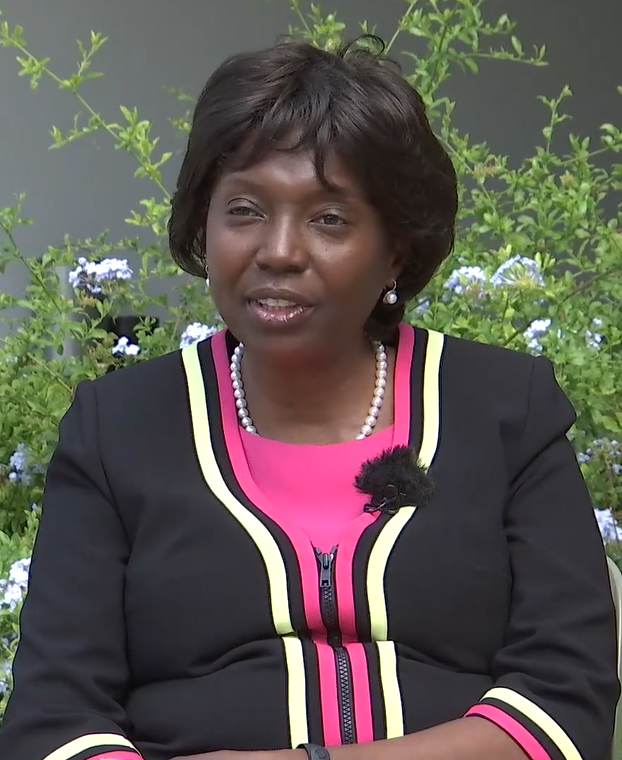
- Lutucuta in 2024
- Born: 14 July 1967 (age 59); Huambo, Portuguese Angola
- Other name: Sílvia Paula Valentim Lutucuta
- Education: Agostinho Neto University
- Occupations: Cardiologist and politician
- Known for: Angolan Minister of Health

Sílvia Paula Valentim Lutucuta (born 14 July 1968) is an Angolan politician and cardiologist, the Minister of Health from 2017.

== Early life and education ==
Lutucuta was born in Huambo in 1967. At the age of 16, She entered the Faculty of Medicine of Agostinho Neto University. She completed her degree in 1990, and graduated with honors. She was offered a scholarship for postgraduate studies. She specialized in cardiology at Hospital de Santa Maria, Lisbon, Portugal. In 2000 she moved to Houston in Texas where she undertook postdoctoral research at Baylor College of Medicine.

Lutacuta joined the Angolan Society of Cardiovascular Diseases. She is a member of the Member of the MPLA Political Bureau. In 2017 she was nominated to be the Minister of Health in Angola. She has created thousands of new jobs, especially in rural layers. Under her leadership vaccines for COVID-19 were rolled out in her country and she organised the funding.

In 2025 she was able to announce that over 900,000 people in Angola were going to be vaccinated against cholera using the oral vaccine Eurovisol. The ministry had about 1,000 teams backed up by volunteers. The epicentre of the outbreak was in Cacuaco and that was where the campaign was announced. People would be vaccinated in Luanda, Bengo and Icolo provinces. The speed of the response was welcomed by the UN Resident Coordinator in Angola, Dr Zahira Virani and Luís Nunes, Governor of the Province of Luanda. By July, a million people had been vaccinated in Cabinda, Kwanza Sul, Huíla, Lunda Norte, Namibe and Zaire with only babies under one year excluded. Lutacuta backed plans to get two million people vaccinated.
