= Marcos Alexandre Nhunga =

Angolan politician

- Born: Angola
- Occupation: Politician

Marcos Alexandre Nhunga is an Angolan politician. He is the current Minister of Agriculture and Forestry of Angola, as well as a member of parliament. He is a member of MPLA.
