= Politics of Angola =

The current political regime in Angola is presidentialism, in which the President of the Republic is also head of state and government; it is advised by a Council of Ministers, which together with the President form the national executive power. Legislative power rests with the 220 parliamentarians elected to the National Assembly. The President of the Republic, together with the parliament, appoints the majority of the members of the two highest bodies of the judiciary, that is, the Constitutional Court and the Supreme Court. The judiciary is made up of the Court of Auditors and the Supreme Military Court.

The Angolan government is composed of three branches of government: executive, legislative and judicial. For decades, political power has been concentrated in the presidency with the People's Movement for the Liberation of Angola.

== History ==
Since the adoption of a new constitution in 2010, the politics of Angola takes place in a framework of a presidential republic, whereby the President of Angola is both head of state and head of government, and of a multi-party system. Executive power is exercised by the government. Legislative power is vested in the President, the government and parliament.

Angola changed from a one-party Marxist-Leninist system ruled by the Popular Movement for the Liberation of Angola (MPLA), in place since independence in 1975, to a multiparty democracy based on a new constitution adopted in 1992. That same year the first parliamentary and presidential elections were held. The MPLA won an absolute majority in the parliamentary elections. In the presidential elections, President José Eduardo dos Santos won the first round election with more than 49% of the vote to Jonas Savimbi's 40%. A runoff election would have been necessary, but never took place. The renewal of civil war immediately after the elections, which were considered as fraudulent by UNITA, and the collapse of the Lusaka Protocol, created a split situation. To a certain degree the new democratic institutions worked, notably the National Assembly, with the active participation of UNITA's and the FNLA's elected MPs - while José Eduardo dos Santos continued to exercise his functions without democratic legitimation. However the armed forces of the MPLA (now the official armed forces of the Angolan state) and of UNITA fought each other until the leader of UNITA, Jonas Savimbi, was killed in action in 2002.

From 2002 to 2010, the system as defined by the constitution of 1992 functioned in a relatively normal way. The executive branch of the government was composed of the President, the Prime Minister and Council of Ministers. The Council of Ministers, composed of all ministers and vice ministers, met regularly to discuss policy issues. Governors of the 18 provinces were appointed by and served at the pleasure of the president. The Constitutional Law of 1992 established the broad outlines of government structure and the rights and duties of citizens. The legal system was based on Portuguese and customary law but was weak and fragmented. Courts operated in only 12 of more than 140 municipalities. A Supreme Court served as the appellate tribunal; a Constitutional Court with powers of judicial review was never constituted despite statutory authorization. In practice, power was more and more concentrated in the hands of the President who, supported by an ever-increasing staff, largely controlled parliament, government, and the judiciary.

The 26-year-long civil war has ravaged the country's political and social institutions. The UN estimates of 1.8 million internally displaced persons (IDPs), while generally the accepted figure for war-affected people is 4 million. Daily conditions of life throughout the country and specifically Luanda (population approximately 6 million) mirror the collapse of administrative infrastructure as well as many social institutions. The ongoing grave economic situation largely prevents any government support for social institutions. Hospitals are without medicines or basic equipment, schools are without books, and public employees often lack the basic supplies for their day-to-day work.

José Eduardo dos Santos stepped down as President of Angola after 38 years in 2017, being peacefully succeeded by João Lourenço, Santos' chosen successor. However, President João Lourenço started a campaign against corruption of the dos Santos era. In November 2017, Isabel dos Santos, the billionaire daughter of former President José Eduardo dos Santos, was fired from her position as head of the country's state oil company Sonangol. In August 2020, José Filomeno dos Santos, son of Angola's former president, was sentenced for five years in jail for fraud and corruption.

In August 2022, the ruling party, MPLA, won another outright majority and President Joao Lourenco won a second five-year term in the election. However, the election was the tightest in Angola's history.

== Executive branch ==
The 2010 constitution grants the President almost absolute power. Elections for the National assembly are to take place every five years, and the President is automatically the leader of the winning party or coalition. It is for the President to appoint (and dismiss) all of the following:

- The members of the government (state ministers, ministers, state secretaries and vice-ministers);
- The members of the Constitutional Court;
- The members of the Supreme Court;
- The members of the Court of Auditors;
- The members of the Military Supreme Court;
- The Governor and Vice-Governors of the National Angolan Bank;
- The General-Attorney, the Vice-General-Attorneys and their deputies (as well as the military homologous);
- The Governors of the provinces;
- The members of the Republic Council;
- The members of the National Security Council;
- The members of the Superior Magistrates Councils;
- The General Chief of the Armed Forces and his deputy;
- All other command posts in the military;
- The Police General Commander, and the 2nd in command;
- All other command posts in the police;
- The chiefs and directors of the intelligence and security organs.

The President is also provided a variety of powers, like defining the policy of the country. Even though it's not up to him/her to make laws (only to promulgate them and make edicts), the President is the leader of the winning party. The only "relevant" post that is not directly appointed by the President is the vice-president, which is the second in the winning party.

José Eduardo dos Santos stepped down as President of Angola after 38 years in 2017, being peacefully succeeded by João Lourenço, Santos' chosen successor.

== Legislative branch ==
The National Assembly (Assembleia Nacional) has 223 members, elected for a four-year term, 130 members by proportional representation, 90 members in provincial districts, and 3 members to represent Angolans abroad. The general elections in 1997 were rescheduled for 5 September 2008. The ruling party MPLA won 82% (191 seats in the National Assembly) and the main opposition party won only 10% (16 seats). The elections however have been described as only partly free but certainly not fair. A White Book on the elections in 2008 lists up all irregularities surrounding the Parliamentary elections of 2008.

== Judicial branch ==
Supreme Court (or "Tribunal da Relacao") judges of the Supreme Court are appointed by the president. The Constitutional Court, with the power of judicial review, contains 11 justices. Four are appointed by the President, four by the National Assembly, two by the Superior Council of the Judiciary, and one elected by the public.

== Administrative divisions ==
Angola has eighteen provinces: Bengo, Benguela, Bie, Cabinda, Cuando Cubango, Cuanza Norte, Cuanza Sul, Cunene, Huambo, Huila, Luanda, Lunda Norte, Lunda Sul, Malanje, Moxico, Namibe, Uige, Zaire

== Political pressure groups and leaders ==
Front for the Liberation of the Enclave of Cabinda or FLEC (Henrique N'zita Tiago; António Bento Bembe)

- note: FLEC is waging a small-scale, highly factionalized, armed struggle for the independence of Cabinda Province

== International organization participation ==
African, Caribbean and Pacific Group of States, AfDB, CEEAC, United Nations Economic Commission for Africa, FAO, Group of 77, IAEA, IBRD, ICAO, International Criminal Court (signatory), ICFTU, International Red Cross and Red Crescent Movement, International Development Association, IFAD, IFC, IFRCS, International Labour Organization, International Monetary Fund, International Maritime Organization, Interpol, IOC, International Organization for Migration, ISO (correspondent), ITU, Non-Aligned Council (temporary), UNCTAD, UNESCO, UNIDO, UPU, World Customs Organization, World Federation of Trade Unions, WHO, WIPO, WMO, WToO, WTrO

== See also ==
- Government of the Republic of Angola
