= List of universities in Angola =

This is a list of notable universities in Angola.

== Public ==
- Agostinho Neto University, Talatona
- Cuito Cuanavale University, Menongue
- José Eduardo dos Santos University, Huambo
- Katyavala Bwila University, Benguela
- Kimpa Vita University, Uíge
- Lueji A'Nkonde University, Dundo
- Mandume ya Ndemufayo University, Lubango
- University of Namibe, Moçâmedes
- University of Luanda, Luanda
- 11 de Novembro University, Cabinda
- Rainha Njinga a Mbandi University, Malanje

== Private ==
- Universidade Católica de Angola, Luanda
- Universidade Jean Piaget de Angola, Portuguese university based in Luanda and Benguela
- Universidade Lusíada, Portuguese-backed university with campuses in Luanda, Benguela and Cabinda
- Universidade Óscar Ribas, Luanda, abbreviated as UOR
