= Mandume ya Ndemufayo University =

Public university in Lubango, Angola

Coordinates: 14.91982281153531°S 13.485701429588165°E

- Type: Public research university
- Established: 10 June 1974; 52 years ago
- Rector: Orlando Manuel José Fernandes da Mata
- Location: Lubango, Angola
- Campus: Urban
- Website: www.umn.ed.ao

Mandume ya Ndemufayo University (Portuguese: Universidade Mandume ya Ndemufayo) is a public university in Lubango, Angola, established in 1963 named after the late Kwanyama King Mandume ya Ndemufayo. The university emerged from the dismemberment of the Lubango campus of the Agostinho Neto University in the midst of the reforms in Angolan higher education that occurred in the years 2008 and 2009.

It has its area of operation restricted to the provinces of Huíla and Namibia.

== History ==
The historical tradition of UMN is intertwined with the creation of the "General University Studies of Angola" (initiated in Luanda in 1962). With the intention of expanding its scope, on August 5, 1963, the creation of a campus in Lubango (then Sá da Bandeira) was promulgated. However, campus classes would only begin on November 4 of this same year, with the beginning of classes in the Pedagogical Sciences course. In 1966, the Lubango campus became the "Delegation of General Studies of Angola in Sá da Bandeira", offering the university courses of preparation of teachers of the 8th and 11th groups of Higher Education. Later the courses of preparation were extinct to give place to free colleges. In 1968, the Delegation of Sá da Bandeira was linked to the "University of Luanda".

In June 1974, High Commissioner Silva Cardoso and the then Minister of Education of the Transitional Government deployed the University of Luanda in three universities, with the local delegation becoming the University of Sa da Bandeira. He was appointed to head the new university as rector of the geography doctor José Guilherme Fernandes and as deputy rector engineer Abílio Fernandes, but this configuration lasted a short time, and from 1976 the "Lubango Delegation" is now linked to the new University of Angola (now Agostinho Neto University ), already in the midst of the independence of the country. In that same year he loses the Mathematics faculty, and the campus of Lubango is only with the Faculty of Letters. The Faculty of Letters was abolished in 1980 to give place to the Higher Institute of Education Science (ISCED) in Lubango, by decree nº 95 of August 30 of the Council of Ministers.

In 2008/2009, according to the Government of Angola's program for higher education, in accordance with article 16 of Decree No. 7/09 of May 12, the University Mandume and Ndemufayo (UMN) is created as Public Education Institution Superior, from the elevation of the ISCED of Lubango. The UMN itself was able to undergo a new institution of higher education, when, by Decree-Law n. 188/14, of August 4, 2014, approved by the Council of Ministers, the University Cuíto Cuanavale was created, starting from the elevation of the old campus (and faculty) of this one in the locality of Cuito Cuanavale . The UMN is structured in organic units (Faculties, Institutes and Schools), these in turn organized in departments of education and research where several courses and specialties are given in several areas of scientific knowledge, at the undergraduate level.

== See also ==
- History of education in Angola
- History of education in Namibia
- Schools in Luanda
- Universities in Angola
