= Education in Angola =

National education budget
- Budget: 3.50% of GDP (127th)

General details
- Primary languages: Portuguese

Literacy (2024)
- Total: 72,6
- Male: 79,6
- Female: 66,0

Education in Angola has six years of compulsory education, under the Angolan Education Law (13/01) of 31 December 2001. Basic adult literacy continues to be low. According to the 2024 Census, the literacy rate in Angola was 72.6%. On the other hand, the university system has been developing considerably over the last decade.

The Human Rights Measurement Initiative (HRMI) finds that Angola achieved only 36.7% of what was possible at its income level to ensure that the right to education was being fulfilled, with such a score labeling the country's performance as being in the "very bad" range. HRMI breaks down the right to education by looking at the rights to both primary education and secondary education. While taking into consideration Angola's income level, Angola is doing only 61.4% of what should be possible for primary education and only 12.0% for secondary education.

== History ==
African access to educational opportunities was highly limited for most of the colonial period. Many rural Angolan populations of the vast countryside retained their native culture and language and were not able to speak nor understand Portuguese. In mainland Portugal, the homeland of the colonial authorities who ruled Angola from the 16th century until 1975, by the end of the 19th century the illiteracy rates were at over 80 percent and higher education was reserved for a small percentage of the population as well. 68.1 percent of mainland Portugal's population was still classified as illiterate by the 1930 census. Mainland Portugal's literacy rate by the 1940s and early 1950s was low for North American and Western European standards at the time. Only in the mid-1960s did the country make public education available for all children between the ages of six and twelve, and the overseas territories profited from this new education developments and change in policy at Lisbon.

In Angola, until the 1950s, facilities run by the government were few for such a large territory and restricted to the urban areas. Responsibility for educating Africans rested with Roman Catholic and Protestant missions. As a consequence, each of the missions established its own school system, and the children were educated in Portuguese language and culture. This centuries-long missionary educational endeavor in Portuguese Angola was subject to Portuguese coordination with pedagogical and organizational matters. Education beyond the primary level was available to very few black Africans before 1960, and the proportion of the age group that went on to secondary school in the early 1970s was quite low compared to the white Angolans (as well as comparing urban versus rural Angolans of all ethnicities). Nevertheless, primary school attendance was growing substantially.

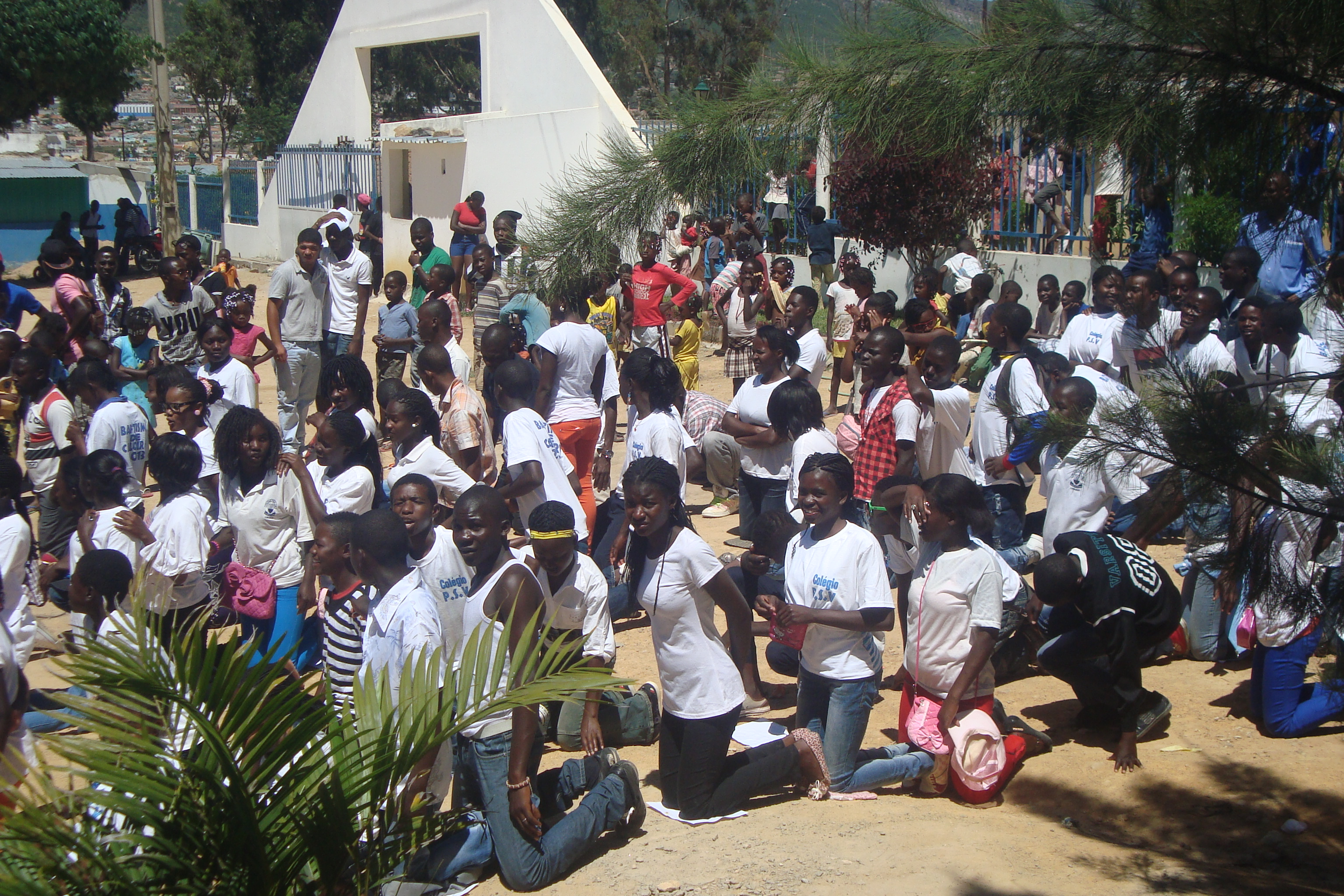
Students during recreational activity at the premises of the P.S.V. College, in Lubango, in 2011.

In general, the quality of teaching at the primary level was reasonable, despite instruction carried out largely by Africans with very few qualifications. Most secondary school teachers were Portuguese. In 1962, the first university established in Angola was founded by the Portuguese authorities — Estudos Gerais Universitários de Angola. This first Angolan university awarded a range of degrees from engineering to medicine. In 1968, it was renamed Universidade de Luanda (“University of Luanda”).

The conflict between the Portuguese military and the nationalist guerrillas, the Portuguese Colonial War (1961–1974), did not damage effectively this strong education growth started in the late 1950s. However, the Angolan Civil War (1975–2002) that ensued after independence left the education system in chaos and the progress achieved in the last two decades was seriously damaged. With the independence and the eruption of the civil war, most Portuguese had left (including virtually all secondary school staff), many buildings had been damaged, and availability of instructional materials was limited.

A report of the First Party Congress published in December 1977 gave education high priority. The government estimated the level of illiteracy following independence at between 85 percent and 90 percent and set the elimination of illiteracy as an immediate task. By 1985, after a major literacy campaign, the average rate of adult literacy was officially estimated at 59 percent; United States government sources, however, estimated literacy at only 20 percent. At independence there were 25,000 primary school teachers, but fewer than 2,000 were even minimally qualified to teach primary school children. The shortage of qualified instructors was more pronounced at the secondary school level, where there were only 600 teachers. Furthermore, secondary schools existed only in towns. The First Party Congress responded to this problem by resolving to institute an eight-year compulsory system of free, basic education for children between ages seven and fifteen.

School enrollment, which rose very slowly considering Angola's youthful population, reflected the dire effects of the insurgency. In 1977 the government reported that more than 1 million primary school students were enrolled, as were about 105,000 secondary school students, roughly double the numbers enrolled in 1973. What proportions of the relevant age groups these students constituted was not known. In the case of the primary school students, it may have been almost two-thirds; in that of secondary school students, it was perhaps a tenth to an eighth. Official government statistics released in 1984 showed that primary school enrollment had declined to 870,410, while secondary school enrollment (including vocational school and teacher training students) had increased to 151,759. This made for combined primary and secondary school enrollment consisting of 49 percent of the school-age population. By 1986 the primary school enrollment had increased to 1,304,145.

After the independence of Angola from Portugal in 1975, the Portuguese-built University of Luanda was refounded as the Universidade de Angola (University of Angola) in 1979 as a successor of the higher education institutions created during the Portuguese colonial administration. This included other institutions like the faculty of agricultural sciences based in the central Angolan town of Huambo which was known before independence by its many educational facilities, especially the Portuguese-founded Agricultural Research Institute that currently belongs to the Faculty of Agricultural Sciences of the Agostinho Neto University. The University of Luanda, founded in 1962, became known by its current title in 1985 to honor the first president of Angola, Agostinho Neto. In 1984, Luanda's Agostinho Neto University, the country's only university, had an enrolment of 4,493 students. This number had declined to 3,195 by 1986. A total of 72,330 people were enrolled in primary adult education programs in 1986.

The government began implementation of its education plan in close cooperation with its allies, particularly Cuba and the Soviet Union. Hundreds of Cuban and Soviet teachers traveled to Angola to teach, and about 5,000 Angolan students studied in Cuba or the Soviet Union. Despite the government's efforts, the UNITA insurgency prevented the construction of a new education system on the remains of that inherited from the Portuguese. Between 1977 and the mid-1980s, school enrolment declined, reflecting the dire effects of the insurgency. The demands of the war had drained funds that could otherwise have been applied to building schools, printing books, and purchasing equipment. Fighting also disrupted the education of hundreds of thousands of children.

A number of Angolan organizations become active during the 1980s in the quest for better educational facilities. In 1987 the JMPLA launched a special campaign to recruit 1,000 young people to teach in primary schools in Luanda Province. The groups targeted by the campaign included secondary school and higher education graduates, as well as some workers. The OMA sponsored programs to teach women to read and write and was involved in programs to reduce infant mortality and promote family planning. Even the military formed a special group in 1980, the eighth contingent of the Comrade Dangereux Brigade, whose basic function was to teach primary school; 6,630 brigade members were reported to have taught 309,419 students by 1987.

In 1988, according to the United States Center for Defense Information, the Angolan government spent more per capita on the military (US$892) than on education (US$310). The war in the southern and central regions of the country prevented the spread of the school system; the consequences of the fighting, including UNITA attacks on schools and teachers and the massive displacement of rural populations in those areas, disrupted the education of hundreds of thousands of children. Further damaging to Angola's future was that many of those studying abroad had either failed to complete their courses of study or had not returned to Angola.

After independence from Portugal in 1975, Angolan students continued to be admitted to Portuguese high schools, polytechnical institutes and universities, through bilateral agreements between the Portuguese and the Angolan governments, most of them belong to the Angolan elites. However, many of those studying in European countries like Portugal and Russia failed to complete their courses of study or had not returned to Angola.

Release of UNICEF's 1999 annual report on The State of the World's Children predicted that illiteracy rates would escalate in the following century because one out of four children in the poorest nations would not be in school. By 1998, Angola alone had more than 50% of its children under age 12 who did not attend school.

Although by law, education in Angola is compulsory and free for eight years, the government reports that a certain percent of students are not in school due to a lack of school buildings and teachers. Students are often responsible for paying for additional school-related expenses, including fees for books and supplies. In 1999, the gross primary enrolment rate was 74 percent; in 1998 (the most recent year for which data are available) the net primary enrolment rate was 61 percent. Gross and net enrolment ratios are based on the number of students formally registered in primary school and do not necessarily reflect school attendance.

There continue to be significant disparities in enrolment between rural and urban areas. In 1995, 71.2 percent of children ages 7 to 14 years were attending school. It is reported that higher percentages of boys attend school than girls. During the Angolan Civil War (1975–2002), nearly half of all schools were reportedly looted and destroyed, leading to problems with overcrowding. The Ministry of Education hired 20,000 new teachers in 2005, and continued to implement teacher training. Teachers tend to be underpaid, inadequately trained, and overworked (sometimes teaching two or three shifts a day). Teachers reportedly demanded payment or bribes directly from their students. Other factors, such as the presence of landmines, lack of resources and identity papers, and poor health prevent children from regularly attending school. Although budgetary allocations for education were increased in 2004, the education system in Angola continues to be extremely under-funded.

Literacy is quite low, with 67.4% of the population over the age of 15 able to read and write in Portuguese. 82.9% of males and 54.2% of women are literate as of 2001.

In Angola in 1999–2000, the gross primary enrollment rate was approximately 74 percent and the net primary enrolment rate was approximately 30 percent. In provinces hardest hit by the war, gross enrolment rates averaged less than 40 percent. In 2002, 26 percent of children who were enrolled in primary school reached grade 4. Rates of enrolment, retention, and completion in Angola tend to be lower among girls.

When the civil war ended in 2002, Angola's education infrastructure was in disarray. Several programs started after the end of the civil war were expected to improve education in Angola. In 2004, the government concluded its national child registration campaign, which documented 3.8 million children under the age of 18 years since August 2002. UNICEF and the Government of Angola expanded their existing Back-to-School campaign by recruiting and training 29,000 new primary school teachers for the 2004 school year. As a result, student enrollment has increased by nearly 1 million, primarily in grades 1 through 4. The program is developing into an Education for All Program. In April 2004, the Ministry of Education held public consultations on the proposed National Plan of Action for Education for All.

Many areas of rapid resettlement, areas hardest hit by the Angolan Civil War (1975–2002), and remote rural areas continue to lack basic social services, including education. This absence of services has led to an increased migration to municipal and provincial capitals, where basic services and schools are operating beyond capacity. Although primary school construction has received significant support from donors, many of these newly constructed schools lack qualified teachers, curricula, staff, and much-needed resources and support. Viable non-formal education, accelerated education, vocational training, and other alternative education opportunities are scarce, and lack qualified teachers, staff, resources and support.

Years of conflict have left many students, including former child soldiers, severely traumatized and physically disabled. Abuse experienced by many abducted and war-affected girls has left them especially vulnerable and some with young children requiring care during school hours. During the conflict, many students missed years of schooling, resulting in classrooms populated by many overage students. For these young people, the services that are available to them are often inadequate to meet their special needs.

Some teacher training and community programs have included special training for adults working with former child soldiers, war-affected children, and children engaged in or at risk of engaging in the worst forms of child labour. Some social protection and education programs, curricula, policies, and resources have been revised and made more suitable for this population. However, there continues to be a need for more relevant and adequate teaching techniques; resources, curricula, and teaching tools; formal, vocational, and alternative educational programs; life skills training; social services; community support; education and social policies and programs; and opportunities for young people to develop into productive and responsible citizens.

== Current status of primary education ==
After the end of the Angolan Civil War in 2002, and with the oil price increases in the late 2000s, the Angolan Government was able to collect huge financial resources from taxes on oil and diamond extraction profits. This increase of the governmental budget plus the end of the armed conflict allowed a new opportunity to expand and improve Angola's education system. Angola's Education Ministry requested the implementation of the "Cuban system" (a Cuban teaching method) beginning in March 2009 in the provinces of Luanda, Benguela, Huambo and Bié, to be afterward extended to other areas of the nation. The method will be first implemented on February in Luanda, as an experimental project, for which a group of 10 teachers from Cuba will travel to the African nation in the first months of 2009. The Angolan leaders were looking to eliminate widespread illiteracy before 2014 or at least reduce it to a minimal extent by that year.

== Higher education ==
Immediately after independence, the colonial Universidade de Luanda was renamed Universidade de Angola, and in 1979 Universidade Agostinho Neto (UAN). In 1998 the Catholic Church founded, also in Luanda, the Universidade Católica de Angola (UCAN). Over the years, the UAN came to consist of about 40 faculties dispersed over most of the territory. In the wake of political liberalization, private universities began to spring up in the 2000s. Some of these were linked to universities in Portugal — Universidade Lusíada, Universidade Lusófona and Universidade Jean Piaget — all of them in Luanda. Others were endogenous initiatives: Universidade Privada de Angola (Luanda and Lubango), Universidade Técnica de Angola (Luanda), Universidade Metodista (Luanda), Universidade Metropolitana (Luanda) and Instituto Superior de Ciências Sociais e Relações Internacionais (Luanda). The creation of an Islamic university in Luanda was announced by Saudi Arabia. In 2009, the UAN split up: while it still exists under the same name in Luanda and Bengo province, the faculties in Benguela, Cabinda, Huambo, Lubango, Malanje and Uíge now constitute autonomous public universities.

== See also ==
- List of schools in Angola
- List of universities in Angola
- Angolan Civil War
