= Cabinda (city) =

Cabinda Chioua
- Municipality and city
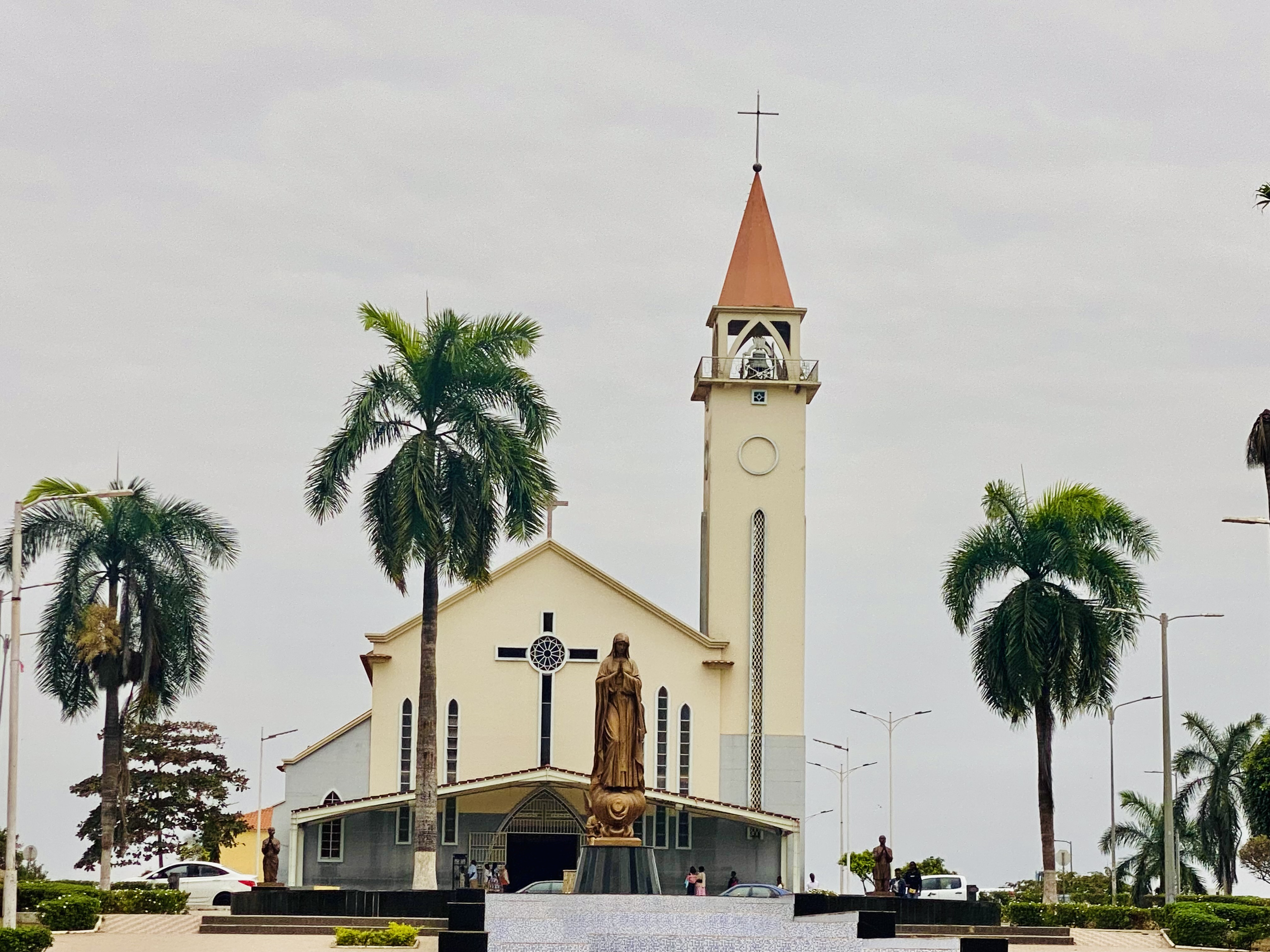
- Pedro Benge square

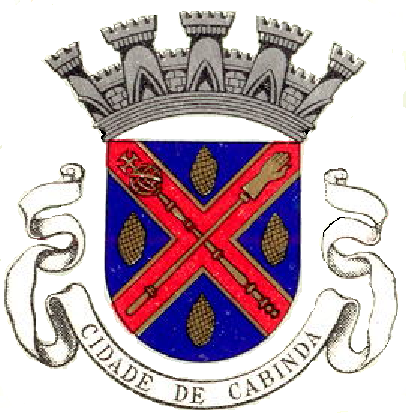
- Seal

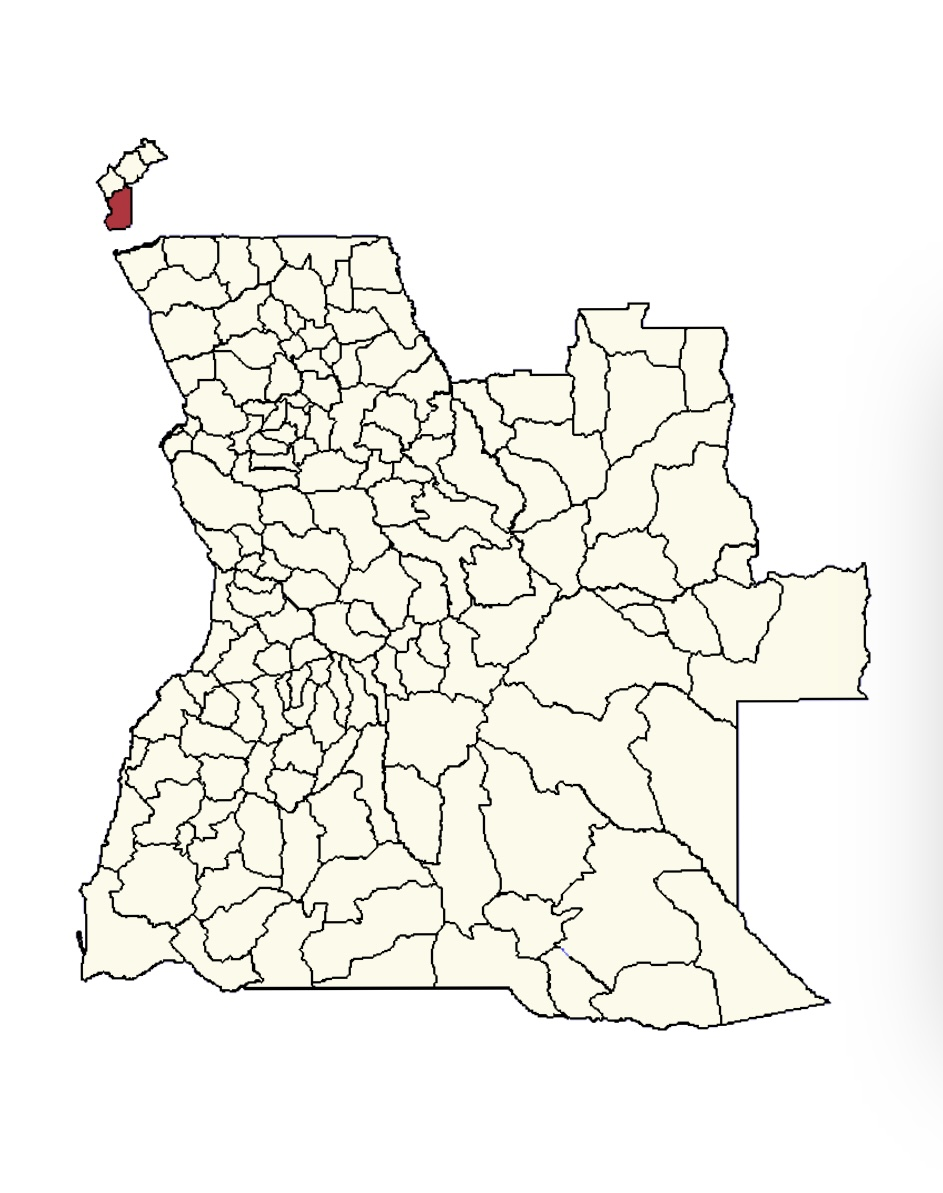
- Cabinda

- Location in Angola
- Coordinates: 5°33′36″S 12°11′24″E
- Country: Angola
- Province: Cabinda Province
- Founded: 1883
- City Status: 1956

Area
  - Total: 2,273 km^{2} (878 sq mi)
- Elevation: 24 m (79 ft)

Population (mid 2020)
  - Total: 739,182
  - Density: 325.2/km^{2} (842.3/sq mi)
- Time zone: UTC+1 (WAT)
- Climate: Aw

Cabinda, also known as Chioua, is a city and a municipality in the Cabinda Province, an exclave of Angola. It is the administrative capital of Cabinda. Angolan sovereignty over Cabinda is disputed by the secessionist Republic of Cabinda. The city of Cabinda had a population of 550,000 and the municipality a population of 624,646, at the 2014 Census. The residents of the city are known as Cabindas or Fiotes. Cabinda, due to its proximity to rich oil reserves, serves as one of Angola's main oil ports. With a territorial area of 1,823 km², it is the most populous municipality in the province and the ninth most populous in the country.

There are considerable offshore oil reserves nearby.

Cabinda emerged around the year 1490, its formation largely influenced by its geography (the Bay of Cabinda), which allowed the construction of a busy port. It later became a Portuguese trading post in 1620 and was turned into a Portuguese fortification in 1783, which contributed to the concentration of a political-military class and administrative services, granting it a zone of influence. However, it was from 1887 onward—when it became the seat of an administrative district, capital of the Congo district (now the province of Uíge) and of the Portuguese Congo Protectorate—that Cabinda effectively became the central city of the area. In 1919 it finally became the capital of Cabinda Province and was elevated to the category of city on 28 May 1956. After Angolan independence, it retained its status as a provincial capital.

== Etymology ==
According to the historian and priest Joaquim Martins, the name "Cabinda" originates from the combination of the term "Mafuca" with the proper name "Binda". The agglutination of the last syllable of the word "Mafuca"—which in the former kingdoms of Loango, Cacongo and Angoio-Nagoio referred to a kind of chief trade official and dignitary of the king responsible for commercial transactions—joined with "Binda", the name of the mafuca at that time. This chief trade official named Binda was therefore an important public functionary responsible for matters of interest between the native kingdoms and the Portuguese.

In the 19th century, the city was also referred to as "Porto Rico", "Vila Amélia" and "Palmar".

Chioua Chimuisi, another designation given to the city of Cabinda, derives from Tchowa, meaning "large fish market", a name recorded for the locality at the beginning of the colonial era when it was still only a fishing village, and Tchimuisi, referring to a legend of a mermaid said to inhabit the surroundings of Chioua.

== History ==
In 1490 Cabinda consisted of a small settlement of fishermen and hunters living along the seashore. From around 1530 onward it became the most important maritime outlet of the Kingdom of Cacongo, one of the confederated states of the Kingdom of Kongo.

From the 17th century onward Cabinda gradually became a commercial settlement, with the presence of a Portuguese trading post established in 1620 for the trade of enslaved people, lubongo cloth, salt and timber. The trading post in the settlement was so important that it justified the Cabinda expedition, in 1723, when a Luso-Brazilian alliance attacked British positions and defeated them.

In 1783 the Portuguese reached an agreement with the authorities of Cacongo for the construction of the Fort of Santa Maria de Cabinda. The fort was destroyed the following year after a joint incursion by the Angoio, Cacongo and France. The attack was successful but ushered in a period of instability for the locality until the end of the Napoleonic Wars, when the Kingdom of Angoio began a process of political fragmentation and distanced itself from the city of Cabinda.

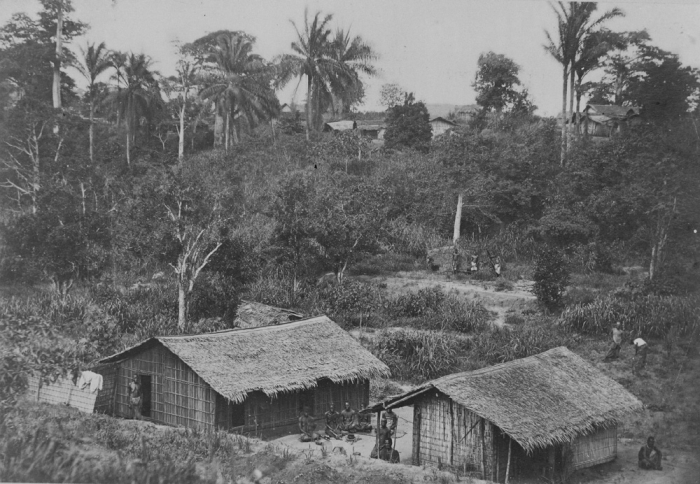
Huts in Cabinda in 1890

The definitive end of the slave trade through the Cabinda port in the 1840s exposed the financial difficulties of the Kingdom of Cacongo, which became increasingly dependent on trade with the Fortaleza de Cabinda and on the busy local port that handled fish, textiles, salt and timber.

The city was formally founded by the Portuguese in 1883 after the signing of the Treaty of Simulambuco, in the same period as the Berlin Conference. Cabinda was an embarkation point for slaves to Brazil. By 1883 Cabinda had already become an important maritime and commercial town on the Atlantic Ocean for Portuguese West Africa, located in a calm bay and a vital navigation point near the mouth of the Congo River. Until the end of the 19th century the area corresponding to the present-day interior of the municipality was extremely poor and unhealthy, which caused the population to concentrate increasingly along the coastal strip. The increase in port trade favored urban development, exchanges of goods related to maritime activity and other auxiliary services.

On 1 February 1885, seven kilometers north of the city center—where a monument now stands—the Treaty of Simulambuco was signed, recognizing the Cabinda region as a Portuguese protectorate. In 1885 it began to be referred to as Porto Rico.

In 1887 Cabinda became the seat of an administrative district. On 31 May 1887 the town simultaneously became the capital of the newly created "Congo District" (present-day Uíge Province) and of the "Portuguese Congo Protectorate". In July 1890 it was elevated to the status of town (vila), and in 1896 its name was changed to Vila Amélia.

It remained the capital of both entities until 1917, when the district headquarters was transferred to Maquela do Zombo and the protectorate was fully absorbed and subsequently abolished. In 1919 the town of Cabinda became the capital of the Cabinda district (now the province of the same name).

It was elevated to the category of city on 28 May 1956 by legislative order no. 2,757, proposed by the Portuguese governor of the Congo district, Jaime Pereira de Sampaio Forjaz de Serpa Pimentel. City status better matched its legal-administrative role as a provincial district capital. From that year onward the city concentrated government support services, local boards, municipal commissions and the municipal council, transforming Cabinda's administrative landscape.

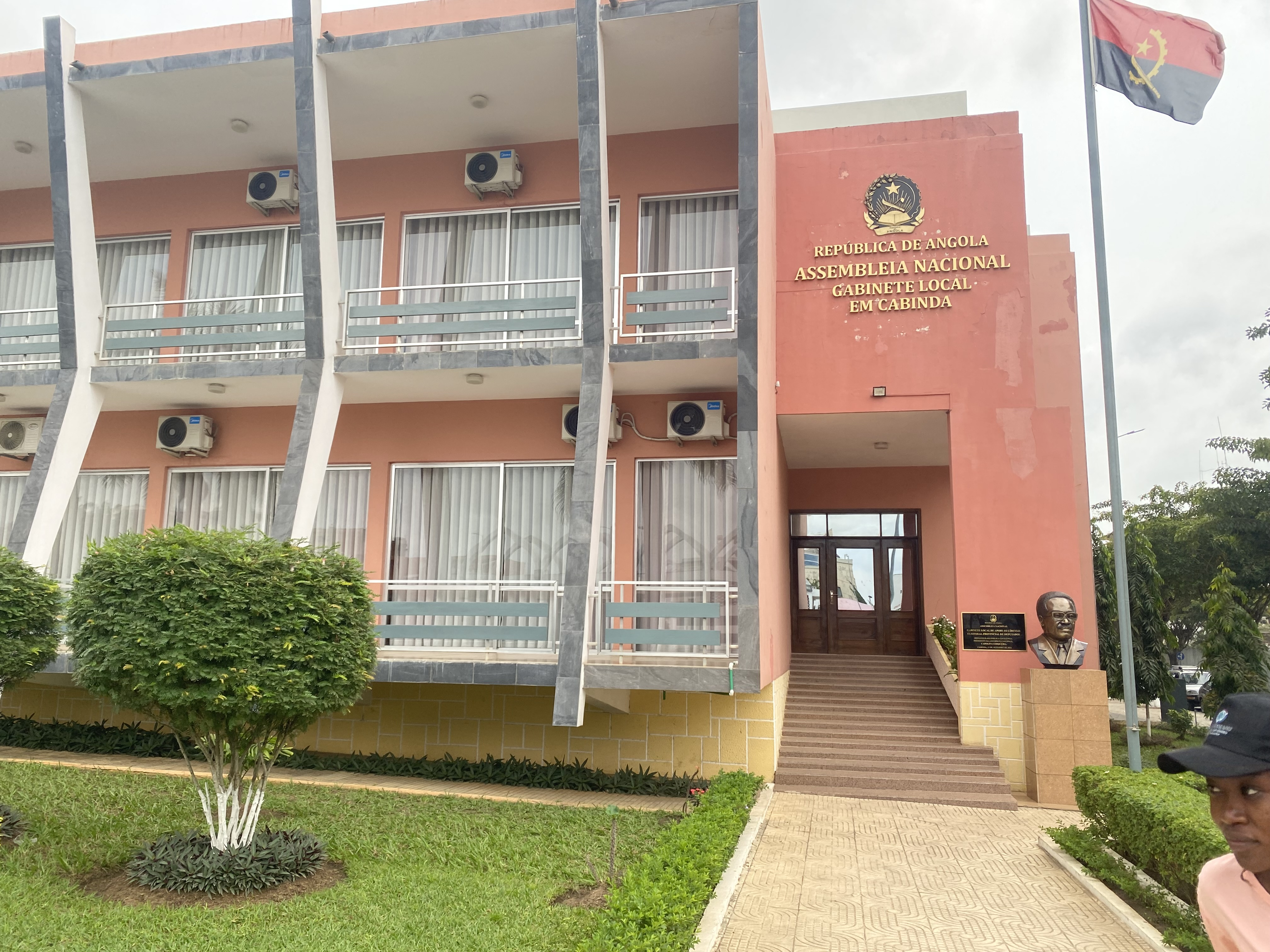
Gabinete Local de Cabinda, the offices of deputies from Cabinda elected to the National Assembly of Angola, in 2024

After the Carnation Revolution of 25 April 1974 in Portugal, the city came under the control of the People's Movement for the Liberation of Angola (MPLA) during the Miconje–Cabinda military campaign. In 1975, on the eve of national independence, intense fighting occurred in the Antó-Iema border battle against the joint forces of the National Liberation Front of Angola (FNLA) and the Zairean army. After repelling the border incursion, MPLA forces engaged in the Battle of Morro do Chizo in the southern area of Cabinda against FNLA units positioned on the banks of the Lucola River, defeating their rivals. The city of Cabinda thus became the focus of the main military efforts in the province between 1974 and 1976, particularly in the Battle of Morro do Chizo, and became a heavily fortified military point, serving as the main base of the Angolan Armed Forces during the Cabinda conflict.

After the victory of the Angolan state in 1976, the Cabinda conflict moved away from the capital and was reduced to sporadic actions near the border with the Democratic Republic of the Congo. To demonstrate the city's capacity for organization and integration, the Angolan government held the First Anti-Imperialist Solidarity Sports Games in February 1976 in Cabinda and three other provincial capitals. This was the first sporting event in which Angola participated with its own teams and the first international event hosted by Angola, receiving athletes and delegations from six countries.

On 21 April 1990, after more than a decade of relative calm, a grenade attack occurred at a market in Cabinda, injuring 24 people. The Front for the Liberation of the Enclave of Cabinda (FLEC) claimed responsibility.

In July 1999 Cabinda hosted, for the first time, a continental sporting event, the African Men's Basketball Championship (AfroBasket '99), where the Angola men's national basketball team won the title. Another major sporting event held in the city was the 2010 Africa Cup of Nations, centered on Cabinda's largest and most modern sports facility, the Estádio Nacional do Chiazi. However, FLEC used the occasion to carry out a terrorist attack, attacking the bus transporting the Togo national football team, killing the driver, a member of the technical staff and a journalist.

The administrative-territorial reform of 2024 caused Cabinda to cede part of its territory to create the municipalities of Liambo and Angoio.

== Geography ==
Cabinda is located on the Atlantic Ocean coast in the south of Cabinda Province, and sits on the right bank of the Bele River.

According to the Köppen climate classification, Cabinda is a tropical savanna climate.

It is 56 kilometres (35 mi) north of Moanda (Congo-Kinshasa), 70 kilometres (43 mi) north of Congo River estuary and 137 kilometres (85 mi) south of Pointe-Noire (Congo-Brazzaville).

The municipality covers 1,823 km², and its main geographical feature is the Cabinda Bay, which covers almost the entire coastal strip of the city. It is bordered to the north by the municipality of Liambo, to the east by the Democratic Republic of the Congo, to the south by the municipality of Angoio, and to the west by the Atlantic Ocean. The city is located at the coordinates 5°33′ south and 12°12′ east, at an altitude of 24 metres.

The municipality is dominated by the ecoregion of the "Angolan scarp savanna and woodlands", with portions of "Atlantic equatorial forests" in the easternmost areas.

=== Administrative divisions ===
Until September 2024 the municipality of Cabinda was divided into three communes: Cabinda (the municipal seat), Malembo and Tando Zinze. On 5 September 2024 part of the municipality of Cabinda was separated to form the municipalities of Angoio, Liambo and Tando Zinze.

After the subdivision, the city was organized into the following neighbourhoods: Centro, Ponta do Farol, A Vitória é Certa, Lombo-Lombo, Luvassa, 1 de Maio, Mongo Balança, Povo Grande, Ambaca, Baixa da Cidade, Resistência, Lúcio Tchiweka, Morro do Chizo, Zangoio, Mangue Seco and Emcica.

=== Demographics ===
The municipality has 699,053 inhabitants and a territorial area of 1,823 km², making it the most populous municipality in the province and the eighth most populous in the country. For comparison with its significant demographic growth, in the census conducted on 15 December 1970 the locality had 21,124 inhabitants. Of the municipality's population, 46.8% are men and 53.2% are women.

The population of Cabinda is predominantly of the Kongo ethnic group, particularly the Ibinda subgroup, coexisting with minorities of Ambundu, Ovimbundu and Chokwe, many of whom arrived through migration associated with the economic dynamism of the oil industry and with internal displacement caused by wars. There are also Luso-Angolan subgroups, migrants from the Kinshasa area of the Democratic Republic of the Congo, migrants from Brazzaville, and Chinese communities. This diverse composition gives Cabinda a uniquely cosmopolitan demographic configuration within the province.

The main language spoken in the city is Portuguese, alongside Ibinda (also called Fiote).

== Language ==
Since Portugal colonized Cabinda later than the rest of Angola, Portuguese, the official language of Angola, is not yet widely spoken, although Portuguese speakers are rapidly growing in number. Portuguese is used mostly in official or administrative settings. It is Ibinda, a Bantu language, that is the primary language of both the city and province of Cabinda.

== Economy ==
In the primary sector, a large number of the inhabitants of the city and municipality are engaged in fishing activities (maritime and riverine), shellfish gathering, and subsistence peasant farming. Plant extraction is concentrated on timber extraction.

Industry in the city of Cabinda is concentrated in civil construction and the manufacture of beverages and cooking oils. It also has a strong commercial and service base, mainly supported by a large supply of public-sector activities, in addition to a major supply of financial services, which make it the province's principal political, financial and economic center. Cabinda's retail and wholesale trade supplies a variety of products to the entire province. Hospitality and tourism are other activities that generate an important wage mass for the city's economy.

Transport logistics, in turn, became the city's main economic driver after the 2024 administrative-territorial reform, relying on its passenger and food-cargo port, the province's only international airport, and its good road network. The port, in particular, also adds the ship accommodation industry to the city's economy.

== Education and science ==
Cabinda hosts several important higher education institutions, notably a campus of the Universidade Lusíada de Angola and the headquarters of the Instituto Superior Politécnico de Cabinda.

Before the 2024 administrative-territorial reform, the main campus of 11 de Novembro University and the public higher education institute Instituto Superior de Ciências da Educação de Cabinda were located in the city of Cabinda.

In addition, it has campuses of the Private University of Angola.

== Culture ==
The city's population has a distinctive culture from its way of dressing and eating to traditional rituals, especially Chicumbe and celebrated ceremonies of Bakamas do Tchizo, a traditional ritual that enables the interaction between the living and the occult spirits of the gods and the ancestors, thus ensuring the reconciliation between the dead and the living.

The Cabinda Museum is one of the main centers for research and collection of Cabindan oral tradition. The museum displays handicrafts, traditions, customs and cultural practices of the province. The city also hosts the Chiluango Cultural Center, an institution that develops various activities in the fields of music, dance, performing arts and visual arts.

One of the main cultural-religious events is the Corpus Christi procession, held every year in June by Catholics. Another important Catholic celebration is the Feast of Saint Joseph of Cabinda, held annually in March. Both festivities are promoted by the Roman Catholic Diocese of Cabinda.

Among the culinary preparations culturally associated with Cabinda are quizaca with beans accompanied by chicuanga de pau, moqueca de peixe, and cocada.

=== Leisure ===
The main places of interest for tourism and leisure in the municipality include: Largo do Terminal Portuário (site of the Chinfuca slave concentration point), the coastal beaches of the Lúcio Tchiweka neighborhood, the Cabinda Museum, the Simulambuco Monument, Praça Grande/Largo do Ambiente, the Cabinda Municipal Library, the Catholic Church of Our Lady Queen of the World, the Catholic Church of the Immaculate Conception, the Cemetery of the Nobles, the Franques Cemetery, the Antendequele Evangelical Church, the Chiluango Cultural Center Square, Pedro Benge Square, Deolinda Rodrigues Square, the Catholic Mission Square, Irmão Evaristo Children's Park, 1 de Maio Square, the ruins of the Fort of Santa Maria de Cabinda, the scenic area of the Luvassa River mouth, and the natural lakes of the Chimbuande scenic area.

=== Sports ===
The municipality of Cabinda has three teams that regularly participate in provincial competitions and in the Girabola (the Angolan First Division): Sporting Clube Petróleos de Cabinda, Sport Cabinda e Benfica, and Futebol Clube de Cabinda.

Cabinda hosted Group B of the 2010 Africa Cup of Nations (CAN 2010), whose participants were Ivory Coast, Ghana, and Burkina Faso. The Togo national football team was disqualified from the competition after failing to appear for the match against Ghana due to the attack carried out by FLEC separatist rebels on 8 January. The matches were played at the Estádio Nacional do Chiazi, located in Liambo, with a capacity of 20,000 spectators; its construction was completed in 2010.

After the 2024 administrative-territorial reform, Estádio do Tafe became the only large-scale sports facility of its kind remaining in the city. Next to Estádio do Tafe is the Tafe Multi-purpose Pavilion. In addition to these facilities, Cabinda has a Sports Center that includes the João Tomé motocross track, a swimming center and an Olympic swimming pool (the latter two currently abandoned and in an advanced state of deterioration).

== Infrastructure ==
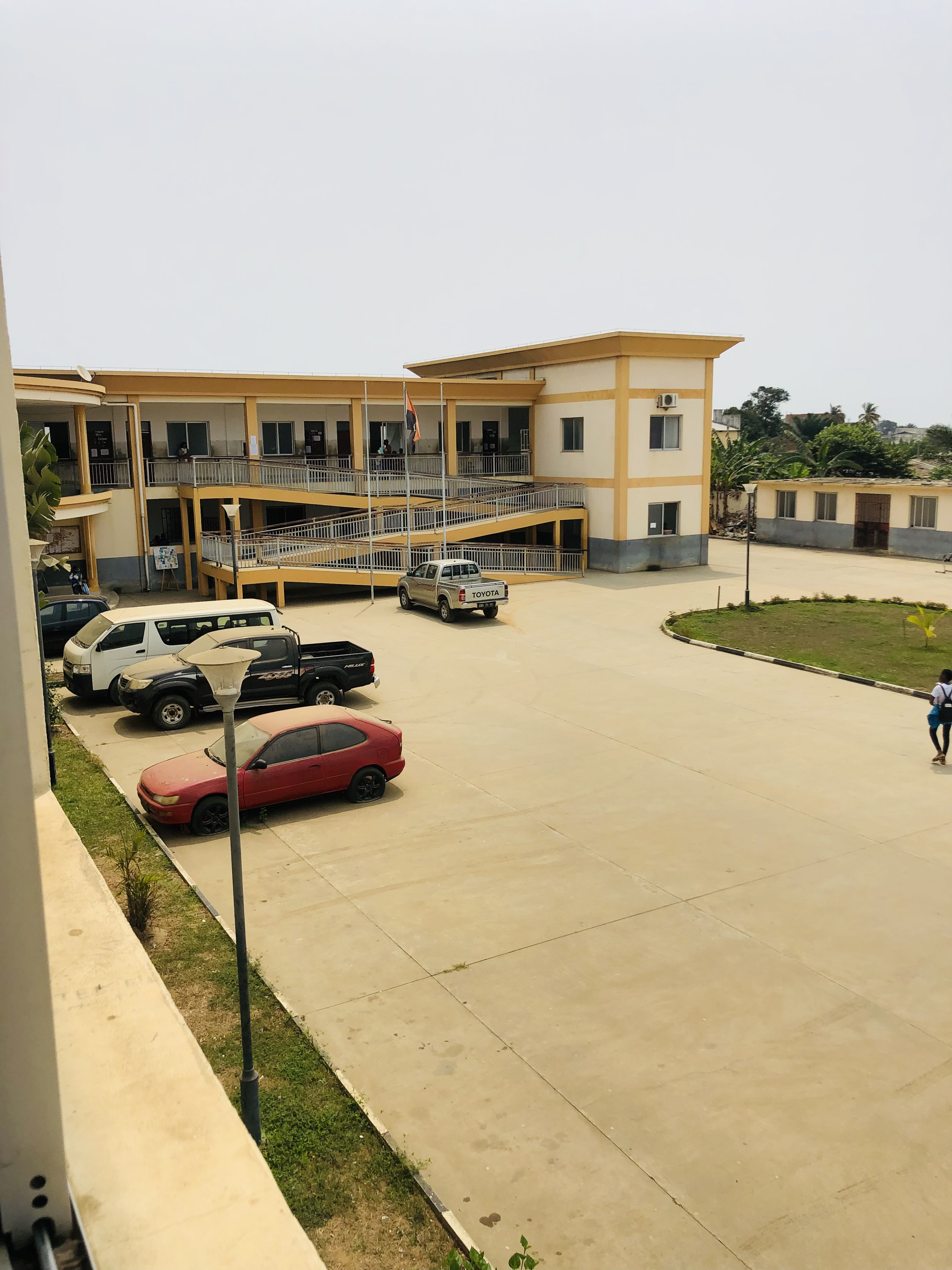
Public educational institution Escola Anexa IMNE-Cabinda, in 2024

=== Water supply ===
The supply of potable water in the city is ensured by the Provincial Water and Sanitation Company of Cabinda (EPASC), which sustains the system through groundwater and river intakes and, mainly, from Lakes Cuculo and Lombo and the Lulongo and Lucola rivers, with water pumped by electric pumps to reservoirs.

=== Communications ===
From the perspective of communications, available services include telephone services—fixed-line and mobile—offered by the operators Angola Telecom, Movicel and Unitel; radio broadcasting with frequencies from Rádio Cabinda (a retransmitter of the Rádio Nacional de Angola), Rádio Ecclesia, Rádio Comercial de Cabinda and Rádio Mais; terrestrial television broadcasting with repeaters from Televisão Pública de Angola and TV Zimbo; postal and telegraph services provided by Correios de Angola, and internet service available from the operators ZAP and Multitel. In print media, the traditional Jornal de Angola and the regional newspaper Nkanda are also available.

=== Electricity ===
Electric power supply in the city is ensured by the high- and medium-voltage transmission lines of the Rede Nacional de Transporte de Electricidade (RNT-EP), which provides energy from the Fútila Thermal Power Plant and from the Cabinda-Malembo Thermal Power Plant. Increased supply is expected through the Inga–Cabinda–Ponta Negra transmission lines, which will transmit power from the Inga hydroelectric complex located in the Democratic Republic of the Congo. Electricity is distributed at residential and commercial level by the Empresa Nacional de Distribuição de Electricidade (ENDE).

=== Health ===
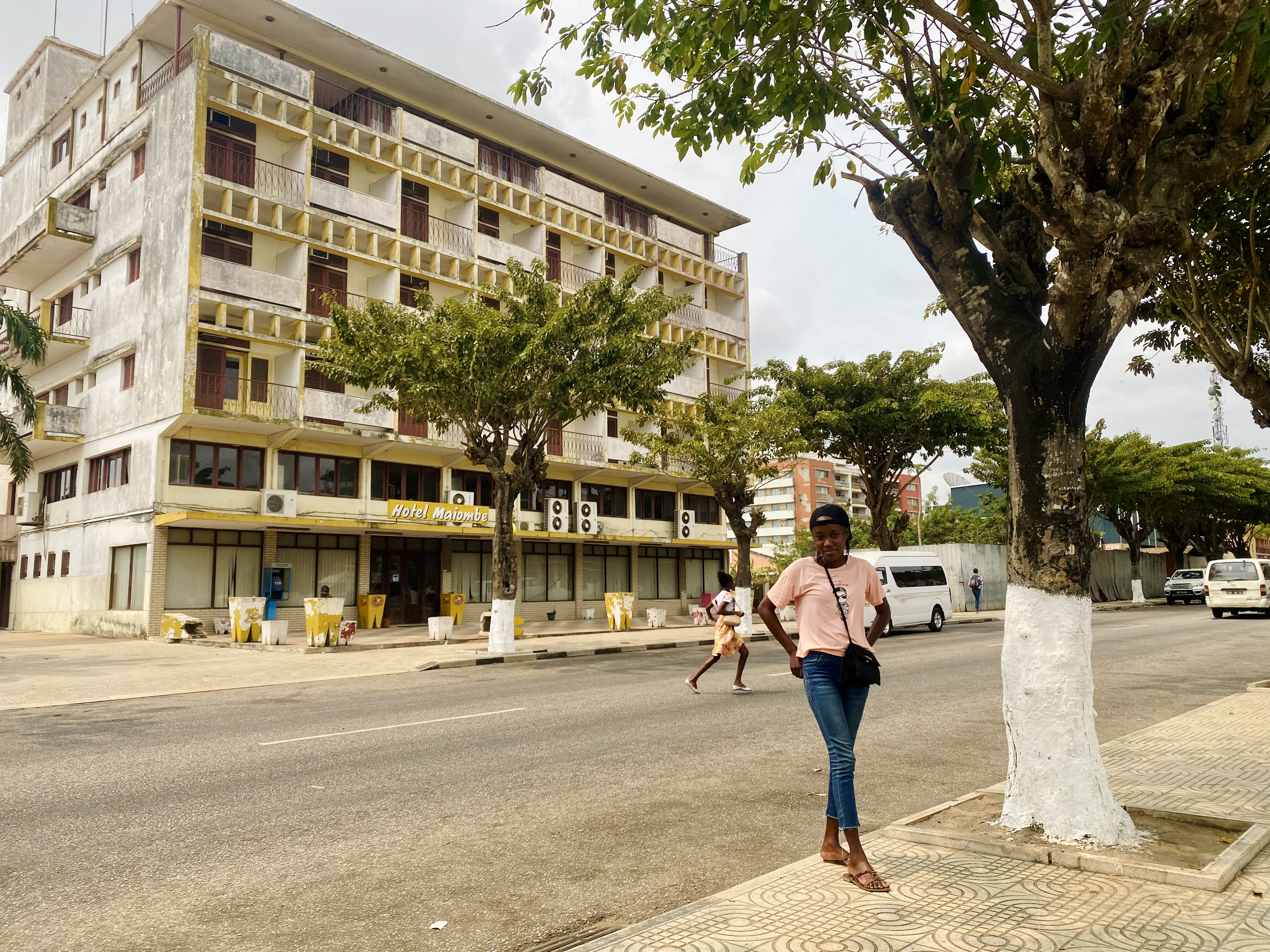
Hotel Maiombe on Dr. Agostinho Neto Street, in 2024

In the health sector, the city has several reference centers, including the Cabinda Central General Hospital, the 28 de Agosto Provincial Hospital, the Cabinda Military Hospital, the Cabinda-Chinga Municipal Hospital, the Lúcio Tchiweka Health Unit and the 1º de Maio Maternity Dispensary, in addition to numerous clinics and health centers.

=== Security ===
Public security in Cabinda is ensured by a battalion of the Military Police of the Angolan Armed Forces, a permanent detachment of the National Police of Angola, a police office of the Serviço de Investigação Criminal (Criminal Investigation Service) and a barracks of the Serviço de Protecção Civil e Bombeiros (Civil Protection and Fire Service). These services are coordinated through the Integrated Public Security Center (CISP).

Although it does not play the role of a conventional public security force, the city hosts the headquarters of the Cabinda Military Region, maintaining the 1st Infantry Division and the 1st Motorized Infantry Brigade of the Angolan Army. In addition, the Angolan Navy maintains a significant military presence in the city centered on the Cabinda Coastal Base, where the Cabinda Naval Command and the Cabinda Patrol Boat Squadron are stationed.

== Transport ==
The main transport routes linking the city and municipality of Cabinda are the EN-100 highway, which connects it to the city of Angoio to the south and to the town of Massabi to the north. There is also the EN-201, which links the city of Cabinda to the town of Tando Zinze and the town of Zenze do Lucula to the northeast, and the EN-202, which connects it to Malembo and the town of Zenze do Lucula to the northeast.

Because Cabinda is an exclave, its fastest connection with the rest of the national territory is by air, with the principal facility being Maria Mambo Café Airport.

However, the most important and fundamental transport facilities in the municipality are located in the Cabinda Port Complex, which includes the Port of Cabinda and the Fishing Port, specialized in the embarkation and disembarkation of food and passengers.

In 2012, a proposed railway connection to the main Angolan system has to cross territory of the Democratic Republic of the Congo.

== Notable people ==
- Eduardo Camavinga (born 2002), French football player
- Edilson Paca Jr. (born 1999), investor and entrepreneur

== See also ==
- Togolese national football team bus attack

== Bibliography ==
- Esteves Pereira; Guilherme Rodrigues, eds. (1906). "Cabinda". Portugal: Diccionario Historico... (in Portuguese). Vol. 2. Lisbon: Joao Romano Torres. hdl:2027/gri.ark:/13960/t6m081q3b. OCLC 865826167.
