= Albina Africano =

Angolan chemist and politician

Advisor to the President of the Republic
- Incumbent
- Assumed office 2018

CEO of Sonangol
- In office 1991–1993
- Succeeded by: Sebastião de Sousa e Santos

Minister of Petroleum
- In office 1992–2002
- Preceded by: João Landoite
- Succeeded by: Desidério Costa

Minister of Industry
- Preceded by: Manuel Duque
- Succeeded by: Joaquim David

Personal details
- Born: June 3, 1945 (age 81) Luanda, Angola
- Party: MPLA

Albina Faria de Assis Pereira Africano best known as Albina Assis (born June 3, 1945, in Luanda, Portuguese Angola) is an Angolan chemist and politician. She has held many positions including Minister of Oil and Industry in the Angolan government, Special Advisor to the President for Regional Affairs, and Chairman of the Board of Directors of Sonangol.

== Early life ==
Albina Assis Africano was born on 3 June 1945 in Luanda, at that time the capital of the Portuguese colony of Angola. Africano graduated from the Instituto Industrial in Luanda in 1967.

In 1972, three years before Angola became independent in 1975, Africano began to study in Luanda. She received her undergraduate B.A. in Chemistry at Agostinho Neto University in 1982. She specialized in the sciences of oil production, including study or internships in Antwerp (1984), the Lindsey Institute of Oil Sciences in France (1987), and the College of Petroleum and Energy Studies at Oxford (1989) in the United Kingdom.

== Career ==
In addition to her studies, Africano worked as a teacher (1968-1975). After independence in 1975, she became Angola's director of Chemical Analysis at the National Laboratory of Chemical Analysis, where she remained until 1983.

Africano then joined Fina Petroleum, Angola Refinery (Fina-Angola), where she worked for two years as a chemist before being promoted to Deputy Director of the Fina Refinery Department at Angola (1985-1991). From 1991 to December 1992 August she was chairman of the board of the state oil company, Sonangol. In 1992 Angola held its first multiparty elections, and Africano joined the government, where she headed the oil business until 1999.

She is a long-time member of MPLA (Popular Movement for the Liberation of Angola). She served in the government as Minister of Petroleum and Minister of Industry, before becoming a Special Advisor to the President for Regional Affairs.

External videos
- Albina Africano, "The Angola Pavilion: A Journal of Food and Culture", August 25, 2015, USC Annenberg

She served as the Commissioner General of the Angola Pavilion at the 2015 World Expo in Milan, and was elected the Chair Person of the Steering Committee of the College of Commissioner Generals of Expo Milan 2015. She is also President of the Food Bank of Angola.

It is our duty to give our people more resources to support national policies aimed at maximising the potential of cultural traditions and local food.

— Albina Assis Africano, 2015

== Awards ==
In 2015 Albina Africano received the Prémio Feminina - a prize for Portuguese-speaking women of outstanding achievement. The award is awarded by Matriz Portuguesa.

== Honours ==
- Order of the Rising Sun, 2nd Class, Gold and Silver Star (2026)
