= Expedition (1795 ship) =

British slave ship

History

Great Britain
- Launched: 1763, Thames
- Renamed: Expedition (circa 1795)
- Fate: Condemned 1808

General characteristics
- Tons burthen: 213, or 220 (bm)
- Complement: 1798:25; 1800:30; 1801:25; 1804:30
- Armament: 1798:14 × 9-pounder guns; 1800:18 × 9-pounder guns; 1801:18 × 9-pounder guns; 1804:16 × 9-pounder guns

Expedition was launched in 1763, almost certainly under another name. She entered the registers as Expedition in 1795. Between 1799 and 1807, she made seven voyages as a Liverpool-based slave ship in the triangular trade in enslaved people. She was condemned as unseaworthy at Antigua in early 1808, after having earlier disembarked at Jamaica the captives from her seventh voyage.

== Career ==
Expedition first appeared in Lloyd's Register (LR) in 1795. A later listing in the Register of Shipping included the note that the repairs in 1793 had included lengthening.

Lloyd's List reported in November 1795 that Expedition, Smith, master, had put into Ramsgate due to leaks. She was coming from Oporto.

Year	Master	Owner	Trade	Source & notes
1795	W.Smith	Atkinson	Falmouth–Oporto	LR; through repair 1793 & damages repaired 1796
1796	W.Smith	Atkinson	Falmouth–Oporto	LR; through repair 1793 & damages repaired 1796
1797	W.Smith	Atkinson	Hull–Cadiz; London–Barbados	LR; through repair 1793 & damages repaired 1796

=== Transporting enslaved people ===
Year	Master	Owner	Trade	Source & notes
1798	W.Smith; J.Murdock	Atkinson	London–Barbados	LR; through repair 1793 & damages repaired 1796
1799	Maddock	Clark & Co.	Liverpool–Africa	LR; through repair 1793 & damages repaired 1796

1st voyage transporting enslaved people (1799): Captain John Murdock acquired a letter of marque on 12 December 1798; he sailed from Liverpool on 12 January 1799. In 1799, 156 vessels sailed from English ports, bound for the trade in enslaved people; 134 of these vessels sailed from Liverpool.

Expedition acquired captives at Calabar. Murdock died on 22 April 1799. Captain Robert McAdam replaced Murdock.

Expedition stopped at São Tomé and then St Vincents. Expedition, late Murdock, was at St Vincents and then sailed for Jamaica. She arrived at Kingston, Jamaica on 3 August, with 347 captives. She sailed from Kingston on 4 September and arrived back at Liverpool on 4 November. She had left Liverpool with 43 crew members and she had suffered 19 crew deaths on her voyage.

2nd voyage transporting enslaved people (1800–1801): Captain George Cormack acquired a letter of marque on 27 February 1800. He sailed from Liverpool on 13 March. In 1800, 133 vessels sailed from English ports, bound for the trade in enslaved people; 120 of these vessels sailed from Liverpool.

Expedition acquired captives at Malembo and arrived at Kingston, Jamaica on 7 October with 232 captives. She had left Liverpool with 34 crew members and she arrived at Jamaica with 30. She sailed from Kingston on 27 November and arrived back at Liverpool on 18 January 1801. She had suffered nine crew deaths on her voyage.

3rd voyage transporting enslaved people (1801–1802): Captain John Ward acquired a letter of marque on 10 March 1801. He sailed from Liverpool on 14 April. In 1801, 147 vessels sailed from English ports, bound for the trade in enslaved people; 122 of these vessels sailed from Liverpool.

Expedition acquired captives at Calabar. She arrived with them at Demerara on 3 December 1801. She sailed for Liverpool on 9 February 1802 and arrived there on 8 April. She had left Liverpool with 34 crew members and had suffered nine crew deaths on her voyage.

In Demerara Expedition had loaded a cargo of sugar coffee, and rum. Samuel Robinson sailed on her return voyage and described Ward as a cruel captain.

4th voyage transporting enslaved people (1802–1803): Captain John D'Arcy sailed from Liverpool on 10 July 1802. In 1802, 155 vessels sailed from English ports, bound for the trade in enslaved people; 122 of these vessels sailed from Liverpool.

Expedition acquired captives at the Cameroons. She stopped at Barbados and then arrived at Dominica on 1 February 1803, with 256 captives. She sailed for Liverpool on 10 March and arrived back there on 18 April. She had left Liverpool with 23 men and had suffered six crew deaths on her voyage.

In November Lloyd's List reported that Expedition, of Liverpool, had detained St Augustine, from Malaga to Vera Cruz. Also, Lady Francis, of Liverpool, had detained St Anna, Ligitadana, master, from Havana to Cadiz. Both St Augustine and St Anna were sent into Liverpool.

5th voyage transporting enslaved people (1804–1805): Captain Robert Roberts acquired a letter of marque on 17 March 1804, on 25 April sailed for West Africa. In 1804, 147 vessels sailed from English ports, bound for the trade in enslaved people; 126 of these vessels sailed from Liverpool.

Expedition acquired captives at Cape Grand Mount and arrived at Suriname on 17 October, with 254 captives. She sailed from Suriname on 17 October and arrived back at Liverpool on 25 January 1805. She had left Liverpool with 33 crew members and had suffered six crew deaths on her voyage. Expedition arrived at Liverpool with a cargo consisting of sugar, bales of cotton, coffee, 180 "elephant teeth", and barwood.

6th voyage transporting enslaved people (1805–1806): Captain Roberts sailed from Liverpool on 11 August 1805, bound for West Africa. On 27 November, Roberts wrote a letter to Expedition's owners from Bassa Roads, reporting that the factory at Crab Island (13.455°N 16.582°W) had suffered an explosion that had injured two captains and a doctor. Expedition arrived at Suriname on 28 February 1806, with 235 captives. She sailed from Suriname on 30 April, and arrived back at Liverpool on 9 June. She had left Liverpool with 37 crew members and had suffered 13 crew deaths on her voyage. Expedition arrived at Liverpool with a cargo consisting of the same commodities as on his prior voyage, but with 274 elephant teeth.

7th voyage transporting enslaved people (1806–1807): Captain Roberts sailed from Liverpool on 8 September 1806, bound for the Windward Coast. Expedition acquired captives between Rio Nuñez and the Assini River. She arrived at Kingston, Jamaica on 23 June 1807, with 215 captives. She sailed from Kingston on 28 November, bound for Liverpool.

== Fate ==
In March 1808, Lloyd's List reported that Expedition, Roberts, master, had been sailing from Jamaica to Liverpool when she had to put into Antigua in distress. Expedition was condemned there. Her cargo was transshipped in Fairfield and King George.

Expedition does not appear in the most comprehensive list of losses of vessels engaged in transporting enslaved people, perhaps because the Lloyd's List news item did not identify her as a Guineaman, or perhaps because the loss may have occurred in early 1808. Still. during the period 1793 to 1807, war, rather than maritime hazards or resistance by the captives, was the greatest cause of vessel losses among British enslaving vessels.
