= List of schools in Angola =

This is a list of notable schools in Angola.

== Schools ==
- Escola Portuguesa de Luanda
- Luanda International School

== See also ==
- Education in Angola
- Lists of schools
