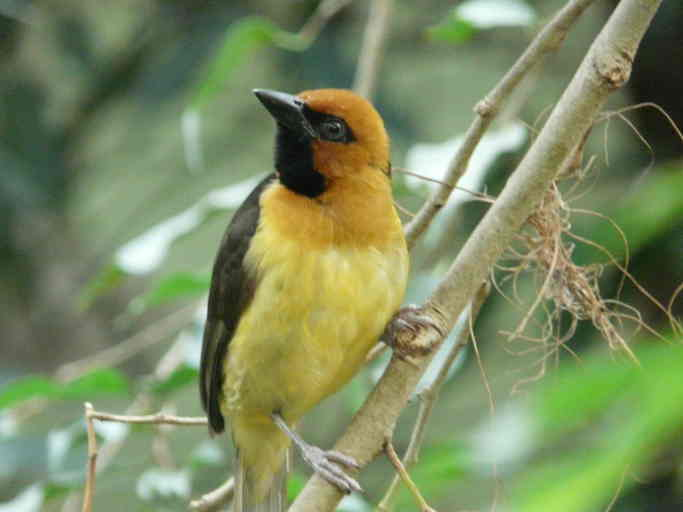

Conservation status
- Least Concern (IUCN 3.1)

Scientific classification
- Kingdom: Animalia
- Phylum: Chordata
- Class: Aves
- Order: Passeriformes
- Family: Ploceidae
- Genus: Ploceus
- Species: P. nigricollis

Binomial name
- Ploceus nigricollis (Vieillot, 1805)

= Black-necked weaver =

Species of bird

The black-necked weaver (Ploceus nigricollis) is a resident breeding bird species in much of central Africa from Cameroon in the west to Kenya and southern Somalia in the east.

== Taxonomy and systematics ==
The species was formally described in 1805 by the French ornithologist Louis Pierre Vieillot, who named it Malimbus nigricollis. The description was based on a specimen that had been collected near Malimbe, now Malembo, in the Cabinda Province of Angola. The species epithet nigricollis combines the Latin words Latin words, niger meaning "black" and collis meaning "necked".

=== Subspecies ===
There are two subspecies recognized:

- P. n. nigricollis – (Vieillot, 1805): Found from eastern Cameroon to southern Sudan, western Kenya, north-western Tanzania, southern Democratic Republic of Congo and Angola. Also on the island of on Bioko
- P. n. melanoxanthus – (Cabanis, 1878): Found from southern Ethiopia and southern Somalia to central and eastern Kenya and north-eastern Tanzania

The black-necked weaver was formerly considered to be conspecific with the olive-naped weaver. The two species differ in plumage and in the colour of the iris. A molecular study published in 2019 found that the two species are genetically very similar.

== Description ==
The black-necked weaver is a stocky 16 cm bird with a strong conical bill. The adult male has black upper-parts and wings and tail, and yellow underparts and mostly yellow head. It has a black eye-mask, nape, and bib, and a reddish iris.

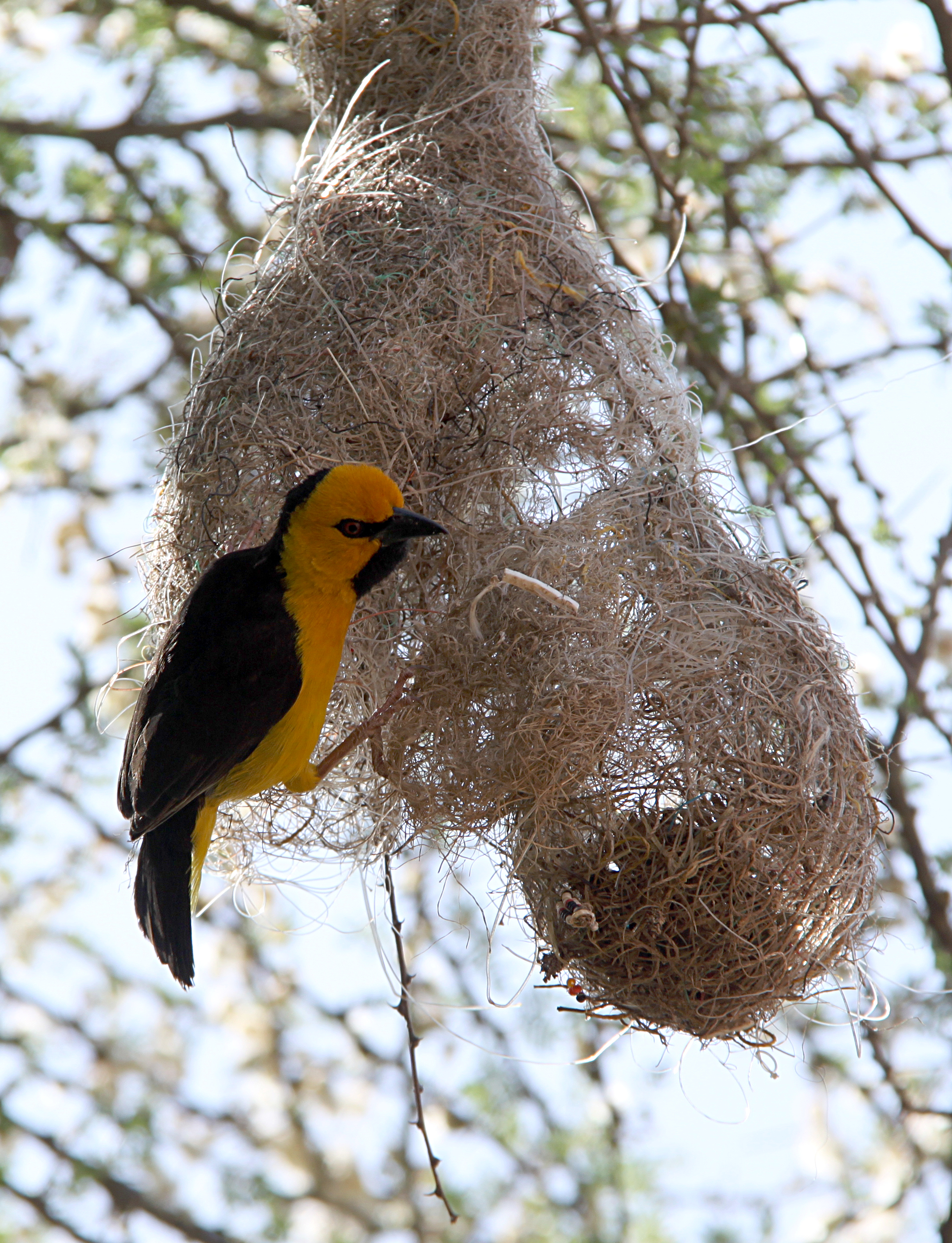
P. n. melanoxanthus

The adult female also has black upper-parts and wings, and yellow underparts. It has a black eye-line, a yellow throat with no black bib, and a black crown instead of the male's yellow.

The black-necked weaver feeds on insects and vegetable matter. The calls of this bird include a wheezing dew-dew-twee .

== Distribution and habitat ==
This weaver occurs in forests, especially in wet habitats.

== Behaviour and ecology ==
It builds a large coarsely woven nest made of grass and creepers with a 15 cm downward facing entrance tunnel hanging from the globular egg chamber. The nest is suspended from a branch in a tree and 2-3 eggs are laid. It nests in pairs but forms small flocks when not breeding.
