= Maria de Jesus Trovoada =

São Toméan biologist and politician (born 1961)

Maria de Jesus Trovoada dos Santos (born 1961) is a São Tomé and Príncipe biologist and politician who is known for her research on human genetics. She was appointed Minister of Health to the XVI Constitutional Government of São Tomé and Príncipe in 2014.

== Career ==
Maria de Jesus Trovoada dos Santos was born on 25 December 1961 in the parish of Conceição, São Tomé and Príncipe. After she graduated from secondary school, she worked as a teacher and volunteered with education programmes that aimed to improve the health of agricultural workers.

In 1984, she left for Angola where she began to study Biology at the University of Luanda, which she went on to complete at the University of Coimbra, Portugal. She stayed in Portugal until 2010, when she returned to São Tomé and Príncipe. During her time in Portugal she worked as a researcher at the Instituto Gulbenkian de Ciência, where she focused on studying the genetic susceptibility of São Toméans to malaria.

Returning to São Tomé and Príncipe, she headed the National Program to Fight Malaria at the country's National Center for Endemic Diseases. In her scientific work she has focused on studying the genetic characteristics of human populations, residing in the São Tomé archipelago and in central Portugal. Research projects have included: the study of population samples looking for genetic polymorphisms in newborns and the development of electrophoretic separation techniques, amongst others.

In 2014, she joined the XVI Constitutional Government of São Tomé and Príncipe, assuming the position of Minister of Health.

== Awards and recognition ==
Matriz Portuguesa (Association for the Development of Culture and Knowledge) awarded her the Femina Prize in 2018.

A biography of her was published in the book Vidas a Descobrir: Mulheres Cientistas do Mundo Lusophone (Associação Viver a Ciência, 2009).
