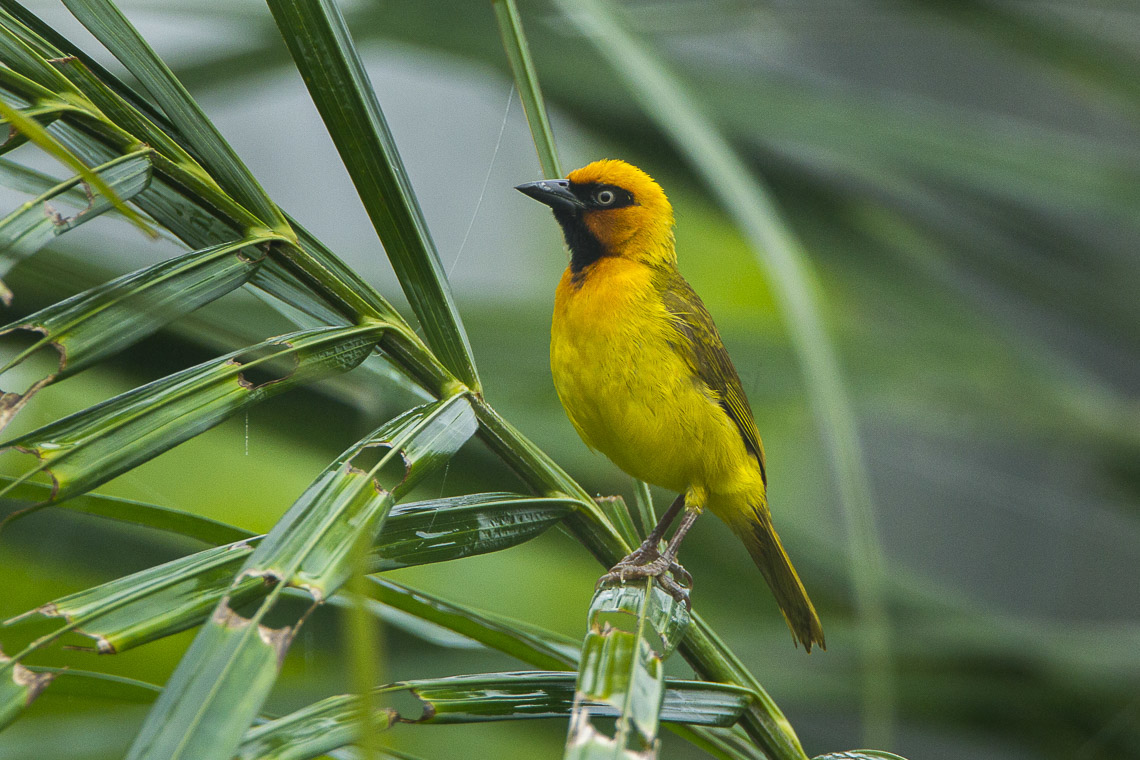
- Male in Ghana

Conservation status
- Least Concern (IUCN 3.1)

Scientific classification
- Kingdom: Animalia
- Phylum: Chordata
- Class: Aves
- Order: Passeriformes
- Family: Ploceidae
- Genus: Ploceus
- Species: P. brachypterus

Binomial name
- Ploceus brachypterus Swainson, 1837

= Olive-naped weaver =

Species of bird

The olive-naped weaver (Ploceus brachypterus) is a bird species in the family Ploceidae. It is found in West Africa from Senegal and Gambia to Cameroon.

== Taxonomy ==
The olive-naped weaver was formally described and illustrated in 1837 by the English naturalist William Swainson. He did not specify the origin of his specimens but they probably came from Senegal. He placed the species in the genus Ploceus and coined the binomial name Ploceus brachypterus. The specific epithet is from Ancient Greek brakhupteros meaning "short-winged".

The olive-naped weaver was formerly considered to be a subspecies of the black-necked weaver (Ploceus nigricollis). The two species differ in plumage and in the colour of the iris, but a molecular study published in 2019 found that they are genetically very similar.
