= Paulino Baptista =

Angolan politician and diplomat

Paulino Domingos Baptista

Ambassador of Angola to the Holy See
- Incumbent
- Assumed office 2017

Minister of Hotel and Tourism
- In office 2016–2017

Paulino Domingos Baptista (born 8 July 1951 in Luanda) is an Angolan politician who served as minister of Hotel and Tourism and currently serves as ambassador of Angola to the Holy See.

== Early life and education ==
Paulino Domingos Baptista, born and raised in Angolan capital, Luanda, studied Economics at the Agostinho Neto University graduating in 1988. He is married with four children. He speaks three foreign languages of Portuguese, Spanish and English.

== Career ==
He began working in 1976 as delegate of the Ministry of the Interior in the provinces of Cunene, Huila and Luanda until 1990, when he became national director of tourism. From 1991 to 2016, he served in various positions in the ministry of Hotel and Tourism as deputy minister, Secretary of State and an interim minister of tourism. He was appointed substantive minister of tourism in 2016 and served until 2017 when he was appointed Angolan ambassador to the Holy See. He presented his letter of credence to the Holy See on 7 September 2018.
