= Desidério Costa =

Angolan politician

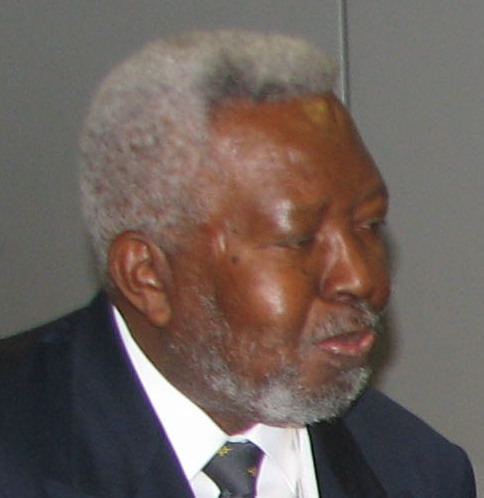
- Costa in 2008

Minister of Petroleum
- In office 2002–2008
- Preceded by: Botelho de Vasconcelos
- Succeeded by: Botelho de Vasconcelos

Vice Minister of Petroleum
- In office 1984–2002

Personal details
- Born: Desidério da Graça Veríssimo e Costa; April 4, 1934 (age 91) Luanda, Angola
- Children: 5
- Education: Montanuniversität Leoben

Desidério da Graça Veríssimo e Costa (born April 4, 1934) is an Angolan politician who was Minister of Petroleum from 2002 to 2008.

As Minister of Petroleum, Costa visited the China, Cuba, Venezuela, the United States and others, due to his country's expanding petroleum industry. He was the 2005-2006 chairman of the African Petroleum Producers Association (APPA). He oversaw the emerging importance of Angolan oil in the global market. Costa also oversaw Angola's joining of OPEC by January 2007, as it is now the 2nd leading petroleum exporter in Sub-Saharan Africa, with over 1.3 billion barrels drilled daily in 2005.

== Personal ==
Costa was born in Luanda. His father, Fernando Pascoal da Costa, a clerk in a railway station, was classified by the Portuguese Empire as "assimilado" (assimilated), i.e. with more rights as a regular black African, but still a lower status than a "real", i.e. "White" Portuguese. The Salazar regime in Portugal regarded the colonies as oversea provinces, but denied even those limited rights available under the Salazar dictatorship to the majority of the population of the colonies.

Costa's father was one of the early members of the Popular Movement for the Liberation of Angola (MPLA). He was one of the defendants in the "Process of the fifty", i.e. three criminal proceedings in 1960 for "high treason", i.e. favoring the independence of Angola from colonial rule. He was then imprisoned for many years on the Cabo Verde islands, also under Portuguese colonial rule at the time.

Desidério Costa, who went to school in Portugal during the process of his father, sought refuge in West Germany from prosecution by the PIDE, secret police of the Salazar regime. In Germany, he found his first refuge in a physician's family in Lüdenscheid, where he also worked in a factory and started to learn German. He prepared to study medicine, then served for several years as president of the association of students from the Portuguese colonies with seat in Morocco, before he decided to turn to the study of petroleum engineering, so that at least one Angolan patriot knowledgeable in petroleum engineering would be available after achieving independence.

Desidério Costa is married and has five children.

== Professional career ==
Costa graduated in 1975, shortly before Angola's independence, in petroleum engineering at the Montanuniversität Leoben, a technical university in the Austrian city of Leoben concentrating on mining, metallurgy and materials. In 1980–81, he pursued further studies in Petroleum Management in Cambridge, Massachusetts, USA.

Costa served as member of the Angolan National Commission for Restructuring the Petroleum Industry from 1976 to 1977, as General Deputy Director of Sonangol from 1977 to 1979, was National Director of Petroleum in the years from 1982 to 1984 and Vice Minister of Petroleum from 1984 to 2002. He was promoted to the position of Minister of Petroleum in a series of ministry-shake-ups in December 2002. He replaced Botelho de Vasconcelos, who was moved to the Ministry of Energy and Water. In the new cabinet formed on October 3, 2008, after the parliamentary elections of September 2008, he was replaced again by his predecessor. Desidério Costa continues to work as consultant to the oil industry.

The 145th meeting of the OPEC Conference on 11 September 2007 elected Costa as the head of the Angolan delegation to serve as Alternate President for the year 2008. With the government changes in October 2008, this office also went over to the new Angolan minister for petroleum.
