= José Maria Botelho de Vasconcelos =

Angolan politician

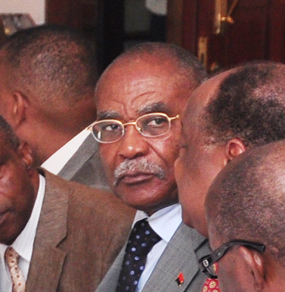
- José Maria Botelho de Vasconcelos

Minister of Petroleum
- In office 2008–?
- President: José Eduardo dos Santos
- Prime Minister: Paulo Kassoma

Minister of Energy and Water
- In office 2002–2008
- President: José Eduardo dos Santos
- Prime Minister: Fernando da Piedade Dias dos Santos

Minister of Petroleum
- In office 1999–2002
- President: José Eduardo dos Santos

Personal details
- Born: March 24, 1950 (age 76) Malange, Angola
- Education: Industrial Institute of Luanda

José Maria Botelho de Vasconcelos is an Angolan politician. He was the Minister of Petroleum.

== Early life and education ==
José Maria Botelho de Vasconcelos (born 24 March 1950 in Malanje, Angola) is an Angolan politician and petroleum industry executive. He studied at the Industrial Institute of Luanda, where he trained as a technical electromechanical engineer. Prior to entering government service, he worked in Angola's petroleum sector, including positions with the Cabinda Gulf Oil Company, Sonangol, and several international petroleum-related organizations.

== Career ==
Botelho de Vasconcelos began his professional career in the Angolan oil industry during the 1970s. He worked as a maintenance engineer at the Cabinda Gulf Oil Company and later held positions related to petroleum marketing and technical inspection. He also received specialized training in petroleum management and strategic planning in Europe and the United Kingdom.

In 1999, President José Eduardo dos Santos appointed Botelho de Vasconcelos as Minister of Petroleum. He served in that position until 2002, when he was succeeded by Desidério Costa and appointed Minister of Energy and Water. As Minister of Energy and Water, he oversaw national policies related to electricity generation, water supply, and infrastructure development during Angola's post-civil war reconstruction period. Following the 2008 parliamentary election, Botelho de Vasconcelos returned to the position of Minister of Petroleum.

During his second tenure, Angola continued expanding offshore oil production and strengthened its role within the Organization of the Petroleum Exporting Countries (OPEC), which the country had joined in 2007. In 2009, Botelho de Vasconcelos served as President of the OPEC Conference. During his presidency, he chaired several OPEC ministerial meetings, including the 152nd, 153rd, 154th, and 155th meetings, which addressed global oil-market conditions during the aftermath of the 2008 financial crisis. He also presided over the first OPEC Conference hosted in Angola, held in Luanda in December 2009.

== OPEC Presidency ==
As President of the OPEC Conference in 2009, Botelho de Vasconcelos advocated market stability and cooperation among oil-producing countries during a period of declining oil prices and economic uncertainty. Under his chairmanship, OPEC maintained production policies aimed at supporting market balance and the recovery of global energy demand.

== Controversies ==
Botelho de Vasconcelos was mentioned in reports related to the Panama Papers and Paradise Papers investigations concerning offshore companies connected to Angolan political and business figures. According to documents reviewed by the International Consortium of Investigative Journalists (ICIJ), he held power of attorney for an offshore company during his first term as Minister of Petroleum. He denied any wrongdoing.
