= Mandume ya Ndemufayo =

Last king of the Oukwanyama

- Final King of the Oukwanyama Kingdom
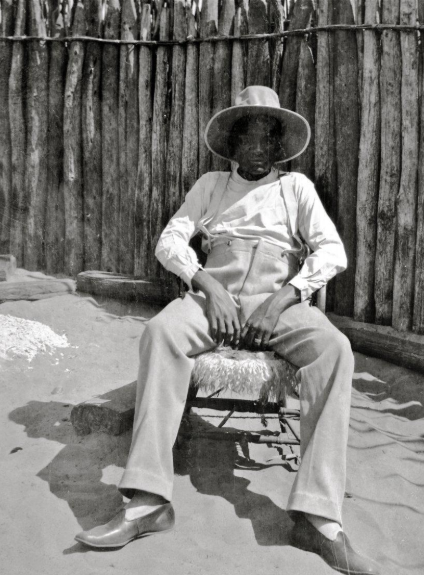
- Mandume ya Ndemufayo (~1915)
- Reign: 1911-1917
- Successor: None
- Born: 1894; Oukwanyama Kingdom
- Died: 6 February 1917 (aged 22–23); Namibia

Mandume ya Ndemufayo (1894 – 6 February 1917) was the last king of the Oukwanyama, a subset of the Ovambo people of southern Angola and northern Namibia. Ya Ndemufayo took over the kingdom in 1911 and his reign lasted until 1917 when he died of either suicide or machine gun fire while he was under attack from South African colonizers. Ya Ndemufayo is honoured as a national hero in both Angola and Namibia.

== Background ==
The Oukwanyama kingdom was split by the 1884 Berlin Conference into the areas of Portuguese West Africa and German South West Africa.

== Childhood ==
Ya Ndemufayo grew up during a time of significant upheaval in the Oukwanyama kingdom due to the presence of European merchants and missionaries. Third in line for succession to the Kwanyama throne, the prince lived in fear of assassination from an early age.

== 1911-1915 ==
Ya Ndemufayo took the throne peacefully by Kwanyama standards and immediately moved the royal residence to Ondjiva (now in Angola). Ya Ndemufayo expelled Portuguese traders from Kwanyama territory to denounce price inflation. Internally, he issued decrees prohibiting the picking of unripened fruit to protect against droughts and the unneeded use of firearms, an important commodity obtained from European traders. Significantly, he also issued harsh penalties for the crime of rape and allowed women to own cattle, which was previously illegal. Overall, King Mandume sought to restore previous Kwanyama wealth and prosperity against a decaying system of local leadership.

== Relationship with Christianity ==
Ya Ndemufayo had a reputation for expelling Christians within the Oukwanyama kingdom. Numerous Christian families fled to the Ondonga kingdom of the Ovambos. Ya Ndemufayo did not favor Portuguese Catholic missionaries as well as German Rhenish Missionary Society Protestants within his kingdom.

== Battle and death ==
No European colonizer challenged the well-organized and well-armed Ovambo kingdoms until 1915 and the beginning of World War I which coincided with a massive local drought. During the Battle of Omongwa, ya Ndemufayo and the Kwanyamas resisted a Portuguese attack for three days. Simultaneously, the South African forces conquered the portion of the Oukwanyama kingdom formerly located in German South West Africa. Due to heavy losses, ya Ndemufayo was forced to relocate the Kwanyama capital to the area of South West Africa. In February 1917, after ya Ndemufayo refused to submit to South African control, he died in battle against the South Africans. The cause of his death is disputed; South African records show his death from machine-gun fire, while oral and popular history described his death as suicide.

The Oukwanyama kingship was abolished following his death in 1917 until February 1998 when Cornelius Mwetupunga Shelungu was named chief.

== Recognition ==
- Mandume ya Ndemufayo is one of nine national heroes of Namibia that were identified at the inauguration of the country's Heroes' Acre near Windhoek. Founding president Sam Nujoma remarked in his inauguration speech on 26 August 2002 that:

"It is better to die fighting than to become a slave of the colonial forces." -- These were the defiant words of one of Namibia's foremost anti-colonialist fighters. He said these words in defiance when the combined [European] colonial forces insisted he should surrender. [...] To his revolutionary spirit and his visionary memory we humbly offer our honor and respect.

- Ya Ndemufayo is honoured in form of a granite tombstone with his name engraved and his portrait plastered onto the slab.
- King Mandume is also celebrated in Angola, having streets named after him in various cities of the country.
- A university in Angola established in 1963, Universidade Mandume ya Ndemufayo is named after King Mandume.
- In February 2017, a 100th anniversary of the death of Oukwanyama King Mandume ya Ndemufayo was attended by thousands of Namibians at Omhedi in the Ohangwena region including former Namibian presidents, also the current President Hage Geingob who unveiled a bust of King Mandume.
- Ya Ndemufayo has a street named after him stretching from the Windhoek city centre to Namibia's national university, the University of Namibia.

== Resources ==
- Vilho Kaulinge (Author), Patricia Hayes (Editor), Dan Haipinge (Editor, Translator), Michael Bollig (Series Editor): Healing the Land: Kaulinge's History of Kwanyama (History, cultural traditions and innovations in Southern Africa); 1997
- Napandulwe Shiweda: Mandume ya Ndemufayo's memorials in Namibia and Angola; 2005 (https://core.ac.uk/download/pdf/58912537.pdf)
