= History of education in Namibia =

The history of education in Namibia ranges from pre-colonial times until independence. It includes the history of education under both German and South African rule, before and after apartheid.

== Pre-colonial times ==
Education in pre-colonial Namibia was part of everyday life. Teaching and administering punishment or corrections was the responsibility of every adult. Riddles, poetry, memory tests, songs, dances and games were used to teach the roles and skills of adulthood.

Roles were given according to sex. Fathers would teach skills to their sons and mothers to their daughters. Some skills (such as blacksmithing and pot making) were controlled by certain clans and passed down by apprenticeship within the clan.

=== Missionary education ===
Missionary schooling was seen positively by local leaders, who saw it as a way to improve trade, technology and defence. Education gave missionaries an acceptable role within African society and allowed for the spread of missions. Missionaries could also pursue their mission of civilizing and westernizing Africans. Blacks who joined mission stations were expected to become employees and artisans, and training in practical and domestic skills was thus introduced.

== German rule ==
=== Black education ===
Blacks in German South West Africa began to see education as an important boon in their struggle to regain their lands. However, many white settlers saw any education of blacks as a threat to colonisation in Namibia. It was also not in their interest to employ educated laborers or to have to compete with skilled blacks.

Pressure from liberals and socialists led to the German government voting in funds for the education of blacks, but most of it wasn't actually spent. In 1912 there were only around 5 500 blacks in school.

=== White education ===
German settlers were provided with state schools. The goal was to assure the maintenance of German culture. However only 21% of school-aged white children were in school at the time South Africa took over.

== South African rule before Apartheid ==
=== Black education ===
At a 1923 meeting with all missions except the Finnish, the South African government imposed a normal course of schooling lasting two to four years. Reading, writing, arithmetic, religion and singing were to be taught in the vernacular.

In 1924 there were almost 4700 pupils in northern Namibia. During the same decade, the first boarding schools of Namibia opened.

Africans wished for assimilative education in a European language, as it was seen as a way to obtain better wages, equality and power. However, by the 1930s, the South African administration had become apprehensive of missionary education and wished to control it. It was believed that education would introduce Africans to world movements and thinking such as democracy and human rights. The administration notably disliked the 'bush school' movement. The Native Commissioner Major Hahn instituted that permission was needed for each new school that opened from 1932 onward. In 1936, he closed 84 out of 164 schools of the Finnish Mission, although most of the closures were not enforced due to weak government presence.

In 1935, the first state school opened after protests due to inadequate education. A 1936 report to the League of Nations criticized the poor standards and lack of facilities of northern Namibia's school, yet the government did not invest further in African education. Only two other schools would be built by the state until 1940, both in the central regions. No schools were built by the state in the north between 1940 and 1960. There were attempts by Namibians to build independent schools to bypass racist education, but those lacked funding.

Between 1935 and 1956 seven state schools were opened in Herero reserves, likely because of pressure from the League of Nations coupled with the fact that the German missions were too poor to take this responsibility. Education was otherwise still provided by missionaries.

In 1945 there were around 19 100 students in Namibia. There was still no secondary education and almost no education for the higher primary grades. Education was still mainly focused on practical and religious education, and did not teach agriculture – sparking criticisms from Africans.

=== Coloured education ===
South Africa instated a separate education system for coloured people. The goal was to have semi-skilled manual workers for the white-controlled economy. They were not prevented from studying beyond standard 2, unlike black students, and their syllabus was similar to whites'. However they barely had more resources than the blacks.

=== White education ===
Soon after taking power, South Africa made education compulsory for white children aged 7 to 17. It eventually started inserting the Cape Syllabus modeled after the British system. Whites could obtain primary and secondary education in Namibia but had to go to South Africa for vocational education, teacher training or university.

In the late 1920s, white students received over ten times more funds than African students, despite Europeans being outnumbered seven to one by blacks in Namibia, meaning whites education was 4,50 pounds per student and black education only 0,04 pounds per student.

German was discouraged as language of education to avoid German settlers seeking to collaborate with Germany for a return to German rule. Afrikaans and English were thus used in most state schools. As a result, most German children were sent to private German schools, which were subsidized by the government for a time. By the 1950s German was accepted in school as the government attempted to unite the settlers.

== South African rule during Apartheid ==
Education in apartheid Namibia could be seen as a continuation of South Africa's policy of "separate development". Schools were segregated by race on the territory of Namibia. (Note: With the exception of the Academy for Tertiary Education opened in 1980.) Different legislation existed to govern the education of different races. The homelands were responsible for education on their territory.

Education was still segregated by 1986 (Note: Two schools attempted to desegregate in 1976, but were stopped by the government.), even after petty apartheid laws were relaxed. Education was not compulsory or free for black Namibians, unlike for whites and coloureds.

=== Black education ===
From 1955 onward, something amounting to the Bantu Education Act was gradually put in place in the Namibian education system before being officially put in place in 1970. The South African government reasoned that South Africa would need literate blacks for its industrial economy, but that their education had to be limited so that they remain subordinate. According to the Eiselen Commission, Africans thus had to be given a four-year primary education teaching them basic knowledge of English (Note: English was taught in black schools, but poorly.) and Afrikaans and creating an interest in tribal heritage, agriculture, religion and hygiene. Unlike with the missionaries, they were not to be "civilized" and westernized. With the introduction of Bantu Education, the quality of education lowered.

Various figures for coloureds' and blacks' education
Year	Number of schools	Number of teachers	Number of pupils	Total population	Pupil- teacher ratio
1960	313	1310	43 624	452 540	33,3
1966	415	2071	78 295	514 100	37,8
1970	526	2713	112 006	671 601	41,3
1973	592	3453	138 890	735 000	40,2

The Education Ordinance of 1962 gave Dr Van Zyl the power to enact the plans of the 1958 Van Zyl Commission. These included the implementation of the Bantu education syllabus, the transfer of education from church schools to the state (Note: The churches lacked means and could not be trusted to teach the new syllabus in the right manner.), the production of staff for the lower echelons of government, the spread of the ideology of 'separate development' and the creation of a separate education department for Africans. The number of blacks with a four-year primary education was to be increased, but they were to be severely restricted in their access to further education. Africans had to accept their status in society and live a modest lifestyle.

Around the 1970s, the South African government took measures to replicate the South African education system in Namibia. They installed different syllabuses for different races, different wage scales, career structures and qualifications for teachers, separate policies for the admission to and continuation of schools, the creation of a public school network and the use of mother tongue instruction for all primary schools (Note: This was positive for fostering students' cultural identity, but negative for stopping communication and continuing the policy of separation of ethnic groups. This use of mother tongue instruction meant that attendees would generally not be familiar with Namibia's official, non-african languages.) until the fifth year (after which it was in Afrikaans).

To ensure the policy of the state would be enforced, the South African administration forbid unregistered schools for Africans through the Bantu Education Act and financial incentives. The state also stopped granting new sites to mission schools and removed subsidies from mission schools in an attempt to reduce mission education, as it had indeed had full responsibility of African education until the mid-1960s. Thus the number of missionary schools fell from 244 in 1960 to 36 in 1973, and in the late 1970s around 95% of the schools were in the government's control.

Transnational mining companies supported black education to maintain a positive image and to maintain their mining operations after Namibia's eventual independence, creating educational establishments and foundations for blacks and coloureds. They particularly supported higher education that could produce managers and skilled workers. In the mid-1970s, worker discontent at the lack of promotion opportunities and a lack of skilled white workers also led companies to focus on training black workers. This training in large parts created semi-skilled employees.

Education was seen as a way to escape poverty for black Namibians. The north of Namibia had become progressively less able to support its own population, and waged jobs that increasingly required an education were seen as a solution. Some blacks managed to reach skilled and management trainee positions in transnational companies, to become members of the Boards of Director of local companies or members of the administration of Namibia's bantustans. However most blacks could still not access such positions due to their lack of quality education.

A South African department of Bantu Education was initially responsible for black education in Namibia, only to be replaced by a department of National Education. The latter in reality did not have the power to impose policy on any ethnic education department. The umbrella organisations National Examination Board and the National Education Council were created in 1980, but four years later were still powerless and ineffective.

The transfer of education from the churches to the state allowed for a rapid increase in enrollments thanks to the state's greater resources. Most black children went to school in 1984, if only for a few months. However this caused classes to be overpopulated due to the lack of classrooms; the average in 1980 was 37 students per class, and lower grades could be double that size. Most students did not stay four to six years in school, notably because of hunger, because they instead worked or because their parents lacked resources. Basic literacy was thus not achieved. At best two-thirds of school leavers in 1981 were functionally literate. Relatively few students studied in a level over lower primary school, with Namibia performing significantly below comparable African countries in this metric. There were however efforts to expand training in and out of school in the early 1980s.

The syllabus was practically the same as the Bantu Education in South Africa by 1967. The focus of primary education was on manual skills, followed by natural science, biblical knowledge, history and geography. Mathematics is of secondary importance. Harsh discipline and rote learning were used in most Namibian schools.Schools lacked equipment for work or play, but books were provided free of charge for all races.

English schools for Africans were suppressed by the South African government, restricting communications with other African countries.

The intelligentsia played an important role in the country's nationalist struggles; notably, teachers, students and churchmen.

==== Secondary school ====
School enrolment in Namibia, 1975
Level	African	Coloured	White
Lower primary	74,1%	59,4%	36,7%
Higher primary	23,2%	33,2%	34,6%
Secondary	2,7%	7,4%	28,7%

Secondary education started being available to black Namibians in 1953. The first three black Namibians completed their secondary schools in 1959. (Note: Another source gives the year of 1948.) In northern Namibia, secondary school education began in 1961, offered by church schools and a few state schools. By 1975, there were twelve junior secondary schools and eight secondary schools for Africans, and by 1976, only 2,66% of the black population went to secondary schools. Dropout rates were extremely high, with most leaving after around 4 years of primary school. Only about 1% of Namibians had completed secondary school in 1985.

Partly due to pressure from international mining companies and commercial interests, the South African government started expanding secondary and vocational education in the early 1980s. Around 14 000 thousands blacks were enrolled in secondary school. However in 1982 only 261 blacks and 131 coloureds obtained a school leaving certificate compared to 832 whites. Of these, only 23 blacks and 7 coloureds accessed university. These numbers got better starting the next year with the opening of Concordia College. Of all secondary schools leavers, only 17% could be accepted for skilled worker training.

Students were taught in a chosen language for post-primary schools. Some schools started offering the syllabus of Swaziland, Lesotho and Botswana instead of the official syllabus by the early 1980s. These encouraged critical thinking instead of rote learning. However these schools had difficulties attaining the necessary standard for English and graduates faced discrimination from employers.

Namibia's secondary schools were sites of unrest. Starting in 1971 to at least the early 1980s, there were incidents of civil unrest every year. These often led to mass expulsions, sacking of teachers and the persecution if not torture of troublemakers. This unrest was notably caused by the government naming white head teachers to impose its ideology. This conflict fueled the liberation movements, with many students abandoning their education and joining it.

All races were provided with free government-run hostels at post-primary government institutions. Missions providing such services were given interest-free loans. Students paid half the cost of the stationery they needed.

White teachers started leaving black areas due to guerilla warfare in the early 1980s and South African army conscripts were named as teachers.

The white farming community used their political strength to limit the access of blacks to secondary and technical education, as that might raise wages.

===== Technical and agricultural education =====
Technical and agricultural education at secondary level for blacks was neglected. In 1976 there were only 261 Africans training for technical jobs, and this training would not make them full artisans. Although there were programs of trades training attached to other schools before, the first technical high school opened in 1979. It was paid by a transnational mining corporation. Namibia had two agricultural colleges by 1981, but they had very few students.

There were five vocational schools for Africans in Namibia in 1975. Overall, almost all vocational trainings were for men, except social work assistants, teachers or nurses. Around 1981, most training was for teachers or nurses.

==== Teachers ====
Educational standard of African Teachers in Namibia, 1975
Qualification	Coloured	Black
University degree	16	12
Matriculation	233	51
Junior Certificate or equivalent	359	304
Standard 6 8 years' school		1606
Technical or vocational	27	
None	121	1004
Total	756	2977

In 1967 black staff's salary could be over 6 times lower than their white counterparts' salaries. In the 1970s black teachers' salaries were only 46% of their white counterparts' salaries. Black teachers' housing conditions and salaries improved between 1978 and 1984, and teachers gradually became members of a new black middle class. By 1984, principals and matriculants earned as much as their white counterparts. These measures were put in place to obtain the cooperation (or at least silence) of black teachers; to avoid their support of the "socialist principles of the liberation movement". Despite this, teachers in the north were often suspected of being SWAPO supporters by the army.

Teachers in black schools were poorly trained in the 1970s and 1980s. In 1976 the majority (54%) had only completed their own primary education. Too few teachers were trained in general.

A teacher's association dominated by whites was created uniting different ethnic groups' teacher's associations. It discussed the conditions of employment.

Teachers often had poor morale due to contradictions between their roles as apartheid enforcers and teachers.

=== Coloured education ===
Coloured education was initially not compulsory, but it became so from 7 to 14 years old. It was provided for free. Coloured education was split in three departments; one for Rehoboters, another Coloureds and one for Namas.

In 1967, nearly all school-aged coloured children went to school despite education not being compulsory, but the dropout rates were high. Some government schools taught to coloured children, but most coloured children were taught by missions. Schools received a subsidy of 79 rands per annum for coloured children. At this time, coloured children followed a slightly modified syllabus.

Coloured students received more funding per capita than black students in the 1970s and 1980s. This was to create division between the two groups and create semi-skilled and skilled workers for jobs where white workers lacked.

There were attempts in the early 1980s to bring coloured students into the military with leadership courses.

=== White education ===
The education received by whites in Namibia was similar to the education received by whites in South Africa. Education was still compulsory from 7 to 17 years old. It was also was free. Thus, around 99% of white children were in school in 1974, and 68% went to secondary school in 1974.

Government schools for whites were under the control of and financed by the Namibian administration. By 1967, children attending primary school had to pay to receive a hostel.

White education received significantly more funding than black education, in large parts due to higher wages for teachers and more expensive school buildings. This was notably because the small white population chose from three different types of schools (German, Afrikaan and English) across all of Namibia. The ratio of students-to-teachers was of 13:1 in 1981. Fifteen million dollars was given for white education in 1976/1977 compared to only 4.5 million dollars for black and coloured education. In the 1975/1976 budget, around 9 times more rands were allocated to white students than black students. In 1981, the expenditure per student was over five times higher for white students relatively to black students. Even as white South Africans fled Namibia due to the possibility of independence in the early 1980s, funds were not cut significantly. Schools that were closed were not made available for black students.

Various figures for whites' education
Year	Number of schools	Number of teachers	Number of pupils	Total population	Pupil- teacher ratio
1960	63	666	16 257		24,4
1966	77	979	19 893		20,3
1970	80	1105	22 349		20,2
1973	85	1233	23 195		18,8

The Cape syllabus was still used in state schools, which was biased toward white South Africans' history and culture. White children were made to participate in militaristic activities such as cadet corps and holiday camps teaching them bush skills and drilling them with propaganda about the 'total onslaught'.

=== University ===
The central government had authority over post-secondary education. Namibia still did not have an university by the early 1980s, despite having the funds to build one. Students thus had to go to South African universities. Far more white students had gone to university than black students in 1978 (2268 against 318). Indeed blacks were restricted in their choice of university. There were no dedicated Namibian universities in South Africa's per-tribal group segregated schooling system, meaning a special application had to be made to be admitted. In 1977, it was estimated that only around 70 coloureds and blacks trained in tertiary education compared to 10 000 whites.

Whites, coloureds and blacks underwent the same Joint Matriculation Board courses and the same matriculation exam.

Instead, the multiracial Academy for Tertiary education, essentially a technical college, was opened in 1980. Most of the student population was black or coloured. Tuition was however not always of high quality and the number of dropouts was significant.

=== Foreign aid ===
==== United Nations ====
Some Namibians were the beneficiaries of the United Nations Educational Training Programme for Southern Africa. The United Kingdom gave 500 000 pounds to the programme.

==== United States ====
Kennedy created a scholarship program allowing Namibians to come study in the United States. Ten scholarships were awarded in 1962–1963.

==== United Kingdom ====
The United Kingdom started giving aid to Namibia in 1978. It was given not by the British government, but by the Rio Tinto–Zinc Corporation. It reached 700 000 pounds in 1985/1986. The programme included the costs of four teaching posts, fifty awards for Namibian students (mainly in English and public administration) and a Books Presentation Programme.
