= University November 11 =

Public university in Cabinda, Angola

Coordinates: 6.27433°S 14.25186°E

- Type: Public research university
- Established: 12 April 2009; 17 years ago
- Rector: João Fernando Manuel
- Location: Cabinda, Angola
- Campus: Urban
- Website: www.uon.ed.ao

The University November 11 (UON; Portuguese: Universidade 11 de Novembro) is an Angolan public university based in the city of Cabinda. In addition to Cabinda, it has campuses in Buco-Zau and Soyo.

Formerly one of the Agostinho Neto University campuses, it was separated in the process of reforms to Angolan higher education that took place in 2008 and 2009.

The university's base territory is the Cabinda Province and Zaire Province.

== Name origin ==
The university pays tribute in its name to Angola's independence day, which took place on "November 11th" 1975.

== Historic ==
The UON descends from the former campus of Agostinho Neto University (UAN) in Cabinda, opened in 1996. The campus housed one of the several Higher Institutes of Education Sciences (ISCED's) of UAN spread across Angola.

In 2008, ISCED in Cabinda is affected by the higher education reform promoted by the government of Angola. The reform proposed the decentralization of the UAN campuses, so that they could form new autonomous university centers. From this proposal emerged the 11 de Novembro University (UON), implemented by decree-law 7/09, of 12 May 2009, approved by the Council of Ministers.

By presidential decree 285, of 29 October 2020 — which reorganizes the Network of Public Higher Education Institutions of Angola (RIPES) — the Higher Polytechnic School of M'banza-Kongo was separated from the UON and made autonomous. It became the Zaire Higher School of Social Sciences, Arts and Humanities, operating on the M'banza Congo campus.
