= History of education in Angola =

The history of education in Angola refers to the formal education in Angola during the different periods of Portuguese presence and colonial occupation as well as during the postcolonial phases (1975-1991 and 1992 until today).

== Conditions before independence ==
African access to educational opportunities was highly limited for most of the colonial period. Until the 1950s, facilities run by the government were few and largely restricted to urban areas. Responsibility for educating Africans rested with Roman Catholic and Protestant missions. As a consequence, each of the missions established its own school system, although all were subject to ultimate control by the Portuguese with respect to certain policy matters.

Education beyond the primary level was available to very few Africans before 1960, and the proportion of the age group that went on to secondary school in the early 1970s was still quite low. Nevertheless, primary school attendance was growing substantially. Whether those entering primary schools were acquiring at least functional literacy in Portuguese was another matter. Primary school consisted of a total of four years made up of a pair of two year cycles. Portuguese statistics do not indicate how many students completed each of the cycles, but it is estimated that far fewer completed the full four years than entered the first cycle. Similarly, there seems to be general agreement among observers that a great number of those who entered secondary school did not complete it. In general, the quality of teaching at the primary level was low, with instruction carried on largely by Africans with very few qualifications. Most secondary school teachers were Portuguese, but the first years of secondary school were devoted to materials at the primary level.

== Conditions after Independence ==
The conflict between the Portuguese and the various nationalist movements and the civil war that ensued after independence left the education system in chaos. Most Portuguese instructors had left (including virtually all secondary school staff), many buildings had been damaged, and the availability of instructional materials was limited.

A report of the First Party Congress published in December 1977 gave education high priority. The report emphasized Marxism-Leninism as a base for the education system and its importance in shaping the "new generation," but the objectives of developing national consciousness and respect for traditional values were also mentioned. The training at all levels of persons who would be able to contribute to economic development was heavily stressed.

The government estimated the level of illiteracy following independence at between 85 percent and 90 percent and set the elimination of illiteracy as an immediate task. Initiated in November 1976, the literacy drive gave priority to rural peasants who had been completely ignored by the Portuguese education system. The priorities for education were, in order of importance, literacy, primary education, secondary education, and intermediate and university education. The government established the National Literacy Commission (under the leadership of the minister of education) to administer the literacy campaign.

The government reported that in the first year of the literacy campaign (November 1976 to November 1977) 102,000 adults learned to read and write; by 1980 the figure had risen to 1 million. By 1985 the average rate of adult literacy was officially estimated at 59 percent; United States government sources, however, estimated literacy at only 20 percent. In late 1987, Angola's official press agency, Angop, reported that the provinces with the most newly literate people included Huíla, Huambo, and Benguela and that 8,152 literacy teachers had participated in the campaign since its inception.

At independence there were 25,000 primary school teachers, but less than 2,000 were even minimally qualified to teach primary school children. The shortage of qualified instructors was even more pronounced at the secondary school level, where there were only 600 teachers. Furthermore, secondary schools existed only in towns. The First Party Congress responded to this problem by resolving to institute an eight-year compulsory system of free, basic education for children between ages seven and fifteen. Four years of primary education, provided free of charge, began at age seven. Secondary education, beginning at age eleven, lasted a further six years.

School enrollment, which rose very slowly considering Angola's youthful population, reflected the dire effects of the insurgency. In 1977 the government reported that more than 1 million primary school students were enrolled, as were about 105,000 secondary school students, roughly double the numbers enrolled in 1973. What proportions of the relevant age groups these students constituted was not known, but in the case of the primary school students it may have been almost two-thirds, and in that of secondary school students, perhaps a tenth to an eighth. Official government statistics released in 1984 showed that primary school enrollment had declined to 870,410, while secondary school enrollment (including vocational school and teacher training students) had increased to 151,759. This made for combined primary and secondary school enrollment consisting of 49 percent of the school-age population. By 1986 the primary school enrollment had increased to 1,304,145. Luanda's Agostinho Neto University, the country's only university, had an enrollment of 4,493 students in 1984, which had declined to 3,195 by 1986. A total of 72,330 people were enrolled in primary adult education programs in 1986.

The government began implementation of its education plan in close cooperation with its allies, particularly Cuba. Between 1978 and 1981, Cuba sent 443 teachers to Angola. According to an Angolan source, in 1987 an estimated 4,000 Angolan students, representing one-fourth of all foreign students from Africa, Asia, Latin America, and the Caribbean studying in Cuba, were attending Cuban elementary, middle, and college preparatory schools, as well as polytechnical institutes and the Superior Pedagogical Polytechnic Institute. Also in Cuba, assisting in the education of their compatriots, was a group of twenty-seven Angolan teachers. In addition, the Soviet Union participated in Angolan education programs. More than 1,000 Angolan students had graduated from intermediate and specialized higher education programs in the Soviet Union by the end of 1987, at which time 100 Soviet lecturers were teaching at Agostinho Neto University, the Luanda Naval School, and the Institute of Geology and Cartography in the Angolan capital. By mid-1988 United States sources reported that 1,800 Angolan students were studying in the Soviet Union.

A number of Angolan organizations become active during the 1980s in the quest for better educational facilities.In 1987 the JMPLA launched a special campaign to recruit 1,000 young people to teach in primary schools in Luanda Province. The groups targeted by the campaign included secondary school and higher education graduates, as well as some workers. The OMA not only sponsored programs to teach women to read and write but was also involved in programs to reduce infant mortality and promote family planning. Even the military formed a special group in 1980, the eighth contingent of the Comrade Dangereux Brigade, whose basic function was to teach primary school; 6,630 brigade members were reported to have taught 309,419 students by 1987.

Despite the government's efforts, the UNITA insurgency prevented the construction of a new education system on the remains of that inherited from the Portuguese. The demands of the war had drained funds that could otherwise have been applied to building schools, printing books, and purchasing equipment. In 1988, according to the United States Center for Defense Information, the Angolan government spent more per capita on the military (US$892) than on education (US$310). The war in the southern and central regions of the country also prevented the spread of the school system; the consequences of the fighting, including UNITA attacks on schools and teachers and the massive displacement of rural populations in those areas, disrupted the education of hundreds of thousands of school-age children. Further damaging to Angola's future was that many of those studying abroad had either failed to complete their courses of study or had not returned to Angola.
