= Tando Zinze =

- Commune
- Location in Angola
- Country: Angola
- Province: Cabinda Province
- Time zone: UTC+1 (WAT)
- Climate: Aw

Tando Zinze is a city and commune of Angola, located in the province of Cabinda, adjacent to the border with the Democratic Republic of the Congo.

== See also ==
- Communes of Angola
