= Agostinho Neto University =

Public university in Luanda, Angola

Coordinates: 8°56′31″S 13°16′49″E

- Former names: University of Luanda; University of Angola
- Type: Public research university
- Established: 21 August 1962; 64 years ago
- Rector: Pedro Magalhães
- Location: Talatona, Angola
- Campus: Urban
- Website: uan.ao

The Agostinho Neto University (Portuguese: Universidade Agostinho Neto) is the largest public university of Angola, based in Luanda and in the nearby city of Talatona, in Angola. In the academic year 2005–06, 68 licensing courses were ministered by the university: 18 in Bachelor's and 15 in master's degrees, involving areas of scientific knowledge in the faculties, institutes, and higher learning schools. It is one of seven public (state owned) universities in Angola.

Until 2009 the Agostinho Neto University was the country's only public university, and had campuses in all its major cities. In 2009 it was split up, with its campuses outside Luanda becoming six autonomous universities, located in Benguela, Cabinda, Huambo, Lubango, Malange, and Uíge. Agostinho Neto University is now one of the seven regional university among others, serving Luanda Province and Bengo Province. It remains the largest university in Angola.

== History ==
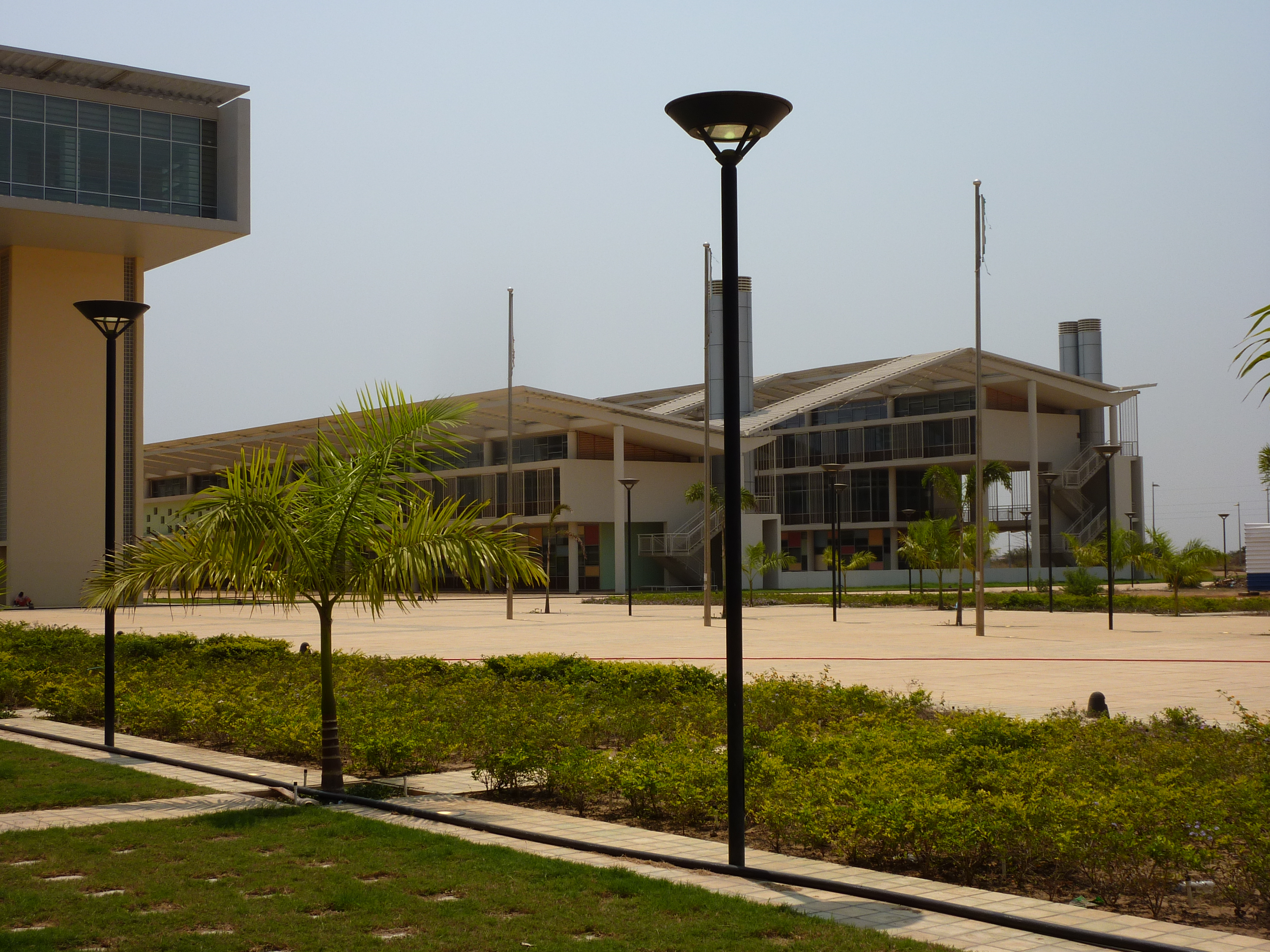
The headquarters campus, called University City of Camama, in the municipality of Talatona, Angola.

Two state-run university institutions were founded in colonial Portuguese Africa in 1962 by the Portuguese Ministry of the Overseas, then headed by Adriano Moreira. They were the Estudos Gerais Universitários de Angola in the former Overseas Province of Angola and the Estudos Gerais Universitários de Moçambique in the former Overseas Province of Mozambique, both awarding degrees ranging from engineering to medicine and from economics to agronomy. In 1968 the Estudos Gerais Universitários de Angola were renamed Universidade de Luanda (University of Luanda).

=== Post-independence ===
After Angolan independence from Portugal in 1975, the institution was renamed the University of Angola (Universidade de Angola). In 1985 it was renamed its current name, Agostinho Neto University, in honour of Agostinho Neto, the first President of Angola.

After independence the school's immediate priority was to produce secondary school teachers as part of a goal of the government's to boost post-primary education; this is why several ISCEDs (Institutos Superiores de Ciências da Educação, institutes for educational sciences) were founded in Luanda and other cities. At the same time the faculties inherited from colonial times were maintained and others added, so that the UAN came to include faculties of natural sciences, law, agricultural sciences, social sciences, humanities, economics, engineering, medicine, architecture, and nursing. These faculties were centred on campuses of the university across the country; for example, the faculty of agricultural sciences was/is based in the central Angolan town of Huambo which was known before independence by its numerous education facilities, especially the Portuguese-founded Agricultural Research Institute that was incorporated into the Faculty of Agricultural Sciences of the Agostinho Neto University.

=== De-centralization and autonomous regional universities ===
During the 2000s, the Angolan government came to the conclusion that the Universidade Agostinho Neto had grown beyond any manageable size. In 2009–2010 it reduced it to the campuses in Luanda and Bengo Provinces. All other campuses were integrated into newly created autonomous regional universities, in Benguela (Universidade Katyavala Bwila), Cabinda (Universidade 11 de Novembro), Huambo (Universidade José Eduardo dos Santos), Lubango (Universidade Mandume ya Ndemufayo), Malange (Universidade Lueij A'Nkonde), and Uíge (Universidade Kimpa Vita).

An exception are the Faculties of Education (Instituto Superior de Ciências da Educação, ISCED) in Lubango, which continue to be part of the Agostinho Neto University.

== Structure ==
In 2011, the Universidade Agostinho Neto comprised the following units:

- Faculty of Architecture and Fine Arts (Luanda)
- Faculty of Natural Sciences (Talatona)
- Faculty of Social Sciences (Talatona)
- Faculty of Law (Luanda)
- Faculty of Economics (Talatona)
- Faculty of Engineering (Talatona)
- Faculty of Humanities (Talatona)
- Faculty of Medicine (Luanda)
- Higher Institute of Health Sciences (Caxito) – with a nursing school.
- Faculties of Educational Sciences (Talatona)
- Higher Institute of Tourism (Talatona)
- Higher Politechnical Institute (Viana)

In the context of the construction of a large unified campus in the 2010s, a partial revision of this structure is scheduled. Also, all major faculties are to introduce postgraduate courses permitting to obtain MA/Msc as well as doctoral degrees.

== Finances ==
The university depends overwhelmingly on state funding. It has evening study programs for jobholders requiring fees.

The university, and some of the private universities, have benefited from contributions by sponsors operating within the country, such as the oil companies and diamond mining companies, as well as diverse international organizations.

== Notable alumni ==
- Albina Africano, Angolan politician
- Armando Manuel, Angolan politician
- Fernando da Piedade Dias dos Santos, Angolan politician
- Lopito Feijóo, Angolan writer
- Manuel Vicente, Angolan politician
- João Baptista Borges, former Angolan Minister of Energy and Water
- Guilhermina Prata, Angolan lawyer and politician
- Luís Gomes Sambo, minister of health
- Paulino Domingos Baptista, politician and diplomat
- Rui Jorge Carneiro Mangueira, lawyer, diplomat and politician
- Florbela Malaquias, politician, journalist and lawyer

== See also ==
- History of education in Angola
- Schools in Luanda
- Universities in Angola
