= Massabi =

Coordinates: 4°58′S 12°05′E

- Commune
- Location in Angola
- Country: Angola
- Province: Cabinda Province
- Time zone: UTC+1 (WAT)
- Climate: Aw

Massabi is a commune of Angola, located in Cacongo municipality in province of Cabinda.

== See also ==
- Communes of Angola
