= Luanda International School =

International school in Luanda, Angola (established 1996)

Location
- Via S6, Bairro de Talatona, Município de Belas; Luanda; Angola
- Coordinates: 8.9145°S 13.1901°E

Information
- Other name: LIS
- Type: Private international school
- Established: 1996
- Director: Dylan Hughes
- Staff: 89
- Grades: Preschool–12
- Gender: Co-educational
- Enrollment: 686
- Language: English
- Accreditation: International Baccalaureate; New England Association of Schools and Colleges; Council of International Schools
- Website: www.lisluanda.com

Luanda International School (LIS) is an international school in Luanda, Angola. Established in October 1996 by five people interested in the creation of an English-medium international school in Angola, it is supported by oil companies to benefit the families of their employees. LIS is an International Baccalaureate World School (IB) and is authorized to offer all three International Baccalaureate programs. It is the largest international school in Luanda, and is accredited by the New England Association of Schools and Colleges, and the Council of International Schools.

== History ==
Luanda International School opened on 26 October 1996, enrolling 27 students. It was located in the city of Luanda at Rua de Cambambe, 21–23, Bairro de Patrice Lumumba. Founders of the school included Roger Ballard Tremeer, South African Ambassador to Angola at that time; Carmen Campbell-Hewitt, the school's founding Principal; and three interested parents: Florbela Lopes, Emilienne Macauley, and Doreen Verster.

Before 2003, the school had moved to its current location at Via S6, Bairro de Talatona, Município de Belas Luanda.

== Facilities ==
In 2003 the school engaged Flansburg architects of Boston to create a master plan for its existing 6.5 hectare (16 acre) campus, as well as for a new 4 hectare (10 acre) site, called the "annex", which would house the lower elementary school. According to the plan, "upper elementary, secondary school, and central administration are to remain on the existing campus". Michael Specter of The New Yorker described the campus as "beautiful and modern".

LIS is the largest international school in Luanda. The school can expand to include a maximum of 950 students.

== Curriculum ==
LIS is an International Baccalaureate World School (IB) and is authorized to offer three International Baccalaureate programs: Primary Years Program, Middle Years Program and the IB Diploma Program. These programs form the framework for an inquiry-based approach to learning and teaching. For example, in 2017 CNN featured a student who was working on a project to raise awareness of child trafficking.

The school offers a proactive counselling program.

LIS is accredited by the New England Association of Schools and Colleges, and the Council of International Schools.

== Faculty ==
For the 2019/2020 academic year, there were 89 teaching staff. According to Specter, "The staff is made up largely of foreign teachers, who tend to move every few years among the world's élite international schools."

== Enrollment ==
At the start of the 2019/2020 academic year, enrollment was 689 students. The school's enrollment includes 55 nationalities.

Embassy families and families of employees of BP, Chevron, Eni, Exxon/Esso, Halliburton, and Schlumberger are given priority in enrollment. Specter wrote, "Fees, which are almost always paid by oil companies, come to about sixty thousand dollars a year. Some companies even pay when they don't have a student who needs the seat."

== Controversy ==
In 2018, national employees of the school filed a complaint asking "the Ministry of Public Administration, Labor and Social Security ( MAPTSS) carry out a 'very thorough investigation' of that organization..." based on "alleged mistreatment that national workers have been subjected to, as well as the remuneration asymmetries that most benefit foreign workers". The specific complaints included that "foreigners have the right to residence, water and electricity, transportation with a driver, food, health insurance (SOS international), domestic workers, stress subsidies and wage arrears abroad, wages abroad, and annual performance allowance, while national officials are simply entitled to wages, transportation, and food."
