= Bush school movement =

Bush school, late 19th century

The bush school movement was an educational movement in 19th-century Namibia started by Finnish missionaries. Those who had learnt to read had to teach others.

== History ==
In 1876 the Finnish mission published a first literacy primer. Because the Finnish missionaries had made literacy a requirement for baptism and membership in the church, they developed a system to spread literacy. Everyone who learnt to read had to teach others. The bush schools would meet under a tree on weekdays and teachers would meet on a Saturday to discuss of the coming lessons. It was one of the most successful projects to convert indigenous people to Christianity.

The teachers had no formal training except the reading lessons they had been given, but from 1913 forward they could enter formal teachers' training at the Finnish mission's teachers training college at Oniipa in 1913.

South African officials had become apprehensive of mission education by the 1930s, and were concerned by the bush school movement.
