= Malange =

Commune in Bourgogne-Franche-Comté, France

- Commune
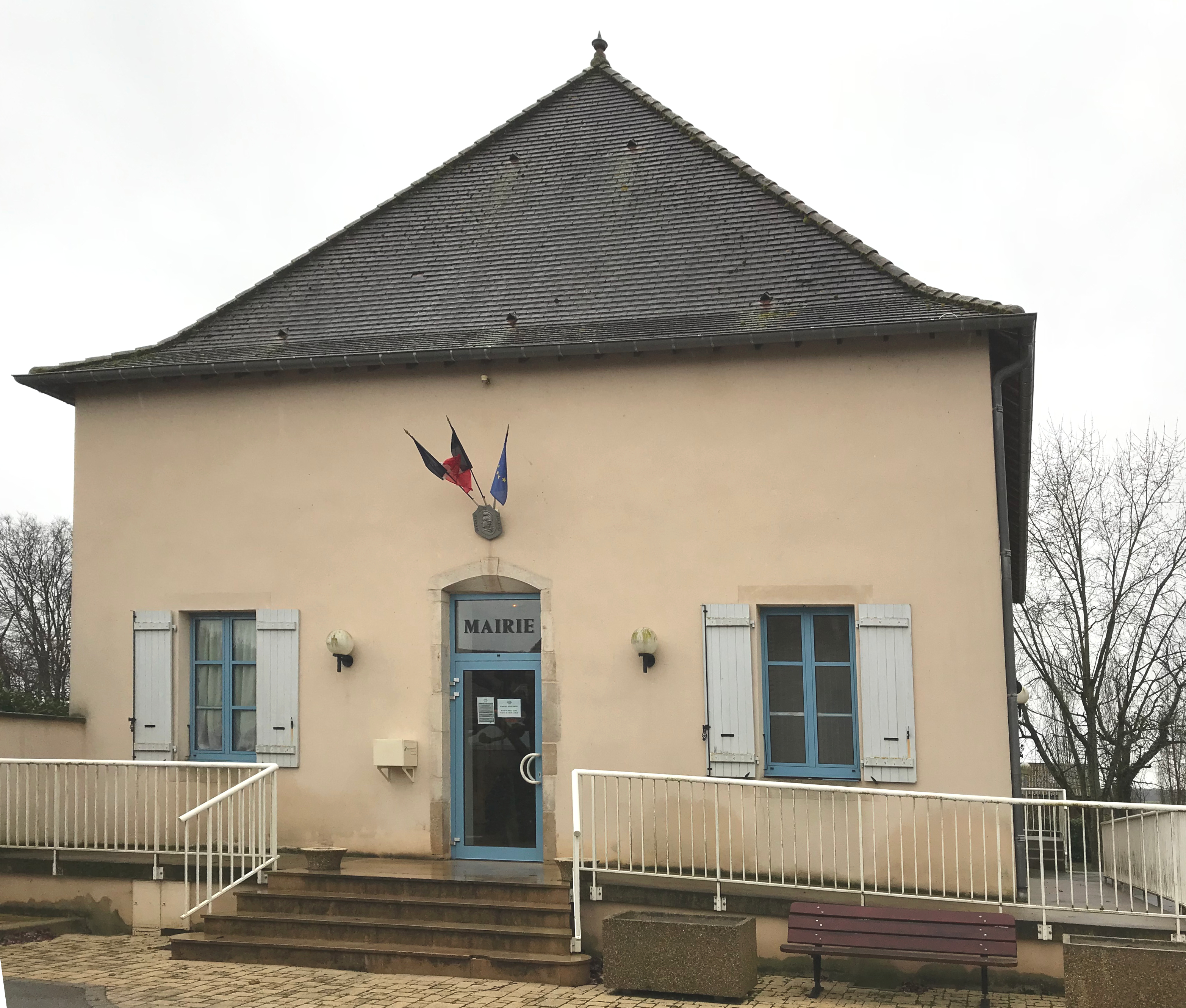
- The town hall in Malange
- Location of Malange
- Location within France Location within Bourgogne-Franche-Comté
- Coordinates: 47°10′37″N 5°36′55″E
- Country: France
- Region: Bourgogne-Franche-Comté
- Department: Jura
- Arrondissement: Dole
- Canton: Authume
- Intercommunality: CA Grand Dole

Government
  - Mayor (2020–2026): Hervé Guibelin
- Area^{1}: 8.40 km^{2} (3.24 sq mi)
- Highest elevation: 391 m (1,283 ft)
- Lowest elevation: 212 m (696 ft)
- Population (2023): 321
  - Density: 38.2/km^{2} (99.0/sq mi)
- Time zone: UTC+01:00 (CET)
  - Summer (DST): UTC+02:00 (CEST)
- INSEE/Postal code: 39308 /39700
- ^{1} French Land Register data, which excludes lakes, ponds, glaciers > 1 km^{2} (0.386 sq mi or 247 acres) and river estuaries.

Malange (French pronunciation: [malɑ̃ʒ]) is a commune in the Jura department in Bourgogne-Franche-Comté in eastern France.

== Population ==
Historical population
Year	Pop.	±% p.a.
1968	143	—
1975	213	+5.86%
1982	213	+0.00%
1990	199	−0.85%
1999	241	+2.15%
2007	265	+1.19%
2012	302	+2.65%
2017	321	+1.23%
2023	321	+0.00%
Source: INSEE

== See also ==
- Communes of the Jura department
