= University of Luanda =

Public university in Angola

- Type: Public university
- Established: 29 October 2020; 5 years ago
- Location: Luanda, Angola
- Campus: Urban

The University of Luanda (UniLuanda; Portuguese: Universidade de Luanda) is an Angolan public university based in the city of Luanda.

The university emerged from the merger of the Higher Institute for Information and Communication Technologies and the Higher Institute of Management, Logistics and Transport, and from the transformation of the faculties of arts and social service. Before the creation of UniLuanda, they were autonomous higher education institutions spread across the province of Luanda.

The university's base territory is the Luanda Province.

== History ==
UniLuanda's component bodies emerged from decree-law 7/09, of 12 May 2009, approved by the Council of Ministers, which created the Higher Institute for Information and Communication Technologies (ISUTIC) and the Higher Institute of Social Service (ISSS). The same decree also created the Instituto Superior de Artes (ISArt), but it only came into operation in 2013.

In 2016, presidential order 38/16, of 24 March 2016, created the Higher Institute of Management, Logistics and Transport (IPGEST).

By presidential decree 285, of 29 October 2020 — which reorganizes the Network of Public Higher Education Institutions of Angola (RIPES) — these institutions were integrated into the newly formed University of Luanda (UniLuanda). The ISUTIC and the IPGEST remained as institutes, while the Faculty of Social Service and the Faculty of Arts were constituted.

== Notable alumni ==
- Maria de Jesus Trovoada, politician and scientist
