= Independence Day (Brazil) =

National holiday in Brazil

Independence Day Dia da Independência
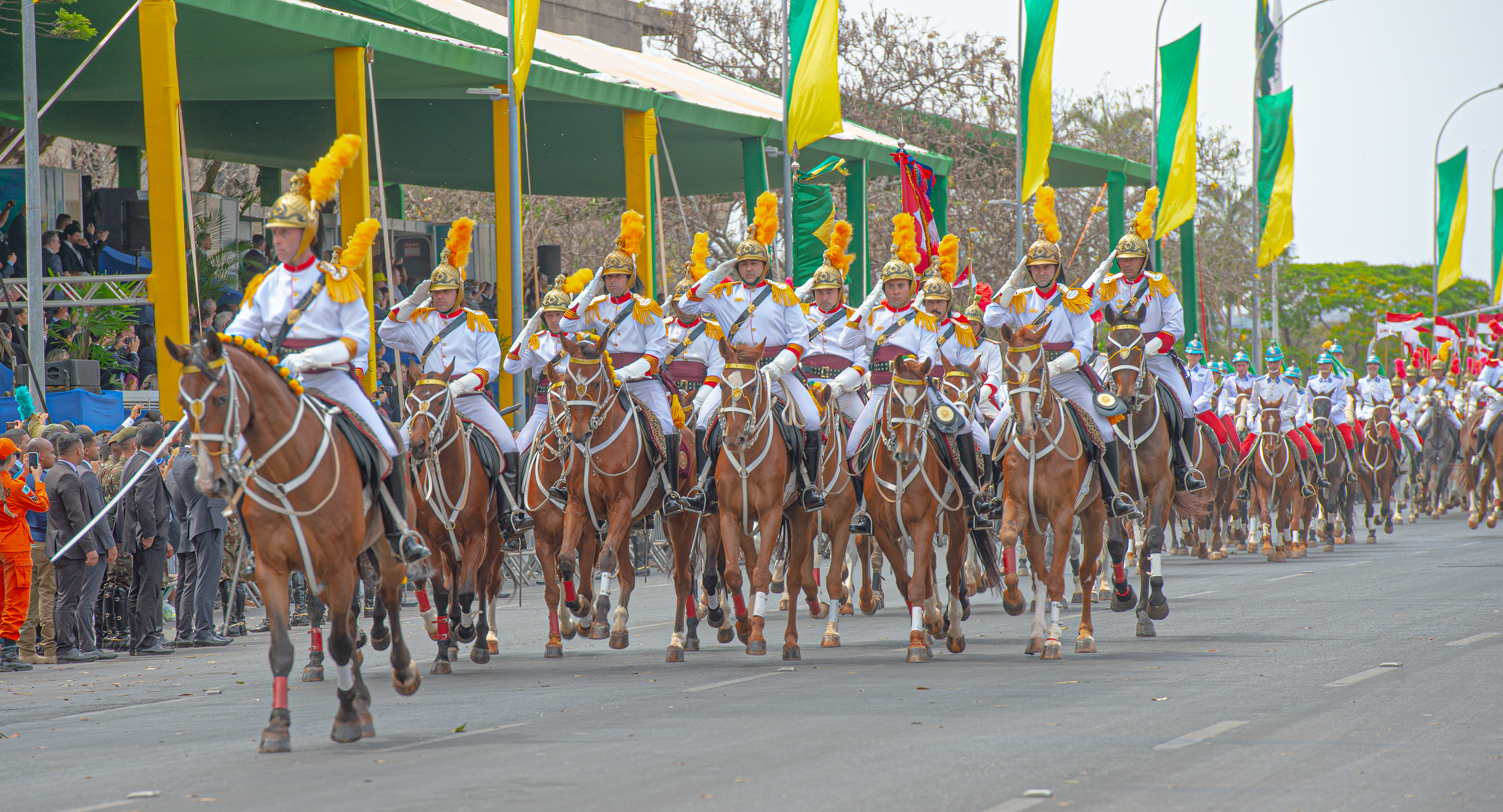
- Bicentennial Independence Day parade in Brasília, 2022
- Also called: Sete de Setembro (7 September); Dia da Pátria (Day of the Fatherland)
- Observed by: Brazil
- Type: National
- Significance: The day of the Declaration of Independence of Brazil
- Celebrations: Parades and concerts
- Date: 7 September
- Next time: 7 September 2027
- Frequency: annual

The Independence Day of Brazil (Portuguese: Dia da Independência, Portuguese pronunciation: [ˈdʒi.ɐ dɐ ĩdepẽˈdẽsjɐ]), commonly called Sete de Setembro ([ˈsɛtʃi dʒi seˈtẽbɾu], 'Seven of September'), is a national holiday observed in Brazil on 7 September of every year. The date celebrates Brazil's Declaration of Independence from the United Kingdom of Portugal, Brazil and the Algarves on 7 September 1822.

== Background ==
In 1808, French troops commanded by Emperor Napoleon Bonaparte invaded Portugal as a retaliation for the Iberian country's refusal to participate in the trade embargo against the United Kingdom. Fleeing persecution, the Portuguese monarchs transferred the Portuguese Court from Lisbon to Rio de Janeiro, then capital of Colonial Brazil. In 1815, prince regent John VI created the United Kingdom of Portugal, Brazil and the Algarves, elevating Brazil to the rank of kingdom and increasing its administrative independence. Brazil, Portugal, and Great Britain were the three major contributors to the Independence of Brazil all three motivated by the circumstances peculiar to each. Brazil's Independence was ultimately won through diplomacy after three years of war against Portugal.

== Origin ==
Prince Pedro declares the Independence of Brazil on 7 September 1822. "Independência ou Morte" (Independence or death) (1888), oil on canvas painting by Pedro Américo.

A political revolution erupted in Portugal in 1820, forcing the royal family to return. John VI's heir, Pedro, Prince of Brazil, remained in Brazil. In 1821, the Portuguese Assembly demanded Brazil to return to its former condition of colony and the return of the heir prince to Portugal. Pedro, influenced by the Rio de Janeiro Senate (Senado da Câmara) refused to return on 9 January 1822, a date which became known as Dia do Fico (I'll Stay Day).

On 2 September 1822, a new decree with Lisbon's demands arrived in Rio de Janeiro, while Prince Pedro was in São Paulo. Princess Maria Leopoldina, acting as Princess Regent, met with the Council of Ministers and decided to send her husband a letter advising him to proclaim Brazil's independence. The letter reached Prince Pedro on 7 September 1822. That same day, in a famous scene at the shore of the Ipiranga River, he declared the country's independence, ending 322 years of colonial dominance of Portugal over Brazil. On the day of Prince Pedro's proclamation he was declaring a fact for the foundations of a new state had already been laid. According to journalist Laurentino Gomes, who wrote a book about the event, Prince Pedro "could not wait for his arrival to São Paulo to announce the decision". Gomes adds that "he was a reckless man in his decisions but he had the profile of leader that Brazil needed at the time, because there was no time to think".

== Observance ==
- Federal law N° 662, issued on 4 April 1949, made Independence Day a paid federal holiday.
- Federal law N° 5.571, issued on 28 November 1969, established the protocol for the Independence Day celebration.

== Celebration ==
=== In Brazil ===
Independence Day is a national holiday marked by patriotic displays and military parades in most Brazilian cities.

In Brasília, the national celebration takes place at the Ministries Esplanade with a civil-military parade in the presence of the President of Brazil, who is Commander in Chief of the Armed Forces. Around 30,000 people attend the event each year, which costs about one million reais. Similar military and civil parades are held in all the state capitals, and in many major cities throughout the country.

The national commemorations are broadcast on cable channel TV NBR and public TV station TV Brasil. In 2016, in honor of that year's Rio de Janeiro Summer Olympic Games, portions of that city's parade were aired on the channel. Until 1959 all national parades were held there as it was the former capital city. By 2017 TV NBR also began broadcasting snippets of the São Paulo parade, given that the city is the birthplace of the independent country.

=== Abroad ===
In New York City, the Brazilian Day is produced by João de Matos and held annually to celebrate the Independence Day. The event takes place at 46th Street, near Times Square, in Manhattan. The Brazilian Day concert is the centerpiece of the event, featuring famous Brazilian musicians, such as Ivete Sangalo, Chitãozinho & Xororó, Skank, Sandy & Junior, Cláudia Leitte, and Banda Calypso. In 2008, the event drew a crowd of 1.5 million people, according to the New York City Police Department. The Brazilian television network Globo sponsors the event and airs it live to Brazil and over 115 countries through Globo International Network.

Similar events are held in Deerfield Beach, Florida, San Diego, Toronto, Los Angeles, and London, United Kingdom.

These events consist of a civil parade, concerts of Brazilian music and exhibitions of Brazilian dances and martial arts.

== National Independence Day parade in Brasília ==
The national celebrations in the federal capital Brasília, held since 1960, are the biggest of all the parades held nationwide on this most important day for Brazilians. As already mentioned, the President of Brazil, in his/her constitutional mandate as Commander in Chief of the Armed Forces, is the chief guest for the parade held annually in the capital's Ministries Esplanade, part of the Monumental Axis, taking the salute of a more than 9,000 to 24,000 strong civil-military contingent made up of civilians and servicemen and women of the armed forces, military police, military firefighters and civil law enforcement agencies representing all the states and territories of the republic, with a mobile column of around 90-800 vehicles, a medium mounted column and a big air flypast column of around 80-140 aircraft from the armed forces and civil security units. It is usually held in the mid-morning and is a nationally televised event. In recent years starting in the late 2000s, the presidential grandstand is situated in front of the building of the Ministry of Defense along the avenue, as a remember of the constitutional mandate granted to the presidential office to oversee the Armed Forces and the reserve organizations. Right there, as well as on the stands along the north side of the avenue, alongside the general public and tourists visiting the capital on this special day (with a combined total of more than 31,000 spectators in recent years) the following dignitaries are also present:

- Vice President
- General Board of the National Congress and the Bureaux of the Senate and Chamber of Deputies, as well as select Deputies and Senators
- Cabinet ministers, deputy ministers and persons with ministerial status
- Chairman of the Institutional Security Office of Brazil
- Presidents and vice presidents (Chief justices and deputy chief justices) of the judicial courts established by law
- The Chief of the Joint Staff of the Armed Forces, commanders of the service branches of the Armed Forces and commandants of the National Public Security Force, Federal District Military Police and Federal District Military Firefighters' Corps
- Heads of the Federal Police, Federal Railroad Police, Federal Highway Police, and the Civil Police of the Federal District
- Governor of the Federal District and the Speaker of the Legislative Chamber of the Federal District
- The diplomatic corps, foreign and national media representatives and military attaches
- Former Presidents, Vice Presidents and retired members of Congress and the judicial branch if present
- Veterans of the armed forces and civil security units
- Representatives of public and private sector firms and enterprises, including those of the defense industry

=== Arrival of the President and opening segment ===
At 9am the parade's ground, mounted and mobile columns assembled on the Esplanade present arms to honor the arrival of the President, who is received by the parade commander, a general officer of the Army with the rank of Lieutenant General holding the appointment of Commander of the Plantalto Military Command. Upon his/her arrival, the Brazilian National Anthem is played as a ceremonial gun section of the Cayenne Battery fires a 21-gun salute. Following this, the parade commander informs the president of the commencement of the parade inspection segment, and thus, as his/her vehicle, lead on by a motorcycle section of the Military Police, passes by all the parading units he/she salutes their respective unit color guards until all the units and the mobile and mounted columns have been inspected. Currently the starting point of the inspection is in front of the barracks of the 1st Military Firefighters Group of the Military Firefighters Corps of the Federal District.

The President then advances on the open-top vehicle, which then stops at the central grandstand. He/she departs from the vehicle and is welcomed by a ceremonial platoon of the 1st Guard Cavalry Regiment "Independence Dragoons" as he/she arrives there to meet the dignitaries. Following this, the regimental band sounds the "Continências ao Presidente da República", which are composed of the introduction and final chords of the Brazilian National Anthem, after the music stops the lancers depart and a colour guard from the Ministry of Education of the Federal District arrive near the band, alongside the choir from the Military College of Brasilla, which positions near it. As the colour guard renders a salute, the National Anthem is played followed by the Hino da Independência.

Following this the parade commander, escorted by a joint-service staff of the Armed Forces and the public security organizations, in recent years mounted on the nationally produced Guarani AFV, is driven to the presidential grandstand to give the opening report to the president informing him/her of the commencement of the national parade, in the following manner:

Parade commander: Mr./Mrs. President, sir/ma'am, the commander of the Planalto Military Command, (states name and rank), has informed you to seek permission for the start of the parade, sir/ma'am.
President: Commenced, sir!

The commander then takes his place on the central median strip across the northbound lane of the Esplanade to begin the parade on his vehicle.

=== Veterans and civil parade ===
Since the parade of 1960 the National Defence League of Brazil's National Symbolic Flame Torch leads the civil parade segment. The idea of the flame is a symbolic representation of the national spirit and of the values of patriotism, service to the country and love for the people that it represents, as well as to continue to kindle the legacies of centuries of Brazilian history. The flame is carried by a national athlete escorted by the Military College of Brasília and a fanfare trumpet team from the Military Firefighters Corps of the Federal District. The athlete carrying the torch presents it to the President and to the other dignitaries to the tune of the opening bars of the Overture of Il Guarany, and then marches off.

The torch relay team is followed by an athletic contingent and then by a veterans contingent made up of:

- Living veterans of the Brazilian Expeditionary Force (if any) and FEB reenactors
- Ex-Servicemen's Association and Friends of War Veterans of the Federal District
- Veterans' associations of the Navy, Marine Corps, Army and Air Force
- Veterans and ex-service personnel of the Brazilian Armed Forces' peacekeeping operations

Following the veterans is a schools contingent under the Ministry of Education of the Federal District. A number of elementary and secondary schools, as well as school marching bands and young athletes and dancers from the capital region are represented.

=== Military parade segment ===
The military parade segment is led by a parade commander, usually a brigadier general, together with a joint service staff and colour guard from the armed forces and security organizations, all mounted on vehicles (mostly nationally manufactured). It is the most awaited part of the parade, featuring men and women of the armed forces and the federal and regional public security and emergency forces, military bands and drum and bugle corps, and the mostly nationally produced ground and air equipment of these organizations.

==== Full order of the military parade ground column ====
Following the parade commander and his staff, the parade's ground column marches past in the following arrangement:

- Brazilian Navy
  - Brazilian Marine Pipes, Drum and Bugle Corps and Silent Drill Platoon of the Naval Battalion Rio de Janeiro
  - Commander and staff
  - Color Guard of the 7th Naval District
  - Battalion of the Corps of Cadets, Brazilian Naval School
  - Women's contingent
  - Recruits of seamen training schools
  - Battalion from the 7th Naval District
  - Brasília Capital Marine Guards Group (Public Duties)
  - CBRN Marine Battalion
  - Company from the Marine Special Operations Battalion "Tonelero"
  - Naval Aviation
  - Naval Police
- Brazilian Army
  - Band and Pipes and Drums of the Presidential Guards Battalion
  - Commander and staff
  - Colour guard of the PMC and historical flags
  - Military College of Brasília
    - Regimental band
    - Commandant
    - Colour guard
    - Companies of the Corps of Cadets
  - Academia Militar das Agulhas Negras
  - Reserve Officers Formation Center
  - Women's contingent
  - Planalto Force Battalion of the PMC's 3rd Motorized Infantry Brigade
  - Guard of honour company of the PGB
  - Army Police
  - Special Operations Command Company
  - Army Aviation
- Brazilian Air Force
  - Band of the 1st Air Force Wing
  - Commander and staff
  - Colour guard
  - Cadet Group of the Brazilian Air Force Academy
  - Aircrew squadron
  - Women's squadron
  - Guard of Honour Squadron "Santos du Mont"
  - Security and Defence Group - Brasília
- Federal Police of Brazil
  - Agents of the FPB in the Brasillia area
  - Tactical Operations
- Federal Highway Police
- National Public Security Force
  - Command and staff
  - Representative battalion
- Military Police of the Federal District
  - Band of the Military Police of the Federal District
  - Command and staff K
  - Colour Guard
  - Tiradentes Military College
  - Military Police Academy
    - Officer cadets
    - NCO cadet company
  - Special Missions Command
  - Metropolitan Police companies
  - Environmental police
  - Police stations, kai
- Military Firefighters Corps of the Federal District
  - Band of the Military Firefighters Corps of the Federal District
  - Command and staff
  - Colour guard
  - Emperor Dom Pedro II Military College
  - Military Firefighters Academy
  - Firefighters battalion
    - Female company
    - Male company
  - Special operations contingent
- Finale: Marching Band and Pipes and Drums of the Brazilian Army and the Drill Team Platoon of the Presidential Guards Battalion

== Gallery ==
=== Independence Day military parade ===
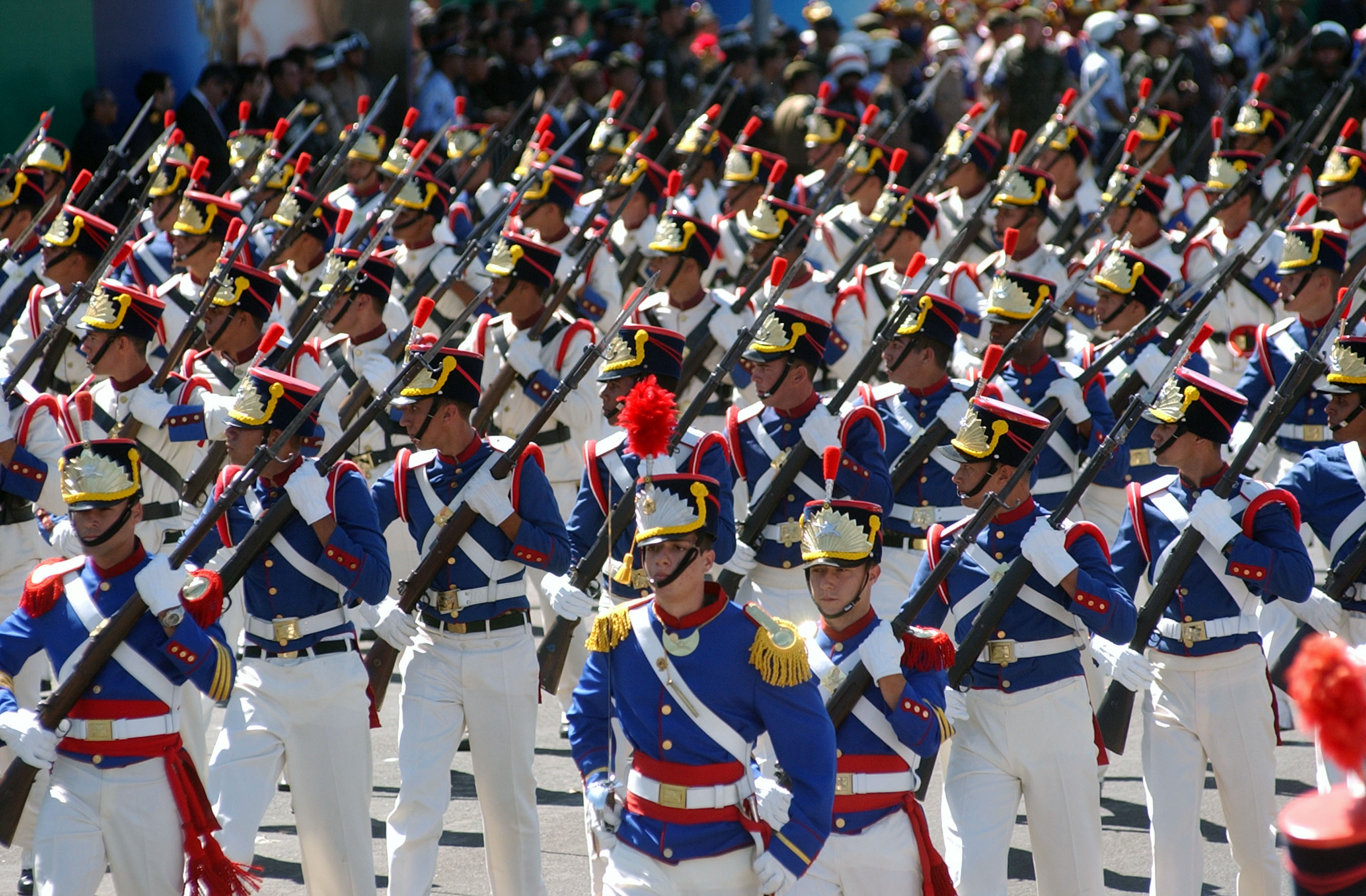
The Presidential Guard Battalion at the parade, 2007

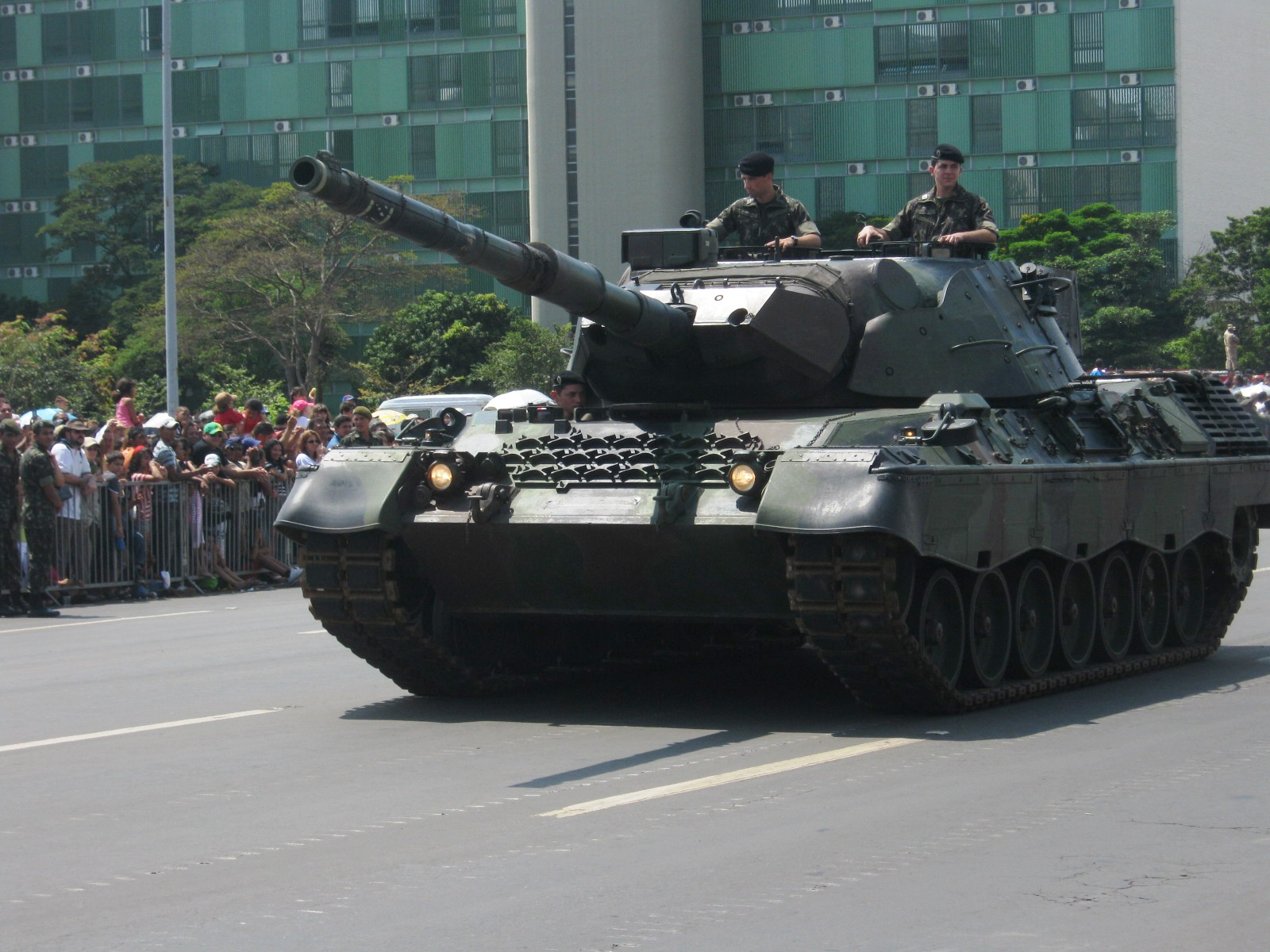
Leopard 1A5 main battle tank during the 2009 Independence Day military parade

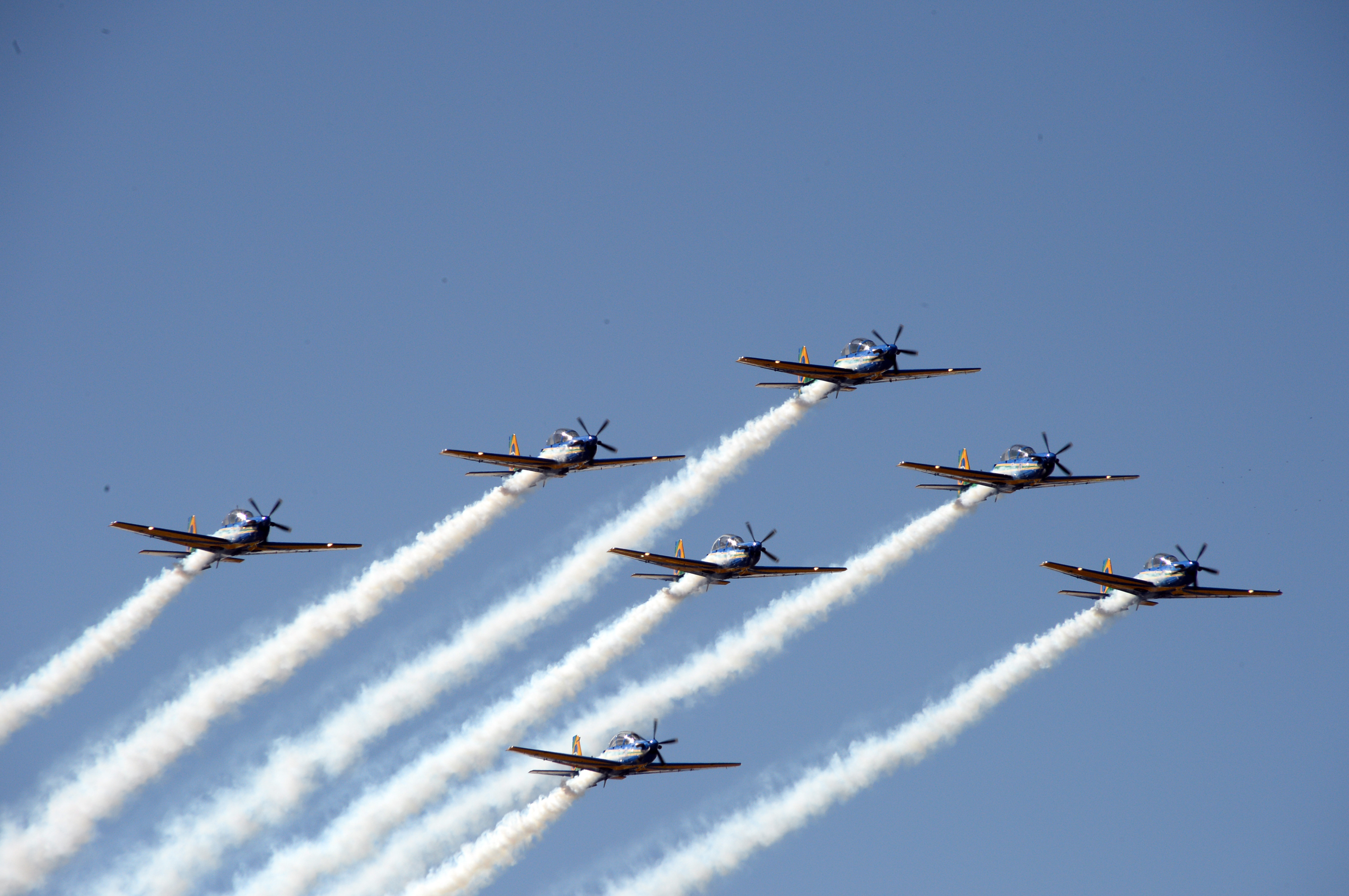
The Aerial Demonstration Squadron, popularly known as the Smoke Squadron.

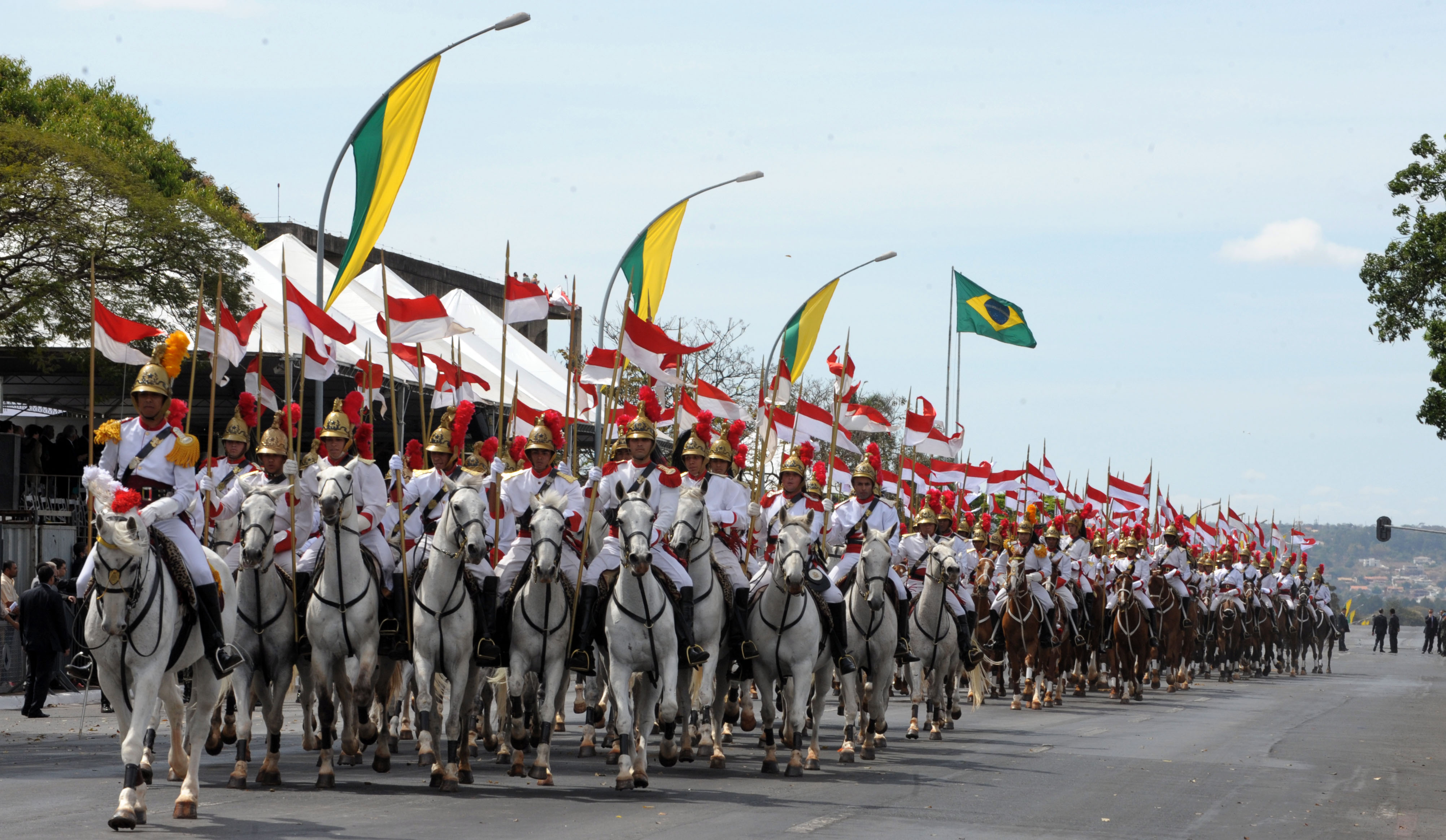
1st Guards Cavalry Regiment of the Army, known as the Independence Dragoons.

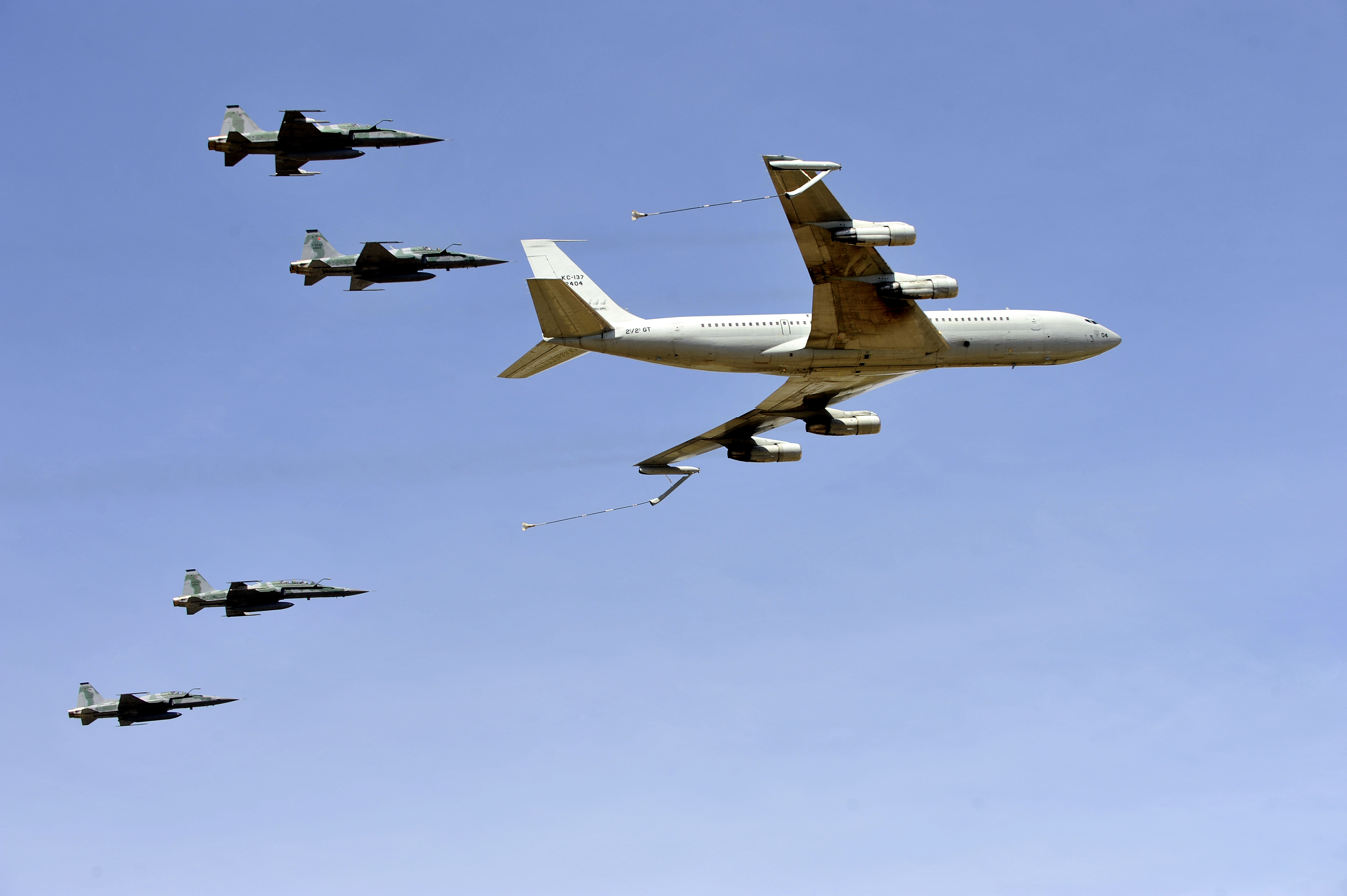
A Boeing C-137 Stratoliner (retired in 2013) followed by four Northrop F-5 jets.

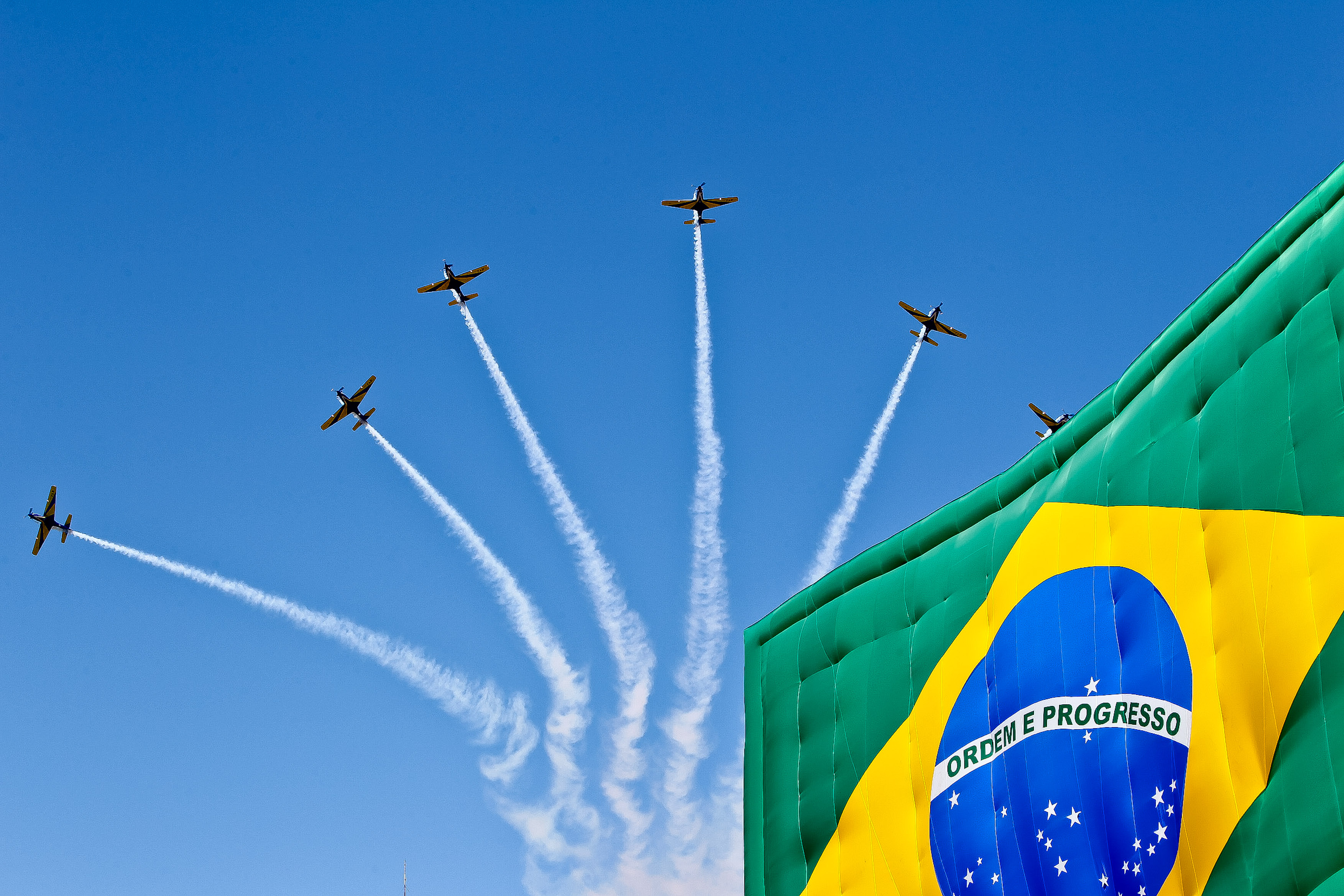
The Smoke Squadron

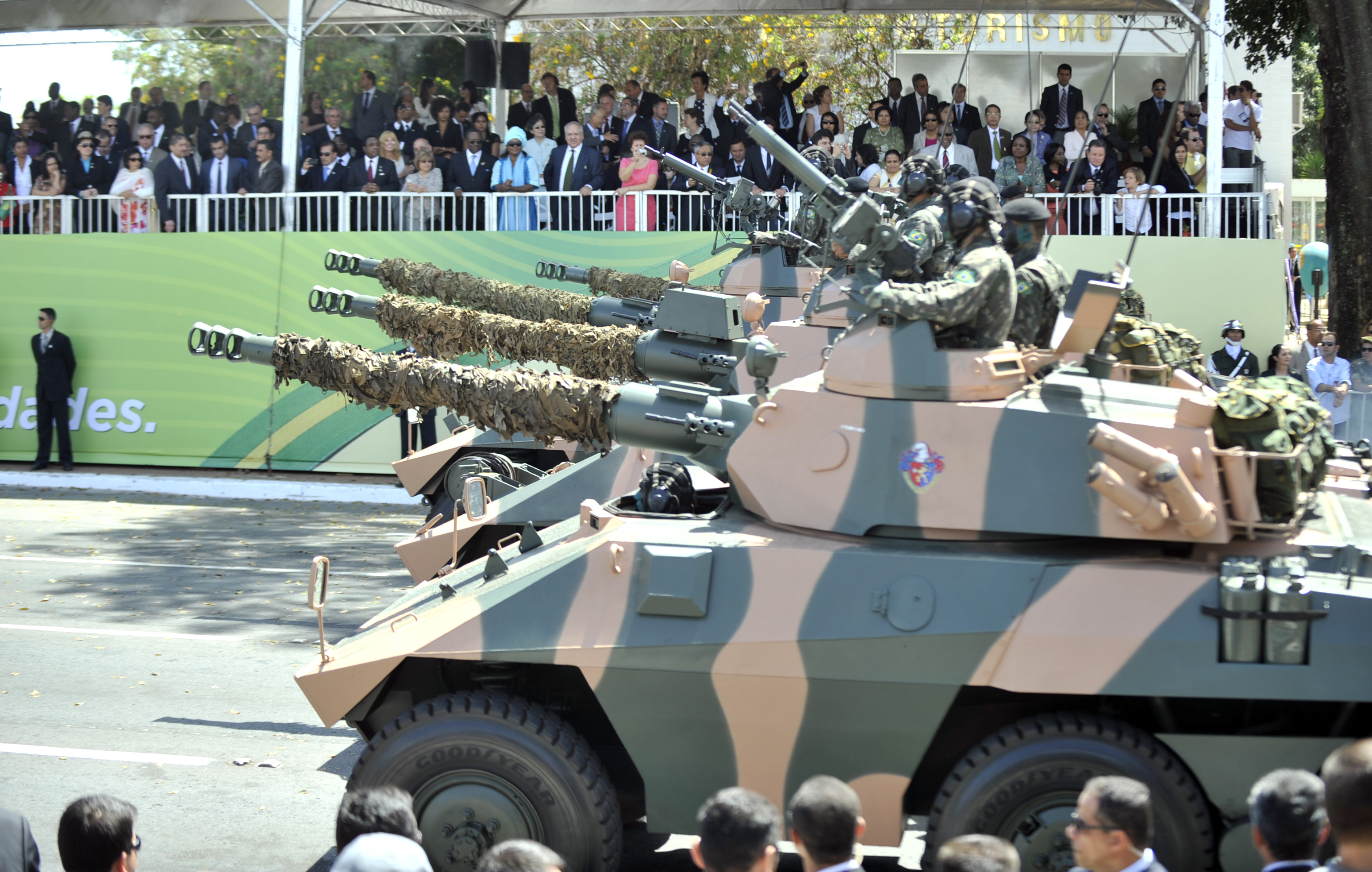
EE-9 Cascavel armoured vehicles

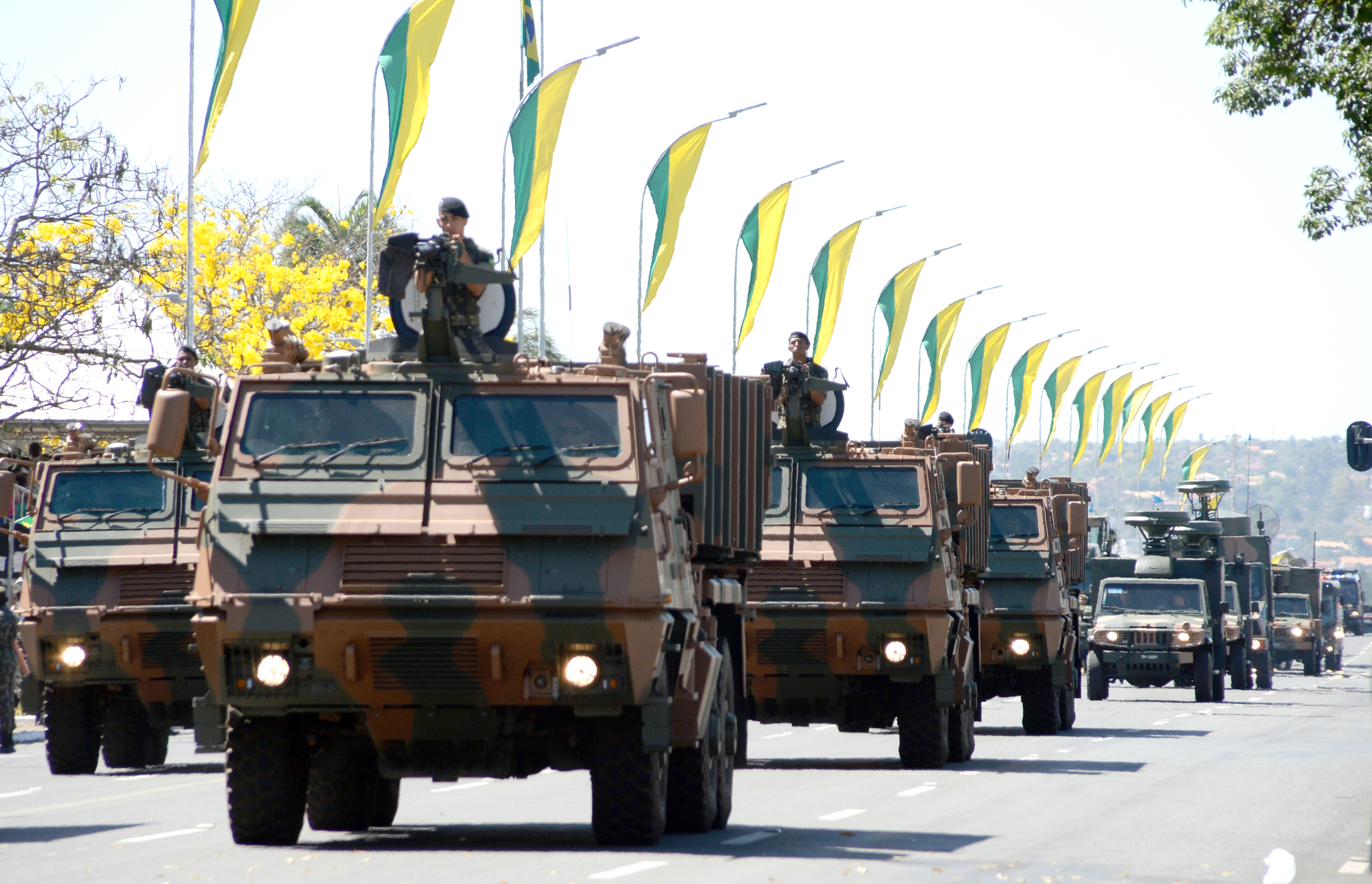
ASTROS 2020 multiple rocket launchers

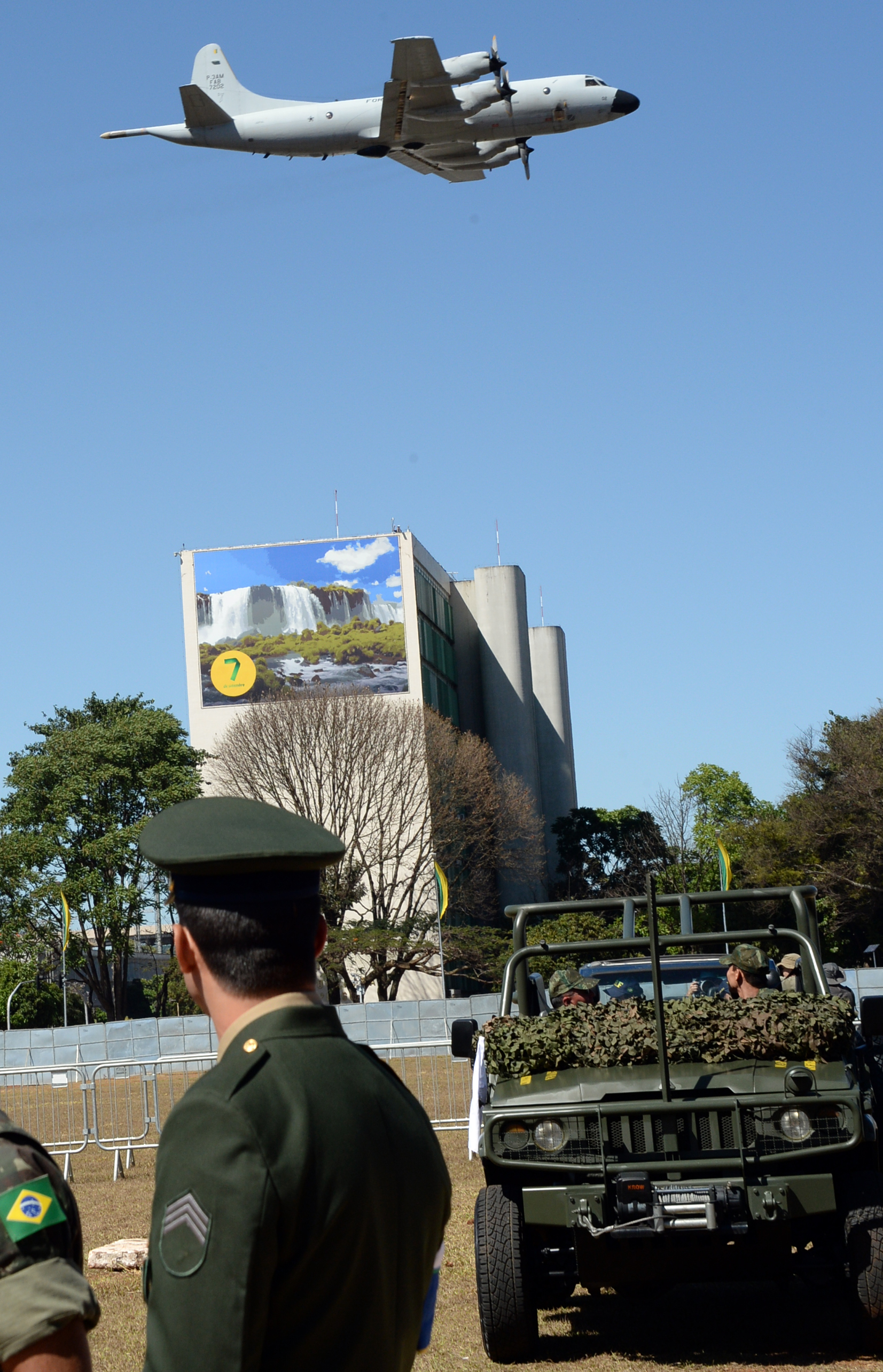
Lockheed P-3 Orion

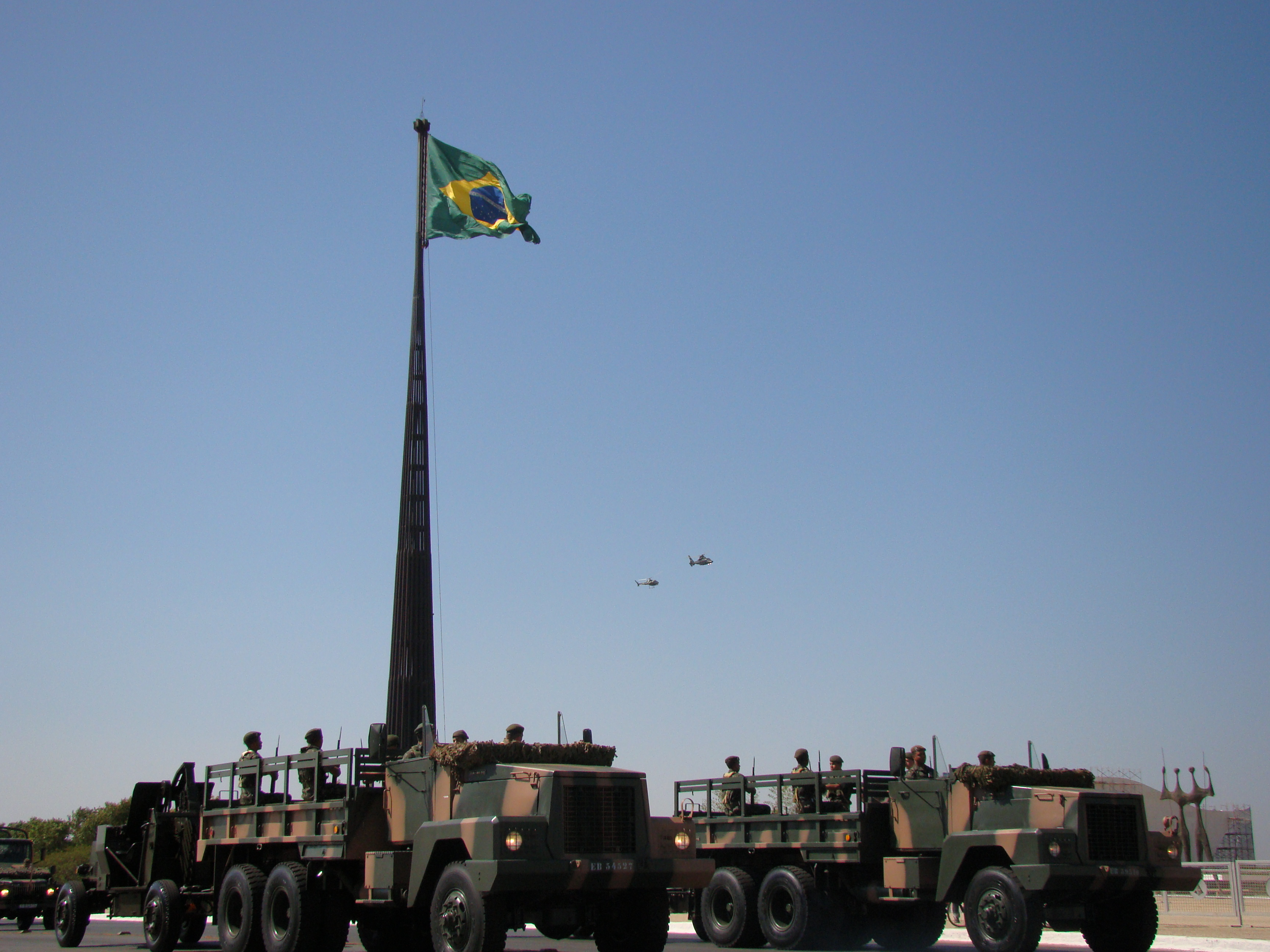
UAI M1-50 military trucks

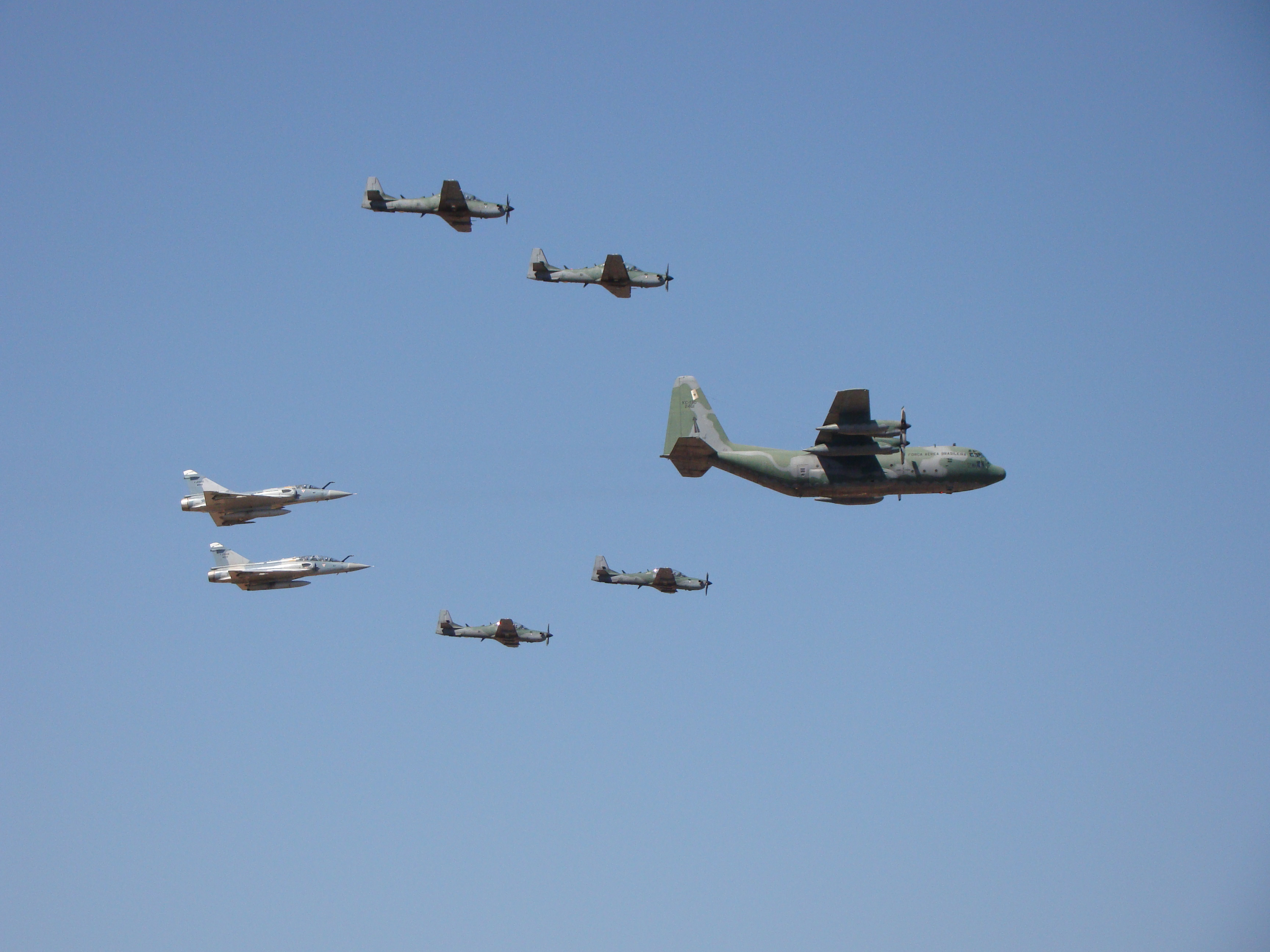
A KC-130, four A-29 Super Tucano light attack aircraft, and two Mirage 2000 jets

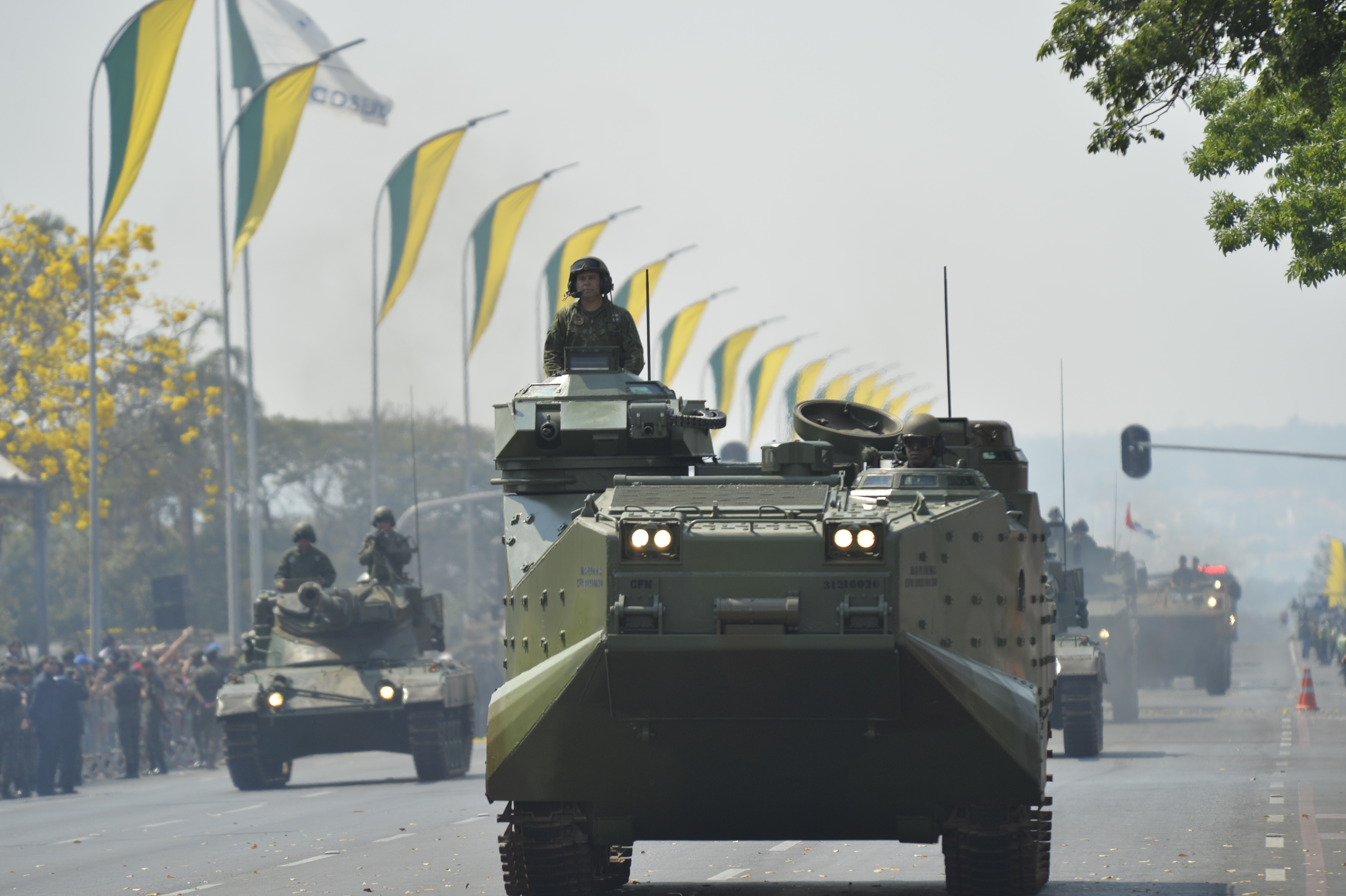
AAV-7A1 armored personnel carrier/assault amphibious
