= Hino da Independência =

Former Brazilian national anthem

English: Independence Anthem
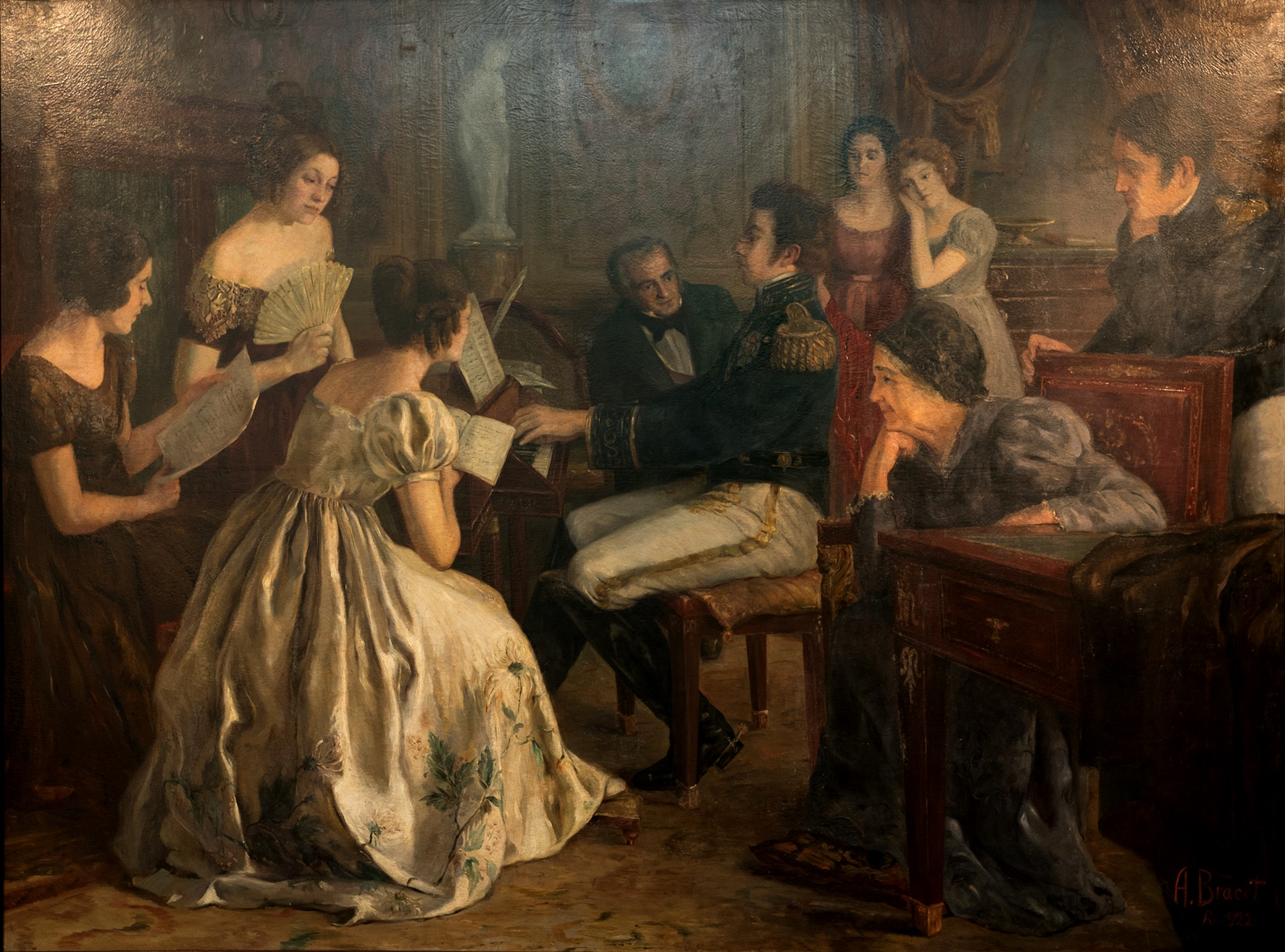
- Emperor Pedro I composing the anthem, in 1822. Painting Primeiros Sons do Hino da Independência by Augusto Bracet.
- Lyrics: Evaristo da Veiga, 1822
- Music: Dom Pedro I, 1824

Audio sample
- Hino da Independência: file; help

The Hino da Independência (Portuguese for Independence Anthem) is a Brazilian official patriotic song commemorating the country's declaration of independence from Portugal. The anthem was composed in 1822 by Emperor Pedro I, the lead figure in the country's struggle for independence, and the lyrics were written by poet Evaristo da Veiga.

It was used as the national anthem of Brazil until 1831, when the Emperor abdicated. It is sung on Independence Day celebrations in Brazil.

"Independence or Death!" from Pedro Américo, 1888

== Lyrics ==
Usually verses 3, 4, 5, 6, 8 and 10 (in italics) are nowadays omitted when the anthem of the Independence is sung.

Hino da Independência (Portuguese lyrics)	Anthem of Independence (English translation)
1 Já podeis, da Pátria filhos Ver contente a Mãe gentil; Já raiou a Liberdade No Horizonte do Brasil Já raiou a Liberdade Já raiou a Liberdade No Horizonte do Brasil	1 Already can you, sons of the Fatherland, See your gentle mother happy. Liberty has already risen At the horizon of Brazil. Liberty has already risen Liberty has already risen At the horizon of Brazil.
Refrão Brava Gente Brasileira Longe vá, temor servil; Ou ficar a Pátria livre, Ou morrer pelo Brasil. Ou ficar a Pátria livre, Ou morrer pelo Brasil.	Chorus Brave Brazilian people! Far begone, slavery's fear! Either keep the Fatherland free, Or die for Brazil. Either keep the Fatherland free, Or die for Brazil.
2 Os grilhões que nos forjava Da perfídia astuto ardil, Houve Mão mais poderosa, Zombou deles o Brasil. Houve Mão mais poderosa Houve Mão mais poderosa Zombou deles o Brasil.	2 The chains that forged for us Treachery's astute slyness, There was a most powerful Hand, Brazil sneered at them. There was a most powerful Hand, There was a most powerful Hand, Brazil sneered at them.
(Refrão)	(Chorus)
3 O Real Herdeiro Augusto Conhecendo o engano vil, Em despeito dos Tiranos Quis ficar no seu Brasil. Em despeito dos Tiranos Em despeito dos Tiranos Quis ficar no seu Brasil.	3 The August Royal Heir Knowing the vile deceit In spite of the Tyrants Wished to stay in his Brazil In spite of the Tyrants In spite of the Tyrants Wished to stay in his Brazil
(Refrão)	(Chorus)
4 Ressoavam sombras tristes Da cruel Guerra Civil, Mas fugiram apressadas Vendo o Anjo do Brasil. Mas fugiram apressadas Mas fugiram apressadas Vendo o Anjo do Brasil.	4 Sad shadows resounded From the cruel Civil War But they quickly fled Seeing the Angel of Brazil But they quickly fled But they quickly fled Seeing the Angel of Brazil
(Refrão)	(Chorus)
5 Mal soou na serra ao longe Nosso grito varonil; Nos imensos ombros logo A cabeça ergue o Brasil. Nos imensos ombros logo Nos imensos ombros logo A cabeça ergue o Brasil.	5 As soon as in far-off mountains sounded Our virile shout Upon great shoulders soon Brazil's head shall rise Upon great shoulders soon Upon great shoulders soon Brazil's head shall rise
(Refrão)	(Chorus)
6 Filhos clama, caros filhos, E depois de afrontas mil, Que a vingar a negra injúria Vem chamar-vos o Brasil. Que a vingar a negra injúria Que a vingar a negra injúria Vem chamar-vos o Brasil.	6 Clamour sons, beloved sons And after thousands of affronts To avenge the dark offense Brazil comes to call you To avenge the dark offense To avenge the dark offense Brazil comes to call you
(Refrão)	(Chorus)
7 Não temais ímpias falanges, Que apresentam face hostil: Vossos peitos, vossos braços São muralhas do Brasil. Vossos peitos, vossos braços Vossos peitos, vossos braços São muralhas do Brasil.	7 Do not fear unholy battalions, Who show their hostile face: Your chests, your arms Are the walls of Brazil. Your chests, your arms Your chests, your arms Are the walls of Brazil.
(Refrão)	(Chorus)
8 Mostra Pedro a vossa fronte Alma intrépida e viril: Tende nele o Digno Chefe Deste Império do Brasil. Tende nele o Digno Chefe Tende nele o Digno Chefe Deste Império do Brasil.	8 Pedro show us your countenance Your bold and virile soul Ye have in him the worthy Chief Of this Empire of Brazil Ye have in him the worthy Chief Ye have in him the worthy Chief Of this Empire of Brazil
(Refrão)	(Chorus)
9 Parabéns, oh Brasileiros, Já com garbo varonil Do Universo entre as Nações Resplandece a do Brasil. Do Universo entre as Nações Do Universo entre as Nações Resplandece a do Brasil.	9 Congratulations, O Brazilians, Already, with virile garb From the Universe among Nations Shines brightly that of Brazil. From the Universe among Nations From the Universe among Nations Shines brightly that of Brazil.
(Refrão)	(Chorus)
10 Parabéns; já somos livres; Já brilhante, e senhoril Vai juntar-se em nossos lares A Assembleia do Brasil. Vai juntar-se em nossos lares Vai juntar-se em nossos lares A Assembléia do Brasil.	10 Congratulations; we are already free; Already glowing, and noble. We will assemble in our homes, The Assembly of Brazil. We will assemble in our homes, We will assemble in our homes, The Assembly of Brazil.
(Refrão)	(Chorus)

== See also ==
- Brazilian National Anthem
- Hino da Carta
