= Primeiros Sons do Hino da Independência =

Painting by Augusto Bracet

First hearing of Independence Anthem
- Primeiros Sons do Hino da Independência
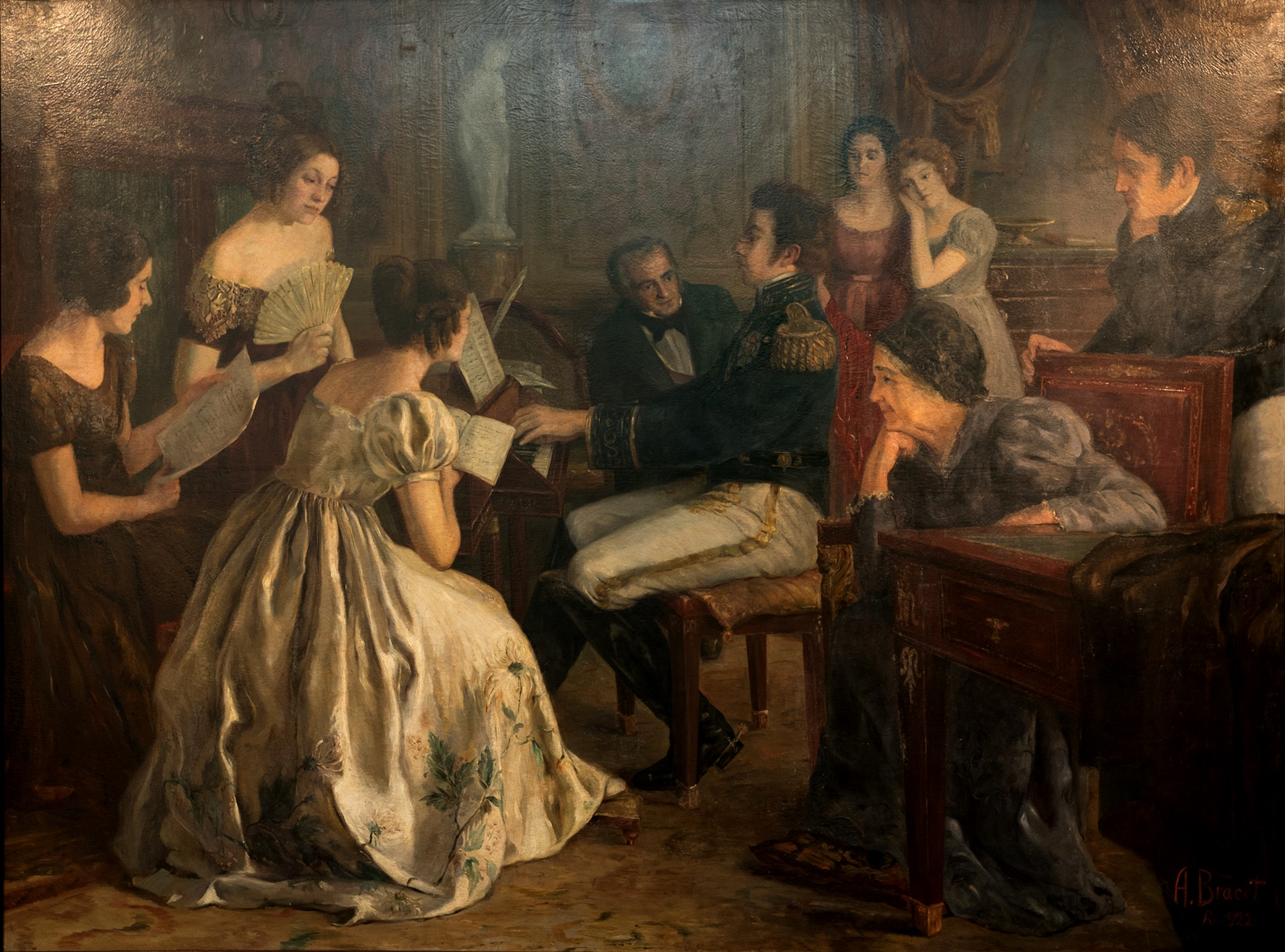
- Artist: Augusto Bracet
- Year: 1922
- Medium: oil paint, canvas
- Dimensions: 250.00 cm (98.43 in) × 190.00 cm (74.80 in)
- Location: National Historical Museum
- Accession: 6196

Primeiros Sons do Hino da Independência (First Sounds of the Independence Anthem), also known as Hino da Independência (Independence Anthem), is a painting by Augusto Bracet made in 1922. The artwork is a historical painting, and is displayed at the National Historical Museum of Brazil. It portrays, among others, Pedro I of Brazil and Evaristo da Veiga, in 1822.

== Composition ==
The artwork was made with oil on canvas. It measures 190 centimetres (75 in) in height and 250 centimetres (98 in) in width.

== Description ==
It portrays the composition of the Brazilian Independence Anthem. Dom Pedro I, the composer of the music, is drawn sitting on a piano chair, apparently surrounded by people from the Court, composing the anthem.

The portrayal is based on the memory of Francisco Canto de Mello. An excerpt from his writings was shown at the first public exhibit of the painting for contextualisation.

Contrarily to triumphalist portrayals of Dom Pedro in the independence process, such as Independência ou Morte by Pedro Américo, the painting by Bracet explores the emperor's intimacy, having him play a domestic and even feminine role.

== History ==
The painting was first shown publicly at the Exposition of Contemporary Art and Retrospective Art of the Independence Centenary, which began on November 12, 1922. The painting was selected in 1923, together with artworks by Georgina de Albuquerque, Helios Seelinger and Pedro Bruno, to be bought by the state art collection. The goal of this fine art event was acquiring artworks that alluded to the national formation of Brazil. The selection was done by Flexa Ribeiro, Archimedes Memória, and Rodolfo Chambelland, with their task being searching for new iconographic portrayals of historical interpretations of independence.

It is currently on display at the National Historical Museum.
