= Independence or Death =

Painting by Pedro Américo

- Cry of Ipiranga
- Artist: Pedro Américo
- Year: 1888
- Medium: oil paint
- Dimensions: 415 cm (163 in) × 760 cm (300 in)
- Location: Museu do Ipiranga, São Paulo, Brazil

The 1888 painting Independence or Death (Independência ou Morte in Portuguese), also known as the Cry of Ipiranga (Grito do Ipiranga in the original) is an oil on canvas painting by Pedro Américo, from 1888. It is the best known artwork representing the proclamation of the Brazilian independence.

== Author ==
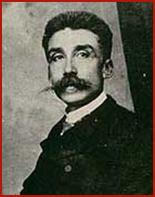
Photo of Pedro Américo (date and photographer unknown).

Pedro Américo was born in 1843, in the Paraíba Province of Brazil, more specifically in the now municipality of Areia, at the time the small town of Brejo d'Areia. Since his youth, he showed a vocation for painting, being 10 years old when he participated as a drawer of flora and fauna in a scientific expedition through Northeastern Brazil led by the French naturalist Louis Jacques Brunet. At approximately 13 years old, he entered the Imperial Academy of Fine Arts, in the city of Rio de Janeiro. His performance at the academy made him known even to Emperor Pedro II, who sponsored a trip to Paris and studies at the École nationale supérieure des Beaux-Arts, where the artist perfected his style, mainly in historical painting. His most famous work, Independence or Death (Portuguese: Independência ou Morte), was shown for the first time in the Accademia di Belle Arti di Firenze (Academy of Fine Arts of Florence) on April 8, 1888. After going to Brazil, remaining there for a few years, he returned to Florence, where he died in 1905.

== Context ==
=== Pre-execution agreements ===
Contrarily to what is speculated, Pedro Américo was not invited to execute the painting dedicated to the independence: the artist himself offered to do it. In 1885, according to records made by imperial adviser Joaquim Inácio Ramalho, Américo declared to the commission of works, that he would charge himself with making a historical painting in memory of the glorious act of Prince Regent Pedro, proclaiming the Brazilian independence. Américo's proposal was not immediately accepted, due to a lack of funds and the architecture of the building that would in the future become the Museu Paulista. In December of the same year, the newspaper A Província de São Paulo published an article criticising the government's behaviour, accusing it of giving false hopes to the artist, considered at the time a master of aesthetics.

It is thought that the media's provocations caused the panel in charge of approving or rejecting Américo's request to change its mind. Towards the end of December 1885, Pedro Américo receives a letter from Ramalho accepting his offer.

In a contract signed on July 14, 1886, between Pedro Américo e Ramalho, at the time president of the Commission of the Monument to the Independence of Brazil, the artist committed himself to painting, accordingly to the description of the documents, a "commemorative historical painting of the proclamation of independence by prince regent D. Pedro in the fields of Ypiranga" (Portuguese: "quadro histórico comemorativo da proclamação da independência pelo príncipe regente D. Pedro nos campos do Ypiranga"). The deadline for the painting of the work would be three years, and Américo would be paid thirty contos de réis, in addition to the six contos that the artist received when he signed the contract, money destined to the first studies and preparatory activities for the work. Entirely painted in Florence, it was finished a year before due, in 1888.

== History ==
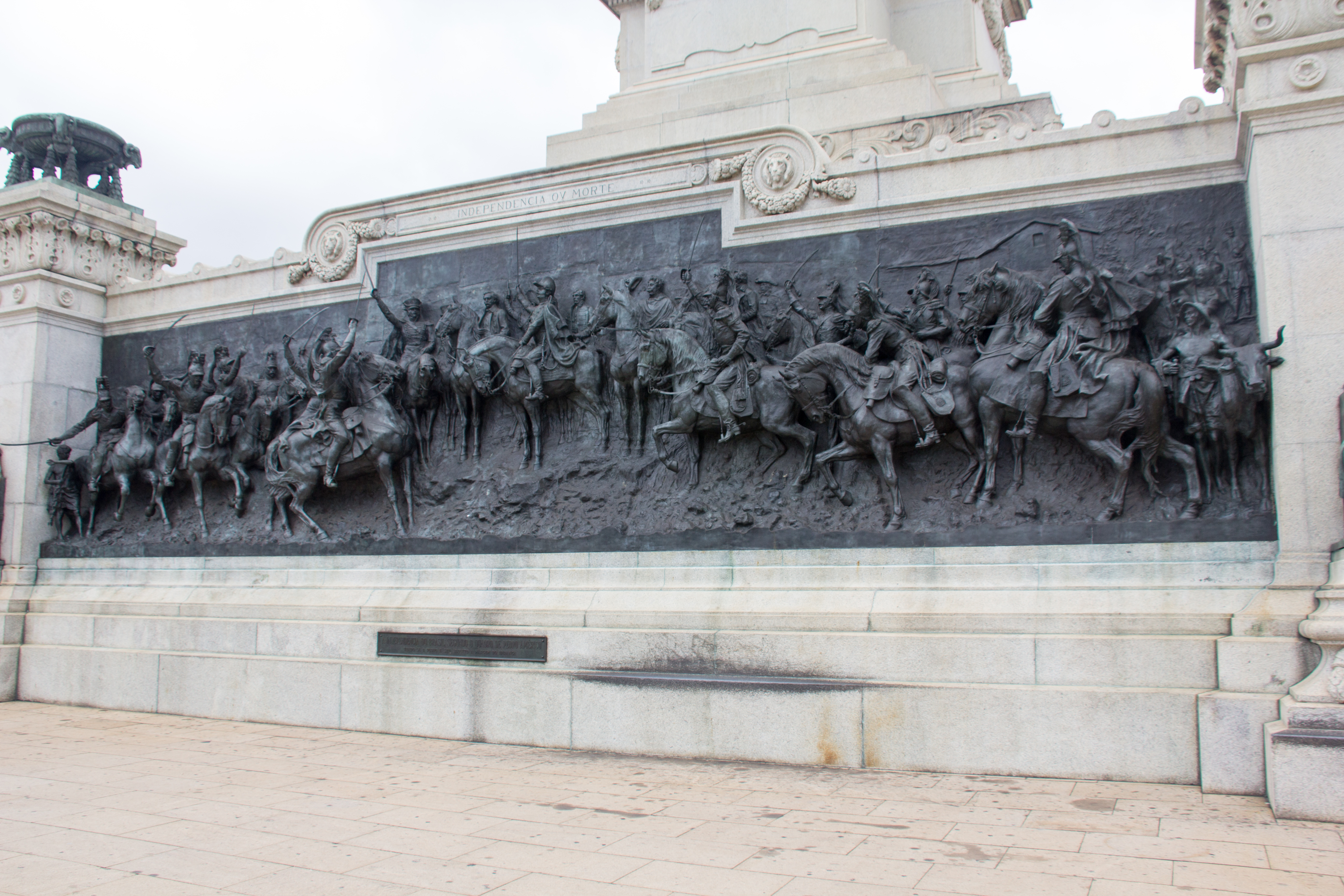
Representation of the painting on the Monument to the Independence of Brazil.

Américo finished the painting in 1888 in Florence, Italy, 66 years after the proclamation of independence. The Brazilian imperial house commissioned the work, due to investments into the construction of the Museu do Ipiranga (presently the Museu Paulista). The goal of the artwork was to emphasize the monarchy.

=== Controversy ===
There exists evidence that the painting is not an accurate description of the events on the shores of the Ipiranga Brook.

== Plagiarism accusation ==
=== Pedro Américo as a copier ===
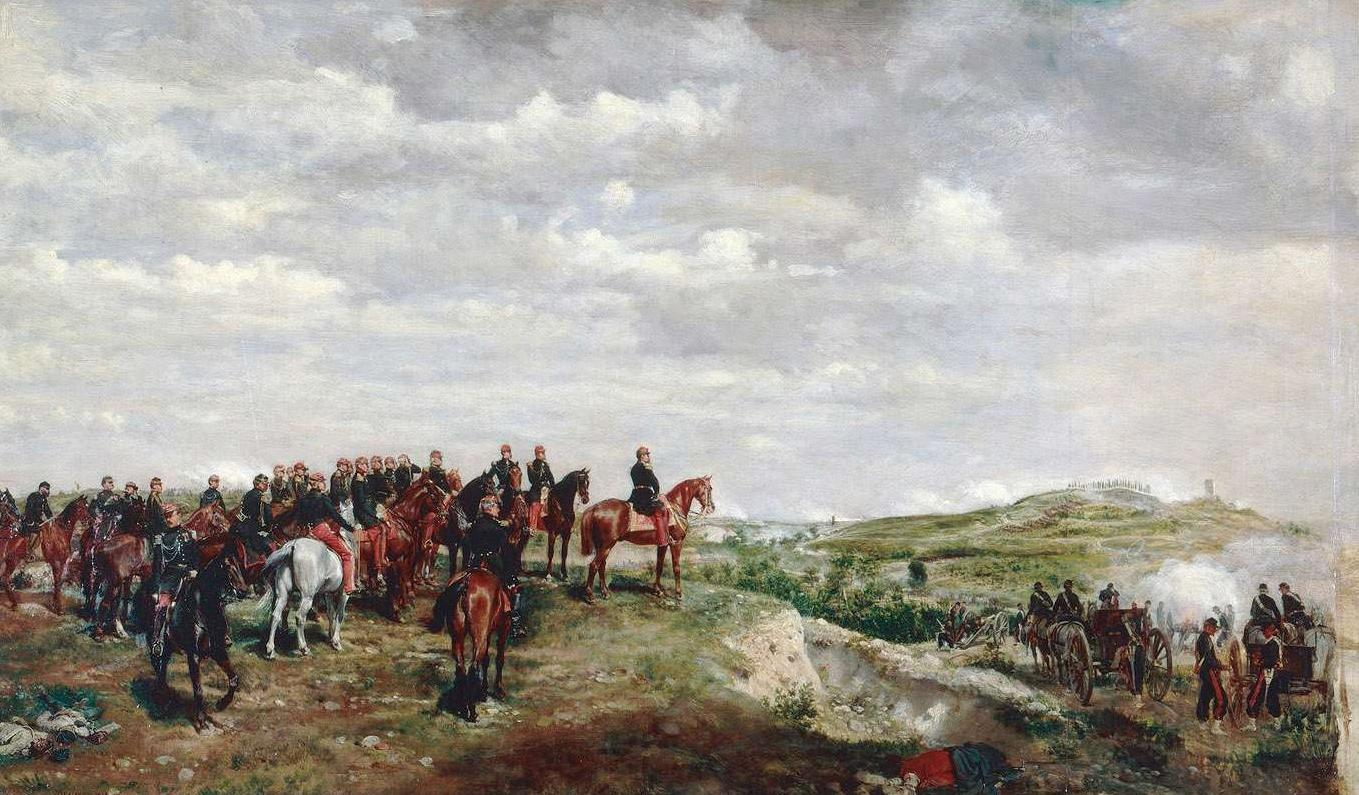
Napoleon III at the Battle of Solferino by Jean-Louis-Ernest Meissonier, 1863 painting that inspired Independência ou Morte.

The painting by Pedro Américo can be compared with other works made by different artists. That resulted in plagiarism accusations to the painter. In his work, Américo creates a dialogue between art history and the traditional battle paintings that emphasised the hero (previously made by his teachers). The process of making the painting was complex. The dialogue with historical paintings was well regarded by the Imperial Academy of Fine Arts, in addition to being a technique used by many artists, without being considered a copy. He intended to develop an image that reminded of those works from the past accordingly to the techniques that were used by those artists.

The experience he had 10 years earlier, with his work Batalha do Avaí, that was not well received by critics, classifying it as "anti-academical" (Portuguese: antiacadêmica), made him study in more depth aesthetic topics and publish the literary work Discurso Sobre o Plágio na Literatura e na Arte (Discourse On Plagiarism in Literature and Art) in 1879, years before beginning Independência ou Morte.

The works by French painters Jean-Louis Ernest Meissonier and Horace Vernet were used as sources for Independência ou Morte. Américo studied the works Napoleon III at the Battle of Solferino (1863) and 1807, Friedland (c. 1870), both by Meissonier and also Bataille de Friedland, 14 juin 1807 (c. 1850), by Vernet. There are similarities between the paintings: the confrontation between D. Pedro and the soldiers to the right has composition similar to the structure of 1807, Friedland: the concentration of people in both paintings is similar; the elevation of D. Pedro to a higher point in the topography approaches the work of Américo to those of Meissonier. In addition, it can be deduced that Américo wished to portray D. Pedro as a statesman, as can be noticed when analysing the figure of Napoleon in the work of Meissonier.

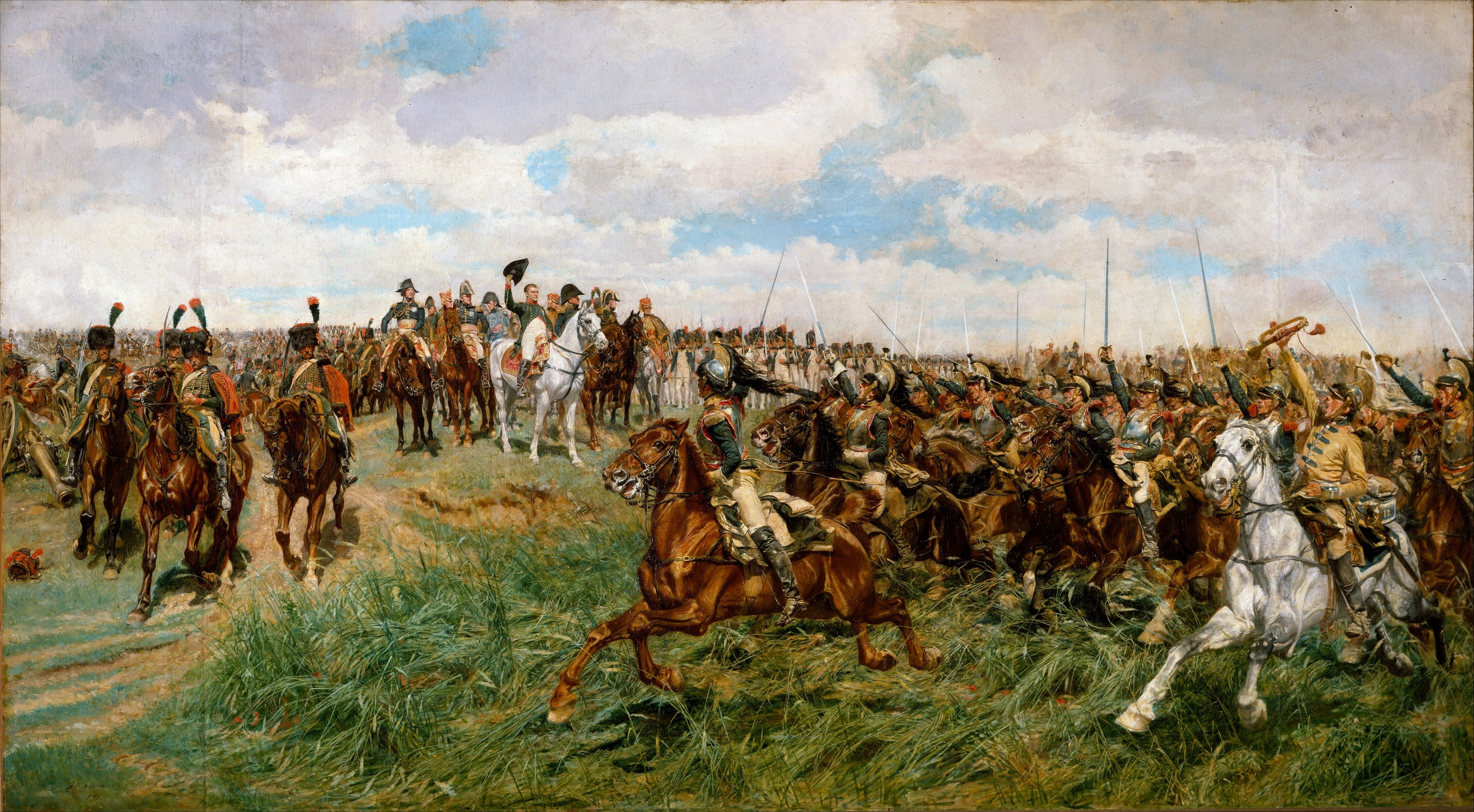
1807, Friedland (c. 1861-1875), another painting by Meissonier that inspired Independência ou Morte.

The historian Lilia Moritz Schwarcz quotes in his book Batalha do Avaí – A Beleza da Barbárie (Battle of Avaí - The Beauty of Barbarism), that the critics of the work by Pedro Américo saw in both A Batalha do Avaí, as in Independência ou Morte, two "brazen" (Portuguese: "descarados") cases of plagiarism of the painters Andrea Appiani and Ernest Meissonier, respectively. According to the historian, the critics saw in Independência ou Morte, a whole scene copy of 1807, Friedland, painted thirteen years earlier by Meissonier, "in which he also portrays Napoleon, a polyvalent figure that serves as a model for Américo to paint both Caxias and D. Pedro I, this one giving the cry of independence at the bank of the Ipiranga" (Portuguese: "em que este também retrata Napoleão, figura polivalente que tanto serve de modelo para Américo pintar Caxias como D. Pedro I, este dando o grito de independência às margens do Ipiranga.").

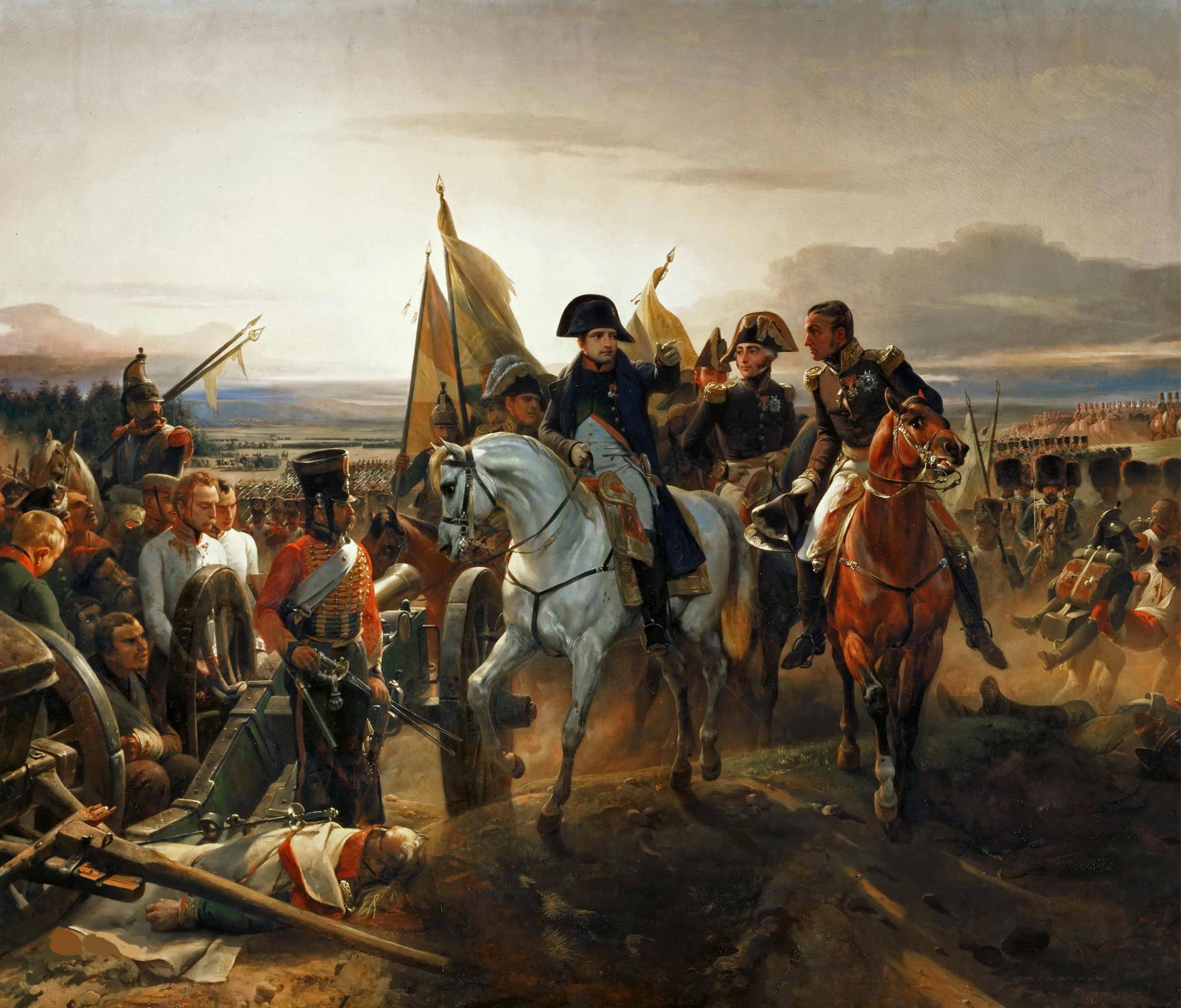
The Battle of Friedland, an 1835 painting by Horace Vernet that inspired Independência ou Morte.

According to the art historian Maraliz de Castro, the work by Américo has major differences from the paintings by Meissonier, saying the Brazilian concerns himself with every detail, searching for a balance between all the elements, with the goal of creating a significant impression of unity, while in Napoleon III at the Battle of Solferino, the Frenchman wished to simulate an instantaneous photography of reality differently from the carefully organised figures in Independência ou Morte. According to Maraliz, another difference is the movement in the painting by Meissonier: the soldiers run frenetically in direction to the viewer; however Américo composes a form in ellipsis to make up all the characters of the scene, uniting them to the use of perspective. In the other hand, according to the art historian Cláudia Valladão, these details reaffirm the traditional values of Américo, as however he agreed with the group of theoreticians at the time called "idealists", his artistic position was directed at a dialogue with the "realist" tendencies of historical painting, as used by a variety of artists at the time, for example Meissonier. There was also a contemporary accusation of plagiarism published in 1982 by the journalist Elio Gaspari, in his column in the magazine Veja, also refuted by Cláudia Valladão, that comments on the publication: "accusing Pedro Américo of plagiarism is not understand the assumptions of his art" (Portuguese: "acusá-lo [Pedro Américo] de plágio é não compreender os pressupostos de sua arte").

=== Inspiration pictures ===
Pedro Américo used some historical paintings as references to compose the artwork Independência ou Morte.

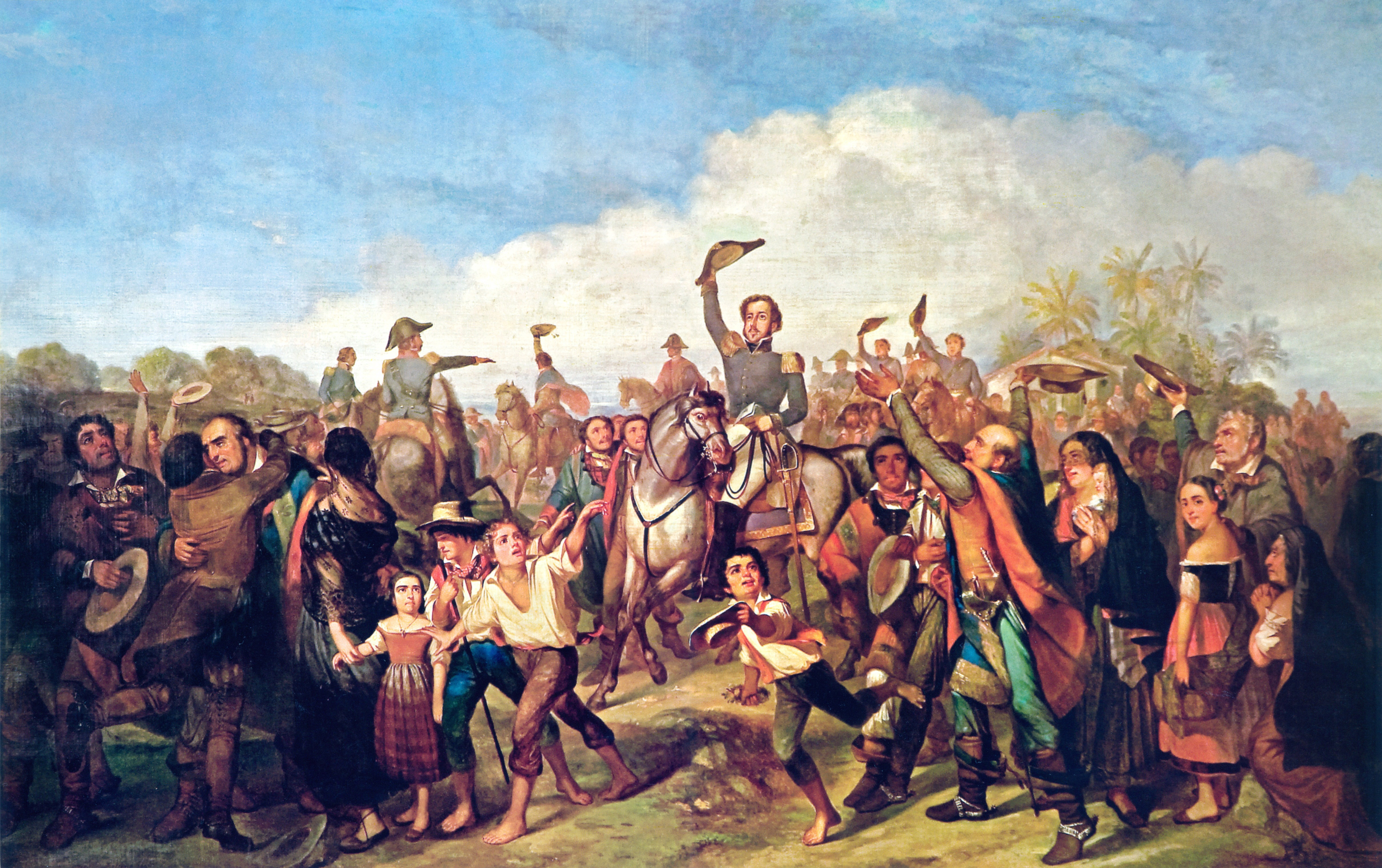
A Proclamação da Independência, by François-René Moreau, 1844

Comparing Américo's painting with A Proclamação da Independência by François-René Moreaux, one realizes that the latter includes many more civilians than the Brazilian in his artwork. The characters in Moreaux's painting look at the sky. Consequently, the emperor is portrayed as a figure fulfilling a divine will by proclaiming independence, not as someone with leadership and political abilities, as done by Américo.

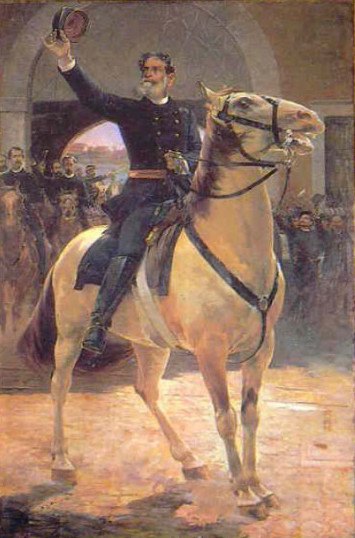
Retrato de Deodoro da Fonseca, by Henrique Bernardelli, also portrays a proclamation in an idealized manner.

In contrast, the works Independência ou Morte and Retrato de Deodoro da Fonseca from the painter Henrique Bernardelli (which represents the officer declaring the end of the monarchy and the beginning of the republic in Brazil) complete one another: both complied to the interests of the 1889 republic and reaffirmed that historical changes in Brazil were marked by heroes and grandiose events. They illustrate independence and are effective in its propaganda, even if they don't question the new Brazilian autonomy with veracity.

Furthermore, Bernardelli's painting portrays the event in an epic and idealized manner, as in Pedro Américo's artwork. Deodoro, in reality, was sick and constantly bed-ridden, with a chronic lack of air caused by Arteriosclerosis. Accordingly, to reports by the lawyer Francisco Glicério, who participated in the Proclamation of the Republic, the marshal barely had enough strength to put on his uniform. Unlike what is shown in the painting, he was weak and staggering, not being able to stay on top of his horse.

== Legacy ==
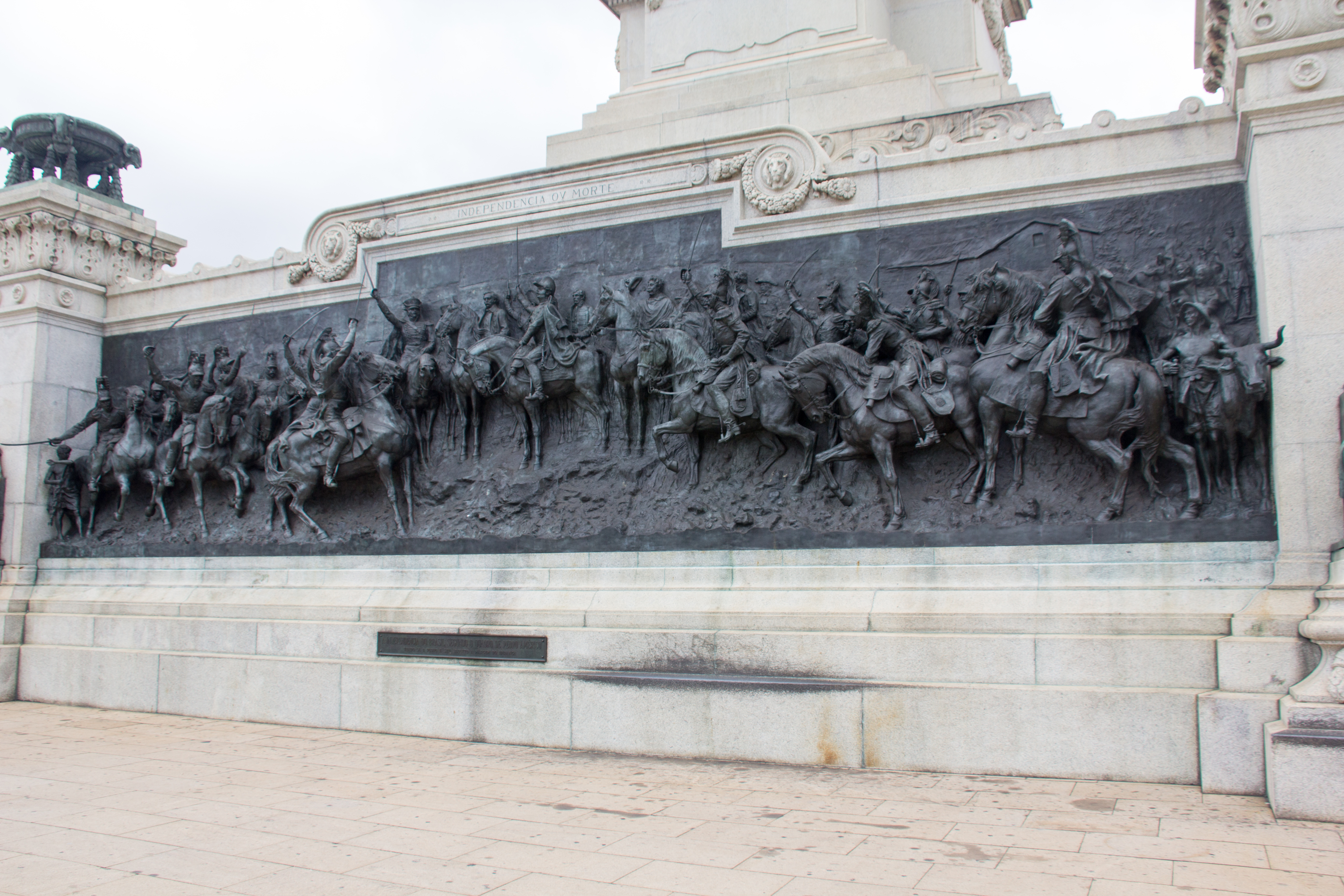
Pediment of the Monument of Independence.

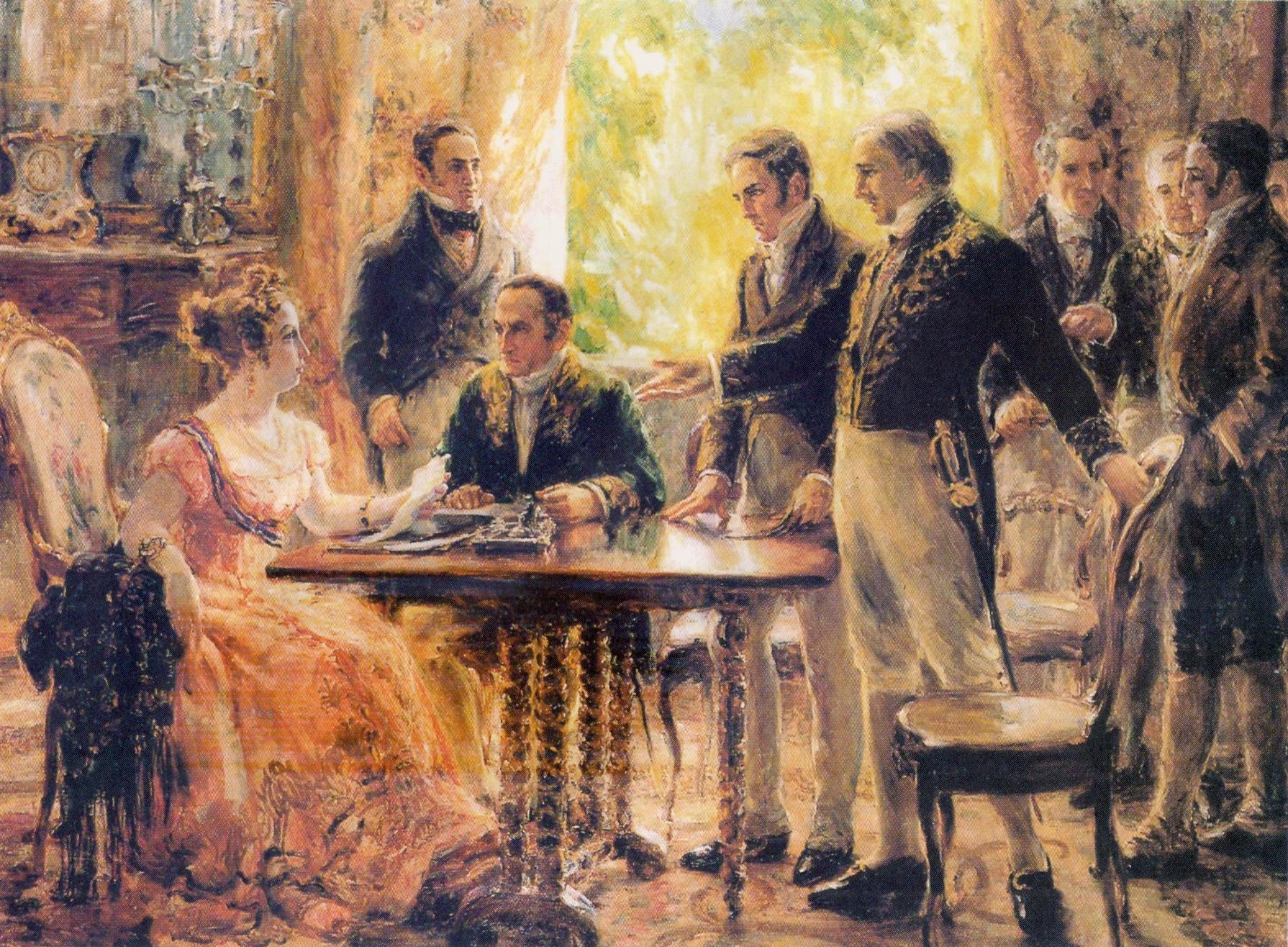
Sessão do Conselho de Estado (Session of the State Council), by Georgina de Albuquerque.

Detail of the gigapixel version by Google Arts & Culture

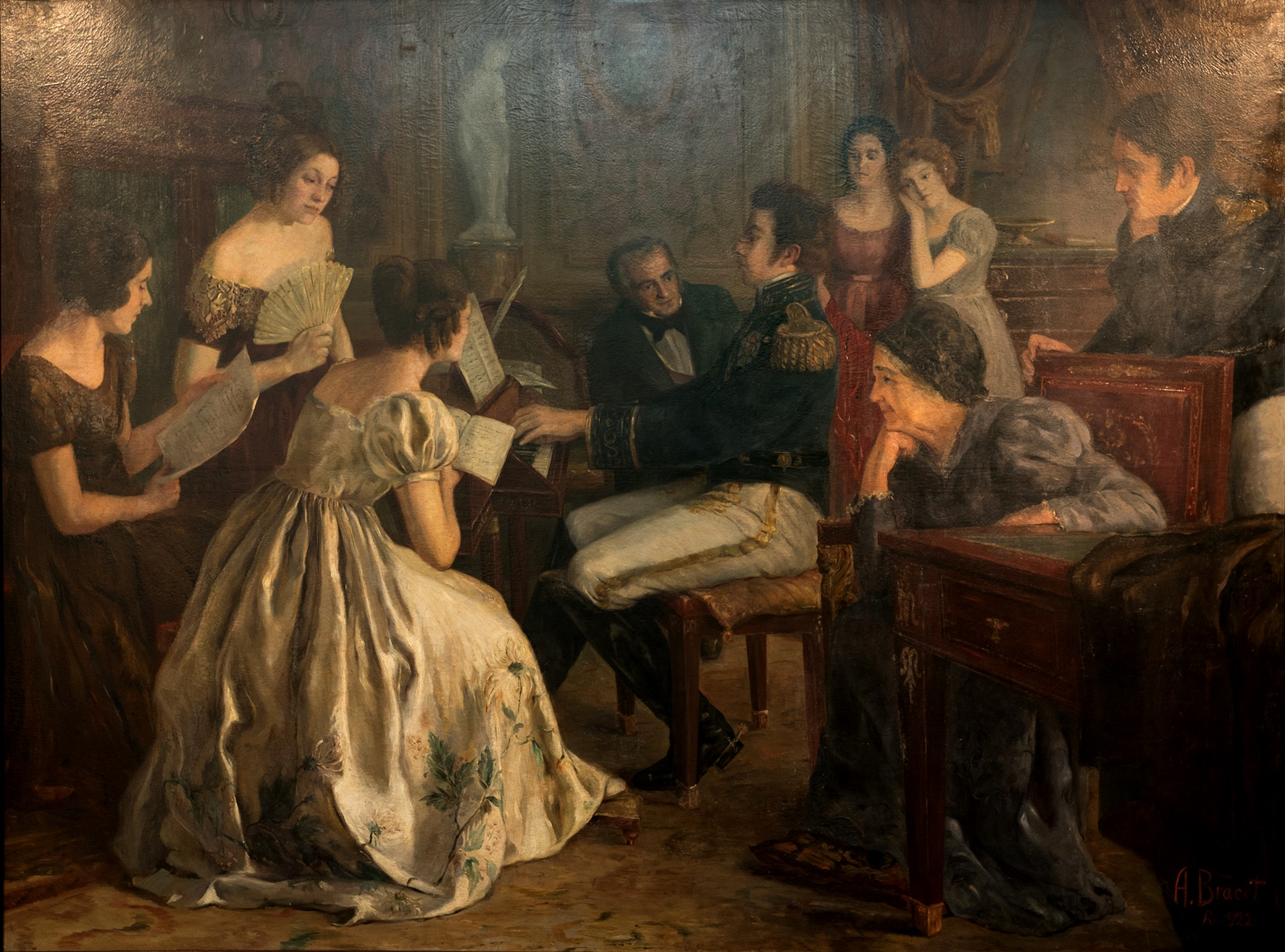
Primeiros Sons do Hino Nacional (First hearing of Independence Anthem) by Augusto Bracet, depicting Dom Pedro I composing the Independence Anthem

=== Diffusion in didactic books, monuments and digital media ===
The painting by Pedro Américo appears constantly in Brazilian didactic books, therefore becoming a "canonical image" (Portuguese: "imagem canônica") in the teaching of history in Brazil. A study with children has shown that in part due to the influence of the illustrations in didactic books, they represented the act of independence inspired by the graphical reference of Independência ou Morte. In the books, the painting is used to illustrate the act of founding the Brazilian nationality, showing that the transition to independence is the result of a cry. That common interpretation, represents the cry of Ipiranga as a direction, in a personalised act and centralised in the monarch.

The importance of the work by Pedro Américo, the official portrayal of independence, resulted in it influencing other works, among which the pediment of the Monument to the Independence of Brazil, which emulates the work of Américo.

The painting by Pedro Américo is part of the collection available in the project Google Arts & Culture. The work was digitalised as a gigapixel image with Google's Art Camera, to record details in the work that are imperceptible to the naked eye. Independência ou Morte is the largest painting to be digitalised by Google in Brazil.

=== Influence on painting ===
The work by Pedro Américo became the reference, sometimes to be deconstructed, of the portrayal of Brazilian Independence. Creating an alternate version to that of the heroism and triumphalism of Dom Pedro, portrayed by Américo, set the tone, for example, for the production of highlighted works in expositions celebrating the Independence Centenary, as Sessão do Conselho de Estado (Session of the State Council), by Georgina de Albuquerque, and Primeiros Sons do Hino Nacional (First hearing of Independence Anthem), by Augusto Bracet. In the painting by Albuquerque, the protagonist of the declaration of independence becomes Maria Leopoldina, in a scene where she is shown deliberating with the Council of the Attorneys-general of the Provinces of Brazil the direction to Dom Pedro to end the colonisation of Brazil by Portugal; in the painting by Bracet, Dom Pedro appears as the protagonist of the separation from Portugal, but in a domestic setting and in a jovial attitude, composing the Hino da Independência (Independence Anthem).
