= 1807, Friedland =

Painting by Ernest Meissonier

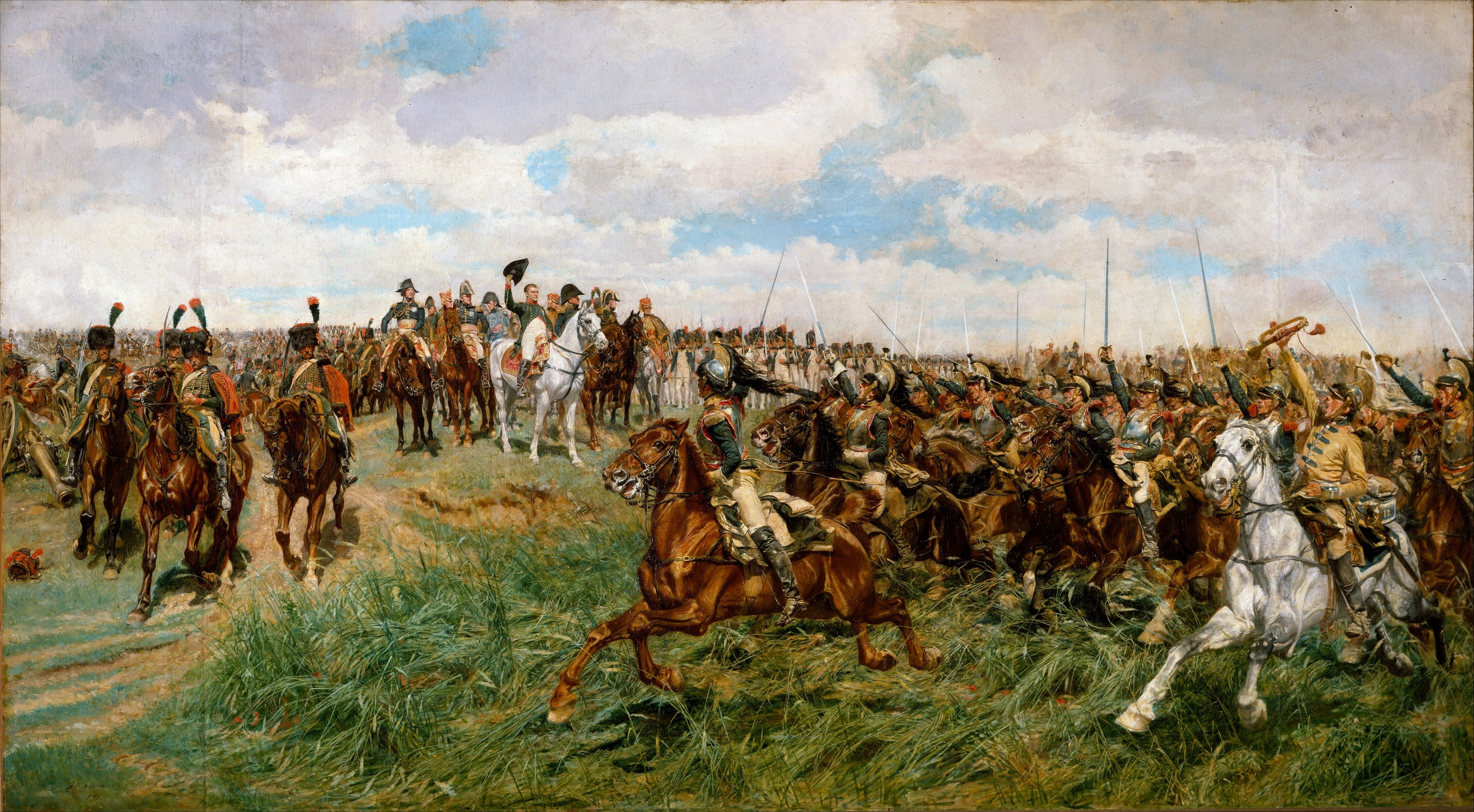
- Artist: Ernest Meissonier
- Year: c. 1861-1875
- Medium: Oil on canvas
- Dimensions: 135.9 cm × 242.6 cm (53.5 in × 95.5 in)
- Location: Metropolitan Museum of Art, New York

1807, Friedland is an oil on canvas painting by the French painter Ernest Meissonier, created in c. 1861–1875. It is held in the Metropolitan Museum of Art, in New York.

== History and description ==
Meissonier's largest and most ambitious painting depicts one of the greatest victories of Napoleon, which he won over the Russian troops in the Battle of Friedland, on June 14, 1807, during the War of the Fourth Coalition. Napoleon is shown on a white horse with a raised bicorn in his right hand, accompanied by several of his officers, identified as Louis-Alexandre Berthier, Jean-Baptiste Bessières, Géraud Duroc and Étienne Marie Antoine Champion de Nansouty, while inspecting the triumphant cuirassiers.

Meissonier worked on the painting for fourteen years, from 1861 to 1875. He started by painting the sky and made separate studies for each horse and man, using, among others, wax models. The one used to paint the hussar visible in the front, on the left side of the painting, has survived. The finished work caused a sensation and was widely praised, although there were also many voices of criticism. Among his critics were American novelist Henry James and the painter Édouard Manet, who stated, jokingly, that in the painting "everything looks like it's made of steel... except the cuirasses." The critic Henry Houssaye noted that the painting was fictional, since Napoleon did not review his troops at Friedland.

== Controversy ==
Brazilian painting Independence or Death (1888), by Pedro Américo, which depicts the Brazilian declaration of independence by Pedro I of Brazil, is very similar to Meissonier's work, to the point it has been claimed to have been plagiarized by the Brazilian painter.
