= Evaristo da Veiga =

Brazilian poet, journalist, politician and bookseller

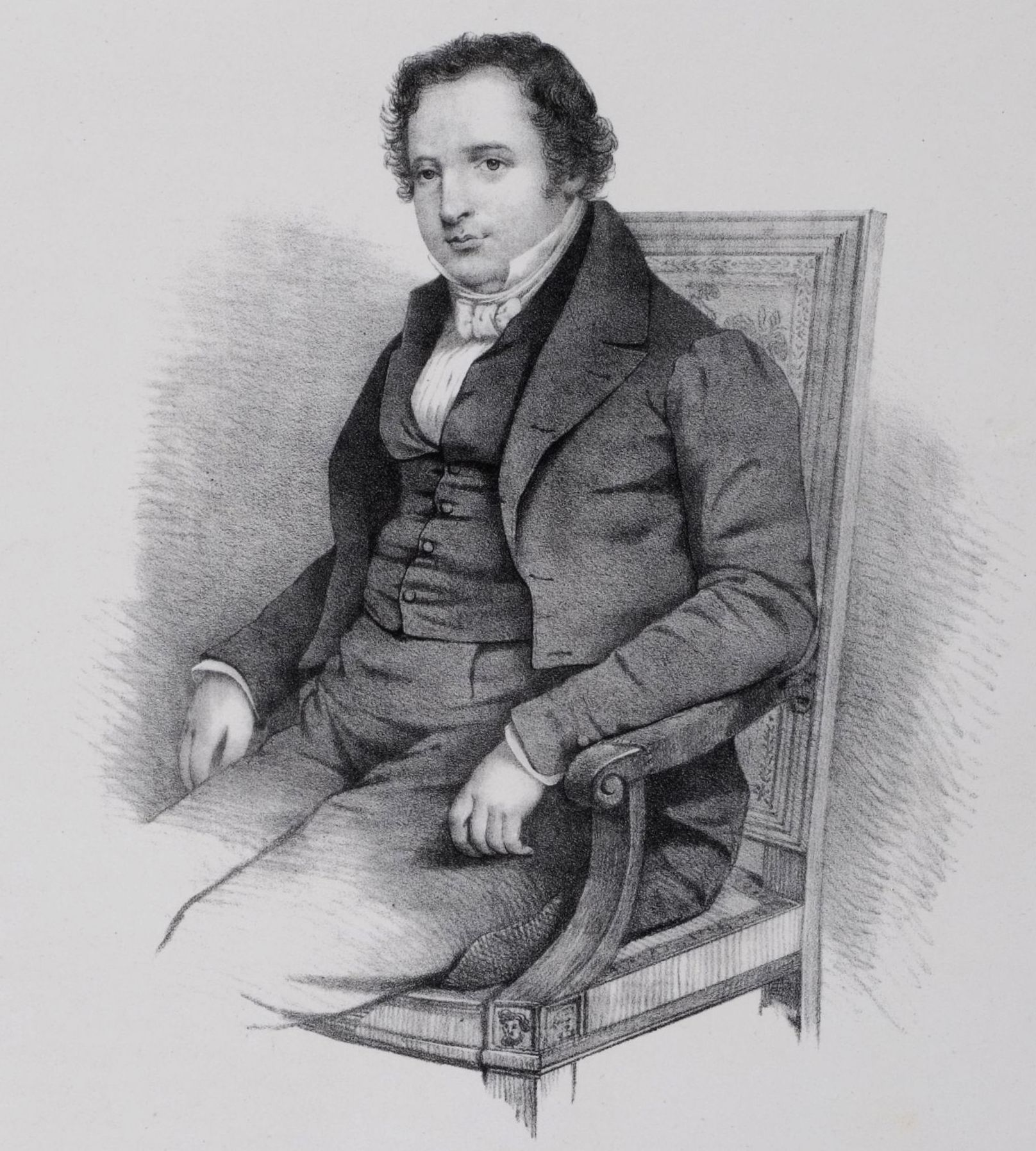
- Born: Evaristo Ferreira da Veiga e Barros; 8 October 1799; Rio de Janeiro
- Died: 12 May 1837 (aged 37); Rio de Janeiro
- Occupations: Journalist, poet, politician

Evaristo Ferreira da Veiga e Barros (8 October 1799 – 12 May 1837) was a Brazilian poet, journalist, politician, and bookseller. Veiga founded one of the first Brazilian newspapers, A Aurora Fluminense, in 1827, during the reign of Emperor Pedro I. He was also deputy and senator for Minas Gerais. Veiga composed poems, including the lyrics for the Hino da Independência and is the patron of the tenth seat of the Brazilian Academy of Letters.
