= Augusto Bracet =

Brazilian painter, drawer and professor (1881–1960)

- Born: August 14, 1881; Rio de Janeiro
- Died: 24 August 1960 (aged 79); Rio de Janeiro
- Known for: Painter, decorator and professor

Augusto Bracet (14 August 1881 in Rio de Janeiro – 1960 in Rio de Janeiro) was a Brazilian painter, drawer and professor.

== Biography ==
Graduated from the Escola Nacional de Belas Artes (ENBA). Was a pupil of the painters Zeferino da Costa, Daniel Bérard, Rodolpho Amoêdo, and Baptista da Costa.

Bracet dedicated himself to landscapes, the human figure and occasionally to historical themes.

In 1911, he won the Foreign Travel Prize and moved to Italy and France, studying with Morelli and Louis Billoul.

He returned to Brazil in 1914, and in 1926 was made acting professor of painting in the Escola Nacional de Belas Artes and became a permanent professor the next year.

Was acting director of the School between 1938 and 1945 and permanent director from 1945 to 1948.

== Main works ==
- A traição de Judas (The treason of Judas)
- Lindóia
- Primeiros Sons do Hino Nacional (First hearing of Independence Anthem)

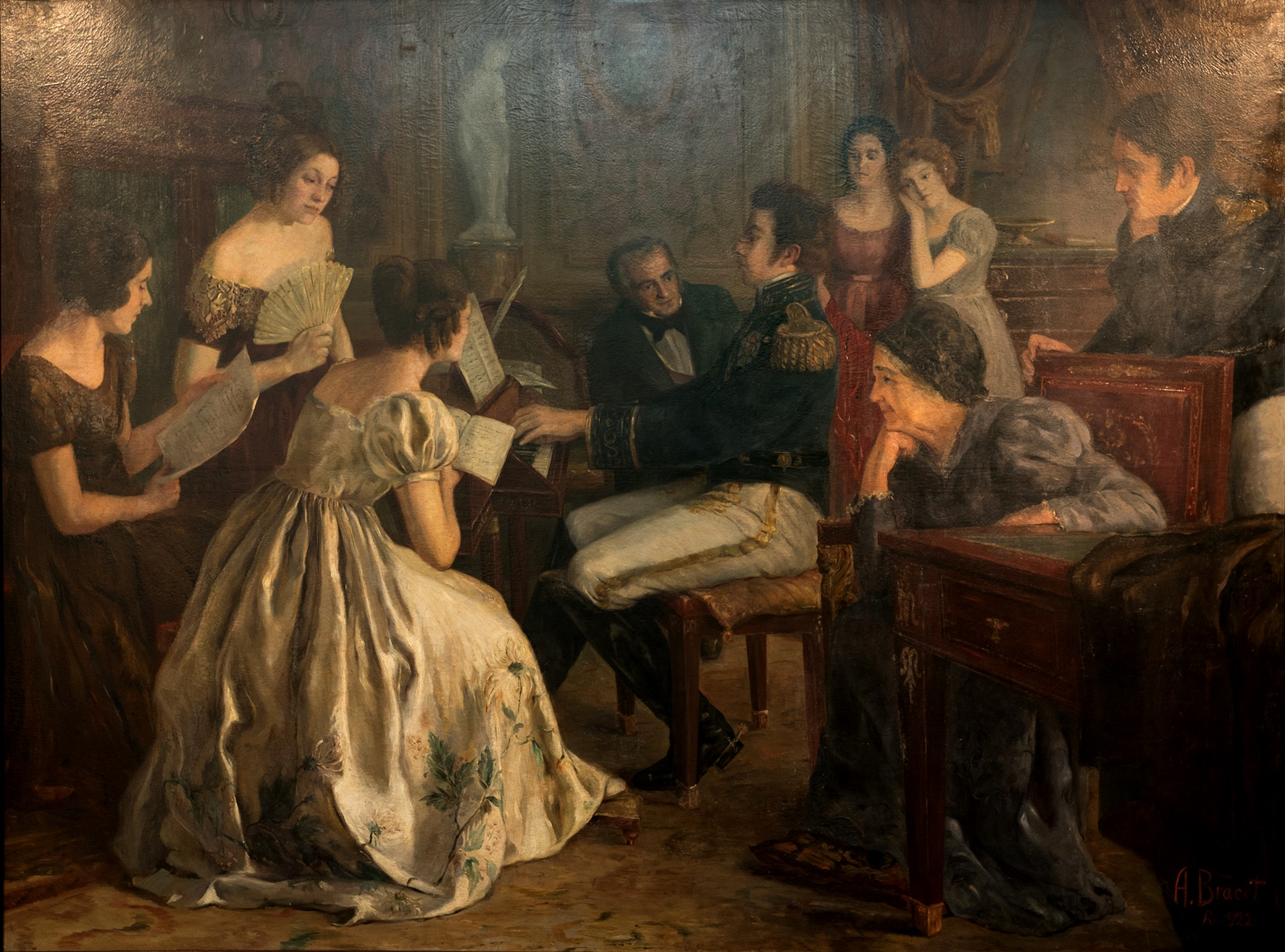
Primeiros Sons do Hino Nacional (First hearing of Independence Anthem)
