= Minister of Economy and Planning (Angola) =

Minister of Economy and Planning of Angola is a cabinet level position in the national government. The position was established in 1975 with Henrique Teles Carreira.

== Name changes ==
- 1975–1978: Minister of Economy
- 1978–1995: Minister of Economy and Finance
- 2009–2016: Minister of Economy
- 1975–1992: Minister of Planning (Ministro do Plano)
- 1994–1997: Minister of Planning (Ministro do Planeamento)
- 2012–2013: Minister of Planning and Territory Development
- 2017–present: Minister of Economy and Planning

== Ministers of Economy and Finance ==
- 1995–1996: Augusto da Silva Tomás
- 1996–1999: Mário de Alcântara Monteiro

== Ministers of Economy ==
- 2004–2010: Manuel Nunes Júnior
- 2010–2017: Abraão Gourgel

== Ministers of Planning (Ministros do Plano) ==
- 1975–1978: Carlos Alberto Rocha Oliveira Dilolwa
- 1978–1979: José Eduardo dos Santos
- 1979–1981: Roberto António Victor Francisco de Almeida
- 1981–1986: Lopo Fortunato Ferreira do Nascimento
- 1986–1990: António Henriques da Silva
- 1990–1991: Fernando José de França Dias Van-Dúnem
- 1991–1992: Emanuel Moreira Carneiro

== Ministers of Planning (Ministros do Planeamento) ==
- 1994–1996: José Pedro de Morais
- 1996–1997: Emanuel Moreira Carneiro
- 1999–2012: Ana Afonso Dias Lourenço

== Minister of Planning and Territory Development ==
- 2012–2013: Job Graça

== Minister of Economy and Planning ==
- 2017–present: Pedro Luís da Fonseca
