= Nikola Filchev =

Bulgarian jurist

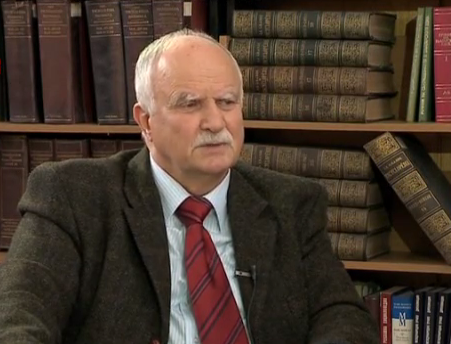

Personal details
- Born: 25 July 1948 (age 78) Varna, Bulgaria
- Profession: Jurist

Nikola Filchev Borisov (Bulgarian: Никола Филчев Борисов; born 25 July 1948) is a Bulgarian jurist who served as the chief prosecutor of Bulgaria from 1999 to 2006. Between 2006 and 2008, he was the Bulgarian ambassador to Kazakhstan. In 1986, Filchev earned a doctorate in law.

== Biography ==
Nikola Filchev was born on 25 July 1948 in Varna, Bulgaria. He graduated in Law (LLM) from St. Kliment Ohridski University of Sofia. In 1973 he was appointed judge at Varna District Court. In 1977 he joined the Institute for Legal Studies at The Bulgarian Academy of Sciences as a research associate. He lectured at the Law Faculty of Sofia University while serving as a judge in Sofia. In 1986 he defended his PhD thesis on complicity in crime. In 1999 he became Associate Professor of criminal law. In 1991 the Grand National Assembly elected Mr. Filchev judge at the Supreme Court of Cassation of the Republic of Bulgaria (the Criminal Collage). Between 1997 and 1999 he served as Deputy Minister of Justice. He was the Prosecutor General of the Republic of Bulgaria from 1999 to 2006. In 2005 he was conferred the title Professor of criminal law. Between 2006 and 2008, he served as the Bulgarian ambassador to Kazakhstan. Since 1996 he has been Head of the Chair of Criminal law Studies at the Law Faculty of the University of National and World Economy in Sofia, Bulgaria.

Nikola Filchev has specialized in criminal law in Russia and Germany. He has participated in a number of international fora. He is the author of numerous publications (monographs, studies, articles, etc.) in Bulgarian, Russian, English and German on the teaching of crime (corpus delicti, culpa, method of committing a crime) and penal lawmaking (public danger, criminalization of acts, differentiation of criminal liability).
