= Street dogs in Sofia =

Stray animals in Sofia

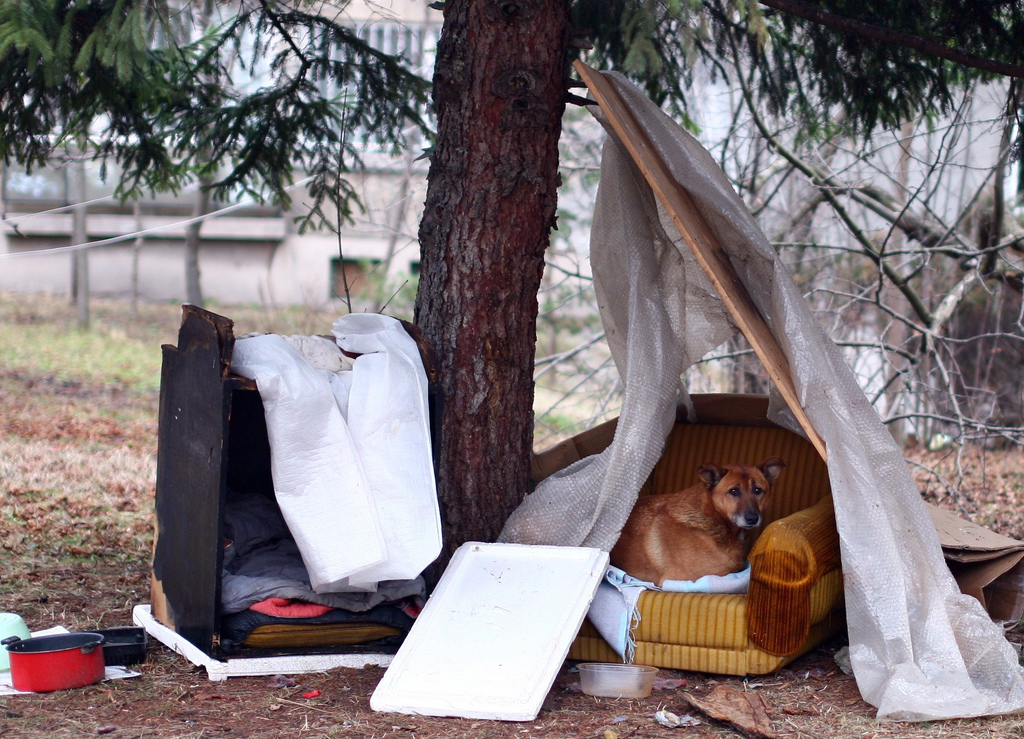

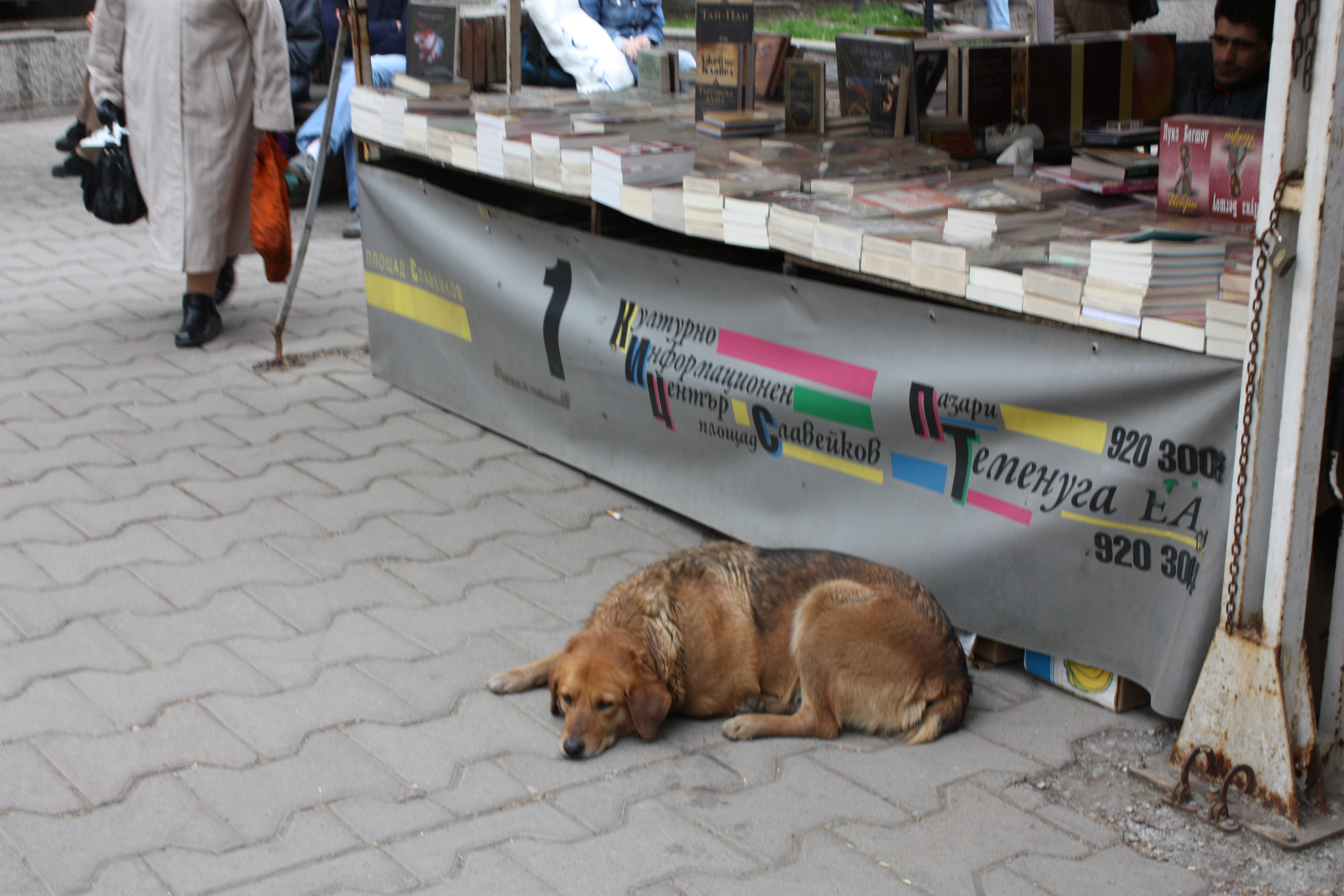

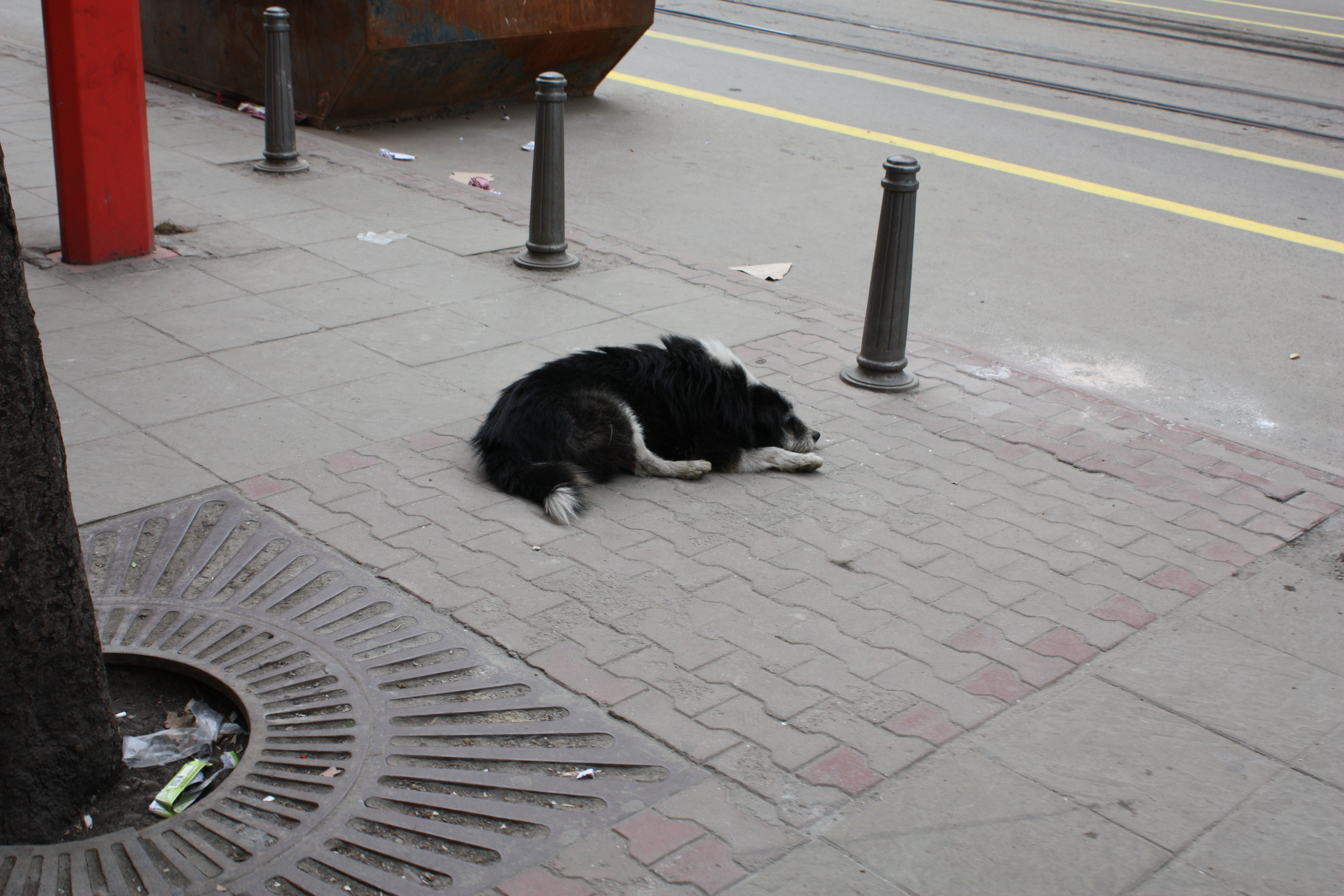

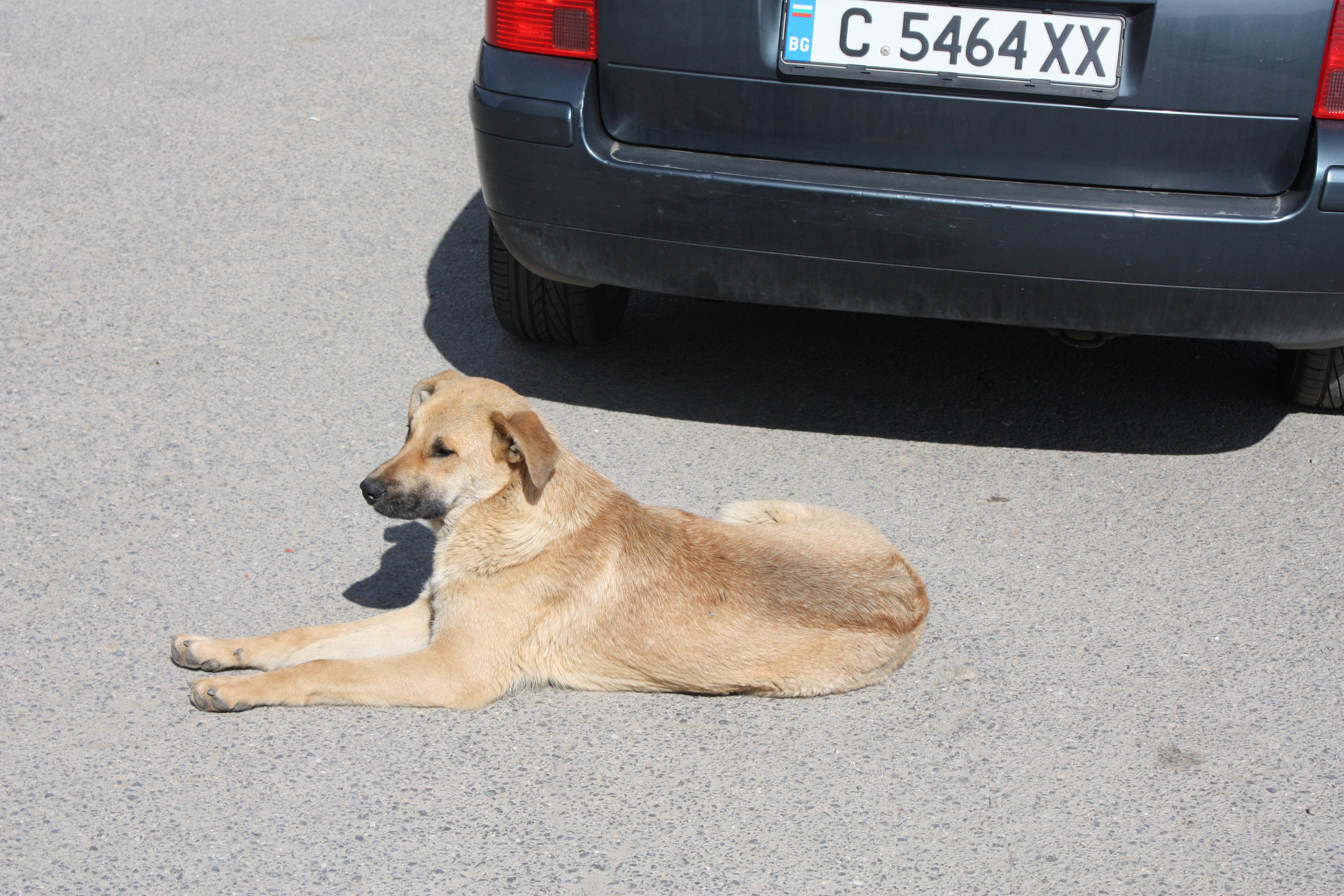

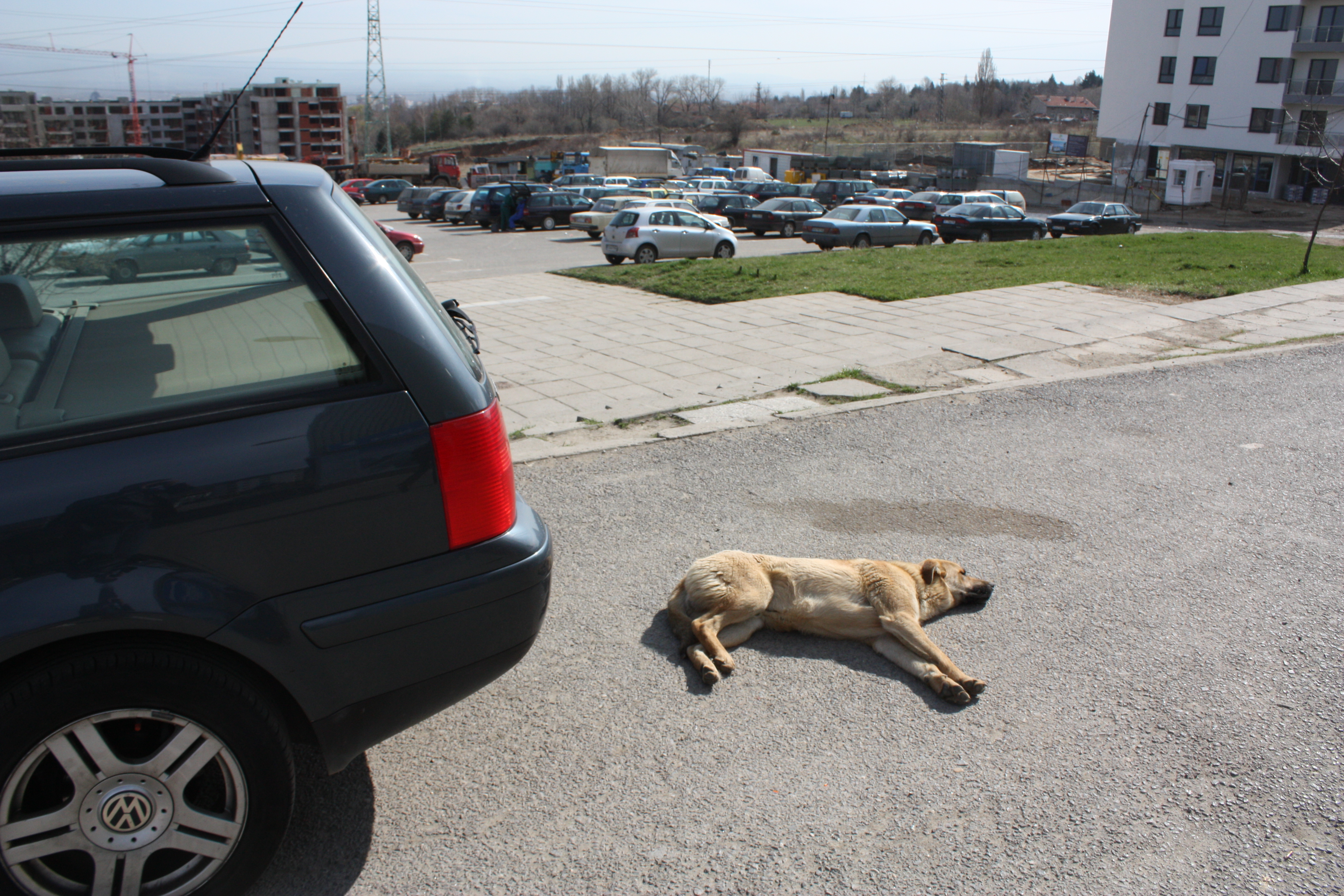

Street dogs (Bulgarian: улични кучета, ˈulichni ˈkucheta) are a notable subpopulation of dogs arising from and existing in Bulgaria's capital Sofia since approximately 1990. There is a large overlap with the local free-ranging dog population. The first publicly available data on street dog population counted 11,124 dogs in mid-2007. After an incident in which a prominent person was killed by a pack of strays in 2012, the municipal government of Sofia proclaimed plans to reduce the stray population by 95% by 2016. Following their mass removal from public spaces, in mid-2018, 3,589 dogs reportedly remained outside.

== Other synonyms ==
The legal term is unowned dogs (безстопанствени кучета, bezstoˈpanstveni ˈkucheta). Colloquially, they are also called roaming dogs (бездомни кучета, bezˈdomni ˈkucheta) or homeless dogs (скитащи кучета, ˈskitashti ˈkucheta).

== Dog population management ==
Problems with street dogs arose in the early 1990's with a boom in dog ownership, resulting in overpopulation. As early as 2005, colonies and packs of stray dogs ranging from socialized to feral were commonly seen across Sofia. Dog control measures are performed by municipalities, NGOs, and local volunteers. Methods of population control for the street dogs include removal, catch-neuter-release, and re-homing. After the Animal Protection Act passed in 2008, containing provisions for stray animals, the mass culling of dogs was no longer permitted as a method of population control.

These population control methods would prove ineffective. Sofia's animal control chief reported that in 2012, the carcasses of 1,379 stray dogs were collected while only 3,784 were neutered and released. The effectiveness of Bulgarian catch-neuter-release programs is unknown, although this method proved ineffective in Greece.

Those who kill stray dogs may face a maximum of 3 to 5 years imprisonment. However, this law may be unenforced.

== Notable dog attacks ==
In January 2005, Elena Cholova was bitten by pack of dogs in the Studentski grad neighbourhood. She later sued the Sofia municipality for 40,000 leva.

On 4 January 2010, an attack by stray dogs in the Sofia Zoo resulted in the death of eight mouflons, and five fallow deer - four males and one female.

In late March 2012 Botyo Tachkov, a professor at the American College of Sofia and a well-known figure in the city, was attacked and severely injured by a pack of approximately 20 dogs in the Malinova dolina neighbourhood. The dogs bit his left foot and his eyes, making him blind according to the doctors. Though he initially survived the incident, he died in the hospital 10 days later after intensive care and an unsuccessful surgery.

In June 2012, another elderly man died in the hospital after he was found in the Reduta neighbourhood with his legs bitten to the bone.

In 2014, the districts of Studentski grad, Ovcha kupel, Knyazhevo, and Pancharevo had the highest rate of dog attacks.

== Animal control services ==
After the mauling and death of Tachkov, 23 dogs involved in the incident were caught. An investigation classified 4 of the dogs as aggressive and they were euthanized. The other 19 were impounded in the Seslavtsi dog shelter from where they could be adopted.The mayor encouraged adoption of the dogs, but complained that some aggressive adopted dogs are eventually released on the streets by their adopters.

Obscure dog control policies raised some public outrage. After a series of deadly incidents in 2012, Georgi Kadiev, a political rival of then-mayor Yordanka Fandakova, attempted to sue her, but the city court prosecutor rejected his claim.

Because of the incidents in 2012, Fandakova declared the stray population "Sofia's top problem". She also speculated people from other parts of the country were coming to the city to dump their unwanted dogs. The government suggested a more strict euthanasia program for aggressive animals and construction of emergency shelters to remove other strays from the street. Animal rights advocates struck back, accusing authorities of weak control over pet owners who do not register their animals and often abandon them or their litters on the streets, and state that there are corrupt practices when it comes to neutering dogs.

=== Funding ===
In 2008, the city began devoting over a million leva to animal shelter and animal control programs.

=== Record keeping and reporting ===
The city's animal control entity, Ecoravovesie, reports incomplete data on dog intake and release. While the stray population has decreased since 2005, officials claim unrealistic rates of live releases. Between September 2006 and July 2013, a total of 26,118 dogs were reported as neutered and released. Between 2008 and 2010, the number of dogs reported as euthanized or otherwise dead was 2,728. Ecoravovesie claims only to euthanize extremely aggressive dogs involved in biting incidents or those suffering from incurable illnesses.

== Population figures ==
Historical population
Year	Pop.	±%
2007	11,124	—
2009	8,538	−23.2%
2011	9,241	+8.2%
2013	6,635	−28.2%
2015	3,844	−42.1%
2018	3,589	−6.6%
* unowned dogs

In 2011, the highest concentration of strays was around the southern ring of Sofia, where Botyo Tachkov died. In 2014, the highest concentration of street dogs was in Romani neighbourhoods, where 1,000 dogs were neutered.

In 2014, Sofia - with a population of 1.2 million - had a lower ratio of strays to humans compared to other Bulgarian cities. Veliko Tarnovo had a ratio of approximately 2,000 stray dog per 60,000 people.

=== Owned dog population ===
In 2018 the European Pet Food Industry Federation estimated the Bulgarian dog population to be about 740,000 per 7 million people. The registered dog population in Sofia in 2012, however, was only 10,683 registered dogs. In mid-2007, there were approximately 11,124 street dogs in Sofia alone.

=== Rabies cases ===
In 2007–2016, the registered cases of rabid animals of any species in were 7 out of 158 total national cases. A breakdown by species was presented for the national total: 110 foxes, 19 dogs, 15 cats, 10 jackals, and 4 farm animals.

== See also ==
- Street dogs in Bucharest
- Street dogs in Moscow
