= Karl Marx University =

Karl Marx University may refer to:

- The University of Leipzig; between 1953 and 1991 the university was called the Karl Marx University
- Corvinus University of Budapest; between 1953 and 1991 the university was known as the Karl Marx University of Economics
- Karl Marx Higher Institute of Economics, Sophia Bulgaria renamed University of National and World Economy
- A name proposed, but never officially adopted, for the University of Trier
