= EMIS =

EMIS or EMiS can mean:

- Education management information system - a management information system for the education sector
- EMIS Health - a software company serving medical practices in Great Britain
- Empresa Interbancária de Serviços - Interbank network for all electronic payments in Angola
- Environmental management information system - an information technology system used for tracking environmental data for a company
- Emergency management information system - a computer database for disaster response
- European Movement in Scotland - a non-party-political pressure group campaigning for closer association with the European Union
- The 2015-2017 European Parliament committee of inquiry into the Volkswagen emissions scandal
