= Job Graça =

Angolan economist and politician

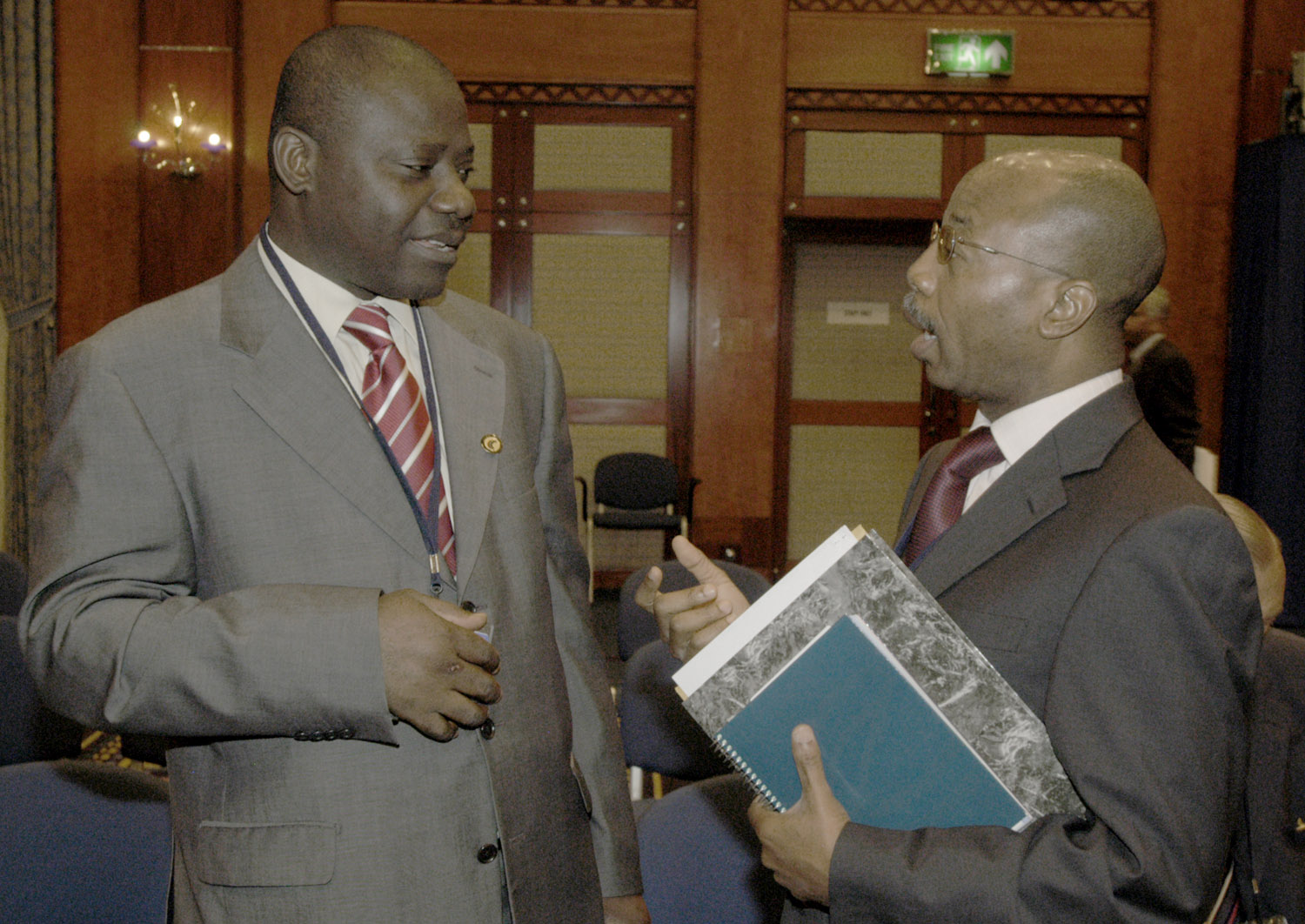
Job Graça (right), speaking with the Deputy Governor of the National Bank of Angola in 2003

Job Graça is an Angolan economist, teacher and politician. He studied economics at the University of Essex in the United Kingdom. He has held various ministerial positions within the Angolan government, passing through Deputy Minister positions in the Ministries of Planning, Economy, Finance, and Transport. He served as Minister of Planning and Territory Development from 2012 to 2013.
