= Studentski grad =

Studentski grad may refer to:

- Studentski grad, Sofia, a student campus area for most universities in Sofia, Bulgaria
- Studentski Grad, Belgrade, an urban neighborhood of Belgrade, Serbia
- Studentski grad, Zagreb, a neighborhood of Gornja Dubrava, Zagreb, Croatia
