= Stati Statev =

Bulgarian scientist, economist and mathematician

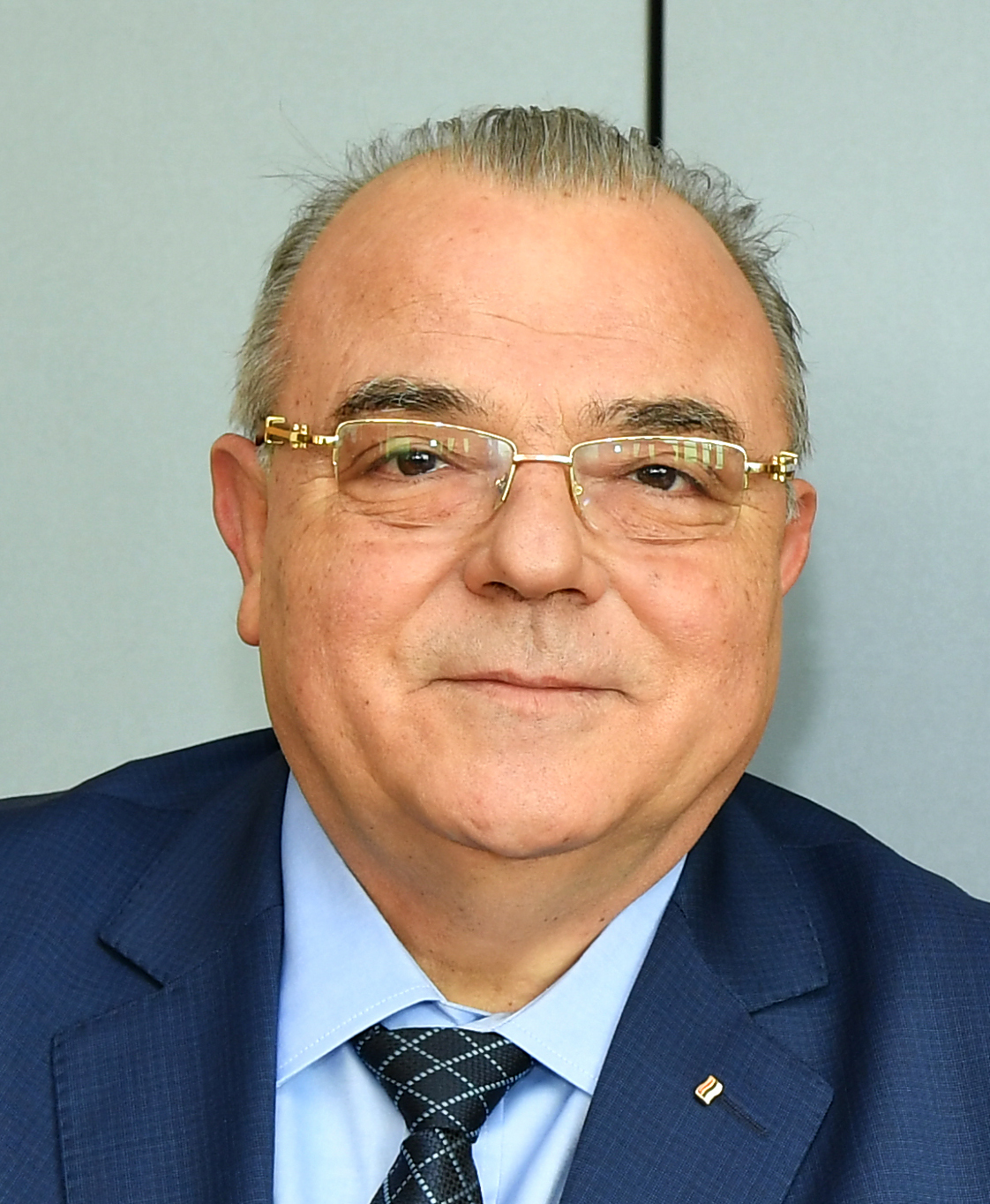
- Born: 19 June 1955 (age 71); Burgas, Bulgaria

Academic background
- Education: UNWE

Academic work
- Discipline: Macroeconomics and Economy of Bulgaria

Stati Vasilev Statev (Bulgarian: Стати Василев Статев) is a Bulgarian scientist, economist and mathematician, and professor at University of National and World Economy. He is the rector of that same university since December 19, 2011.

== Biography ==
Statev was born on June 19, 1955, in Bourgas, Bulgaria. He graduated from the National High School of Mathematics in Sofia in 1974. He continued his education at the Higher Institute of Economics "Karl Marx" (today University of National and World Economy), where he graduated in "Political Economy" (1976 – 1980) and "Mathematics" at Sofia University (1981–1984). He is a doctor of Economic Sciences since 1987. Since November 1980 Stati Statev worked in the Higher Institute of Economics "Karl Marx", renamed the University of National and World Economy. He was also

- visiting professor at Boston University - between April and June 1990 and between June and August 1991.
- World Bank consultant - between June and September 1990.

He has also lectured at the New Bulgarian University in Sofia and the University of Piraeus, Greece. He has more than 180 scientific publications in Bulgarian, English, Russian, Polish, Greek, Serbian and Albanian.
