= Multicaixa =

- Operating area: Angola
- Members: 19
- ATMs: 1,629
- Founded: 2002

Multicaixa (MCX) is currently the only brand name for debit cards issued in Angola, and also the only interbank network of automated teller machines and point of sales terminals for electronic payments. While the ATMs and the POS (point of sale) terminals are owned by the supporting bank, the network is operated by EMIS (Empresa Interbancária de Serviços S.A.), and the Multicaixa cards of any bank are accepted at the same terms at any Multicaixa ATM or POS terminal. This is regulated by the national law on Angolan payment systems, the BNA directive No. 9/2011 of 13 October on the regulation of bank payment cards, and various other laws and directives regulating the Angolan financial system.

The ATMs accept Multicaixa debit cards and Visa credit cards (Visa credit cards are the only ones issued in Angola). EMIS is currently preparing for the acceptance of other international credit card brands like MasterCard. Besides cash advance and withdrawal, the ATMs offer other services like consultation of account balance and movements, transfer of funds to pay utility invoices, and recharging of prepaid mobile phone accounts.

The debit cards are issued by the bank where the customer has a bank account, using services of EMIS. Besides debit cards linked to a bank account, stored-value cards (prepaid debit cards) also exist, with and without the possibility to recharge them.

At the end of 2011, there were 2.377.969 valid Multicaixa cards, out of which 1.559.841 were being used at least once in their time of validity. There were 1.629 ATMs installed in the country, and 18.199 POS terminals. 81.943.904 transactions were performed at the ATMs in 2011, and 9.063.863 transactions on the POS terminals. Only 11% of the Angolan population has a bank account.

== See also ==
- Banco Nacional de Angola
