= Empresa Interbancária de Serviços =

Interbank network for all electronic payments in Angola

EMIS logo

The Empresa Interbancária de Serviços S.A. (EMIS – English: Interbank Service Company) is the operator of the Angolan interbank network for the network of ATMs and Point-of-Sale (POS) terminals for automatic payments under the brand name of Multicaixa. EMIS is also the clearing house for those payments and for direct debit and funds transfer operations (Giro) for all banks in Angola.

The legal basis for EMIS' existence and activity is the national law on Angolan payment systems, the BNA directive No. 9/2011 of 13 October on the regulation of bank payment cards, and various other laws and directives regulating the Angolan financial system.

The main shareholder of EMIS S.A. is the Angolan central bank, the Banco Nacional de Angola (BNA) with initially 51%, now reduced to 45%. The actual banks participating in the interbank network hold participations from 1.97% (four banks) up to 6.5% of the shares (Banco do Fomento de Angola).

EMIS prepares a system of mobile payment, i.e. transferring money via mobile phone, whereby EMIS intends to play the role of what they call an MVPO - Mobile Virtual Processor Operator. and describe as an entity which acts as the processor of the mobile payment services in the name of the banks being represented, using the technology and infrastructure of the Mobile Network Operators. EMIS would provide the direct interface to the user, acting in a collaborational model for the participating banks.

== See also ==
- Multicaixa
- Banco Nacional de Angola
- List of banks in Angola
