= Armando Manuel =

Technocrat and Angolan politician

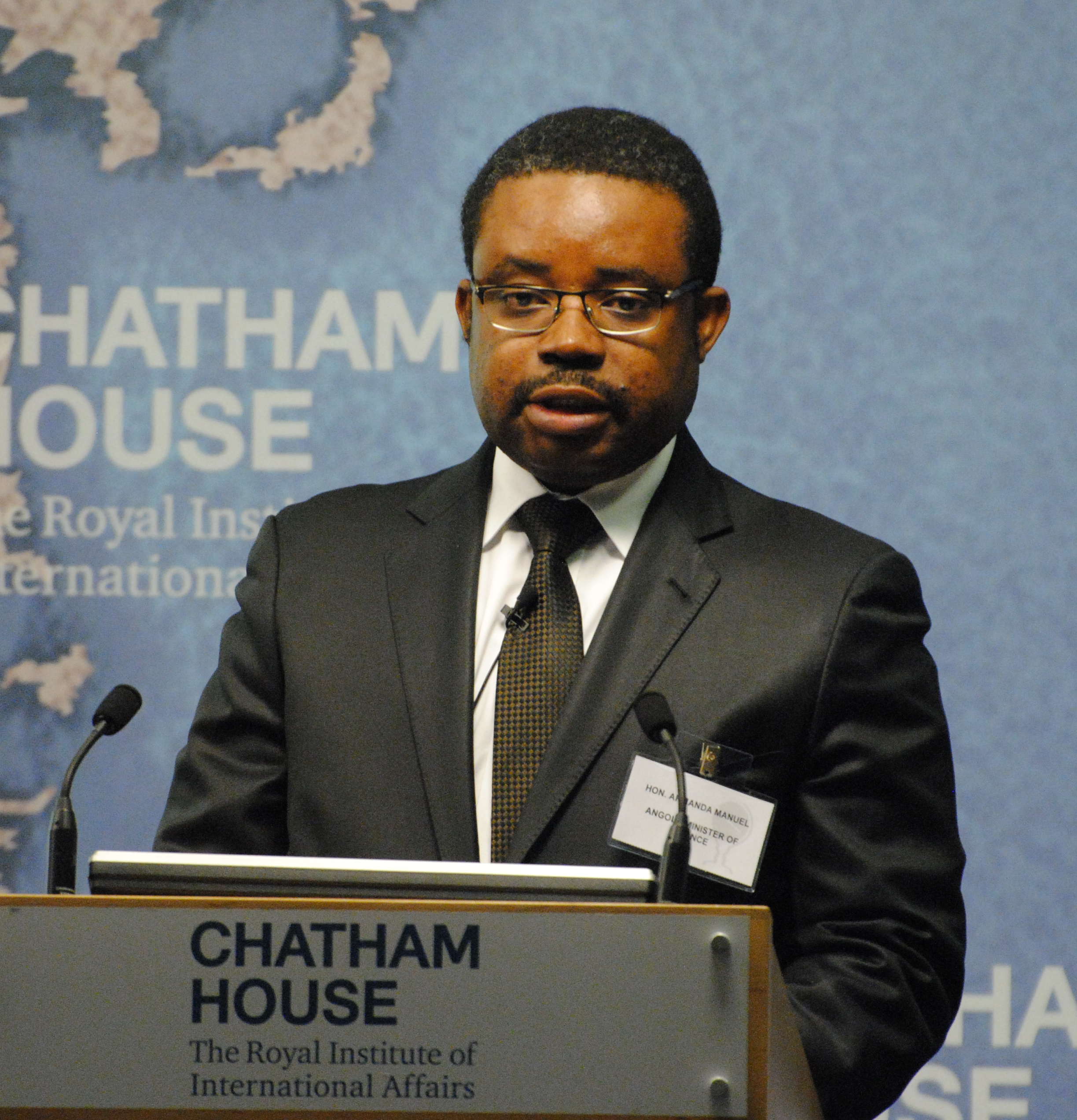
- Manuel at Chatham House, March 2016

Minister of Finance
- In office 9 May 2013 – 5 September 2016
- President: José Eduardo dos Santos
- Preceded by: Carlos Alberto Lopes
- Succeeded by: Archer Mangueira

Personal details
- Born: 24 March 1972 (age 54)
- Party: People's Movement for the Liberation of Angola
- Education: Agostinho Neto University; London Guildhall University

Armando Manuel (born March 24, 1972) is an Angolan MPLA politician who was Minister of Finance of Angola from 2013 to 2016. Prior to his appointment, he served as the Secretary for Economic Affairs of the President and the Chairman of the Angola Sovereign Wealth Fund.

== Early life and education ==
Manuel graduated in economics from the Agostinho Neto University in 1996, and holds a MSc in economics from London Guildhall University in 2001.

== Politics ==
In 2002, Manuel led the Department of Treasury's operations, and moved to the Ministry of Finance in 2006 to become the department's director. While in the Ministry of Finance, Manuel was appointed Minister of Finance on 9 May 2013 and took over Carlos Alberto Lopes's position.

On 17 August 2015, Manuel cosigned an agreement for ¥23.6 trillion with JICA's president Akihiko Tanaka.

Manuel remained the Minister of Finance until 5 September 2016 when he was fired by the President of Angola José Eduardo dos Santos and replaced by Archer Mangueira.

== Economy ==
In October 2015, Manuel signed off on an agreement to sell bonds valued up to $2 billion as a temporary solution for the stalled debut of the Eurobond. When Angola's Eurobond was sold on November 5, 2015, for $1.5 billion, Manuel did not reveal what the funds would be used for.

In April 2016, Angola requested help from the IMF due to the country's low oil prices. Manuel emphasized that Angola was seeking aid to strengthen Angola's economy, and not asking for a bailout from the IMF. The negotiations between the IMF and Angola ended July 2016, which led to Manuel's firing.

Political offices
Preceded by Carlos Alberto Lopes	Minister of Finance; 2013–2016	Succeeded by Archer Mangueira
