= Álvaro Arnaldo Craveiro =

Angolan politician

Minister of Finance
- In office March 1994 – May 1995
- Preceded by: Emanuel Carneiro
- Succeeded by: Augusto da Silva Tomás

Personal details
- Occupation: Politician

Álvaro Arnaldo Craveiro was the Angolan finance minister in the government of Jose Eduardo dos Santos from March 1994 to May 1995.
