= Aguinaldo Jaime =

Angolan politician (born 1954)

CEO of the Angolan Insurance Regulation and Supervision Agency
- Incumbent
- Assumed office 2017
- Preceded by: Position established

Foreign Investment Office Director
- In office 1989–1990
- Preceded by: Position established
- Succeeded by: Maria Luísa Abrantes

Minister of Finance
- In office June 1990 – April 1992
- Preceded by: Augusto Teixeira de Matos
- Succeeded by: Mário Alcântara Monteiro

Governor of the National Bank of Angola
- In office 1999–2002
- Preceded by: Sebastião Lavrador
- Succeeded by: Amadeu Maurício

Personal details
- Born: January 15, 1954 (age 72) Luanda, Angola
- Party: MPLA

Aguinaldo Jaime (born January 15, 1954) is an Angolan political figure and economist. He served as Minister of Finance from June 1990 to April 1992, President of the African Investment Bank (beginning in 1996), and as Central Bank Governor from 1999 to 2002. He was subsequently Deputy Prime Minister. He is also alumnus of London School of Economics.

Preceded by Augusto Teixeira Jorge de Matos	Minister of Finance; 1990–1992	Succeeded by Mário de Alcântara Monteiro
