= Ismael Martins =

Angolan diplomat and political figure

H.E. Ismael Abraão Gaspar Martins

Permanent Representative to the United Nations for Angola
- Incumbent
- Assumed office May 2001

Personal details
- Born: 12 January 1940 (age 86)

Ismael Abraão Gaspar Martins (born 12 January 1940) is an Angolan diplomat and political figure who has been Angola's Permanent Representative to the United Nations since 2001. Previously he was Minister of Finance from 1977 to 1982, Minister of External Trade from 1982 to 1987, and Executive Director of the African Development Bank from 1989 to 1995.

== Background ==
Born at Luanda, Martins holds a Bachelor's degree in economics from Lycoming College in Pennsylvania, United States. He completed his post-graduate studies in economics at the University of Mannheim, Germany in 1969. Martins then attended Oxford University in the UK, receiving a diploma in economic development.

He is married and has four children.

== Early career ==
From 1971 to 1972, Martins worked as a research officer on agricultural development policies in Africa for the United Nations Research Institute for Social Development in Geneva.

He then served with the United Nations Conference on Trade and Development (UNCTAD) from 1972 to 1975 as an economic affairs officer, overseeing studies and policies on the issue of economic integration in Africa, and on trade negotiations between the African, Caribbean and Pacific Group of States and the European Union.

In 1975, he was appointed external and economic affairs adviser to the President of Angola, Agostinho Neto. From 1976 to 1977, Gaspar Martins was Governor of the Central Bank of Angola, before serving as Minister of Finance until 1982. He was appointed as Angola's Minister of External Trade in 1982, and worked in this position until 1987. From 1989 to 1995, Ismael Gaspar Martins was the Executive Director of the African Development Bank, based in Abidjan, Ivory Coast.

From 1996 to 2000, Martins served on the Southern African Development Community Task Force at the World Economic Forum Summit. In 1996, he was a founding member and Co-President of the Angola-South Africa Chamber of Commerce and Industry. He also held the position of Managing Director of Gaspar Martins and Associates (a business consultancy firm).

== Diplomatic career ==
In April 2001, President José Eduardo dos Santos appointed Martins as roving Ambassador, and in May 2001 as the new Ambassador to the United Nations. In a ceremony in Luanda, Ambassador Martins said he would work to help the UN play a "decisive role" in Angola as the country searches for peace, stability and development.

At the 2015 United Nations Climate Change Conference, Gaspar Martins represented the 28 Least Developed Countries (LDC Group), which negotiated as a bloc.

Political offices
Preceded by Saidy Vieira Dias Mingas	Minister of Finance; 1977–1982	Succeeded by Augusto Teixeira Jorge de Matos
Preceded by Lopo do Nascimento	Minister of Foreign Trade; 1982–1987	Succeeded by Dumilde das Chagas Rangel
Preceded by José Gonçalves Martins Patrício	Ambassador of Angola to the United Nations; 2001–2018	Succeeded by Maria de Jesus dos Reis Ferreira
