= Peter Bogaevsky =

Peter Mikhailovich Bogaevsky (or Bogayevsky) (Russian: Пётр Михайлович Богаевский) (Bulgarian: Петър Михайлович Богаевски) (January 23, 1866 — January 29, 1929) was a professor of international law in the Russian Empire. He was a professor at Tomsk University and later at Kiev University where he founded and directed the Kiev Institute for Near East. Following the Socialist revolution, he fled as an emigre to Sofia, Bulgaria where he assumed the post of professor of international law at the University of Sofia. With Stefan Bobchev he founded the Free University of Political and Economic Science. It was then also known as the Balkan Institute of the Near East, and was a private, but state-recognized institute which drew on the Ecole des Sciences Politiques as a model, and offered courses in diplomatic and consular services, administration and finance, and other areas.

== See also ==
- List of Russian legal historians
- Scholars in Russian law
