= Ministry of Finance (Angola) =

Government ministry of Angola

Ministry of Finance MINFIN
- Ministério das Finanças

Ministry overview
- Formed: 1976
- Type: Ministry
- Jurisdiction: Government of Angola
- Headquarters: Luanda
- Ministry executive: Vera Daves, Minister of Finance
- Website: minfin.gov.ao

The Ministry of Finance (Portuguese: Ministério das Finanças, MINFIN) is a cabinet-level ministry of the government of Angola. It traces it origin to 1976, and was created as a replacement for the Portuguese colonial-period Direcção dos Serviços de Fazenda e Contabilidade. The current Minister of Finance is Vera Daves.

== Mission ==
The mission of the Ministry of Finance is to "promote the use of public resources efficiently and effectively in the interest of sustained development, within the national interest and regional integration, in a framework of macroeconomic stability; promote and stimulate economic activity in competitive market conditions; promote equitable distribution of national income redistribution through the implementation of fiscal policies and income and remedial pricing."

== List of ministers of finance ==
| Minister | From | To |
|---|---|---|
| Saidy Vieira Dias Mingas | November 1975 | May 1977 |
| Ismael Gaspar Martins | August 1977 | August 1982 |
| Augusto Teixeira Jorge de Matos | August 1982 | June 1990 |
| Aguinaldo Jaime | June 1990 | April 1992 |
| Mário de Alcântara Monteiro | April 1992 | December 1992 |
| Salomão José Luheto Xirimbimbi | December 1992 | February 1993 |
| Emanuel Carneiro | February 1993 | March 1994 |
| Álvaro Arnaldo Craveiro | March 1994 | May 1995 |
| Augusto da Silva Tomás | May 1995 | March 1996 |
| Mário de Alcântara Monteiro | March 1996 | June 1999 |
| Joaquim D. C. David | June 1999 | October 2000 |
| Júlio Marcelino Vieira Bessa | October 2000 | December 2002 |
| José Pedro de Morais | December 2002 | October 2008 |
| Eduardo Leopoldo Severin de Morais | October 2008 | February 2010 |
| Carlos Alberto Lopes | February 2010 | May 2013 |
| Armando Manuel | May 2013 | September 5, 2016 |
| Archer Mangueira | September 5, 2016 | October 9, 2019 |
| Vera Daves | October 9, 2019 | present |
