= Vera Daves =

Angolan politician

Vera Esperança dos Santos Daves De Sousa
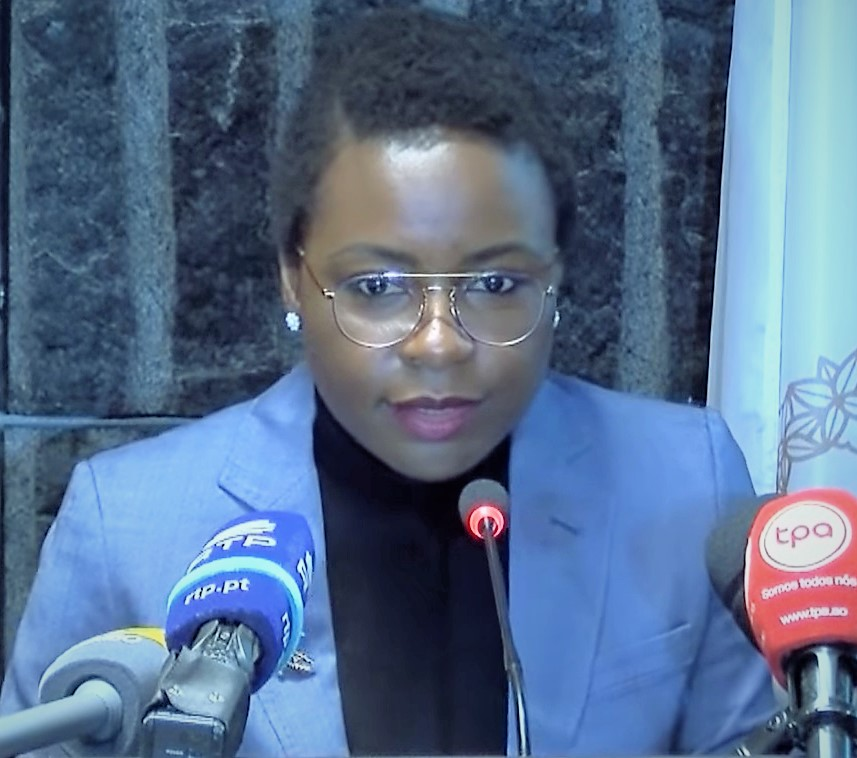
- Daves giving a press conference in 2014

Minister of Finance
- Incumbent
- Assumed office 8 October 2019
- Preceded by: Archer Mangueira

Personal details
- Born: 1984 (age 41–42) Luanda
- Party: Popular Movement for the Liberation of Angola
- Education: Catholic University of Angola

Vera Esperança dos Santos Daves De Sousa (born 1984) is an Angolan politician who has been the country's Minister of Finance since 2019.

== Early life and education ==
Daves was born in Luanda and has a degree in economics from the Catholic University of Angola.

== Career ==
Daves was the head of research for a local bank in 2011, and became a regular commentator on TV discussing finance and the economy. The chair of the Capital Markets Commission, Archer Mangueira, saw her on television and invited her onto the board. She was the executive administrator of the commission from 2014 to 2016 and replaced Mangueira as head of the commission in 2016.

Daves is the co-author of a book on public finance with Alves da Rocha, a professor of economics.

Daves served as Angola's Secretary of State for Finance and Treasury before being appointed by President João Lourenço as Minister of Finance on 8 October 2019 at age 35, the first woman to hold the role. She succeeded Mangueira, who left the role to become governor of Namibe Province. Daves joined the Political Bureau of the ruling MPLA party at an extraordinary congress shortly before her appointment. She has been described as a "very disciplined, well prepared and competent technician."

When she took on the role, Daves was tasked with restructuring the country's economy, Africa's fifth largest. In March 2020, she announced that the country was in a recession, and that the Finance Ministry was revising the General State Budget due to the impact of the COVID-19 pandemic and in April, she announced all contracts whose funding had not been secured were suspended based on the low price of oil and the impact of the pandemic on public finances.

== Other activities ==
- African Development Bank (AfDB), Ex-Officio Member of the Board of Governors (since 2019)
- International Monetary Fund (IMF), Ex-Officio Member of the Board of Governors (since 2019)
- World Bank, Ex-Officio Member of the Board of Governors (since 2019)
