= Faculty of Law, University of National and World Economy =

Bulgarian law school

Coordinates: 42.6513°N 23.3490°E

UNWE Law School
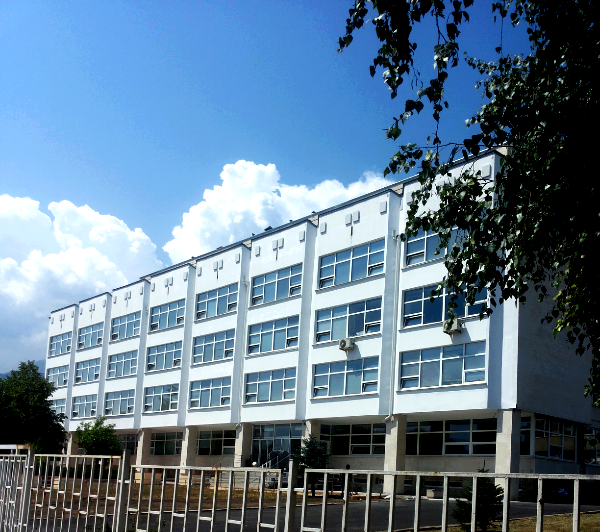
- Established: 1991
- School type: State
- Dean: doc. dr. Zachary Tormanov
- Location: Sofia, Student city, Bulgaria
- Enrollment: 800

The Law Faculty of University of National and World Economy (Bulgarian: Юридически факултет при Университета за национално и световно стопанство) is a law school located in Sofia, Bulgaria.

The Faculty of Law was established by the Academic Council Decision of March 20, 1991, initially as the Legal Department on the basis of the Department of Legal Studies that has existed at UNWE Bulgaria since 1920. By the Academic Council Decision of May 31, 1995 it was transformed into a Faculty.

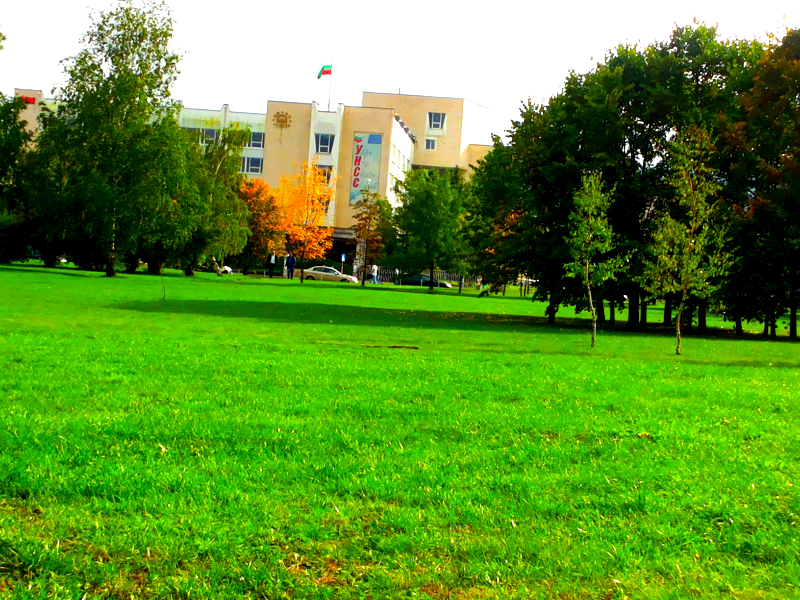
University of National and World Economy main building

== The Faculty of Law ==
The Faculty consists of 4 main departments: Private law, Public Law, Criminal Law and International law.

The academic body of the Faculty consists of 80 lecturers involving 11 professors, 17 associate professors and 52 non full-tenure lecturers.

== Mission ==
The main mission of the Faculty is to provide a high-quality training in Law of the students and doctoral students in the educational qualification degree of Master and Doctor.

== Educational ==
The period of training for master's degree is 11 semesters and completes with the laying of three state exams: Civil Law, Criminal Law and Public Law in accordance with the Ordinance on the Unified State Requirements for Acquisition of a Higher Education in Law. Graduates obtain the professional qualification of a lawyer and acquire legal capacity after a 3-month period of practice and after laying the practical and theoretical examination in accordance with the requirements of the Judicial System Act and the Bar Act.

Within the education in Law and based on a long-term contract with the American Center for Legal Studies in Salzburg, Austria, from the beginning of the 2006/2007 academic year each semester is held a separate course in American Law by highly skilled American attorneys. The training is done entirely in English within 45 academic hours.

== Accreditation ==
The programme accreditation of Law speciality is made in 2004 (at an assembly of the Accreditation Board of the National Agency for Assessment and Accreditation of 13.05.2004). The speciality of Law is given a positive assessment by all standards that is a prerequisite for the higher educational purposes of the specialty, the quality of training and the opportunities for professional realization of the graduates of Law.

The training for the acquisition of educational qualification degree of Doctor of Law is based on the Accreditation Board Decision of the National Agency for Assessment and Accreditation of 03.06.2004. The Faculty of Law is accredited to train doctoral students in the scientific specialty 05.05.07 - Administrative Law and Procedure as also in the scientific specialty 05.05.08 - Civil and Family Law. There are 10 doctoral students in the process of learning at the Faculty..

The Departments of History, Social and Economic Theories and Philosophy provide the academic plan at the Legal Faculty for the compulsory and elective disciplines of these fields as well as the academic process of some other disciplines at UNWE.
