= Abraão Gourgel =

Angolan economist and politician

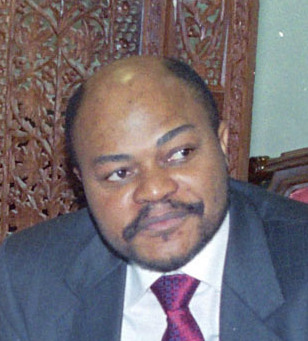

Abraão Pio dos Santos Gourgel is an Angolan economist who served as Minister of Industry, and former Minister of Economy and Finance. He was Governor of the National Reserve Bank (BNA) from 2009 to 2010, and Chairman of the Board of Directors of the Development Bank of Angola (BDA). He was fired from this position in January 2020 and replaced by Henda Essanju Inglês.
