= José Pedro de Morais =

Angolan politician

Minister of Planning and Economic Coordination
- In office 1994–1996
- Succeeded by: Emmanuel M. Carneiro

Minister of Finance
- In office 2002–2008
- Preceded by: Júlio Bessa
- Succeeded by: Eduardo L.S. de Morais

Governor of the National Bank of Angola
- In office 2015–2016
- Preceded by: José de Lima Massano
- Succeeded by: Valter F.D. da Silva

Personal details
- Born: December 20, 1955 (age 70) Kuito, Bié, Angola
- Party: MPLA

José Pedro de Morais Júnior (born 20 December 1955 in Kuito, Bie Province) is an Angolan politician, who served as Minister of Finance from December 2002 to October 2008, replacing Júlio Marcelino Vieira Bessa. In January 2015, he was appointed Governor of the National Bank of Angola.

== Career ==
- Director, foreign trade, Ministry of Industry, 1977–1984;
- United Nations Development Programme, 1984–87;
- Director, international cooperation, Ministry of Industry, 1987;
- Director, economic affairs, Ministry of External Relations, 1989–90;
- Advisor, Ministry of Industry, 1990–91;
- Secretary of State for Construction, 1991–92;
- Governor, World Bank, 1993;
- Coordinator, European Fund for Development, 1993;
- Minister of Planning and Economic Coordination, 1994-1996;
- Executive Director, International Monetary Fund, 1996 to date;
- Minister of Finance, 2002-2008.

Preceded by Júlio Marcelino Vieira Bessa	Minister of Finance; 2002–2008	Succeeded by Eduardo Leopoldo Severin de Morais
