= Pedro Luís da Fonseca =

Angolan politician and economist

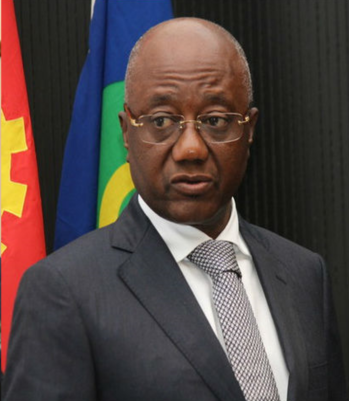

Personal details
- Born: November 17, 1957 Luanda, Luanda Province, Angola
- Education: University of National and World Economy
- Occupation: Economist, politician,

Pedro Luís da Fonseca is an Angolan politician and economist. He served as Minister of Economy and Planning of Angola from 2017 to 2019.

== Biography ==
He was born in Luanda on November 17, 1957. He graduated in Economics at the Higher Institute of Economics, Karl Marx in Bulgaria – now University of National and World Economy (1986). Following his studies, in 1988, he started working at the Angolan Trade Ministry as National Director of International Economics Relations and Trade National Director, a position he held until 1994. He was then, in 1996, appointed for a year as National Director of Economic Planning before becoming the National Director of Studies and Planning until 2007. In 2007, he became Deputy Minister of Planning, continuing this until 2012. He was then appointed State Secretary of Planning and Territorial Development, the last position he held before becoming minister.

From October 2017 to July 2019 he served as Minister of Economy and Planning of Angola under President João Lourenço. Following his resignation from the position, in August 2019, he became President of the Board of Directors of Banco Económico.

In 2022, he was appointed as President of the Board of Directors of the Banco de Comércio e Indústria (BCI). Closely prior to his appointment, BCI was acquired by the Cart Group, which has been tied to the Angolan government. BCI was under significant financial losses whenever Fonseca took leadership, and was required to submit a restructuring plan. Some criticism was given over his appointment, with some arguing that it reflects the continuity of ruling parties, and that most banks were filled by former government officials. In 2024, the Angolan government announced that he would serve as Alternative Executive Director assisting the Nigerian Zainab Ahmed, until he would eventually start in 2026, becoming Executive Director at the World Bank for Angola, South Africa, and Nigeria.

== Other activities ==
- World Bank, Ex-Officio Alternate Member of the Board of Governors
