= Augusto da Silva Tomás =

Angolan politician

Personal details
- Born: October 6, 1957 (age 68) Cabinda
- Political party: Popular Movement for the Liberation of Angola

Augusto da Silva Tomás is Angolan politician. He was Minister of Finance from May 1995 to March 1996. He was the Angolan minister for transport from 2008 to 2017. He was arrested on corruption charges in September 2018.

Political offices
Preceded by Jorge Barros Chimpuati	Governor of Cabinda; January 1990-1995	Succeeded by José Amaro Tati
Preceded by Álvaro Arnaldo Craveiro	Minister of Finance; 1995–1996	Succeeded by Mário de Alcântara Monteiro
Preceded by Manuel Pedro Pacavira	Minister of Transports; 2008–2017	Succeeded by Ricardo de Abreu
