= Studentski grad, Sofia =

Student campus area for most universities in Sofia, Bulgaria

Coordinates: 42°39′7.08″N 23°20′50.42″E

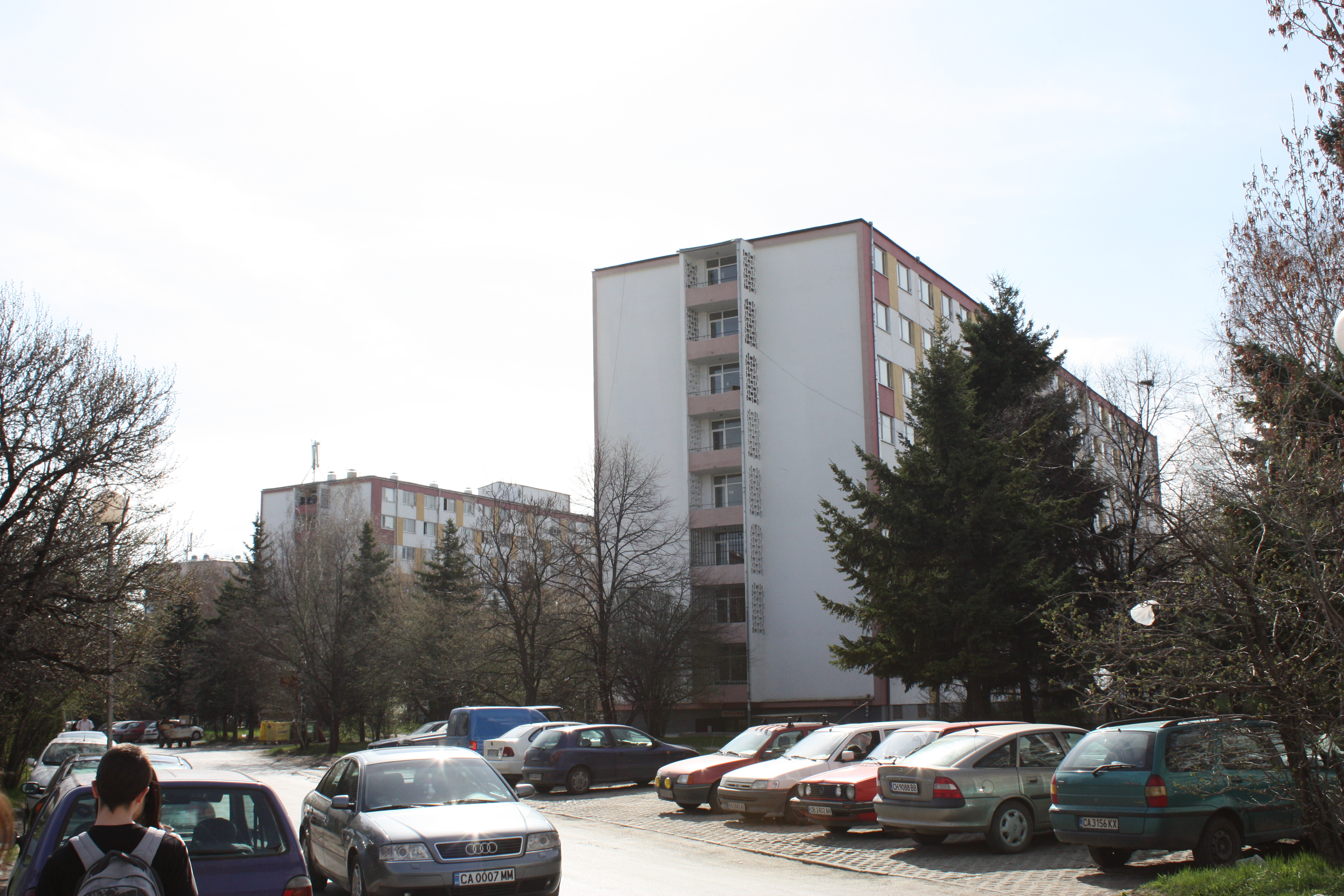
- Studentski grad's campuses - Block 1, Block 2, Block 3, Block 4
- Interactive map of Studentski grad, Sofia

Studentski grad (Bulgarian: Студентски град [stoˈdɛntski ˈɡrat], 'Students' town/city') is the student campus area for most universities in Sofia, the capital of Bulgaria, and also one of the 24 districts of Sofia. It was created in the 1980s and now has over 40,000 residents, although it is difficult to estimate the true number of temporary residents.

It is one of the most diversified areas in Sofia, with old dwellings from the communist era which are inhabited by the students of different Sofia universities, and new nightclubs and trade, business and residential centres. The construction boom has already taken its toll, as overdevelopment appears ubiquitous. Parking lots and green areas remain inadequate. The year 2011 marked the set-up of the largest skatepark on the Balkans situated within the park area in front of the University of National and World Economy. Two multifunctional halls, Hristo Botev and the Winter Palace of Sports, host a number of events on a regular basis. Recent renovations have brought about improvements in many dormitories, including those hosting foreign students. They are mostly from the Bulgarian diaspora in North Macedonia, Moldova, Ukraine, and Serbia, and, since 2004, non-Bulgarians from Turkey.

The area is famous for its busy nightlife. A variety of taverns and disco clubs make the campus one of the central night entertainment locations of Sofia. Studentski grad hosts a district police department that strives to tackle the fast-growing alcohol-driven offenses, thefts, vandalism, football fans clashing, etc. The brutal murder of the student Stojan Baltov by drunken youths outside a disco club sparked debates on social environment and security issues, including the development of an integral video surveillance system. Also, on the night of May 18, 2024, a woman was abducted by sex traffickers in the area, but she was rescued by police the same night. Places for eating out vary from high-end restaurants to cheap pizzerias. Particularly popular used to be the so-called Mandzha street where a number of banitsa pastry, burger, Döner kebab and pancake shops were lined up. A multifunctional building has now replaced this once-famous spot.

Unlike most campus areas in Western Europe and North America, Studentski grad is a common living place for most of the students of Sofia's numerous universities rather than being in the vicinity of one particular university. This helps students from different higher education institutions meet and interact, but on the other hand causes major transportation issues, as the bulk of Sofia's university faculties are situated relatively far from the city center and public transport is often unable to cope with Studentski grad's needs. The traffic is frequently congested, especially during rush hours in the mornings and late afternoons. Regular buses run on average every ten minutes. Fixed-route minibus taxis called marshrutka alleviate the situation. Sofia municipality plans to connect Studentski grad with its metro system.

The neighbourhood is affectionately known as "Stuttgart". The abbreviation from Stud. (Studentski, "student") and grad ("city") resembles the name of the German city of Stuttgart.

== Universities located in Studentski grad ==
- Technical University of Sofia
- University of National and World Economy
- University of Mining and Geology
- University of Forestry, Sofia
- University of Chemical Technology and Metallurgy
- National Sports Academy, ''Vassil Levski''
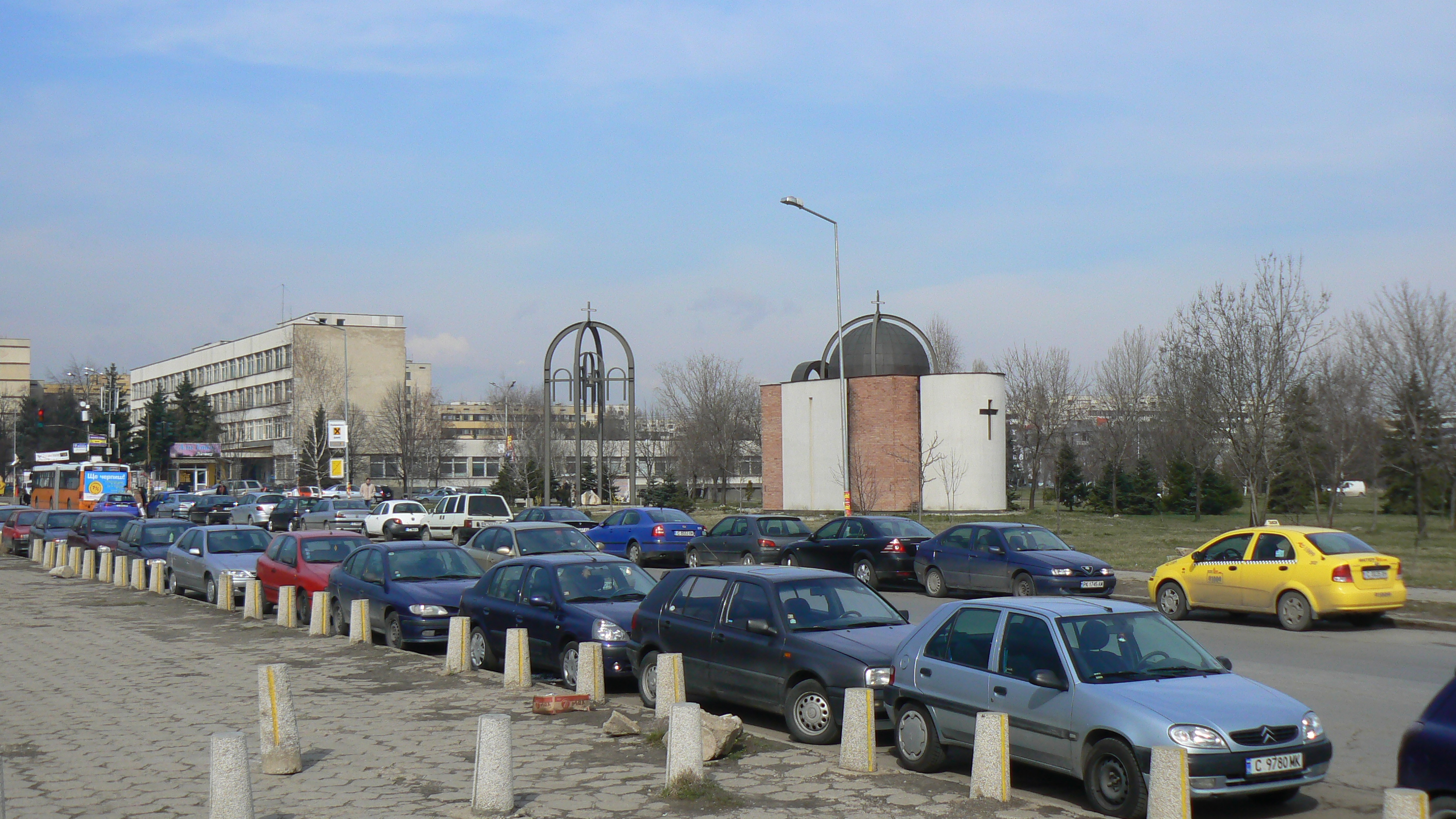
View of Studentski grad with the chapel and the polyclinic

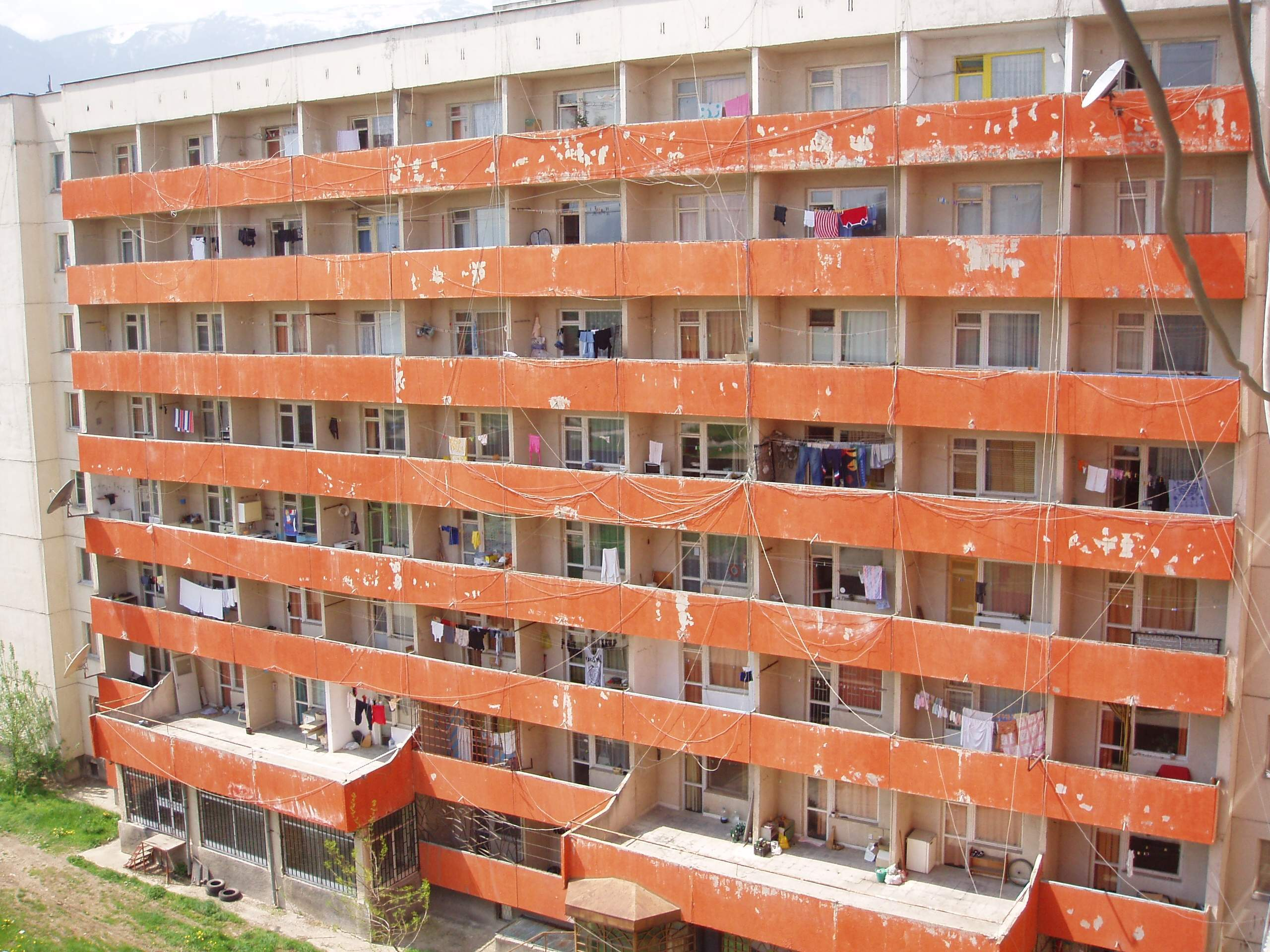
A student dormitory in Studentski grad

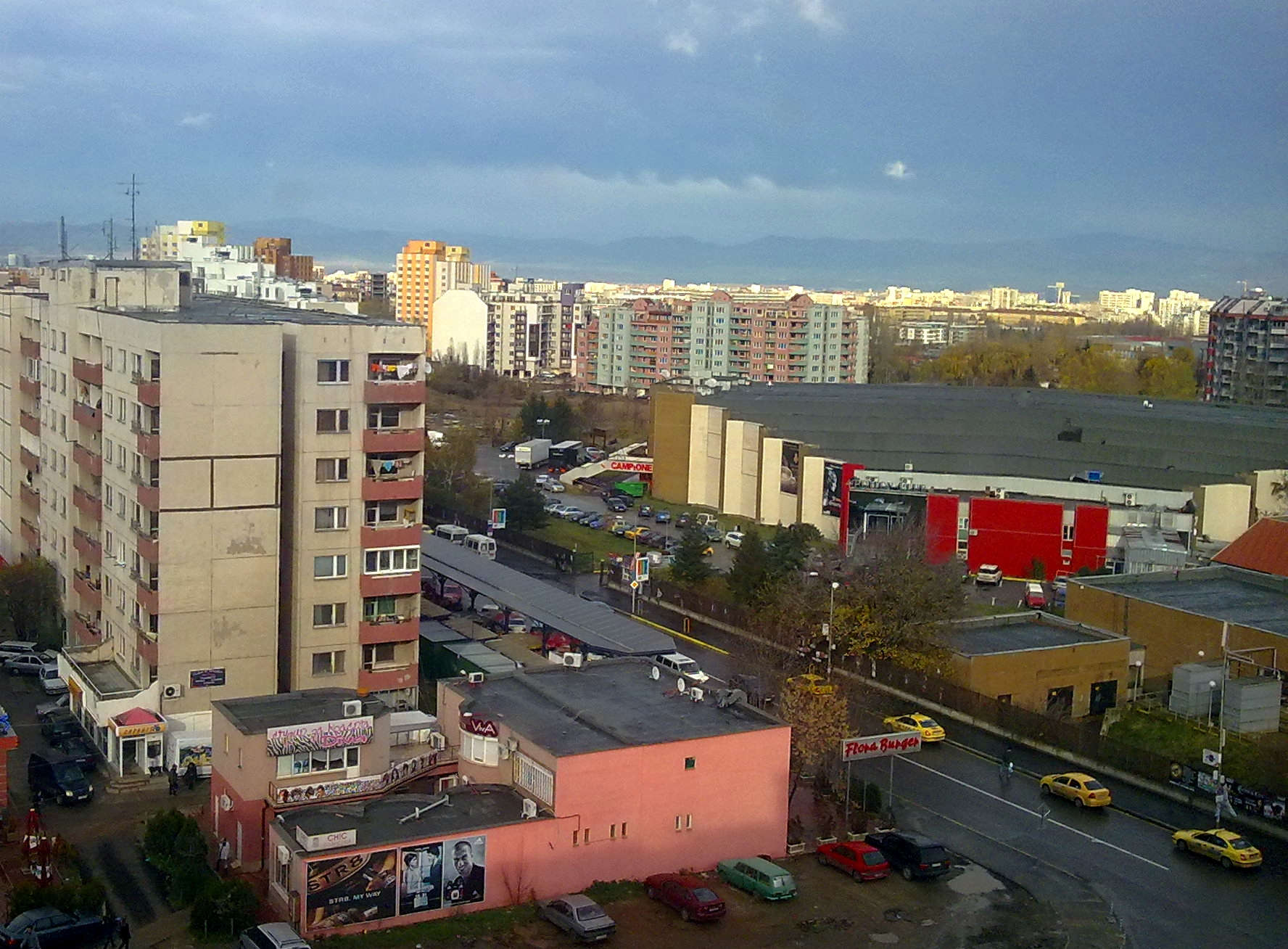
The Winter Palace of Sports on the right along "Akad. Boris Stefanov" Str.
