= National Bank of Angola =

Central bank of Angola

National Bank of Angola Banco Nacional de Angola
- Seal of the National Bank of Angola

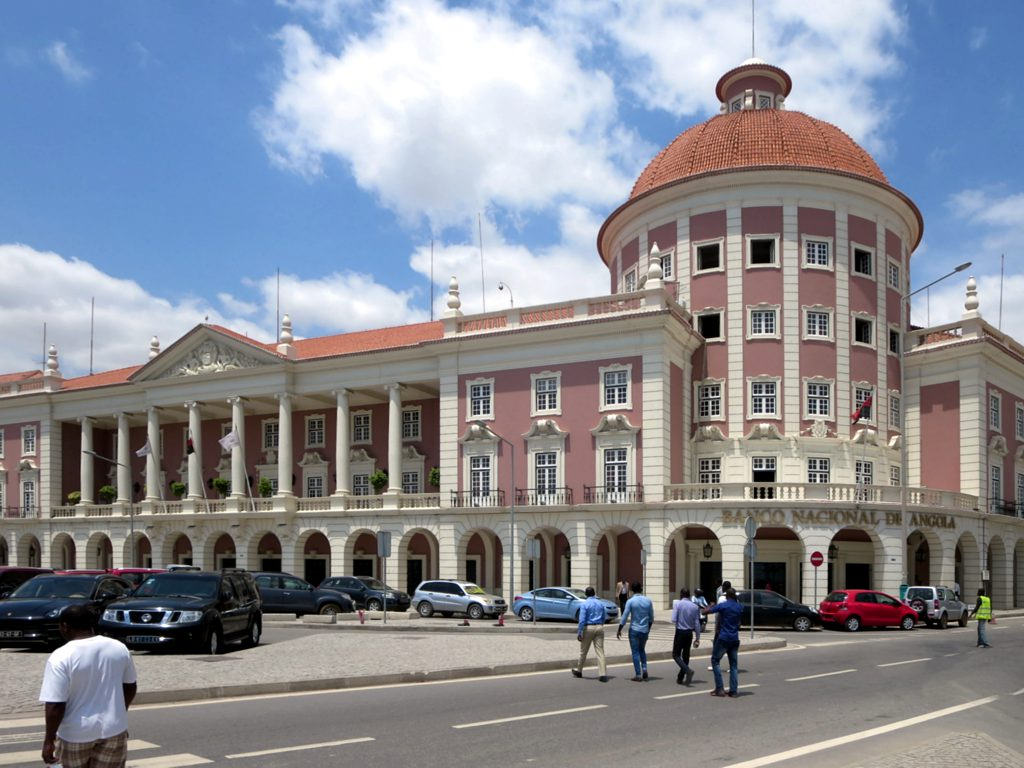
- NBA headquarters
- Central bank of: Angola
- Headquarters: Luanda
- Coordinates: 8.810730°S 13.234070°E
- Established: 14 August 1926; 99 years ago
- Ownership: 100% state ownership
- Governor: Manuel António Tiago Dias
- Currency: Angolan kwanza AOA (ISO 4217)
- Reserves: $23.470 billion
- Preceded by: Bank of Angola
- Website: bna.ao

The National Bank of Angola (Portuguese: Banco Nacional de Angola) is the central bank of Angola. It is state-owned and the Government of Angola is the sole shareholder. The bank is based in Luanda, and was created in 1926, but traces its ancestry back to 1865. The National Bank of Angola is active in developing financial inclusion policy and is a member of the Alliance for Financial Inclusion.

== History ==
In 1864, the Banco Nacional Ultramarino (BNU) was established in Lisbon, Portugal, as a bank of issue for all Portuguese overseas territories. The next year, it opened branches in several places, including Angola, which at the time was an overseas province of Portugal. In 1926, the Portuguese established a separate issue bank for Angola, creating the Bank of Angola (Banco de Angola). BNU transferred its branch in Stanleyville to this bank, which in 1934, transferred the branch to Boma, before closing it in 1947.

When Angola gained its independence in 1975, the government nationalized the banking sector. Banco de Angola became Banco Nacional de Angola (BNA); Banco Comercial de Angola became Banco Popular de Angola, and is now Banco de Poupança e Crédito. The BNA continued to function as a central bank, bank of issue and commercial bank. The government also designated it as the only legal holder of foreign currency and delegated to it responsibility for all foreign transactions.

On April 20, 1991, a new law restricted BNA's role to that of a central bank, including being solely responsible for monetary policy and acting as issuing bank, banker of the Government and reserve bank. Beginning in 1999, the Central Bank began implementing reforms to meet international standards.

Bank of Angola is a member of the Alliance for Financial Inclusion and active in the financial inclusion arena.

== Financial fraud at BNA ==
In the largest financial fraud in Angola ever at the time, the Central Bank of Angola was victim of an alleged fraud case of about $160 million that were transferred to overseas accounts in 2009. It was discovered that from the Angolan treasury account at Banco Espírito Santo in London, were leaving several money transfers to bank accounts abroad, controlled by the suspects. When the bill reached the minimum values of the BNA, it was the BES London itself that warned the authorities of Angola for successive outflows of money. The case of fraud was revealed by the Portuguese newspaper Diário de Notícias in June 2011. Several individual are suspected to be involved, and several individuals at the Angolan Finance Ministry and the BNA in Luande were sentenced up to eight years in prison in 2011. There are still investigations going on in Portugal and Angola.

In 2018, an even bigger fraud case was announced when the former president's son, José Filomeno dos Santos was charged with transferring US$500 million from an account belonging to the central bank to a bank account in the UK. Authorities in the UK froze this amount as it was a suspicious transaction and the money can now be returned to the central bank.

== Governors ==
- Gaspar Martins, 1976 - 1977
- José Carlos Víctor de Carvalho, Jan 1978 - Dec 1982
- Augusto Teixeira de Matos, Dec 1982 - Dec 1986
- António Inácio, Dec 1986 - May 1990
- Pedro Cunha Neto, June 1990 - Nov 1990
- Fernando Alberto da Graça Teixeira, Nov 1990 - 1991
- Sebastião Bastos Lavrador, 1991 - 1993
- Generoso Hermenegildo de Almeida, 1993 - 1995
- António Gomes Furtado, 1995 - 1996
- Sebastião Bastos Lavrador, 1996 - 1999
- Aguinaldo Jaime, 1999 - 2002
- Amadeu de Jesus Castelhano Maurício, 2002 - 2009
- Abrahão Pio dos Santos Gourgel, 2009 - 2010
- José de Lima Massano, 2010 - 2015
- José Pedro de Morais, 2015 - 2016
- Valter Duarte Da Silva, 2016 - 2017
- José de Lima Massano, 2017 - 2023
- Manuel António Tiago Dias 2023-

== See also ==
- Central banks and currencies of Africa
- Economy of Africa
- List of central banks
