= University of National and World Economy =

Public university in Sofia, Bulgaria

Coordinates: 42°39′3″N 23°20′55″E

- Университет за национално и световно стопанство
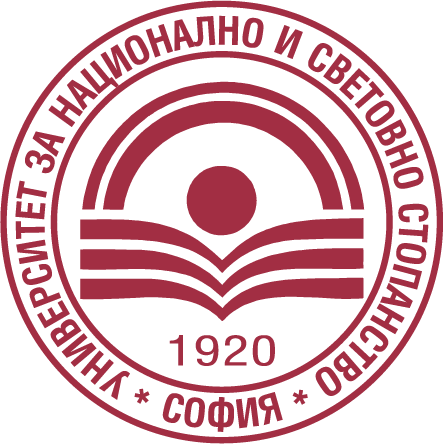
- Motto: Духът прави силата
- Motto in English: The Spirit Makes The Power
- Type: Public
- Established: 1920
- Rector: Dimitar Dimitrov
- Students: 21 430
- Location: Sofia, Bulgaria
- Campus: Urban
- Colours: Purple
- Website: www.unwe.bg/en
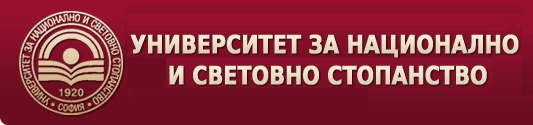

The University of National and World Economy (Bulgarian: Университет за национално и световно стопанство) is a public research university in Sofia, Bulgaria.

Notable alumni of the university are five Prime Ministers of Bulgaria – Reneta Indzhova, Stefan Sofiyanski, Ivan Kostov, Marin Raykov and Plamen Oresharski; the current managing director of the International Monetary Fund – Kristalina Georgieva; and the director of the Financial Markets Group at the London School of Economics and former Minister of Finance of Bulgaria Simeon Djankov.

== History ==
=== Founding ===
UNWE was founded in 1920 as the Free University of Political and Economic Sciences (FUPES) by Stefan Bobchev and the Russian emigre Peter Bogaevsky with ordinance of the Minister of Public Education. In 1940, FUPES was transformed into the State Higher Education School of Finance and Administrative Sciences (SHESFA) and in 1947, SHESFA was transformed into a Faculty of Economic and Social Sciences at Sofia University.

=== Communist period ===
During the communist period in Bulgaria, the university was called the Karl Marx Higher Institute of Economics, but was renamed on 27 April 1990, soon after end of the communist era, due to the perceived failure of communism and, particularly, Marxist economics.

=== Modern period ===
After the democratic changes in Bulgaria, the Academic Board (AB) passed a resolution renaming the Karl Marx Higher Institute of Economics into the University of National and World Economy (On 27 April 1990). Officially this was done with an act of the National Assembly of the Republic of Bulgaria on the establishment and transformation of higher educational institutions (26 July 1995).

Prof. Dimitar Panayotov Dimitrov is the current rector of the university, elected in December 2019.

The university was awarded the Japanese Foreign Minister’s Commendation for their contributions to promotion of economic relations and mutual understanding between Bulgaria and Japan on 1 December 2020.

== International activity ==
UNWE is a leading and coordinating university for Bulgaria in the Central European Initiative for university networking. Development of programmes providing mobility for students and academic staff (in the form of seminars, summer school or a master's degree programme) is in its initial stage. Application for funded joint education is done on the basis of already established contacts with universities from CEI member states whenever students and academic staff are in another foreign university.

== Faculties ==
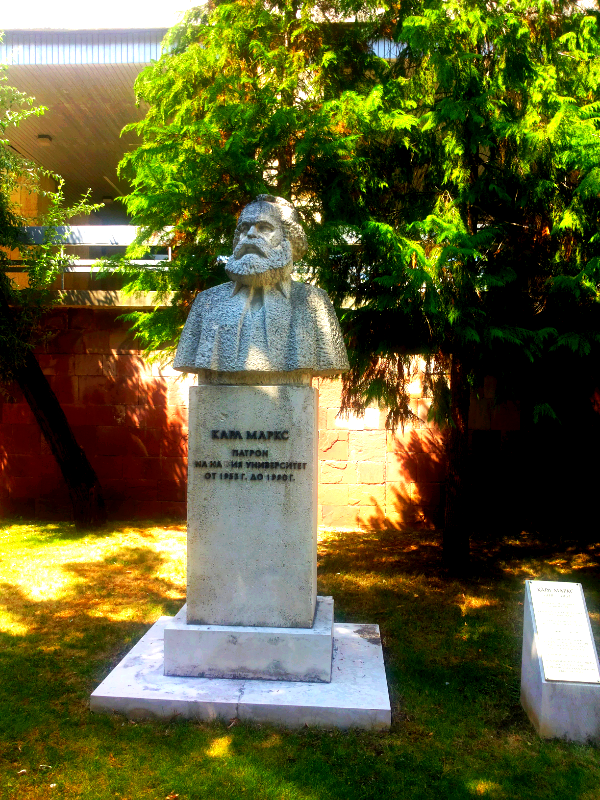
Monument of Karl Marx in UNWE

Faculty	Year founded
Faculty of Finance and Accounting	1920
Faculty of Business	1949
Faculty of General Economics	1958
Faculty of Law	1991 (1920)
Faculty of International Economics and Politics	1995 (1975)
Faculty of Economics of Infrastructure	1995
Faculty of Management and Administration	1995
Faculty of Applied Informatics and Statistics	2008

== Rankings ==
University of National and World Economy is one of the eldest, most prestigious, and largest Universities of Economics in Southeast Europe, a leader in Bulgarian higher education. In 2006, UNWE was given the highest institutional evaluation among all Bulgarian universities by the National Agency for Assessment and Accreditation, in 2007, the professional field of Economics and in 2008, the professional fields of Administration and Management also received the highest estimate that has been given so far in Bulgaria.

The university is not listed in any of the international rankings of universities (QS, Times, Financial Times, Shanghai CWUR ranking). University of National and World Economy is the leader among students in the professional fields of Economics, Administration and Management in Bulgaria. By this criterion, according to the ranking system of the Ministry of Education and Science and the Open Society Institute, UNWE is No. 1.

Ranked by its social insurance income and by the number of registered unemployed UNWE again occupies the top positions: the professional field of Informatics and Computer Science is at the 8th place followed by the professional field of Economics. 0.00% graduates of the professional field of Tourism have registered as unemployed. "Administration and Management", "Law" and "Political Science" at UNWE are the other professional fields at the forefront. It means that all of the six professional education fields at UNWE are at the first positions in the rankings. It is the rating of 112 professional fields of higher education institutes in our country..

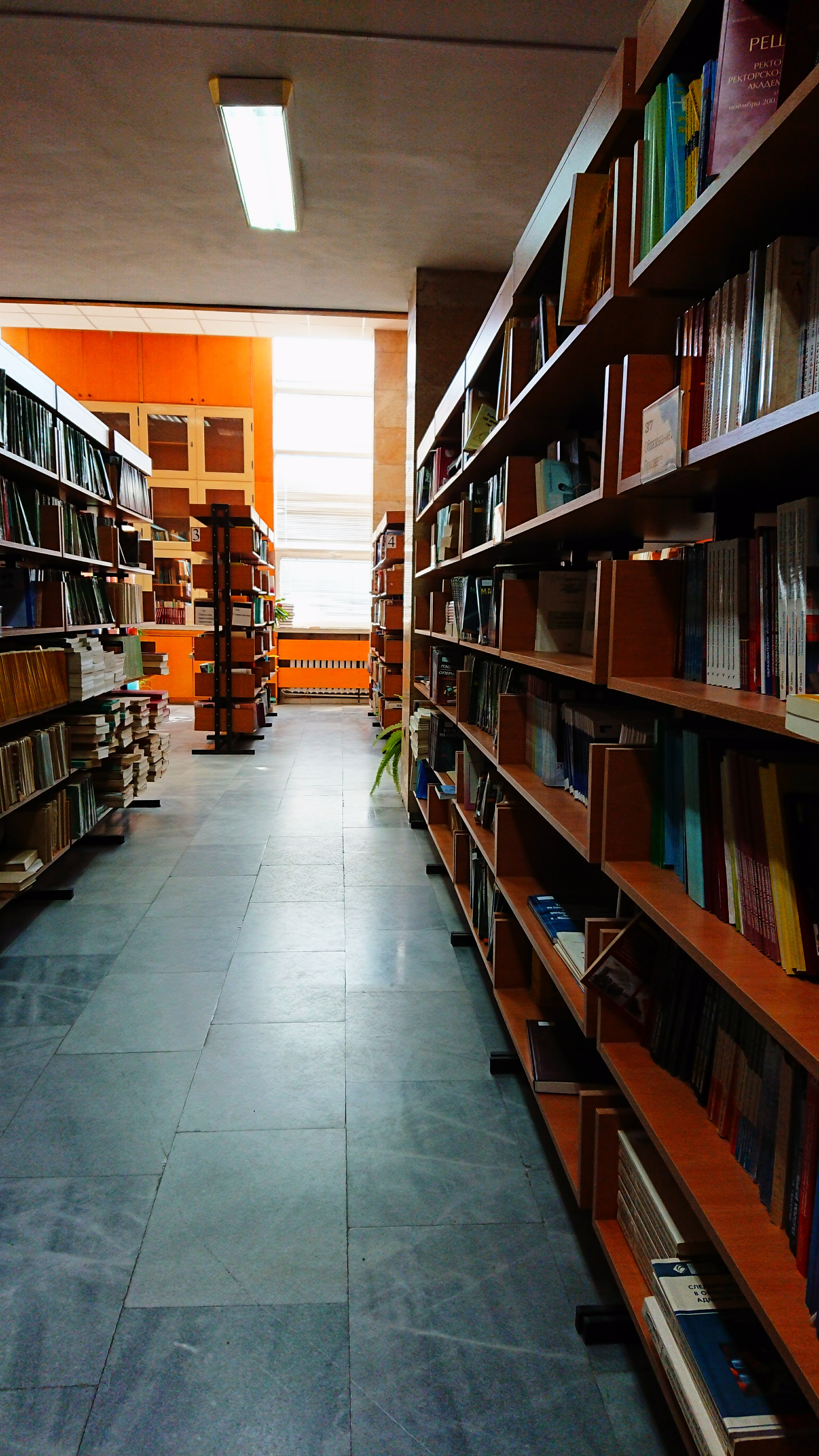
Library view

Traditionally, the highest number of applicants as well as a record number of A-students study at UNWE in comparison to other universities in the country. Since 2007, a unified exam (test) similar to the SAT test is used for admission to the university. Since 2008, it is also used for the professional fields.

The university ranks second in Bulgaria and exhibits a high rate of employment after graduation. State and private employers adopt UNWE as synonymous with the training and professionalism of its graduates. Only in the recent few years among its graduates there are four prime ministers, vice prime ministers, ministers, a president of the National Assembly, many deputies, a President of the National Audit Office, a chief prosecutor, a lot of bankers, businessmen and many others.

== Academic profile ==
Under regular and distance form of education are trained more than 20,000 students at UNWE. There are 39 majors for bachelor's degree (in four of them – Economics, International Economic Relationships, Finance and Accounting, Business Informatics – the education is only in English) as well as over 40 graduate programmes.

The university has been awarded the Certificate of quality in education according to ISO 9001:2000.

UNWE is the coordinating university for Bulgaria in the Central European initiative for inter-university relationships and it is in collaboration with over 100 universities in Europe, the US and Asia.

The implemented credit system allows foreign students at UNWE to earn credits at the university, as well as current students at UNWE to graduate from foreign universities with a diploma.

The university issues an almanac, a yearbook and Scientific Works, the scientific magazine Economic Alternatives and the UNWE newspaper. The material facilities have been completely renovated in the recent years.

== Campus ==
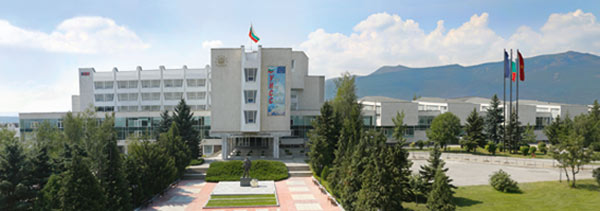
Panorama of the University of National and World Economy

The building of UNWE is a 41 thousand square metres built up area and there are 120 auditoriums, a lot of computer rooms, offices, laboratories, 367 study rooms, a modern library with 100 computer workstations and free Internet access, a ceremonial hall, some modern conference rooms, an electronic system of information services for students, a publishing house, a printing house, a bookshop, a website, a sports centre, dormitories for nearly 5000 students, health – educational facility in Ravda and many others. UNWE has 8 faculties and 32 departments.

== Notable alumni ==
Throughout its history, a sizeable number of UNWE alumni, have become notable in many varied fields, both academic and otherwise. Six Bulgarian Prime Ministers are graduates of the University of National and World Economy after the changes in 1989, including Prof. Lyuben Berov, Reneta Indzhova – the only female prime minister in Bulgarian history, Plamen Oresharski etc. Only in the last few governments of Bulgaria more than half of the cabinet ministers graduated from the University of National and World Economy. Since 1938, out of 23 Bulgarian Finance Ministers, only 5 of them have been persons who have not graduated or taught at UNWE.

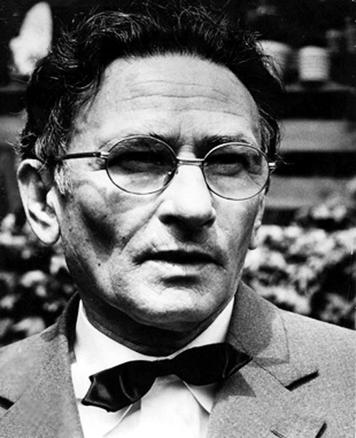
Emiliyan Stanev, Bulgarian writer

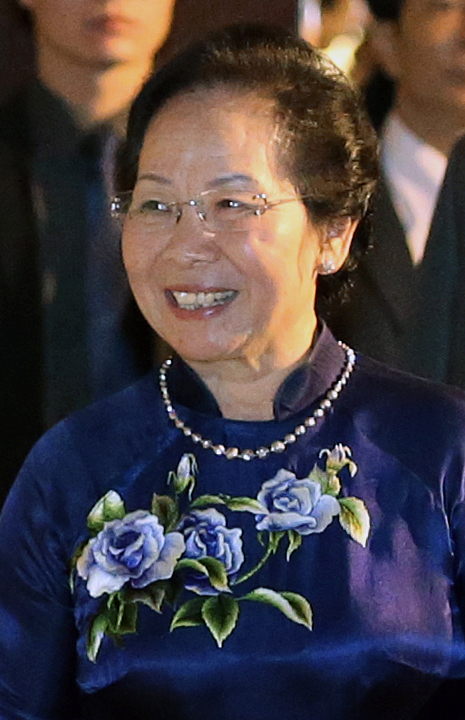
Nguyễn Thị Doan, politician, former vice president of Vietnam

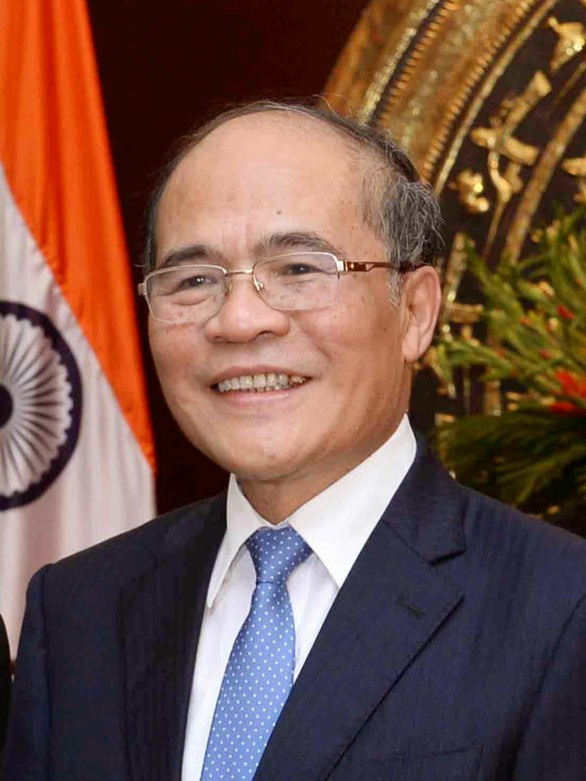
Nguyễn Sinh Hùng, former chairman of the National Assembly of Vietnam.

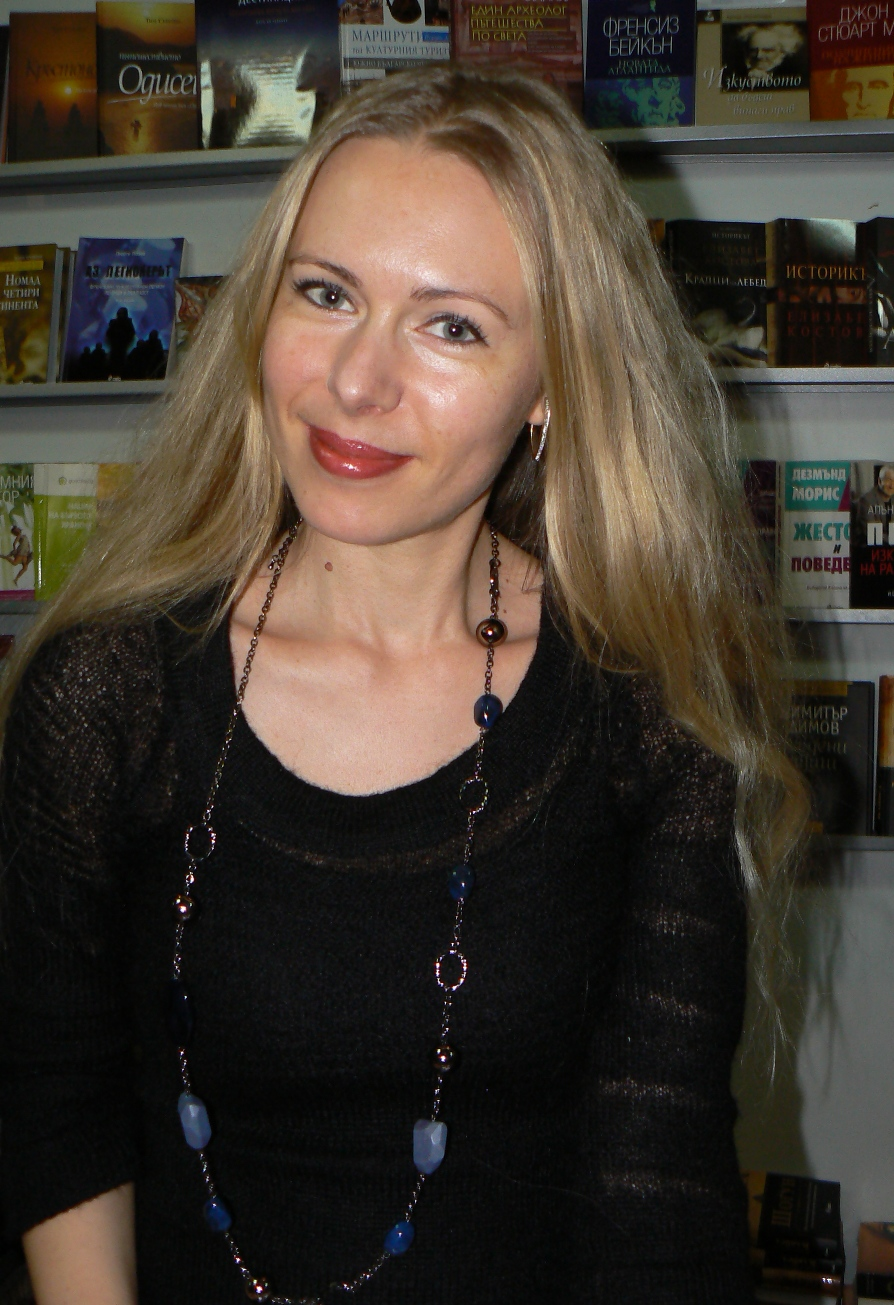
Lyudmila Filipova, novelist and journalist

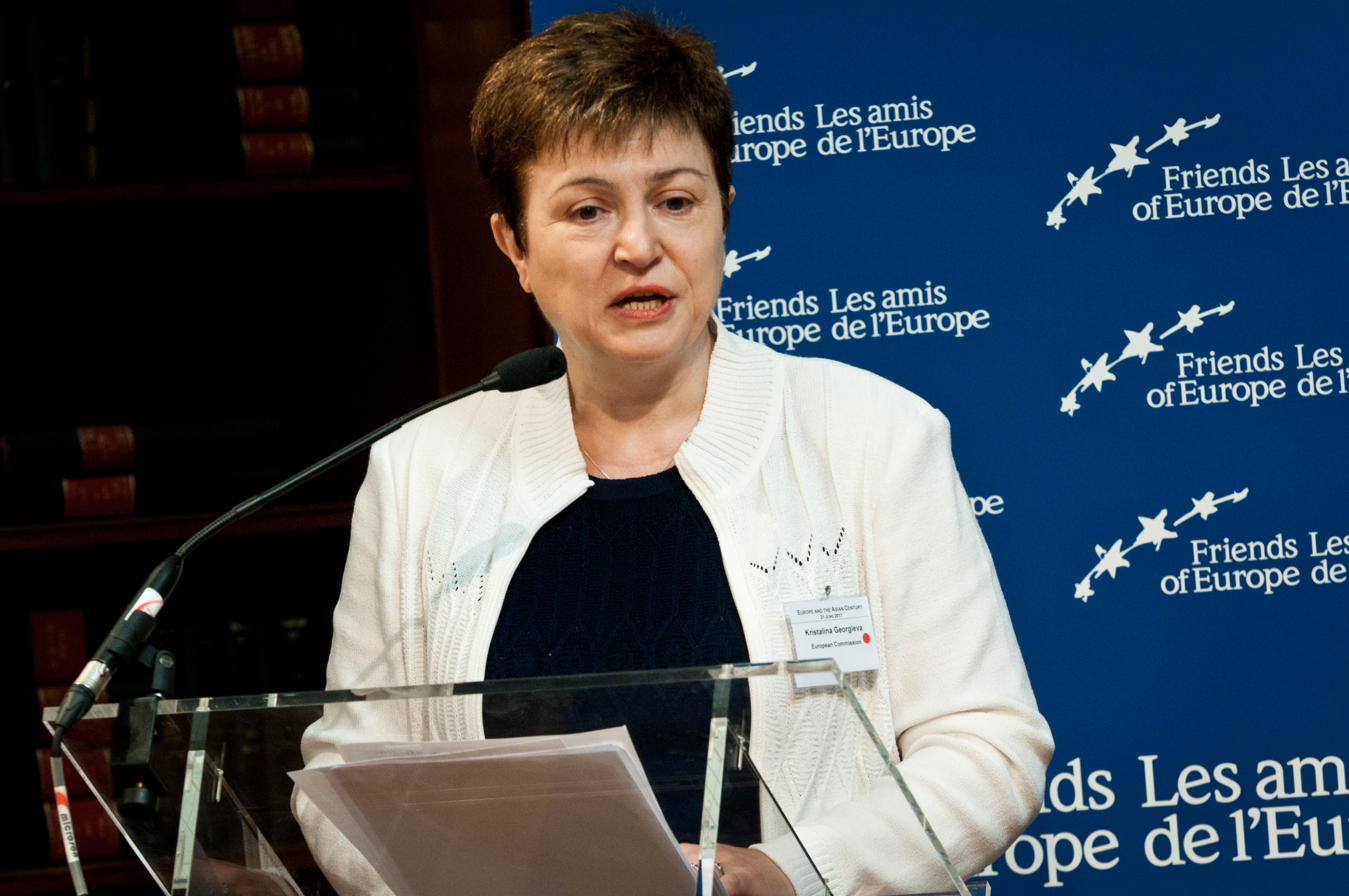
Kristalina Georgieva, economist - current managing director of the International Monetary Fund

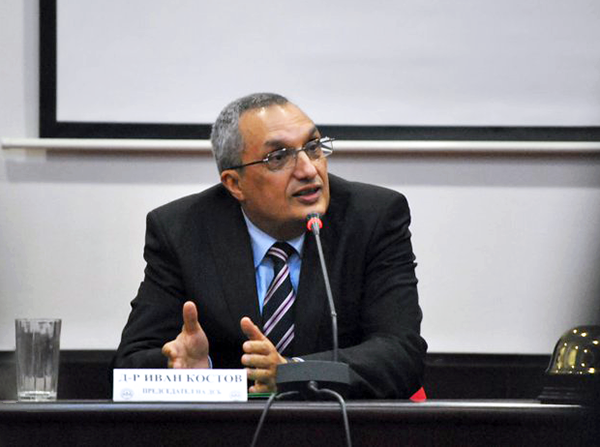
Ivan Kostov, former prime minister of Bulgaria

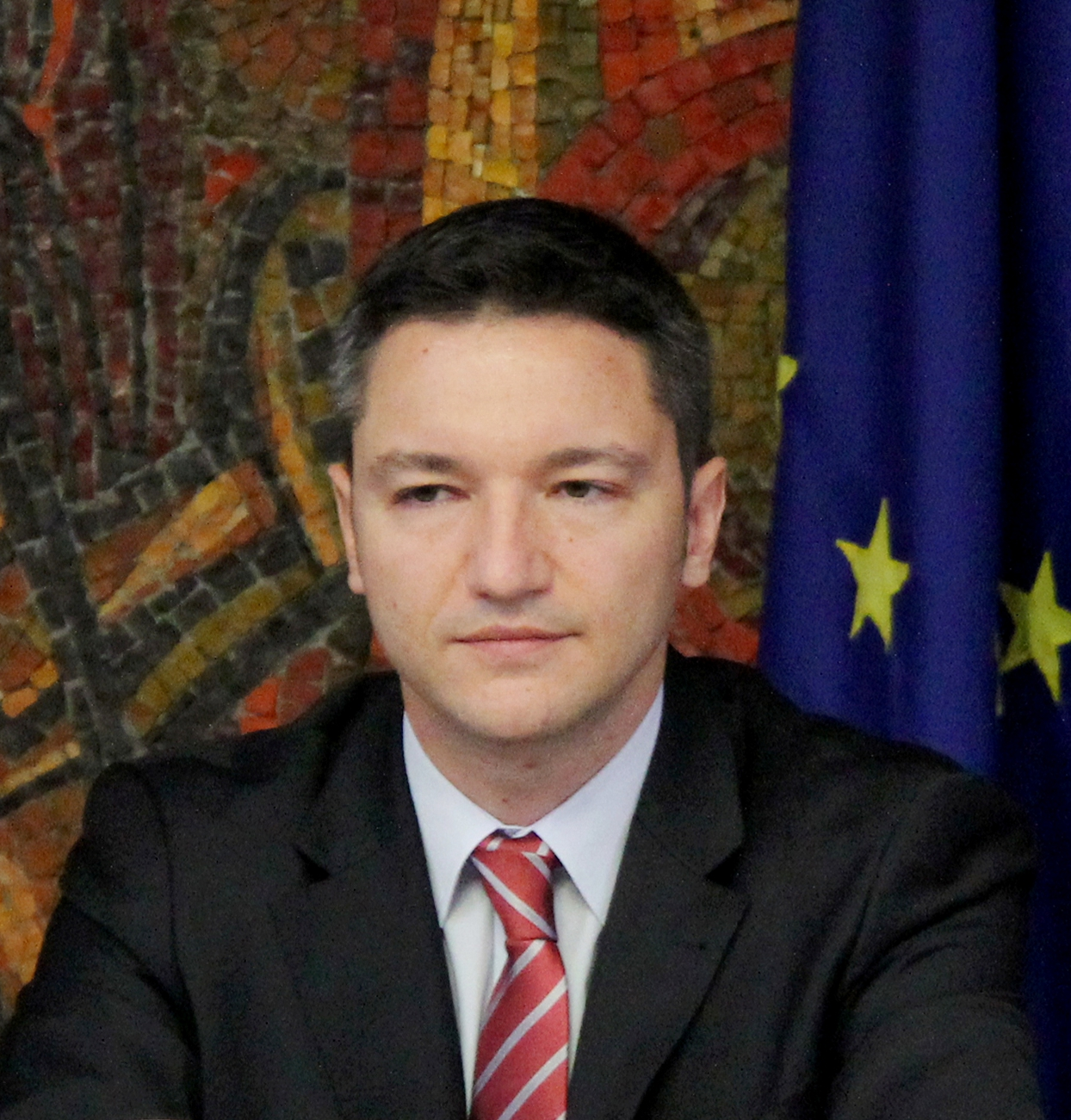
Kristian Vigenin, former Minister of Foreign Affairs of Bulgaria

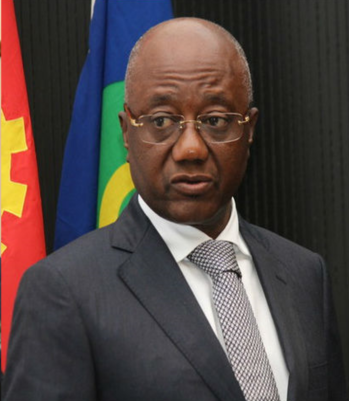
Pedro Luís da Fonseca, Minister of economy of Angola

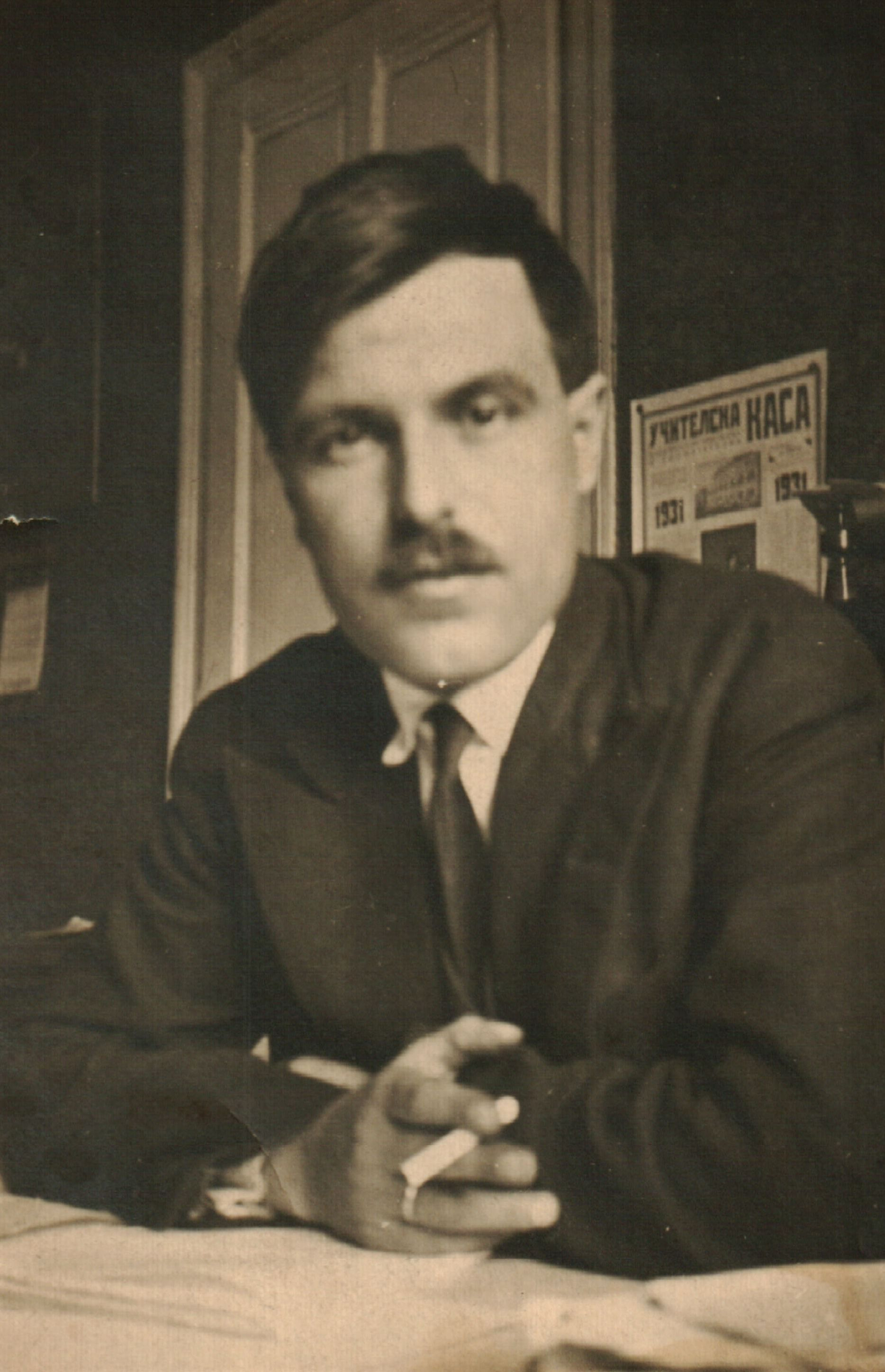
Angel Karaliychev, Bulgarian writer

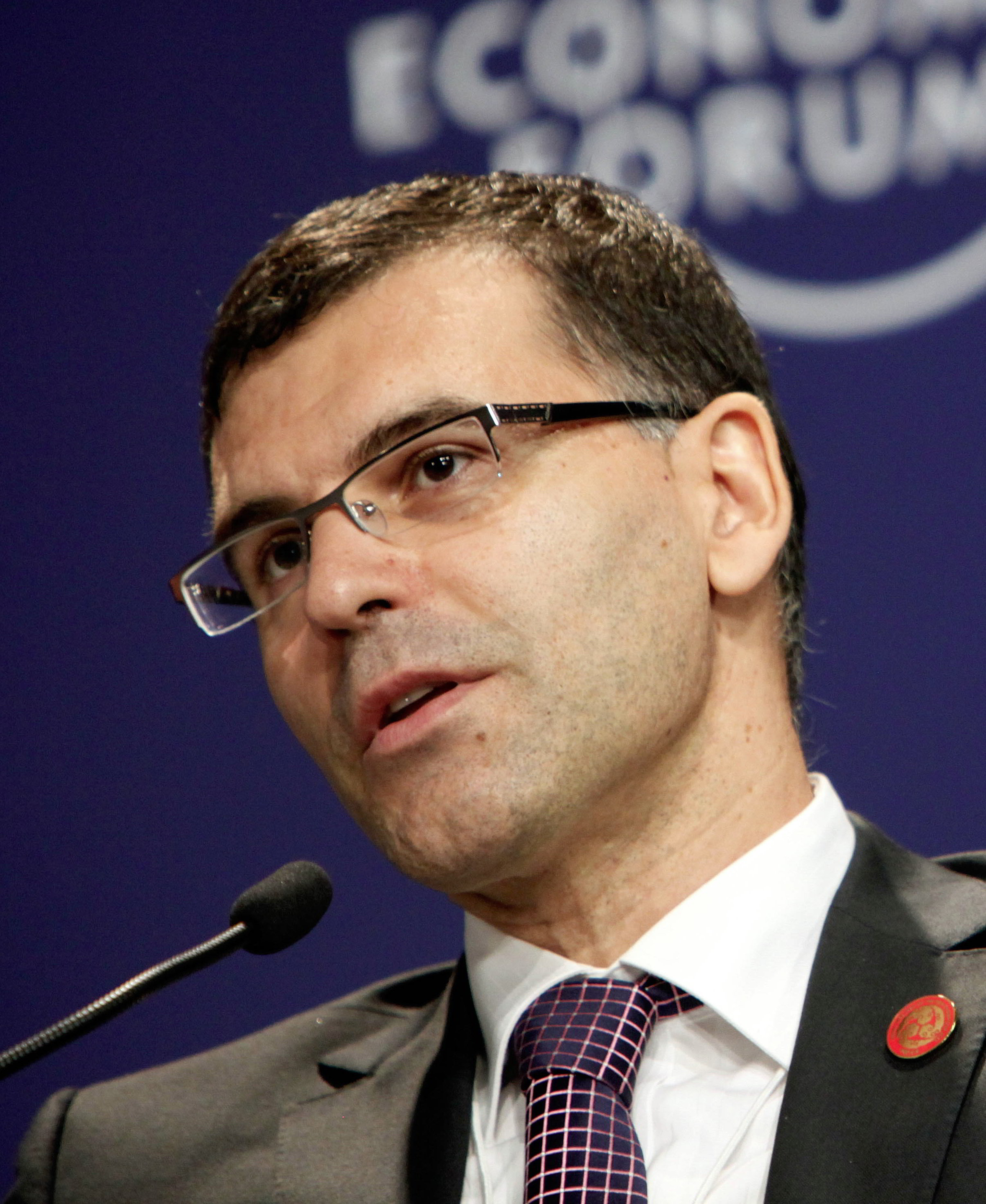
Simeon Djankov, former Minister of Finance in Bulgaria

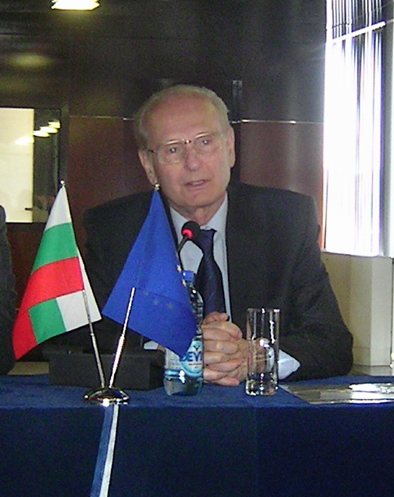
Nedelcho Beronov, Bulgarian jurist and Constitutional Court chairman

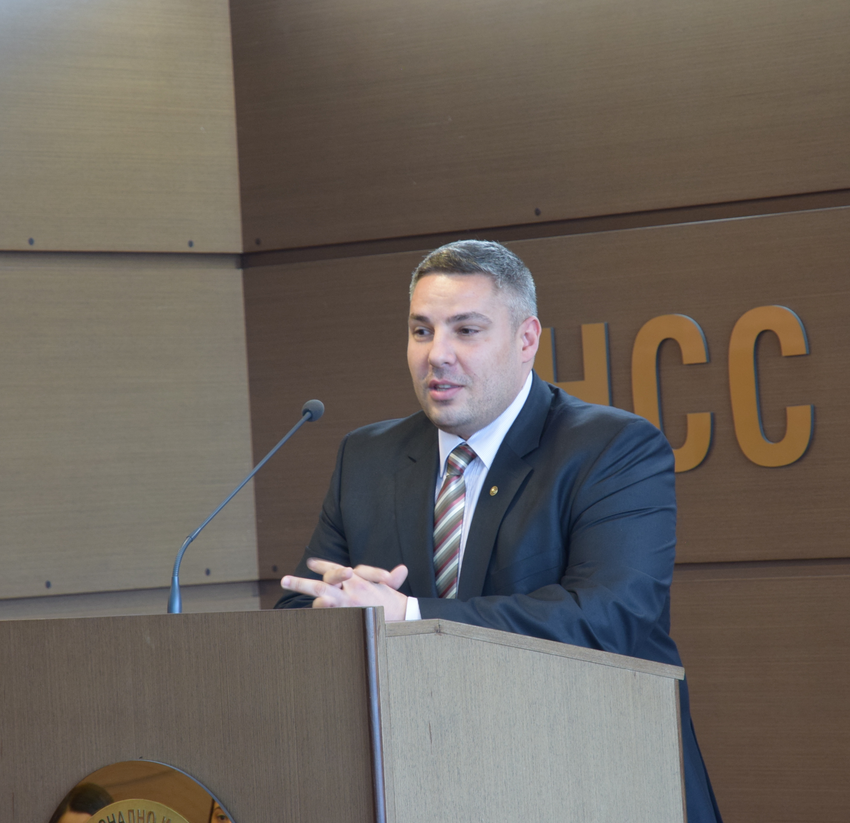
Metodi Lalouv, Bulgarian jurist and judge

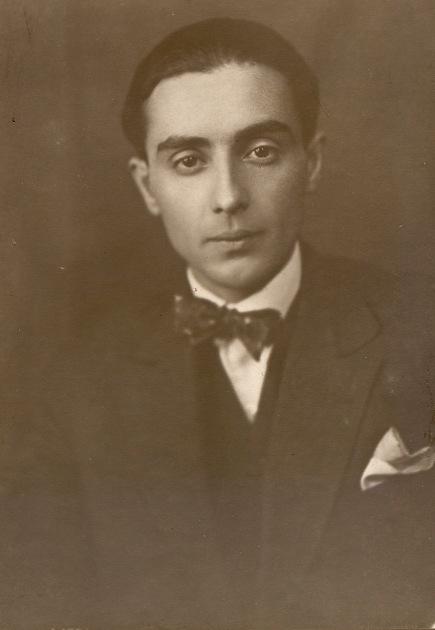
Vladimir Polyanov, Bulgarian writer
