= List of political parties in Angola =

The Popular Movement for the Liberation of Angola (MPLA) has ruled Angola since independence in 1975. From 1975 to 1991, it was the sole legally existing party in a political system inspired by the model then practised by the socialist countries of Eastern Europe. Since 1991/1992, a multiparty system exists, where the MPLA has been dominant because of the majority it won in the 1992 parliamentary and presidential elections. In the latter, it failed to obtain the required absolute majority for its candidate, José Eduardo dos Santos, and according to the constitution, a second round would have been necessary. The outbreak of the Angolan Civil War made this impossible, and José Eduardo dos Santos exercised presidential functions without a legal basis. For the same reason, the regular parliamentary elections stipulated by the constitution did not take place, and the parliament elected in 1992 remained in place for 16 years. While large sections of the interior were for years controlled by the armed forces of the rival movement National Union for the Total Independence of Angola (UNITA) under the leadership of Jonas Savimbi, UNITA's elected MPs were a regular part of the parliament, and for some years a government of national unity, led by the MPLA, also included members from the UNITA as well as from the National Liberation Front of Angola (FNLA), the third movement that had fought the independence war against Portuguese colonial rule.

In total, in 1992 as well as in 2008, the year of the second parliamentary elections, there were more than 120 registered political parties; only a handful had national constituencies, and only a few of them succeeded in having MPs elected for the National Assembly; see Elections in Angola. After any parliamentary elections, all parties that had not succeeded in receiving at least 0,5% of the votes were by law considered as automatically dissolved. Most of them become effectively defunct, while others re-emerge under different names.

== Current parties ==
=== Parties represented in the National Assembly ===
Party		Founded	Leader	MPs	Political position	Ideology
MPLA	Popular Movement for the Liberation of Angola; Movimento Popular de Libertação de Angola	1956	João Lourenço	124 / 220	Centre-left to left-wing	Social democracy; Communism; Democratic socialism; Left-wing nationalism
UNITA	National Union for the Total Independence of Angola; União Nacional para a Independência Total de Angola	1966	Adalberto Costa Júnior	90 / 220	Centre-right to right-wing	Big tent; Conservatism; Anti-communism
PRS	Social Renewal Party; Partido de Renovação Social	1990	Eduardo Kuangana	2 / 220	Centre-left	Federalism; Progressivism
FNLA	National Liberation Front of Angola; Frente Nacional de Libertação de Angola	1961	Ngola Kabangu	2 / 220	Centre-right	Civic nationalism; Christian democracy; Conservatism
PHA	Humanist Party of Angola; Partido Humanista de Angola	2020	Florbela Malaquias	2 / 220	Centre-left	Universal humanism; Feminism

MPLA. UNITA, and FNLA are outcomes of the three nationalist movements that fought the anti-colonial war against Portugal, 1961 to 1974, and then fought each other in the civil war, 1975–2002. While the MPLA became a political party at independence, in 1975, the two others acquired this status in 1991, on the basis of the democratic constitution adopted at that stage. In the 1992 parliamentary elections, the MPLA obtained an absolute majority (53%), but the FNLA, and particularly UNITA, also conquered substantial numbers of seats—keeping the newly formed parties at a distance. However, in the 2008 elections the victory of the MPLA (82%) was overwhelming, so that UNITA (10%) was reduced to the category of a smaller party. Since then, the MPLA won a majority in every parliamentary election, however the majority got smaller with every single election. UNITA on the other hand has over the years risen in popularity and became the biggest opposition to MPLA. In the latest election in 2022 the MPLA (51%) won a majority once again, and UNITA (44%) has remained the second biggest party. All the other parties (PRS, FNLA, PHA) currently represented in parliament got around 1% of the votes.

=== Other parties ===
- Angolan Democratic Forum (Fórum Democrático Angolano, FDA)
- Angolan National Democratic Party (Partido Nacional Democrático Angolano, PNDA)
- Broad Convergence for the Salvation of Angola – Electoral Coalition (Convergência Ampla de Salvação de Angola – Coligação Eleitoral, CASA-CE)
- Democratic Angola – Coalition (Aliança Democrática de Angola, ADA)
- Democratic Party for Progress – Angolan National Alliance (Partido Democrático para o Progresso/Aliança Nacional Angolana, PDP-ANA)
- Democratic Renewal Party (Partido Renovador Democrático, PRD)
- Liberal Democratic Party (Partido Liberal Democrático, PLD)
- National Patriotic Alliance (Aliança Patriótica Nacional, APN)
- Nationalist Party for Justice in Angola (Partido Nacionalista para a Justiça em Angola, P-NJANGO)
- New Democracy Electoral Union (Nova Democracia União Eleitoral ND-UE)
- Party of the Alliance of Youth, Workers and Farmers of Angola (Partido da Aliança da Juventude, Operários e Camponeses de Angola, PAJOCA)
- Social Democratic Party (Partido Social-Democrata, PSD)
- Revelation Party ("Partido da Revelação") (founded 7 July 2007 in London by Angolan young Christians and students)

== Defunct parties ==
- Angolan Communist Party (Partido Comunista Angolano)
- Angolan League (Liga Angolana)
- Communist Committee of Cabinda (Comité Communista de Cabinda)
- Communist Organization of Angola (Organização Comunista de Angola)
- Democratic Front for the Liberation of Angola (FDLA)
- Front for Democracy (Frente para a Democracia, FpD)
- Movement for the National Independence of Angola (Movimento para a Independência Nacional de Angola)
- Communist Organization of Angola (Organização dos Comunistas de Angola, OCA)
- Party of the United Struggle for Africans in Angola (Partido da Luta Unida dos Africanos de Angola)

NB: With the exception of FpD (now refunded as Democratic Forum), these were not organizations constituted as political parties in terms of the 1991 constitution, and thus did not take part in any elections since the first multi-party elections in 1992.

== See also ==
- Politics of Angola
- List of political parties by country
- Elections in Angola
