= List of Angolan flags =

This is a list of flags associated with Angola.

== National flag ==
Flag	Date	Use	Description
	1975–present	National flag of Angola	A horizontal bicolor of red above black with a yellow emblem in the center consisted of a five-pointed star within a half gear wheel crossed by a machete (resembling the hammer and sickle used on the Soviet flag).

== Standards of the head of state ==
Flag	Date	Use	Description
current
	1975–present	Standard of the President of Angola	
former
	?–1975	Flag of the Governor of Portuguese Angola	
	?–1975	Flag of the High Commissioner of Portuguese Angola	
	1510s–c. 1543	Banner of Manikongo Afonso I	

== Police ==
Flag	Date	Use	Description
current
	1975–present	Flag of the Angola National Police^{pt}	

== Penitentiary Service ==
Flag	Date	Use	Description
current
	?–present	Flag of the Angola Penitentiary Service	

== Olympic Committee ==
Flag	Date	Use	Description
current
	1979–present	Flag of the Angolan Olympic Committee	

== Historical flags ==
Flag	Date	Regime	Description
	1482–1485	Flag of the Kingdom of Portugal	
	1485–1495	Flag of the Kingdom of Portugal	
	1495–1521	Flag of the Kingdom of Portugal	
	1521–1578	Flag of the Kingdom of Portugal	
	1578–1640	Flag of the Kingdom of Portugal	
	c. 17th century	Flag of the Kingdom of Kongo according to Giovanni Cavazzi da Montecuccolo	
	c. 17th century	Flag of the Kingdom of Ndongo according to Giovanni Cavazzi da Montecuccolo	
	1616–1640	Flag of the Kingdom of Portugal (putative)	
	1640–1667	Flag of the Kingdom of Portugal	
	1641–1648	The Prince's Flag in the Dutch Republic	
	1667–1706	Flag of the Kingdom of Portugal	
	1706–1750	Flag of the Kingdom of Portugal	
	1826–1834	Flag of the Kingdom of Portugal	
	1750–1816	Flag of the Kingdom of Portugal	
	1816–1826	Flag of the Kingdom of Portugal	
	1834–1910	Flag of the Kingdom of Portugal	
	c. 1883	Royal Banner of the Kingdom of Kakongo	
	1910–1975	Flag of Portugal	

== Proposed flags ==
Flag	Date	Use	Origin	Description
	2003	Proposed flag of Angola	From "Catica", the submission 106 was chosen by the Constitutional Commission to be the new flag, but was never implemented.	Five horizontal stripes: the top and bottom stripes are blue, separated by thin white stripes from a broad red stripe in the middle. Centered on the red stripe is a yellow sun. The sun design in the middle is meant to be reminiscent of cave paintings found in Tchitundo-Hulu cave near Virei.
	1965	Proposed flag of the Portuguese overseas province of Angola	From heraldist Franz Paul de Almeira Langhans in his book "Armorial do Ultramar Português".	The Flag of Portugal defaced with the colony's lesser arms shield on its lower fly side.
	1932	Proposed flag of the Colony of Angola	From the Portuguese Institute of Heraldry (IPH), by Affonso Dornellas and João Ricardo da Silva, to the Agência Geral das Colónias (General Agency of the Colonies).	The flag is divided into four purple and yellow triangular sections radiating from the center. In the center of the flag is a shield with a golden pelican feeding its young in a purple field. The golden border of the shield contains five small blue shields with white dots and four red crosses of the Order of Christ. Above the shield is a mural crown and below the shield is a white scroll with the word "ANGOLA" written on it.

== Political flags ==
Flag	Date	Party	Description
current
	2020–present	Humanist Party of Angola	Party logo on a white background.
	2012–present	Broad Convergence for the Salvation of Angola – Electoral Coalition	Blue map of Angola surrounded by eighteen white stars on a green background. Angola is divided into eighteen provinces.
	2006–present	New Democracy Electoral Union	White ring on an orange background.
	1991–present	Democratic Party for Progress – Angolan National Alliance	Vertical tricolor of red, white, and green. In the middle band is a yellow disc held above and below by two rotationally symmetric black hands.
Link to file	1990–present	Democratic Renewal Party	A blue flag with the party logo, the logo consists of a handshake on a red disc background.
	1990–present	Social Renewal Party	Two horizontal bands of red and green with a black vertical band on the hoist side and white disc where the three colors meet.
	1966–present	National Union for the Total Independence of Angola	A horizontal triband consisting of a green central band sandwiched between two red bands. It is charged in the center with a black silhouette of a crowing rooster and towards the fly with a red silhouette of a rising sun with sixteen rays. Red represents the blood shed by Angolans in anti-colonial actions before the war of independence, while green represents hope and faith in victory. The rooster symbolises "a call upon the peoples of Africa to become aware of the foreign nomination of Africa". The rising sun represents the start of the war of independence and the unity of Angola's sixteen provinces in the war.
	1960–present	People's Movement for the Liberation of Angola	A horizontal bicolour consisting of a red upper band and a black lower band, charged in the center with a yellow five-pointed star. The symbolism of the colours is the same as that of the Angolan flag. American vexillologist Whitney Smith suggests that the design may have been derived from the flag of the Viet Cong, from which the MPLA adopted strategies and principles.
	1954–present	National Liberation Front of Angola	A diagonal tricolour of white, red, and yellow with white star in the center. The red band spans from the lower hoist to the upper fly.
Youth wings
	1974–present	Revolutionary United Youth of Angola	Emblem on a red background.
	1962–present	Youth of MPLA	A horizontal tricolour of red, blue, and black with a yellow rising sun on the middle stripe.
former
	1994–2013	Republican Party of Angola	Two versions of a flag consisting of thirteen horizontal stripes, alternating white and red, with an emblem similar to the U.S. seal surrounded by eighteen blue stars. In its right talon the eagle holds a hammer and a compass.
Link to file	1992–2013	Democratic Angola – Coalition	White flag with a rose flower with a stem.
	1990s–2013	Angolan National Democratic Party	Horizontal bicolor of green above black. Centered on the flag is a yellow disc, upon which is placed a white five-pointed star. On the star there is a white dove in flight.
	1990s	Angolan Democratic Forum	A horizontal tricolour of blue, white, and green.
	1988–2013	Social Democratic Party	
	1983–2013	Liberal Democratic Party	

=== Separatists ===
Flag	Date	Party	Description
	c. 1975–present	Front for the Liberation of the Enclave of Cabinda	
	1990s–present	Front for the Liberation of the Enclave of Cabinda-Renovada	
	1996–present	Liberation Front of the State of Cabinda	Horizontal tricolour of blue, copper, and black; the symbol in the middle is a padrão commemorating the Treaty of Simulambuco.
	?–present	Cabinda Free State	A horizontal tricolour of copper, white, and black.

== Ethnic groups flags ==
Flag	Date	Use	Description
		Flag of the Lunda-Tchokwé people	
		Flag of the Kongo people	
		Flags of the Mbunda Kingdom	A white flag with a drawing of an African elephant.

== Red Cross Society ==
Flag	Date	Use	Description
	1978–present	Flag of the Angola Red Cross	Red Cross surrounded by the association's name.

== Yacht clubs ==
Burgee	Club
	Clube Náutico da Ilha de Luanda

== See also ==
- Flag of Angola
- Coat of arms of Angola
