= 1992 Angolan general election =

- 29–30 September 1992
- Presidential election
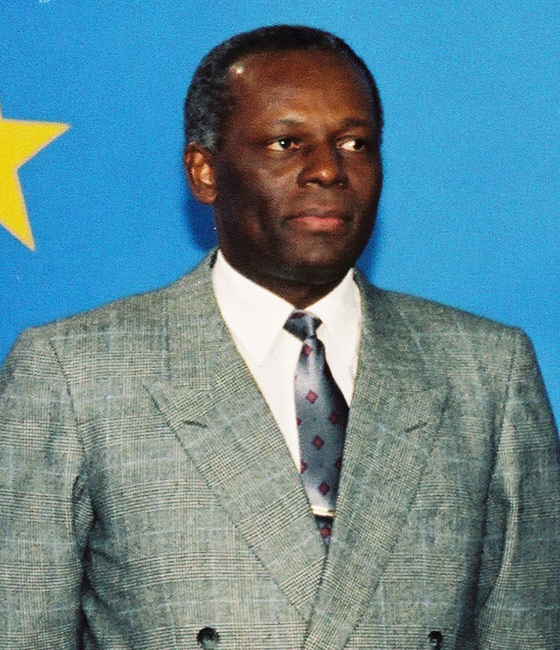

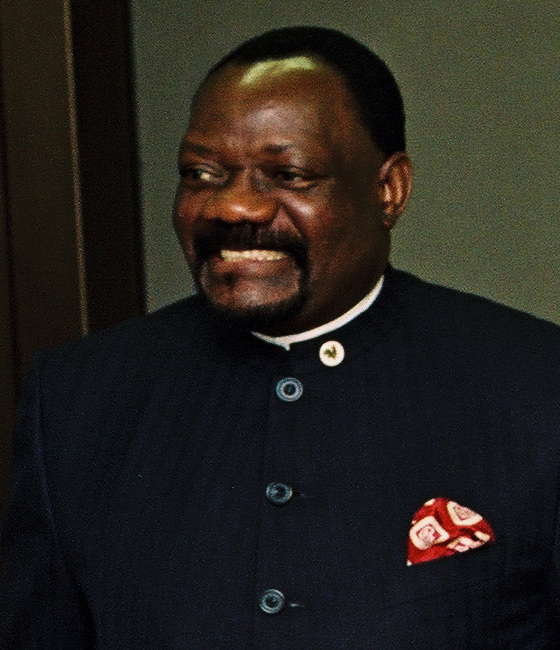
Nominee	José Eduardo dos Santos	Jonas Savimbi
Party	MPLA	UNITA
Popular vote	1,953,335	1,579,298
Percentage	49.56%	40.07%
- Most voted-for candidate by province
President before election
José Eduardo dos Santos
MPLA
Elected President
José Eduardo dos Santos
MPLA
- Parliamentary election
Party	Leader	Vote %	Seats
MPLA	José Eduardo dos Santos	53.74	129
UNITA	Jonas Savimbi	34.10	70
FNLA	Holden Roberto	2.40	5
PLD	Anália de Victória Pereira	2.39	3
PRS	Rui Pereira	2.27	6
PRD	Luís dos Passos	0.89	1
AD–Coligação	Simão Cacete	0.86	1
PSD	Bengui Pedro João	0.84	1
PAJOCA	Alexandre Sebastião André	0.35	1
FDA		0.30	1
PDP–ANA	Mfulumpinga Landu Victor	0.27	1
PNDA		0.26	1
This lists parties that won seats. See the complete results below.
Results by electoral district

General elections were held in Angola on 29 and 30 September 1992 to elect a President and National Assembly, the first time free and multi-party elections had been held in the country. They followed the signing of the Bicesse Accord on 31 May 1991 in an attempt to end the 17-year-long civil war. Voter turnout was 91.3% for the parliamentary election and 91.2% for the presidential election. The election was considered free and fair by election monitors.

The ruling People's Movement for the Liberation of Angola (MPLA) won both elections; however eight opposition parties, in particular the National Union for the Total Independence of Angola (UNITA), rejected the results, accusing it of being rigged. UNITA sent negotiators to the capital, but at the same time prepared measures to resume the civil war. As a consequence, hostilities erupted in Luanda and immediately spread to other parts of the country. Several thousand to tens of thousands of UNITA members or supporters were killed nationwide by MPLA forces in a few days, in what is known as the Halloween Massacre.

== Background ==
Angola was a colony of Portugal for more than 400 years from the 15th century. Demands for independence picked up momentum during the early 1950s, with the principal protagonists including the MPLA, founded in 1956, the National Front for the Liberation of Angola (FNLA), which appeared in 1961, and the UNITA, founded in 1966. After many years of conflict that weakened all of the insurgent parties, Angola gained independence on 11 November 1975, after the Carnation Revolution in Portugal, which overthrew the Portuguese regime headed by Marcelo Caetano.

A fight for dominance broke out immediately between the three nationalist movements. The events prompted a mass exodus of Portuguese citizens, creating up to 300,000 destitute Portuguese refugees—the retornados. The new Portuguese government attempted to mediate an understanding between the three competing movements, which they initially agreed to, but later failed and resulted in a devastating civil war which lasted several decades, claiming millions of lives and producing many refugees until ending in 2002.

During the civil war, the MPLA gained control of the capital Luanda and much of the rest of the country. With the support of the United States, Zaire and South Africa intervened militarily in favour of the FNLA and UNITA, with the intention of taking Luanda before the declaration of independence. In response, Cuba intervened in favour of the MPLA, which became a flash point for the Cold War. With Cuban support, the MPLA held Luanda and declared independence on 11 November 1975, with Agostinho Neto becoming the first president, though the civil war continued. Jose Eduardo dos Santos won the 1980 and 1986 elections and became the first elected President of the country. The civil war continued with UNITA fighting against the MPLA, with both parties receiving international support. There was a ceasefire agreement during 1989, with the leader of UNITA, Jonas Savimbi, but it collapsed soon afterwards. As a part of its peace efforts, the MPLA dropped its theme of Marxism–Leninism and moved to socialism. During May 1991, Dos Sambos and Savimbi signed a multiparty democracy agreement in Lisbon.

== Conduct ==
Voter registration was carried out between 20 May and 31 July and the National Electoral Council enrolled a total of 4,828,468 eligible voters. Campaigning was intense from two of the major parties; UNITA campaigned against the colonial influence of Portugal and proposed a native setup. The elections were monitored by 800 representatives of the UN Angola Verification Mission (UNAVEM).

== Results ==
Voter turnout was around 75 per cent voter, with the UN airlifting people in remote areas to the polling stations. Early counting indicated that MPLA was leading in most constituencies; UNITA immediately rejected the result and pulled out its forces out of the combined troops of the army and started preparing for a war. The National Electoral Council delayed announcing the results beyond the eight-day limit prescribed and announced the results on 17 October 1992.

=== President ===
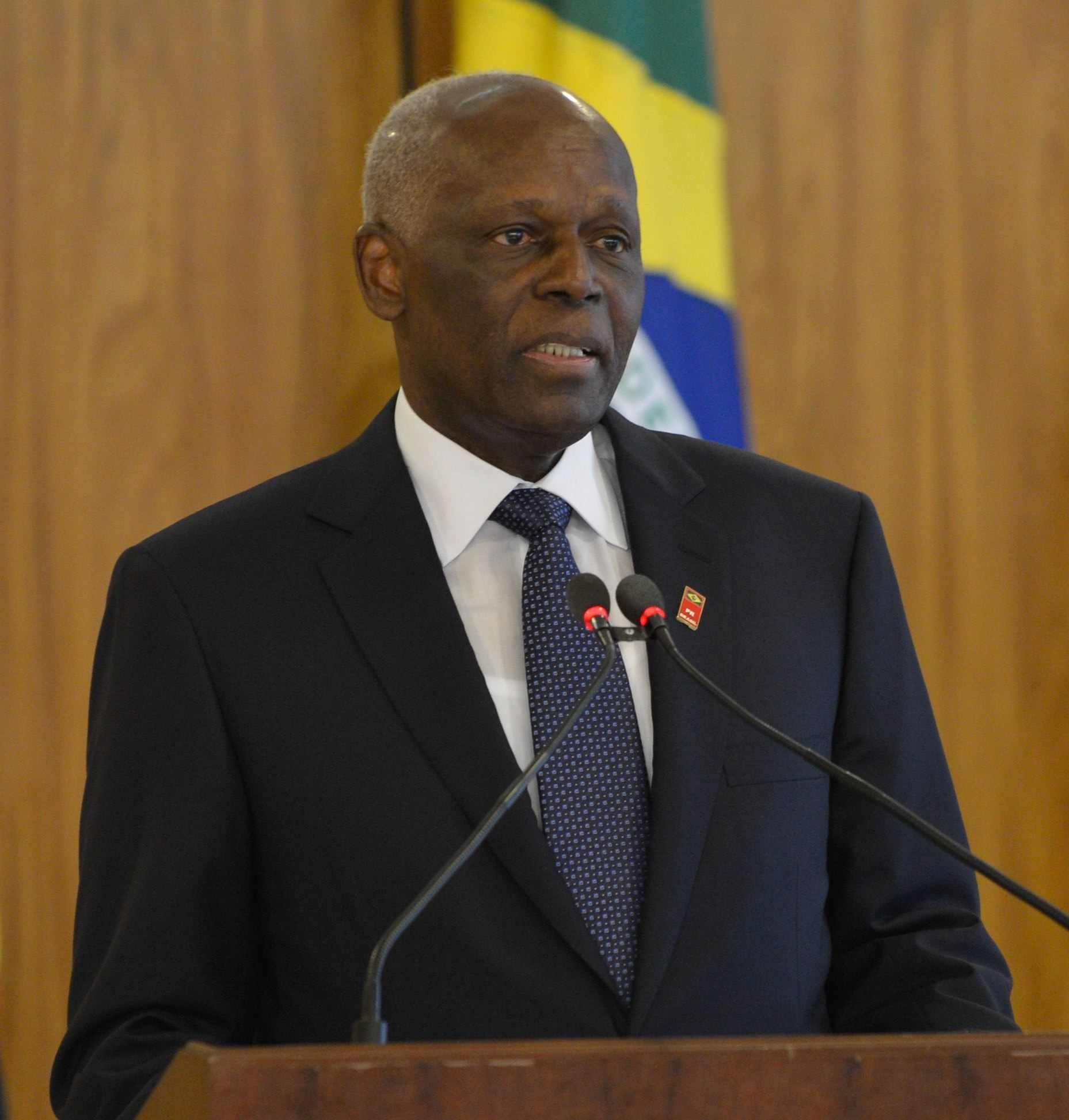
José Eduardo dos Santos who won and became the President of Angola in the elections

Candidate	Party	Votes	%
José Eduardo dos Santos	MPLA	1,953,335	49.56
Jonas Savimbi	UNITA	1,579,298	40.07
António Alberto Neto	Angolan Democratic Party	85,249	2.16
Holden Roberto	National Liberation Front	83,135	2.11
Honorato Lando	Liberal Democratic Party of Angola	75,789	1.92
Luís dos Passos	Democratic Renewal Party	58,121	1.47
Bengui Pedro João	Social Democratic Party	38,243	0.97
Simão Cacete	Front for Democracy	26,385	0.67
Daniel Chipenda	Independent	20,845	0.53
Anália de Victória Pereira	Liberal Democratic Party	11,475	0.29
Rui Pereira	Social Renewal Party	9,208	0.23
Total		3,941,083	100.00
Valid votes		3,941,083	89.54
Invalid/blank votes		460,455	10.46
Total votes		4,401,538	100.00
Registered voters/turnout		4,828,468	91.16
Source: African Elections Database

=== National Assembly ===
A total of 12 parties won seats, with the ruling MPLA winning nearly 54% of the total votes and 129 of the 220 seats, whilst UNITA won 70 seats. The first multi-party parliament session was convened on 26 October 1992 with all members of UNITA abstaining.

Party	Votes	%	Seats
MPLA	2,124,126	53.74	129
UNITA	1,347,636	34.10	70
National Liberation Front	94,742	2.40	5
Liberal Democratic Party	94,269	2.39	3
Social Renewal Party	89,875	2.27	6
Democratic Renewal Party	35,293	0.89	1
Democratic Angola – Coalition	34,166	0.86	1
Social Democratic Party	33,088	0.84	1
Party of the Alliance of Youth, Workers and Farmers of Angola	13,924	0.35	1
Angolan Democratic Forum	12,038	0.30	1
Democratic Party for Progress – Angolan National Alliance	10,608	0.27	1
Angolan National Democratic Party	10,281	0.26	1
National Democratic Convention of Angola	10,237	0.26	0
Social Democratic Party of Angola	10,217	0.26	0
Independent Angolan Party	9,007	0.23	0
Liberal Democratic Party of Angola	8,025	0.20	0
Angolan Democratic Party	8,014	0.20	0
Angolan Renewal Party	6,719	0.17	0
Total	3,952,265	100.00	220
Valid votes	3,952,265	89.61	
Invalid/blank votes	458,310	10.39	
Total votes	4,410,575	100.00	
Registered voters/turnout	4,828,468	91.35	
Source: African Elections Database

==== By province ====
Province	MPLA	UNITA	Other
Bengo	69.91%	17.61%	12.49%
Benguela	37.36%	53.58%	9.06%
Bié	13.75%	76.97%	9.29%
Cabinda	77.62%	16.09%	6.28%
Cunene	87.64%	4.58%	7.78%
Huambo	15.52%	73.40%	11.08%
Huila	63.73%	25.97%	10.30%
Cuando Cubango	21.75%	71.54%	6.71%
Cuanza Norte	86.26%	5.62%	8.12%
Cuanza Sul	71.90%	19.96%	8.14%
Luanda	70.66%	18.75%	10.59%
Lunda Norte	65.52%	7.46%	27.02%
Lunda Sul	53.81%	3.87%	42.32%
Malanje	78.04%	11.00%	10.96%
Moxico	58.49%	24.06%	17.46%
Namibe	66.65%	24.14%	9.21%
Uíge	51.88%	30.20%	17.92%
Zaire	31.66%	25.58%	42.75%
Source: Constituency-Level Election Archive

== Aftermath ==
The ruling MPLA won both elections, but the eight opposition parties, in particular UNITA, rejected the results as rigged. An official observer wrote that there was little UN supervision, that 500,000 UNITA voters were disenfranchised and that there were 100 clandestine polling stations. UNITA sent negotiators to the capital, but at the same time prepared measures to resume the civil war. As a consequence, hostilities erupted in Luanda and immediately spread to other parts of the country. Several thousand to tens of thousands of UNITA members or supporters were killed nationwide by MPLA forces in a few days, in what is known as the Halloween Massacre. War resumed immediately.

According to the constitution adopted in 1992, since dos Santos failed to win 50 percent of the vote, he would have faced Savimbi in a runoff election. However, Savimbi refused to take part in the runoff, saying the election had neither been free nor fair. Due to the resumption of the Civil War, the second round never took place, and dos Santos continued as President, even without the constitutionally-necessary democratic legitimisation. Dos Santos assumed office for the third continuous term as President on 2 December 1992 and appointed Marcolino Moco as the new Prime Minister of Angola. Most of the ministries were given to MPLA, while UNITA was offered six portfolios, which was accepted only later. There were four other portfolios allocated to other parties.
