= 2008 Angolan parliamentary election =

- 5–6 September 2008
- All 220 seats in the National Assembly; 111 seats needed for a majority
- Turnout: 87.36% (▼3.99 pp)
Party	Leader	Vote %	Seats	+/–
MPLA	José Eduardo dos Santos	81.64	191	+62
UNITA	Isaías Samakuva	10.39	16	−54
PRS	Eduardo Kuangana	3.17	8	+2
NDUE	Quintino de Moreira	1.20	2	New
FNLA	Ngola Kabangu	1.11	3	−2
This lists parties that won seats. See the complete results below.

President before	President after
José Eduardo dos Santos; MPLA	José Eduardo dos Santos; MPLA

Parliamentary elections were held in Angola on 5 and 6 September 2008, as announced by President José Eduardo dos Santos on 27 December 2007. They were the first since the 1992 general elections, which had led to the outbreak of the second phase of the Angolan Civil War, which continued until 2002.

The results showed the ruling People's Movement for the Liberation of Angola (MPLA) winning 82% of the vote and 191 of 220 seats in the Parliament of Angola. The main opposition UNITA (National Union for the Total Independence of Angola) won 10%. The international response was mixed, with the European Commission, the United States and the Southern African Development Community praising the elections as generally fair, while Human Rights Watch has questioned the legitimacy of this result. UNITA accepted the MPLA's victory.

== Background ==
Voter registration was to take place in late 2006 and through 2007. It was originally meant to be held in 1997, but was postponed numerous times due to organizational and logistical problems. In early August 2007, one month before the end of the registration period, more than seven million voters had already registered for the election. Over eight million were registered by August 2008.

== Campaign ==
=== Parties and candidates ===
The names of the candidates and parties contesting the election were to be announced on 22 July 2008.

Of the 34 lists who filed to contest the election, the following ten parties and four coalitions were accepted: the ruling MPLA, the leading opposition parties UNITA, National Liberation Front of Angola (FNLA) and Social Renewal Party (PRS), as well as the Democratic Renewal Party (PRD), the Liberal Democratic Party (PLD), Party of the Alliance of Youth, Workers and Farmers of Angola (PAJOCA), Party for Democratic Support and Progress of Angola (PADEPA), the Democratic Party for Progress - Angolan National Alliance (PDP-ANA), the Front for Democracy (FpD) and four coalitions: the Democratic Angola – Coalition (AD), New Democracy Electoral Union (ND), the Electoral Political Platform (PPE) and the Angolan Fraternal Forum Coalition (FOFAC).

The Angolan Democratic Party (PDA), the Social Democratic Party (PSD) and the Republican Party of Angola (PREA) were turned down, as were PSA, Angolan National Democratic Party, PACIA, UNDA, MPR/SN, PDUNA, PDPA - NTO BAKO and PSPA.

5,198 candidates are standing in the election.

Dos Santos said that the election would "be exemplary to the world", while UNITA leader Isaias Samakuva said that it would not be followed by a crisis, as occurred in the aftermath of the 2007 Kenyan election and the 2008 Zimbabwean election.

=== Campaigning ===
Campaigning began on 5 August 2008. The parties were each allowed five minutes on television and ten minutes on the radio per day for campaigning purposes. There were also programmes on television, each lasting an hour, that were devoted to discussing the government's accomplishments in a positive light; UNITA leader Isaias Samakuva described this as "shocking", while expressing confidence that the people would not believe these programmes. Prior to the start of the campaign period, MPLA posters and symbols were already plentiful in major cities. The MPLA emphasizes its work in rebuilding and developing the country following the end of the civil war in 2002, and the party was perceived as having a very strong institutional advantage. It was widely expected to win the election. UNITA concentrated its campaign in rural areas, while the remaining parties tended to conduct their small-scale campaigns, which were characterized by festive gatherings, in Luanda, the capital.

The UNITA campaign stressed the party's claims that the MPLA government had made insufficient progress in rebuilding the country following the end of the civil war and had failed to alleviate poverty. UNITA alleged that the campaign occurred in "a climate of threats, intimidation and violence", that four of the party's supporters were killed, and that some parts of the country were effectively MPLA "fiefdoms" where campaigning by other parties was impossible.

According to Radio Ecclesia, 13 people were arrested on 11 August for allegedly holding an unauthorized rally and causing traffic disruption while campaigning for UNITA in Rangel, near Luanda. On 13 August, campaigning members of UNITA were attacked by over 100 MPLA supporters at Londuimbali in Huambo Province, according to UNITA official Alcides Sakala; he said that the MPLA supporters were armed with "machetes, stones and sticks". The clash was reportedly broken up by police firing into the air.

Each party was planned to receive about one million dollars from the government for campaign purposes. Opposition parties said that they had not received any money by early August, and Front for Democracy leader Filomeno Vieira Lopes expressed concern that the money might not be distributed until after the election was held, as was the case for the 1992 election. The PDP-ANA complained that the amount was too small, describing it as a "laughable" sum. The PLD also said that the amount was insufficient. Furthermore, according to PLD President Analia Victoria Pereira, the MPLA had full access to the resources of the government and military to assist in its campaign. The parties eventually received the campaign money that was promised, although they protested that it came late due to procedural delays. Wary of such interference or disruption due to MPLA institutional influence, most of the parties chose to print materials for the election in South Africa rather than Angola.

At a rally on 22 August, dos Santos said that the election marked "a new era for democracy".

== Conduct ==
=== Observers and assessments of the election ===
The African Union was invited to send observers. The European Union also sent a team of 90 observers.

In a report on 13 August, Human Rights Watch—which sent missions to Luanda and four provinces—said that campaigning was not occurring in an atmosphere "free from intimidation or pressure", and it predicted that the election would not be free and fair if the process continued along the same course. The report stressed the need "to safeguard freedom of assembly and expression and access to the media by all stakeholders, and to establish an impartial national electoral body"; it also said that the government had not "provided adequate security to political parties" and was failing "to ensure political tolerance and full participation of citizens." Prime Minister Fernando Dias Dos Santos responded to the report on the same day with an assurance that the election would be "free, fair and transparent". MPLA spokesman Norberto dos Santos also replied to the report on 14 August, saying that it was "offensive and has no basis of truth". He accused Human Rights Watch of interfering in the election and Angola's internal affairs.

Dan Mozena, the United States Ambassador to Angola, said in an interview with Radio Ecclesia on 28 August that the US would send 40 observers for the election. He said that expectations for the election were high and spoke approvingly of the conduct of the electoral process up to that point; according to Mozena, the election had the "potential to be a model for the coming elections in Africa if all the actors continue to play their part".

Human Rights Watch released another statement in early September, expressing doubt that the election would be fair. According to the statement, the MPLA benefited from "state funding and media coverage", while the other parties received their allotted campaign money late. The statement also said that Human Rights Watch had "documented ... intimidation of the opposition and media, interference in the electoral commission, and violent incidents against the opposition" in the period prior to the start of campaigning. Human Rights Watch's Africa director, Georgette Gagnon, accused the government of being "more concerned with keeping the MPLA's grip on power than with moving towards genuine political accountability by giving Angolans a real chance to choose their government."

The head of the EU mission called the polls "a disaster" early in the first day of voting, stating that of the three voting stations in Luanda they had visited, none had been prepared for voters, they lacked voting lists, and voting had not started yet at any of them. However, it appeared that the problems were concentrated in Luanda only. The EU observers later stated that bribes and intimidation were widespread.

The Southern African Development Community (SADC) observation commission (80 observers were sent) considered the poll "credible, peaceful and transparent". Luisa Morgantini, the head of the EU observer mission, said at a press conference on 8 September that the organization of the election was poor, although she remarked positively on voters' behavior. She declined to say whether she thought the election was free and fair on the grounds that such a classification was vague. The Pan-African Parliament observer mission gave only half-hearted approval of the election, saying that voter education was inadequate and suggesting that the media was dominated by the MPLA. José Manuel Barroso, the President of the European Commission, gave an essentially positive assessment, describing the election as "a step towards the consolidation of a multiparty democracy, a fundamental element for peace, stability, and socio-economic development".

=== Election day ===
On election day, 5 September, the necessary material and equipment for voting was unavailable at some polling stations, particularly in Luanda; registration lists were absent at some polling stations, and some polling stations failed to open or opened late. The first hours of voting were described as "chaotic". Criticizing the problems, UNITA leader Samakuva and PDP-ANA leader Sindiangani Mbimbi said that the election should be canceled and held over again. According to Samakuva, some of his party's delegates had "received false credentials, or were given wrong addresses of non-existent polling stations", and he said that there was widespread confusion in Luanda; meanwhile, Mbimbi condemned the election as "political theatre". As a result of the problems, the electoral commission announced that 320 polling stations would open again on 6 September; however, it also asserted that the election had proceeded properly at most polling stations. The election reportedly became more orderly and functional in Luanda later in the day on 5 September, and most of the country reportedly avoided the problems that plagued the vote in Luanda.

In an interview with a South African radio station on 8 September, Samakuva alleged that some people were told and even forced to vote for the MPLA.

== Results ==
With nearly half the vote counted on 7 September, the MPLA held a strong lead with 81.65% with UNITA at 10.59%. Opposition parties strongly criticised the result and stated they were unlikely to accept the legality of the election. UNITA leader Samakuva said on 7 September that "the final result might not fully reflect the will" of the people, but also said that the election marked "an important step towards consolidation of our democracy". UNITA spokesman Adalberto da Costa initially said that the party would legally challenge the election before the Constitutional Court, arguing that the necessary conditions for the election were absent in Luanda. By 8 September, about 80% of the votes had been counted, and the results continued to show the MPLA with over 80% of the vote. On the same day, the Electoral Commission said that the election would not be held over again, rejecting the opposition demands. Samakuva announced at a news conference on the night of 8 September that UNITA accepted the MPLA's election victory, and he urged the MPLA "to govern in the interest of all Angolans".

Full provisional results, accounting for all normal votes (about 85% of the vote) were released on 9 September, showing the MPLA with 81.76% of the vote, while UNITA won 10.36%. The 15% of the results not included in the total were votes from citizens who did not vote within their area of registration, as well as unclear votes. Final results were released by the National Electoral Commission on 16 September, showing the MPLA with 81.64% of the vote (191 seats) and UNITA with 10.39% (16 seats), the PRS with 3.17% (eight seats), the ND with 1.20% (two seats), and the FNLA with 1.11% (three seats). Voter turnout was placed at 87.36% (7,213,281 votes), and 89.42% of the votes (6,450,407) were deemed valid. The MPLA won majorities in every province. Its best performance was in Cuanza Norte, where it won 94.64% of the vote; its worst performance was in Lunda Sul, where it won 50.54% against 41.74% for the PRS. UNITA's best performance was in Cabinda, where it received 31.37%. In Luanda, the most populous province (1,837,865 valid votes), the MPLA won 78.79% against 14.06% for UNITA.

Graph of the party split among 220 seats.
Party	Votes	%	Seats	+/–
MPLA	5,266,216	81.64	191	+62
UNITA	670,363	10.39	16	–54
Social Renewal Party	204,746	3.17	8	+2
New Democracy Electoral Union	77,141	1.20	2	New
National Liberation Front of Angola	71,416	1.11	3	–2
Democratic Party for Progress – Angolan National Alliance	32,952	0.51	0	–1
Liberal Democratic Party	21,341	0.33	0	–3
Democratic Angola – Coalition	18,967	0.29	0	–1
Party for Democratic Support and Progress of Angola	17,509	0.27	0	New
Front for Democracy	17,073	0.26	0	New
Party of the Alliance of Youth, Workers and Farmers of Angola	15,535	0.24	0	–1
Democratic Renewal Party	14,238	0.22	0	–1
Electoral Political Platform	12,052	0.19	0	New
Angolan Fraternal Forum Coalition	10,858	0.17	0	New
Total	6,450,407	100.00	220	0
Valid votes	6,450,407	89.42		
Invalid/blank votes	762,874	10.58		
Total votes	7,213,281	100.00		
Registered voters/turnout	8,256,584	87.36		
Source: African Elections Database

== Aftermath ==
Following the results, UNITA's Permanent Committee held a two-day meeting to consider the outcome of the election and Samakuva's leadership. On 19 September 2008, the Permanent Committee said in a statement that it "salutes the performance and reaffirms its confidence" in Samakuva. According to the statement, only 20% of the party's poor performance was the result of UNITA's own failings; it placed the primary blame for its defeat on abuses by the MPLA.

On 26 September, the MPLA Political Bureau chose Paulo Kassoma to replace Fernando da Piedade Dias dos Santos as Prime Minister; it also chose Piedade to become the new President of the National Assembly. Speaking to the MPLA Political Bureau, President dos Santos said that the party's "victory is cause for great joy and celebration" and that the MPLA had a responsibility to "continue to consolidate peace and national reconciliation, rebuild infrastructure, and multiply efforts to fight hunger, poverty and regional imbalances". He stressed that the MPLA could only achieve those goals if the party and its parliamentary deputies practiced "humility, rigour, and discipline", and he urged the party to "not sleep under the shade of the conquest we got at the ballot box, nor get carried away by vanity and a superiority complex".

214 of the newly elected members of the National Assembly were sworn in on 30 September; Piedade was elected as President of the National Assembly on the same occasion, receiving 211 votes in favor and three opposed. Meanwhile, João Lourenço was elected as First Vice-President of the National Assembly (213 votes in favor, none opposed, and one abstention), Joana Lina as Second Vice-President (207 votes in favor, four opposed, and three abstentions), Ernesto Mulato as Third Vice-President (210 votes in favor, one opposed, and three abstentions), and Benedito Muxiri as Fourth Vice-President (211 votes in favor, none opposed, and three abstentions). Four parliamentary secretaries were also elected.

dos Santos appointed Kassoma as Prime Minister on 30 September, and he was sworn in on the same day. Speaking to the press, Kassoma said that he would place a priority on accelerating the process of national reconstruction.

The EU observers criticized lack of transparency and strongly pro-MPLA media bias in their election report published on 11 December 2008.

In a 45-page report released on 23 February 2009 and titled "Democracy or Monopoly? Angola's Reluctant Return to Elections", Human Rights Watch criticized alleged flaws in the election, saying that the electoral commission did not act as an independent and impartial body in overseeing the election. Human Rights Watch urged that the electoral commission be reformed "to ensure credible and independent oversight of all future elections".
