= Democratic Front for the Liberation of Angola =

Political movement in colonial Angola

The Democratic Front for the Liberation of Angola (Portuguese: Frente Democrática de Libertação de Angola, abbreviated FDLA) was an alliance of Angolan political parties founded in July 1963. FDLA was the brainchild of the chairman of the Popular Movement for the Liberation of Angola (MPLA) Agostinho Neto, as a united front against Portuguese colonial rule. However, other coalition partners in the FDLA were rather minor groups with dubious reputation. Neto sought to position the FDLA towards the Organization of African Unity (OAU) as an alternative to the National Liberation Front of Angola (FNLA), a move that severely backfired. The FDLA debacle aggravated tensions within the MPLA leadership and weakened the party.

== Background ==
In the wake of the beginning of armed conflict against Portuguese rule over Angola in 1961, there emerged an internal crisis within the exiled MPLA leadership over the inability of the party to occupy a leading role in the struggle and forming a united front with the Union of Peoples of Angola (UPA). When the Revolutionary Government of Angola in Exile (GRAE) was formed on April 3, 1962 the MPLA had been left out. In May 1962 Viriato da Cruz was removed from his post as MPLA general secretary. As Neto took over the party leadership, he continued to pursue policy of seeking a broad front of all nationalist groups. On August 5, 1962 Neto led a MPLA delegation to negotiate a united front with FNLA. Neto proposed that MPLA be included in a broad front on equal footing with the FNLA constituents UPA and PDA (which would effectively replace the FNLA with a new entity). The proposal was unacceptable for FNLA, which withdrew from the talks.

In December 1962 MPLA held its first national conference in Léopoldville, at which Neto was elected as the head of the party executive. The conference called for the formation of a united front based on a minimum program of struggle for national independence, but that MPLA would retain its role as a political vanguard with a separate identity within the front.

== Founding of FDLA ==
A first coordination meeting in the search of unity of Angolan liberation movements was convened by Congo-Brazzaville president Fulbert Youlou in Brazzaville on June 1, 1963. FNLA did not attend. On June 29, 1963 the government of Congo-Léopoldville formally recognized GRAE. In response to the GRAE recognition across the river, a second meeting was convened by Youlou in Brazzaville on July 1, 1963. The MPLA delegation was led by the party vice president Domingos da Silva. Other MPLA delegates at the July 1 gathering were Domingos da Silva, Luís de Azevedo, Noémia Tavira, Daniel Chipenda and Aníbal de Melo.The FNLA dleegation consisted of Holden Roberto and Emanuel Kunzika. Other groups attending were the Movement for the Defense of Angolan Interests (MDIA), the Angolan Nationalist Movement (MNA), the National Union of Angolan Workers (UNTA) and the Movement for the Liberation of the Enclave of Cabinda (MLEC).

In his opening remarks to the July 1, 1963 meeting, Youlou called on the attendees not to abandon the meeting hall until unity of movement and action had been achieved. In his speech Youlou implicitly rejected the unilateral recognition of GRAE by Congo-Léopoldville. Addressing the meeting the FNLA delegation that there was already a united front (FNLA), which the other parties were welcome to join. The FNLA delegation then abandoned the meeting. The deliberations continued after the departure of the FNLA representatives. MLEC also left the talks, after its president Luis Ranque Franque had expressed willingness to cooperative with the Angolan nationalist movement but that the main interest of MLEC was the unity of Cabindans. Another group that had not been part of the meeting from the beginning, Ngwizako, appeared at the venue.

MPLA continued consulations with the different groups, resulting in the foundation of the FDLA was founded in Léopoldville early July 1963. The foundation of FDLA occurred in response to the recognition of GRAE by Congo-Léopoldville. The FDLA was intended as a counter-weight to the FNLA. By forming an alliance MPLA hoped to broaden its base and be able to get a stronger position in arguing for its inclusion in GRAE. Adebayo Adedeji (1999) argued that by forming a front with different Bakongo parties, MPLA would seek to gain support in the northern communities (hitherto the bastion of UPA) and recruit guerrilla fighters from there.

=== Members ===
FDLA members were MPLA, UNTA, Ngwizako, MNA and MDIA. MDIA was initially admitted only on provisional basis, due to the party president being accused of collaboration with the Portuguese authorities (he had supported the idea holding elections under Portuguese rule). Apart from UNTA, all of the FDLA constituent parties promptly suffered splits around the time of creation of the front - with one faction adhering to FDLA and another rejecting FDLA membership.

UNTA was the trade union wing of the MPLA. It was based among support from Bakongo refugees and emigres in Congo-Léopoldville. The other constituents were small tribalist groups which drew support from northern Angola and Bakongo refugee communities in Congo-Léopoldville.

Out of the smaller FDLA constituents, MDIA and Ngwizako were accused of collaborating with the Portuguese administration. The MPLA itself had previously accused these groups of being supported by the Salazar regime.

The Ngwizani a Kongo (Ngwizako) was a monarchist Bakongo organization, which had been opposed to armed struggle. It drew support from Catholics whom had supported the Portuguese choice of António III as new king at São Salvador. By 1963 Ngwizako had been split into two factions - the more conservative Associação faction and the more radical Aliança faction. The latter was formed by younger members of the movement, frustrated with the lack of progress in the establishment of an autonomous Kongo kingdom through cooperation with the Portuguese authorities. It was the smaller Aliança group that joined FDLA, whilst the Associação was holding a congress in Léopoldville June 29-July 1, 1963. On July 8, the Associação group issued a statement denouncing the Aliança for having joined FDLA, stating that thereby the Aliança group had implicitly endorsed the GRAE.

MDIA was another group that had opposed armed struggle. It largely made up by Bazombo emigres. It had split from UPA in 1961, and was led by Jean Pierre M'Bala. In 1962 the United Nations Special Committee of Territories Under Portuguese Administration, after a visit to the MDIA headquarters in Léopoldville had stated that the party was used by the Portuguese government "for the purpose of being able to claim that it had the cooperation of some Angolan group." The party underwent a sudden split around the time of the formation of FDLA, as Augustin Kaziluki and Simon Diallo Mingiedi broke links with M'Bala and opted to support to the FDLA. M'Bala continued to lead the loyalist faction of MDIA, but on July 5, 1963 he flew from Brazzaville to Luanda upon invitation from the Portuguese Governor-General of Angola. The FDLA-faction of MDIA later announced the creation of MDIA War Department, calling on volunteers to go for military training abroad.

MNA, the smallest FDLA member organization, was a party based among the Sorongo people who inhabited an area just south of the River Congo estuary. Previously MNA had been Preparatory Committee of the Angolan People's Congress (CPCP) of Kassinda and Kassanda, but by mid-1963 the party had been reorganized under the leadership of Francisco Mayembe (who left UPA in December 1961 in rejection of militant strategy of Holden) and was now closer to UNTA.

=== FDLA platform ===
The founding member organization of FDLA agreed on a 14-point platform of the FDLA;
1. Complete liquidation, by all available means, of Portuguese colonialism in Angola
2. Consolidation of national independence, through a policy of non-alignment
3. Struggle against all forms of neocolonialism
4. Establishment in Angola of a democratic regime, in which the fundamental rights of man will be guaranteed
5. Admission into the Frente [FDLA] of all organizations wishing to join it
6. Intensification of both the armed and diplomatic fights
7. Formation of a Political Council, which must approve all opinions issued in the name of the Frente
8. Formation of a single liberation army under a single military command
9. Formation of a single organization for social assistance and for the education of the masses
10. Condemnation of fratricidal fighting and of all manifestations of tribalism and religious and racial intolerance
11. Development of the spirit of brotherhood and mutual assistance among Angolans of all social classes
12. Constant defense of national unity and of the territorial integrity of the country
13. Solemn and active dedication to the realization of African unity, in the spirit of the Charter of Addis Ababa
14. Respect for the personality of each organization belonging to the Frente

=== Leadership ===
The founding convention of FDLA created FDLA leading bodies, an Executive Committee and a National Council. Neto headed the nine-member Executive Committee as the FDLA President. Emmanuel Loureiro (Ngwizako) was named First Vice President and Pascal Luvualu (UNTA) was named Second Vice President. Other members of the Executive Committee were Secretary of Foreign Relations Mário Pinto de Andrade (MPLA), Secretary of War Armindo de Freitas (MPLA), Secretary for Information, Press, Propaganda and Cultural Questions José Tito (MNA), Secretary for Social Questions Bernard Ndombele (UNTA) and Secretary of Interior Augusto Monteiro (Ngwizako). At the time of the founding of FDLA, the post of Secretary of Finances had been left vacant, albeit the post was soon filled by Augustin Kaziluki (MDIA). The Executive Committee was supposed to implement the policies articulated by the National Council, and arbitrate in disputes between member organizations.

As such, in practice the FDLA the sought to function as a second Angolan government in exile. MPLA was the dominant force within FDLA, and the party held the key posts such as War and Foreign Affairs. However the MPLA leader named as FDLA Secretary of Foreign Affairs, Andrade, refused to accept this post.

The National Council would have six members from each affiliated party. The task of the National Council was to articulate general policy based on the FDLA platform. At the time of the founding convention of FDLA the National Council consisted of Neto, Armindo Freitas, Daniel Chipenda, José Aguiar, Manuel Miguel and Mário de Andrade from MPLA, Pascal Luvualu, Bernard Dombele, Emile Mbidi, Miguel Luzolo, Henri Kunfunda and Simon Luyindula from UNTA, Francisco Mayembe, José Tito, Edouard Tshimpy, João Lenge, Alberto Gomes and Daniel Nolo from MNA, Emmanuel Loureiro, Antoine Menga, Albert Matundu, Pierre Milton Mvulu, Augusto Monteiro and Eduardo Milokwa Casimiro from Ngwizako. The MDIA representatives that would join the FDLA National Council were Augustin Kaziluki, Simon Diallo, Sumbu Martin, Pierre Magolo, Ferdinand Pembele and André Kiala.

The Political Council of the National Council was led by a President (Francisco Mayembe, MNA), and included Daniel Chipenda (MPLA) as First Vice President, Mvulu Pierre Milton (Ngwizako) as Second Vice President and Emile Mbidi Dongala (UNTA) as Third Vice President. A later account had MDIA representative Sumbu Martin as the President of the Political Council, and Mayembe as First Vice President, Chipenda as Second Vice President, Milton as Third Vice President and Dougala as Fourth Vice President.

== Split in MPLA ==
The formation of FDLA became the source of significant controversy, as the smaller parties in the coalition were regarded as reactionary and collaborationists. The new allies of MPLA had hitherto opposed the armed struggle. Neto did not deny that these groups had been collaborationists, but argued that prior to their joining FDLA the 'opportunist wing' of each group had been expelled. The FDLA issue provoked debates among MPLA students in Africa and Europe. Neto would later write a lengthy letter to MPLA cadres abroad, justifying the formation of FDLA. He argued that the FDLA had been founded in line with the decisions of the December 1962 MPLA First National Conference, stating that "[t]he constitution of the FDLA obeyed the vehement desire expressed by the entire Angolan population that had taken refuge in the Congo and the North of the country. It corresponded to the desire and political need of the majority of nationalist organizations. Interested militants know how the [MPLA] strove to launch the slogan of unity and the idea of a united front, especially after the First National Conference. [...] [O]nly those who are unaware of the concrete reality of Angolan nationalism can think that the FDLA constitutes a useless and even detrimental element of our politics. [...]. Moreover, the MPLA's minimum program already called for the urgent creation of an Angolan Liberation Front, which would bring together in a broad union all political parties, all eminent personalities of the country, all religious organizations, all national or ethnic minorities of Angola, and all social strata."

The FDLA issue brought the internal crisis in MPLA, which had been brewing for some time, to the fore. On July 5, 1963 a 'MPLA Sovereign General Assembly' meeting was held in Léopoldville by the group of Viriato da Cruz and Matias Migues. Some 50 dissident MPLA cadres gathered. The meeting proclaimed the Neto-led Steering Committee dismissed and appealed for MPLA to join FNLA and GRAE. The meeting elected a MPLA Provisional Executive Committee consisting of da Cruz, Migues, Jose Bernardo Domingos, Georges Manteya Freitas, Jose Miguel and Antonio Alexandra (all except Alexandra were MPLA Steering Committee members). This faction became known as 'MPLA/Viriato'. Some 50-60 EPLA soldiers broke with their mestizo officers and sided with MPLA/Viriato.

On July 7, 1963 a physical altercation erupted as MPLA/Viriato interrupted a Steering Committee meeting and sought to seize control of the MPLA office in Léopoldville. The confrontation resulted in knife wounds and thrown chairs. Eventually Congolese police arrived at the scene and arrest 43 MPLA dissidents.

In addition to the MPLA/Viriato split, the MPLA military commander Manuel Lima was reportedly resigning in opposition to the FDLA.

== Announcement of the Front ==
On July 7, 1963 the MPLA secretariat in Léopoldville issued a statement, announced the foundation of FDLA with MPLA, UNTA, Ngwizako and MNA as member organizations. The statement argued that the foundation of FDLA had been done in line with the decisions of the 1963 African Unity Conference at Addis Ababa (the founding meeting of the OAU).

On July 10, 1963 Neto held a press conference at the Léopoldville Zoo Restaurant, presenting the FDLA. He thanked Youlou for the efforts to promote conciliation and unity of Angolan movement. He stated that the FDLA platform called for immediate independence from Portuguese rule. Whilst he was positive to a negotiated settlement with Portugal, he stated that FDLA opposed every sort of solution with "reformist character".

Neto declared that FDLA was ready to negotiate unity with FNLA 'without prior conditions'. Neto also stated that FDLA was ready to participate in GRAE, but without merging into FNLA. Neto argued that FDLA participation in GRAE was necessary to ensure the representative character of the government, in order to be able to exercise governing authority over all Angolans and to be able to mobilize support from African states.

A few hours later on July 10, 1963 Neto, along with FDLA First Vice President Emmanuel Loureiro (Ngwizako) and Jose Tito (MNA), headed to Léopoldville Airport to receive the OAU Goodwill Mission delegation.

== Goodwill mission ==
A key objective behind the formation of FDLA had been to seek financial aid from the OAU African Liberation Committee. The African Liberation Committee met in Dar-es-Salaam between June 25 and July 4, 1963, where the Angolan question was on the agenda. MPLA presented to the Dar-es-Salaam meeting its commitment for the formation of an Angolan Liberation Front and accused UPA of 'fratricide' and being partial to the government of Congo-Léopoldville. FNLA conveyed to the Dar-es-Salaam meeting that only they had any active combat forces inside Angola, and rejected the notion that 'windbags' without any role on the ground in the liberation struggle would get any share of the OAU assistance. The FNLA invited the OAU to visit the areas inside Angola under FNLA/GRAE control.

In response to the MPLA and FNLA testimonies, the African Liberation Committee decided that a reconciliation process was necessary to unify the Angolan liberation movement. It was decided that a Special Goodwill Mission would be sent to Léopoldville to reconcile FNLA and MPLA. The Special Goodwill Mission included representatives from Congo-Léopoldville, Guinea, Algeria, Uganda and Senegal. All six members of the Goodwill Mission were bound by a Terms of Reference which stipulated that a condition for African Liberation Committee assistance was that there should be only one Common Action Front in each territory. From the onset it appeared as if the Goodwill Mission might be favourable to MPLA, as four out of six members were considered as sympathetic to the 'common front' line of MPLA (especially Algeria, but also Guinea, Senegal and Uganda).

The Goodwill Mission proceedings began on July 14, 1963. The Nigerian Foreign Minister Jaja Wachuku, a veteran politician and friend of Holden, was elected as chairman of the Goodwill Mission. When the Goodwill Mission invited the MPLA to present its testimony, Neto stated that he would make his statement on behalf of FDLA (rather than on behalf of the MPLA). But for the Goodwill Mission FDLA was a non-entity. Jaja ruled a point of order, stating that the Goodwill Mission could only hear testimonies from the two organizations that had presented testimonies to the African Liberation Committee in Dar-es-Salaam. Furthermore, Neto intended to speak in Portuguese, but Jaja insisted that no translator was available and that the testimony would have to be made in French.

On July 15, 1963 Neto requested in writing to be able represent testimony on behalf of MPLA. But commission also received written request from da Cruz in name of the Provisional Executive Committee of MPLA to testify, and they allowed him speak on behalf of MPLA. Da Cruz stated that past claims about military capacity of the MPLA had been exaggerated and that announced that he would be joining the FNLA.

In sharp contrast to da Cruz' testimony, the FNLA organized a visit of the Goodwill Mission to a military training camp at Kinkuzu and invited the OUA representatives for a future visit to areas inside Angola under GRAE control. The FNLA testimony to the Goodwill Mission sought to capitalize on the FDLA controversy, arguing that "collaborators and secessionists" were trying to infiltrate the liberation movement in to damange revolution from within FNLA brought up a July 8, 1963 Ngwizako statement denouncing GRAE as evidence (without clarifying to the Goodwill Mission that said statement had been issued by the anti-FDLA Ngwizako faction).

The Goodwill Mission shared their findings in an open session on July 18, 1963. It had reached a unanimous decision - the FNLA was recognized as the sole legitimate Angolan liberation movement, all aid for the Angolan liberation struggle should be channeled through Congo-Léopoldville in favour of the FNLA. The Goodwill Mission called upon the "fighting force of MPLA" to join the ranks of FNLA. It emphasized that that it would request Conference of Foreign Ministers in Dakar that all African countries recognize the GRAE led by Holden.

Whilst Neto had intended that the launch of FDLA would help MPLA position itself in seeking financial support from the African Liberation Committee, the move had an opposite effect. The African Liberation Committee was suspicious of the links of the smaller FDLA constituents to the Portuguese authorities. Moreover the standing of FDLA was further undercut by a statement of Youlou (from Paris) in favour of holding elections in Angola. And that the Goodwill Mission hearings the absence of de Andrade from the MPLA delegation was notable (de Andrade had prolonged his stay in Cairo, it was rumoured at the time that his failure to show up for the Léopoldville hearings was due to his opposition to the formation of FDLA).

== Brazzaville office ==
On July 27, 1963 the FDLA vice president Emmanuel Loureiro opened a FDLA office in Brazzaville. Congo (Brazzaville) Radio began broadcasting twice-weekly MPLA-FDLA program called the Voz de Angola Combatente ('Voice of Fighting Angola').

== Nto-Bako issue ==
Nto-Bako Angola was linked to the Congolese party ABAKO, whose leader Joseph Kasa-Vubu supported the idea of a greater Kongo state. The party was led by Angelino Alberto, who had not been invited to the Brazzaville meetings resulting in the formation of FDLA.

Like with the other smaller FDLA parties, Nto-Bako was widely perceived as a tribalist and reactionary group which had been willing to collaborate with the Portuguese authorities. As with the case of MDIA and Ngwizako, youth linked to the party had been able to get scholarships for studies in Lisbon. And Nto-Bako had been accused of having provided the Portuguese authorities with information about the UPA.

By mid-1963 Nto-Bako no longer played any useful role for the Portuguese authorities. The party was divided into rival factions. The party general secretary François Lele had been expelled by Alberto for disciplinary issues. But on July 10, 1963 Lele denounced Alberto as a PIDE agent and announced the latter's expulsion from Nto-Bako. The Lele faction applied from FDLA membership. On August 1, 1963 the Léopoldville publication Le progrès carried a false account that the Lele faction had joined FDLA. Whilst neither the Alberto nor Lele groups of Nto-Bako were ever affiliated with FDLA, the reporting on the issue further damaged the image of FDLA.

== Later period ==
The FDLA had caused significant damage to the reputation of MPLA. After August 1963 FDLA no longer figured prominent in MPLA discourse, as the front had become more of a liability than asset for MPLA. The FDLA did however formally regroup in Brazzaville, along with MPLA, after MPLA was expelled from Congo-Léopoldville. On November 23, 1963 MDIA leaders Simon Diallo Mingiedi, Augustin Kaziluki, and others announced their departure from FDLA, citing OUA recommendations, and joined PDA instead.

In May 1964 FDLA issued a statement, affirming that it was a 'true force' of Angolan nationalism and ready to reach an understanding with the 'other existing front' (i.e. FNLA). Per the May 1964 statement MDIA was no longer a member of FDLA, but that the front had been joined by the Angolan National Unity Committee (CUNA). CUNA was a group that had been formed in 1963 by Bakongo refugees from the Bembe-Carmona region of northern Angola.

In June 1964 Andrade, the supposed FDLA Secretary for Foreign Affairs, broke his silence. In an article in the Algerian publication Revolution africaine he confirmed that he had been absent from the OAU hearings in Léopoldville and Dakar due to his opposition to FDLA. He condemned the role of Youlou, arguing that Youlou had FDLA created in order to negotiate a compromise settlement with the Portuguese.

At some point FDLA ceased to exist, but no formal announcement was ever made. An occasional FDLA statement issued in early 1965 was met with a GRAE counter-statement, denouncing FDLA as 'pro-colonialist'. FDLA was largely left out of MPLA documents on party history. For example there was no mention of FDLA in the booklet Dez Anos da Existência, Dez Anos da Luta em prol do Povo Angolano issued for the tenth MPLA foundation anniversary.

== Legacy ==
The FDLA proved to be an ephemeral institution due to its heterogeneous nature. The front was damaged by the widespread perception that the Bakongo parties would be infiltrated by and/or financed by the Portuguese authorities. John A. Marcum stated that "[t]he price that the MPLA would pay for creating a front of its own proved exorbitant, internally and externally". Basil Davidson stated that in wake of FDLA debacle Neto's claim to MPLA leadership had ended and that MPLA had been "fractured, split and reduced ... to a nullity". Douglas L. Wheeler and René Pélissier (1971) stated that "[f]or an allegedly Marxist party, such an alliance with tiny groups, deeply compromised with the Portuguese who financed them, meant grasping at political survival at the expense of an entire past policy of intransigence."

== See also ==
- Trois Glorieuses (1963)
