= 2012 Angolan general election =

- 31 August 2012
- All 220 seats in the National Assembly; 111 seats needed for a majority
- Turnout: 62.77% (▼24.59 pp)
Party	Presidential candidate	Vote %	Seats	+/–
MPLA	José Eduardo dos Santos	71.84	175	−16
UNITA	Isaías Samakuva	18.66	32	+16
CASA–CE	Abel Chivukuvuku	6.00	8	New
PRS	Eduardo Kuangana	1.70	3	−5
FNLA	Lucas Ngonda	1.13	2	−1
This lists parties that won seats. See the complete results below.

President before	President after
José Eduardo dos Santos; MPLA	José Eduardo dos Santos; MPLA

General elections were held in Angola on 31 August 2012 to elect the President and National Assembly. These were the first elections after the new 2010 constitution was instituted. During campaigning, the opposition UNITA and its offshoot CASA-CE accused and criticised the government of corruption and called for greater transparency; this led to protests and arrests the day before the election.

== Background ==
While UNITA accepted the result of the National Assembly elections in 1992, it rejected that of the 1992 presidential elections, alleging fraud. UNITA then resumed the civil war, though its MPs still took their seats in the National Assembly. As a result, the second round of the presidential elections were not held, nor were the parliamentary elections due at regular intervals in accordance with the 1992 constitution. The civil war came to an end in 2002, following the death of UNITA's leader Jonas Savimbi in an ambush. The ruling MPLA still refused to hold the second round of the presidential election, but organised parliamentary elections in 2008.

The MPLA's resultant majority allowed it to adopt a new 2010 constitution, which abolished the direct election of the president. The constitution stipulated that parliamentary elections would be held at intervals of five years and that the leader of the party that received the most votes would become president. The expectation of all parties was that this would lead to the endurance of the dominant party system.

== Electoral system ==
At the time of the election, the National Assembly had 220 seats, of which 130 were elected from closed lists by proportional representation and the remaining 90 elected in 18 five-seat constituencies. Process required that following the election, the leader of the largest party would become president. Voters had to be at least 18 years old and not have an undischarged bankruptcy or criminal conviction. Candidates had to be at least 35 years old.

In accordance with the 2010 constitution the president was elected by first-past-the-post double simultaneous vote for the same term as the assembly, to serve a maximum of two terms. Each participating party nominated a presidential candidate as top of its list, clearly identified on the ballot paper. The top candidate of the party receiving the most votes was elected president.

Over 10,000 voting centres were opened from 07:00-18:00, while the day was declared a national holiday.

== Campaign ==
A total of nine parties and coalitions contested the elections, four of which were parties (the MPLA, UNITA, the National Liberation Front of Angola (FNLA) and the Social Renewal Party); and five of which were coalitions (the United Front for Change of Angola (FUMA), the New Democracy Electoral Union, the People's Party for Development (PAPOD), CASA–CE and the Political Opposition Council (CPO)). CASA-CE is a breakaway from UNITA that was formed after its leader Abel Chivukuvuku lost the UNITA leadership election to Samakuva, and it sought to mobilise voters from inside and outside UNITA against the MPLA.

On 13 June 2012, the MPLA Central Committee designated incumbent President José Eduardo dos Santos as head of the MPLA party list and Manuel Vicente, the Minister of State for Economic Coordination, as the second candidate on the list. Under the Angolan constitution, this resulted in dos Santos receiving another term as president, with Vicente becoming vice-president.

UNITA criticised the government for corruption in Angola and, amongst other reasons, giving the contract to run the election to the Spanish company Indra Sistemas, which also ran the 2008 election and was accused of helping the MPLA win that election. The media were reported to have been biased in their coverage in favour of the incumbent MPLA. However, UNITA was also expected to gain a larger share of the vote and cut the MPLA's popular vote from the previous election. Other issues centred on greater transparency and a more democratic government.

== Conduct ==
National police commander General Ambrósio de Lemos said he was ready to ensure that electoral laws were enforced: "We will not tolerate nor allow these elections to be derailed. Citizens must be able to access the polling stations, in accordance with their civil rights, without any problems."

The day before the election, as members of CASA-CE sought to enter the office of the National Electoral Commission (CNE) in order observation rights, police arrested about a dozen party members. Party candidate William Tonet told Reuters that police outside the building that they had fired shots to keep away young party members. However, this was unconfirmed by an unnamed police officer at the Quarta Esquadra police station nearby, though the arrests were affirmed. Tonet added that no injuries occurred. He mentioned that of the 6,850 requisitioned accreditions, only 3,000 had been given. However, the CNE had said it approved 97,000 local observers from the nine parties and coalitions that were contesting the election. Luis Ngimbi, the head of a local team of observers, said of the campaign that "while no major incidents were reported, the campaign has been disappointing because of the lack of details of promises."

Samakuva also expressed concern prior to the election about possible irregularities, mainly in regards to the voter roll. He said: "Many Angolans' names don't appear on the voter roll, and in many places the voter roll has not been released. We have come to the conclusion that the National Electoral Commission is not ready. The conditions don't exist to ensure the minimum of an organised, transparent process." He also sought to meet Dos Santos to express the concerns and ask for monitoring accreditation for 2,000 of its party workers.

After Dos Santos, who voted at a school near his official residence, said: "I am satisfied because the process is going smoothly throughout the country. I urge all Angolans to vote, to vote for democracy, which is important," he said. "Today people have power in their hands, and it's a great responsibility." This was the first direct vote on his presidency.

The African Union claimed that the elections had been "free, fair, transparent and credible", but noted that opposition parties had not been given equal access to the media. UNITA announced that they would appeal the results of the election, claiming that the results announced by the National Election Commission did not match their counts at polling stations. CASA-CE took the same position.

== Results ==
Party	Presidential candidate	Votes	%	Seats	+/–
MPLA	José Eduardo dos Santos	4,135,503	71.85	175	–16
UNITA	Isaías Samakuva	1,074,565	18.67	32	+16
CASA–CE	Abel Chivukuvuku	345,589	6.00	8	New
Social Renewal Party	Eduardo Kuangana	98,233	1.71	3	–5
National Liberation Front of Angola	Lucas Ngonda	65,163	1.13	2	–1
New Democracy Electoral Union	Quintino Moreira	13,337	0.23	0	–2
People's Party for Development	Artur Quexona Finda	8,710	0.15	0	New
United Front for Change of Angola	António Muaxicungo	8,260	0.14	0	New
Political Opposition Council	Anastácio João Finda	6,644	0.12	0	New
Total		5,756,004	100.00	220	0
Valid votes		5,756,004	93.98		
Invalid/blank votes		368,665	6.02		
Total votes		6,124,669	100.00		
Registered voters/turnout		9,757,671	62.77		
Source: National Election Commission

As expected, results vary greatly from one region to another. In Luanda Province and Cabinda Province, UNITA and CASA–CE together received about 40% of the vote, compared to 25% nationally. Another feature is the high abstention rate, of 37.2%, compared to 12.5% in the 1992 elections.

== Aftermath ==
Dos Santos was sworn in for a five-year term as president, with Vicente as vice-president, on 26 September 2012. A day later, on 27 September 2012, Fernando da Piedade Dias dos Santos was elected as President of the National Assembly.
