= 2017 Angolan general election =

- 23 and 26 August 2017
- All 220 seats in the National Assembly; 111 seats needed for a majority
- Turnout: 76.13% (▲13.36 pp)
Party	Presidential candidate	Vote %	Seats	+/–
MPLA	João Lourenço	61.08	150	−25
UNITA	Isaías Samakuva	26.67	51	+19
CASA–CE	Abel Chivukuvuku	9.45	16	+8
PRS	Benedito Daniel	1.35	2	−1
FNLA	Lucas Ngonda	0.93	1	−1
This lists parties that won seats. See the complete results below.

President before	President after
José Eduardo dos Santos; MPLA	João Lourenço; MPLA

General elections were held in Angola on 23 August 2017 to elect the President and National Assembly, although voting was delayed until 26 August at 15 polling stations due to bad weather on election day. The top candidate of the winning party is elected president. The ruling party MPLA headed by João Lourenço was widely expected to win. Preliminary results show that MPLA won with a clear margin. The final results were released on 6 September 2017.

== Background ==
Initially it was thought that long-time president José Eduardo dos Santos would lead the ruling MPLA into the election before possibly stepping down in 2018, but in December 2016 the MPLA designated João Lourenço, the minister of defense and vice-president of the MPLA, as the party's top candidate and therefore its presidential candidate. Lourenço was viewed as strongly loyal to dos Santos. Bornito de Sousa was designated as the party's vice-presidential candidate.

In April 2017, the Council of the Republic, which acts as an advisory body to the president, proposed holding the election on 23 August 2017. It was announced on 26 April that dos Santos had formally approved the proposed date.

In early July 2017, National Electoral Commission (CNE) stated that it was expecting 3,000 national and international election observers in the country during the elections.

On 21 July 2017, the National Assembly approved legislation that would keep top security officials (the chiefs of the army, police and intelligence) in place for eight years, thereby preventing presidents from choosing the occupants of those posts at will.

The official campaign period ran from 22 July to 21 August.

== Electoral system ==
The 220 members of the National Assembly are elected by two methods; 130 are elected by closed list proportional representation in a single nationwide constituency, with seats allocated proportionally. 90 are elected in 18 five-seat constituencies, using the d'Hondt method. Voters must be at least 18 years old and not have an undischarged bankruptcy, criminal conviction, dual citizenship or have been declared insane. Candidates must be at least 35 years old.

The president is elected by first-past-the-post double simultaneous vote for the same term as the assembly, and may serve a maximum of two terms. Each participating party nominates a presidential candidate as top of its list, who must be clearly identified on the ballot paper. The top candidate of the party receiving the most votes is elected president in accordance with the 2010 constitution.

== Results ==
Preliminary results released shortly after the election showed the MPLA with 64.8% of the vote. Final results released by the electoral commission on 6 September 2017 showed the MPLA receiving 61% of the vote, giving it a parliamentary majority of 150 out of 220 seats and ensuring that João Lourenço would become president.

Party	Presidential candidate	Votes	%	Seats	+/–
MPLA	João Lourenço	4,164,157	61.08	150	–25
UNITA	Isaías Samakuva	1,818,903	26.68	51	+19
CASA–CE	Abel Chivukuvuku	643,961	9.45	16	+8
Social Renewal Party	Benedito Daniel	92,222	1.35	2	–1
National Liberation Front of Angola	Lucas Ngonda	63,658	0.93	1	–1
National Patriotic Alliance	Quintino Moreira	34,976	0.51	0	New
Total		6,817,877	100.00	220	0
Valid votes		6,817,877	96.12		
Invalid/blank votes		275,125	3.88		
Total votes		7,093,002	100.00		
Registered voters/turnout		9,317,294	76.13		
Source: CNE

== Opposition appeal ==
On 27 August Samakuva challenged the election results. On 8 September, UNITA filed a lawsuit claiming evidence of voter fraud. However, the Constitutional Court rejected the opposition's appeal on 13 September. It was announced that Lourenço would be sworn in on 26 September 2017.
