= Military Council for Angolan Resistance =

Militant organization active during the Angolan Civil War

- Comité Militar da Resistencia Angolana
- Leaders: P. Tuba and H. V. Nato
- Founded: August 12, 1980
- Part of: National Liberation Front of Angola's militant wing

Military Council for Angolan Resistance (Portuguese: Comité Militar da Resistencia Angolana; COMIRA) was a militant organization that fought in the Angolan Civil War in the 1980s.

The militant wing of the National Liberation Front of Angola (FNLA) created COMIRA on August 12, 1980. P. Tuba and H. V. Nato led COMIRA upon its creation.

COMIRA leaders said they overthrew FNLA leader Holden Roberto on September 15, 1980 in Paris, France, making the FNLA a part of COMIRA.

== See also ==
- UNITA
- MPLA
