= Kabangu =

Kabangu is a surname. Notable people with the surname include:

- Elton Kabangu (born 1998), Belgian footballer
- Kami Kabangu (born 1984), Congolese-Rwandan basketball player
- Ngola Kabangu (born 1943), Angolan politician
- Patou Kabangu (born 1985), Democratic Republic of the Congo footballer
