= Abel Chivukuvuku =

Angolan politician

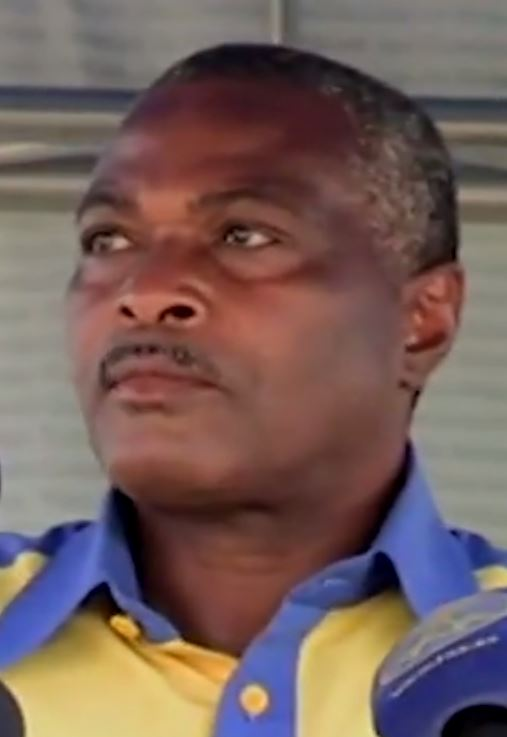
- Chivukuvuku in 2017

Leader of PRA JÁ
- Incumbent
- Assumed office March 2012
- Preceded by: Position established

Personal details
- Born: 11 November 1957 (age 68) Huambo Province, Angola
- Party: UNITA (1974-2012); CASA-CE (2012-2018); PRA JÁ (2019-present)

Abel Epalanga Chivukuvuku (born November 11, 1957) is an Angolan politician and leader of the Broad Convergence for the Salvation of Angola electoral alliance (CASA-CE). Previously, as a long-time member of the National Union for the Total Independence of Angola (UNITA), he served as the Chief of UNITA's Parliament from October 1998 to September 2000.

Margarida Chivukuvuku, wife of Pedro Chivukuvuku, gave birth to Abel in Luvemba, Huambo Province in 1957. His parents enrolled him in Dondi Mission, Bela Vista elementary school and Huambo National Secondary School. He joined UNITA in 1974 and its armed wing, the Armed Forces of the Liberation of Angola, in 1976. Chivukuvuku became UNITA's representative to the rest of Africa in 1979. He later served as Angola's representative to Portugal and the United Kingdom. He returned to Angola and ran in the 1992 parliamentary elections. He sustained wounds in the ensuing Halloween Massacre. MPLA police arrested him, holding him until 1997. He did not take sides in UNITA's factional disputes in the 1990s and his fellow parliamentarians elected him Chief of UNITA's Parliament in October 1998. He served until September 2000. Later, beginning in 2004, he served as a member of the Pan-African Parliament from Angola.

In 2012, Chivukuvuku left UNITA and founded the Broad Convergence for the Salvation of Angola electoral alliance (CASA-CE), which became one of the main contenders in the 2012 legislative election, winning 6% of the votes.

== See also ==
- List of members of the Pan-African Parliament
