= António Alberto Neto =

Angolan politician

António Alberto Neto (born 16 June 1943) is the President of the Angolan Democratic Party (PDA). He served as the representative of the People's Movement for the Liberation of Angola (MPLA) to the Nordic countries from September 1970 to May 1973. Saydi Mingas succeeded him.

Neto was the PDA's presidential candidate in the 1992 general elections. He finished third out of eleven candidates, receiving 2% of the vote.
