= Carlos Contreiras =

Angolan politician

Carlos Contreiras is an Angolan politician. He is the president of the Republican Party of Angola (PREA). He was a candidate in the 2003 Angolan presidential election.
