= 2022 Angolan general election =

- 24 August 2022
- All 220 seats in the National Assembly; 111 seats needed for a majority
- Turnout: 44.82% (▼33.31pp)
Party	Presidential candidate	Vote %	Seats	+/–
MPLA	João Lourenço	51.17	124	−26
UNITA	Adalberto Costa Júnior	43.95	90	+39
PRS	Benedito Daniel	1.14	2	0
FNLA	Nimi Ya Simbi	1.06	2	+1
PHA	Florbela Malaquias	1.02	2	New
This lists parties that won seats. See the complete results below.
President before	President after
João Lourenço; MPLA	João Lourenço; MPLA

General elections were held in Angola on 24 August 2022 to elect the president and National Assembly. Incumbent president João Lourenço was eligible for one more term. The MPLA was re-elected with a reduced majority, winning 124 seats with 51% of the vote. The main opposition party, UNITA won 90 seats with 44% of the vote. The Social Renewal Party (PRS), the National Liberation Front of Angola (FNLA) and the Humanist Party of Angola (PHA) each won two seats. The elections were the closest in Angolan history between the MPLA and UNITA.

== Background ==
The MPLA has been in power since Angola gained independence in 1975. It had fought a civil war with UNITA until 2002.

The previous elections held in 2017 saw the ruling MPLA win a landslide re-election, obtaining 61% of the vote. Although the party lost 25 seats, the MPLA retained its supermajority in the National Assembly, securing 150 seats. The largest opposition party, UNITA, won only 51 seats but did gain 19 with a 26% vote total. CASA—CE won 16 seats, the PRS won two and the FNLA secured one. Following the election, UNITA accused the ruling party of engaging in electoral fraud and filed a lawsuit. However, the constitutional court dismissed UNITA's case at appeal. The long-serving head of state, José Eduardo dos Santos, did not seek re-election to the presidency and was succeeded by defence minister João Lourenço.

The election date was announced on 6 April 2022.

== Electoral system ==
The 220 members of the National Assembly are elected by two methods: 90 are elected in 18 five-seat constituencies, using the d'Hondt method, while the remaining 130 are selected by proportional representation using closed lists, allocated proportionally to the nationwide results. Voters must be at least 18 years old and not have an undischarged bankruptcy, criminal conviction, dual citizenship or have been declared insane. Candidates must be at least 35 years old.

Each party nominates a candidate for President of Angola, who is both head of state and head of government, as the first entry on their list. The president is elected by double simultaneous vote – each vote for a party is automatically a vote for their nominee as president, who must be clearly stated on the ballot paper. The presidential candidate of the party receiving the most votes (first-past-the-post) is elected president, for the same term as the assembly. The president may serve a maximum of two terms in accordance with the 2010 constitution.

== Conduct ==
Polling stations opened at 7 am and closed at 5 pm local time. Local observers have said the election was free. Observers from the Southern African Development Community (SADC) said that the vote was peaceful, but noted a lack of local observers. The observer mission of the Community of Portuguese Language Countries did not initially assess the vote as fair and free, as they claim some candidates were given more air times, party delegates did not have access to the roll at polling stations and around 2.7 million deceased were included in the roll. A European Union spokesperson stated the election was conducted peacefully, but they were aware of complaints on some shortcomings. Regional and international election monitors that were led by the African Union have declared the election process was done in an adequate manner.

== Parties ==
Eight parties were on the ballot in the elections:

Party/Coalition		Candidate	2017 result	
Party/Coalition		Candidate	Votes (%)	Seats
MPLA	People's Movement for the Liberation of Angola; Movimento Popular de Libertação de Angola	João Lourenço	61.1%	150 / 220
UNITA	National Union for the Total Independence of Angola; União Nacional para a Independência Total de Angola	Adalberto Costa Júnior	26.7%	51 / 220
CASA–CE	Broad Convergence for the Salvation of Angola – Electoral Coalition; Convergência Ampla de Salvação de Angola – Coligação Eleitoral	Manuel Fernandes	9.5%	16 / 220
PRS	Social Renewal Party; Partido de Renovação Social	Benedito Daniel	1.4%	2 / 220
FNLA	National Liberation Front of Angola; Frente Nacional de Libertação de Angola	Nimi Ya Simbi	0.9%	1 / 220
APN	National Patriotic Alliance; Aliança Patriótica Nacional	Quintino Moreira	0.5%	0 / 220
P-NJANGO	Nationalist Party for Justice in Angola; Partido Nacionalista para a Justiça em Angola	Dinho Chingunji	—N/a	—N/a
PHA	Humanist Party of Angola; Partido Humanista de Angola	Florbela Malaquias	—N/a	—N/a

== Campaign ==
On 5 October, the main opposition parties of Angola announced that they were forming a coalition named United Patriotic Front. Adalberto Costa Júnior of UNITA was nominated as FPU's candidate to challenge president João Lourenço in the August 2022 vote, group spokesman Amandio Capoco confirmed in Luanda. Capoco described the alliance as "an alliance of Angolans eager for change". Adalberto Costa Júnior responded by announcing that he is ready to challenge João Lourenço, "our homeland is crying out for change", describing a country "stricken by despair and by impoverishment".

The campaign was also overshadowed by the death of former president José Eduardo dos Santos on 8 July 2022. There was an ongoing feud between the dos Santos family and incumbent president João Lourenço, in which the family accused the president of persecution and demanded a pardon for several of dos Santos children in order for the body of José Eduardo dos Santos to return to Angola for burial. As part of his anti-corruption campaign, some of the ex-presidents' supporters and members of his family have been sent to prison.

Campaign issues included high levels of poverty and unemployment. The country's oil wealth remains mostly in the hands of a few MPLA officials. UNITA's candidate Costa Junior was popular among the youth, many of whom are unemployed.

=== Party slogans ===
Party or alliance	Original slogan	English translation	Refs
MPLA	« A força do Povo »	"The strength of the people"	
UNITA	« A hora é Agora »	"The time is now"	
CASA–CE	« Por Angola e pelos Angolanos »	"For Angola and the Angolans"	
PRS	« Confiante para governar Angola »	"Confident to govern Angola"	
APN	« Quintino de Moreira, o candidato certo »	"Quintino de Moreira, the right candidate"	
P-NJANGO	« O garante de uma nação justa »	"The guarantor of a just nation"	
PHA	« Humanizar Angola »	"Humanize Angola"	

== Opinion polls ==
=== Polling ===
Polling firm	Fieldwork date	Sample size	MPLA	UNITA	CASA–CE	PRS	FNLA	PRA JÁ	BD	O	Lead
2022 general election	24 August 2022	—N/a	51.2; 124	44.0; 90	0.8; 0	1.1; 2	1.1; 2	—N/a	—N/a	1.8; 2	7.2
Sigma Dos	30 Jul–20 Aug 2022	6,967	53.6; 122–130	42.4; 85–93	1.7; 1–3	0.5; 0–1	0.3; 0	—N/a	—N/a	1.5; 1–3	11.2
AngoBarómetro	9–15 Aug 2022	4,198	30.4	56.3	6.0	4.0	1.1	—N/a	—N/a	2.2	25.9
MovimentoCívicoMudei (Note: Results presented here exclude Blank/Invalid/Protest votes (5.3%). With their inclusion results are: UNITA: 51.2%; MPLA: 26.4%; CASA–CE: 7.5%; PRS: 2.7%; FNLA: 2.5%; APN: 1.8%; Others: 2.5%.)	11 August 2022	987	27.9	54.1	7.9	2.9	2.6	—N/a	—N/a	4.6	26.2
Angopolls	15–22 Jul 2022	1,085	59.0	33.0	—N/a	—N/a	—N/a	—N/a	—N/a	8.0	26.0
POB Brasil	16–21 Jul 2022	1,500	62.0	33.0	—N/a	—N/a	—N/a	—N/a	—N/a	5.0	29.0
MovimentoCívicoMudei (Note: Results presented here exclude Blank/Invalid/Protest votes (6.5%). With their inclusion results are: UNITA: 50.2%; MPLA: 27.9%; CASA–CE: 7.1%; PRS: 3.8%; FNLA: 2.1%; APN: 0.9%; Others: 1.7%.)	5–17 Jul 2022	907	29.8	53.7	7.6	4.1	2.2	—N/a	—N/a	2.6	23.9
AngoBarómetro	11–16 Jul 2022	1,460	34.6	53.8	5.2	3.9	1.4	—N/a	—N/a	1.2	19.2
AngoBarómetro	15–24 Jun 2022	1,302	31.6	51.2	6.6	5.8	2.1	—N/a	—N/a	2.7	19.6
MovimentoCívicoMudei	Jun 2022	934	33.2	54.0	5.6	3.8	2.6	—N/a	—N/a	0.8	20.8
MovimentoCívicoMudei	May 2022	884	33.8	53.7	7.4	3.0	1.5	—N/a	—N/a	0.6	19.9
MovimentoCívicoMudei	9–11 Apr 2022	884	31.5	54.5	6.7	3.7	1.2	—N/a	—N/a	2.4	23.0
MovimentoCívicoMudei	11–15 Mar 2022	775	29.6	59.2	—N/a	—N/a	—N/a	—N/a	—N/a	11.7	29.6
Afrobarometer	9 Feb–8 Mar 2022	1,200	29	22	1	—N/a	—N/a	—N/a	—N/a	48 (Note: Others: 1%; Refused to respond: 31%; Undecided: 9%; Would not vote: 6%)	7
AngoBarómetro	29 Jan–7 Feb 2022	4,138	28.4	60.0	2.3	4.6	1.2	—N/a	3.5	—N/a	31.6
AngoBarómetro	20–23 Nov 2021	1,095	30.14	53.42	1.37	4.11	—N/a	2.74	8.22	—N/a	23.3
AngoBarómetro	1–9 Aug 2021	1,632	35.2	58.2	3.6	3.1	0.0	—N/a	—N/a	—N/a	23.0
AngoBarómetro	Feb 2021	1,050	37.7	58.9	—N/a	—N/a	—N/a	—N/a	—N/a	3.4	21.2
Afrobarometer	2019	1,200	38	13	2	—N/a	—N/a	—N/a	—N/a	47 (Note: Others: 2%; Refused to respond: 25%; Undecided: 7%; Would not vote: 14%)	25
2017 general election	23 August 2017	—N/a	61.1; 150	26.7; 51	9.5; 16	1.3; 2	0.9; 1	—N/a	—N/a	0.5; 0	34.4

== Results ==
The MPLA received 51% of the vote, and UNITA 44%. No other party received more than 1.2%. All 90 constituency seats went to the two largest parties, with the MPLA winning 57, mostly in the central and south regions, while UNITA won 33, being strongest in the north-west. Of the nationwide seats, MPLA won 67 and UNITA 57, while the PRS, FNLA and PHA won two seats each. The vote for CASA-CE collapsed; having received 9% of the vote in the previous elections in 2017, they received just 0.8% and lost all 16 of the seats they previously held.

Party	Presidential candidate	Votes	%	Seats	+/–
MPLA	João Lourenço	3,209,429	51.17	124	−26
UNITA	Adalberto Costa Júnior	2,756,786	43.95	90	+39
Social Renewal Party	Benedito Daniel	71,351	1.14	2	0
National Liberation Front of Angola	Nimi Ya Simbi	66,337	1.06	2	+1
Humanist Party of Angola	Florbela Malaquias	63,749	1.02	2	New
CASA–CE	Manuel Fernandes	47,446	0.76	0	−16
National Patriotic Alliance	Quintino Moreira	30,139	0.48	0	0
Nationalist Party for Justice in Angola	Dinho Chingunji	26,867	0.43	0	New
Total		6,272,104	100.00	220	0
Valid votes		6,272,104	97.18		
Invalid votes		74,259	1.15		
Blank votes		107,746	1.67		
Total votes		6,454,109	100.00		
Registered voters/turnout		14,399,391	44.82		
Source: National Electoral Commission

=== By constituency ===
Constituency	%	S	%	S	%	S	%	S	%	S	Total s
Constituency	MPLA		UNITA		PRS		FNLA		PHA		Total s
Bengo	55.4	3	39.2	2	0.8	-	1.7	-	1.0	-	5
Benguela	54.4	3	42.3	2	0.6	-	0.6	-	1.0	-	5
Bié	60.5	3	35.3	2	0.9	-	0.8	-	1.2	-	5
Cabinda	26.4	1	68.6	4	1.1	-	1.0	-	0.9	-	5
Cuando Cubango	69.1	4	26.7	1	0.9	-	0.7	-	0.9	-	5
Cuanza Norte	60.7	3	32.5	2	1.2	-	1.7	-	1.3	-	5
Cuanza Sul	68.0	4	27.2	1	0.9	-	1.0	-	1.4	-	5
Cunene	82.9	5	14.4	-	0.6	-	0.5	-	0.7	-	5
Huambo	56.9	3	39.0	2	0.9	-	0.7	-	0.9	-	5
Huíla	69.2	4	27.2	1	0.8	-	0.6	-	0.9	-	5
Luanda	33.3	2	62.6	3	0.5	-	0.9	-	1.0	-	5
Lunda Norte	56.3	3	33.6	2	5.5	-	1.3	-	0.9	-	5
Lunda Sul	52.5	3	34.4	2	10.6	-	0.6	-	0.6	-	5
Malanje	61.2	3	32.9	2	1.4	-	1.0	-	1.3	-	5
Moxico	68.0	4	26.6	1	2.0	-	1.0	-	0.8	-	5
Namibe	65.6	4	30.7	1	0.7	-	0.6	-	0.7	-	5
Uíge	57.6	3	35.3	2	1.4	-	1.9	-	1.3	-	5
Zaire	36.3	2	52.1	3	0.8	-	7.3	-	1.0	-	5
Overseas Angolans	50.5	-	46.8	-	0.2	-	0.6	-	0.8	-	-
Nationwide		67		57		2		2		2	130
Total	51.2	124	44.0	90	1.1	2	1.1	2	1.0	2	220
Source: National Electoral Commission

== Reactions ==
The United States urged all parties to express themselves peacefully and resolve grievances in accordance with the law.

The European Union said stakeholders should use legal remedies to address their concerns and called on the authorities to respond to them fairly and transparently.

The Portuguese Communist Party congratulated the MPLA on the victory and stated that they have the minimum support needed to govern. They warned of "interference operations from Portugal".

The Left Bloc in Portugal considered the results to be a serious warning to the MPLA regime, despite obtaining the majority.

Chega considered the elections a wasted opportunity for change and condemned the MPLA-led government for not alleviating poverty, corruption, and for the slow rates of development in Angola. They have also criticised the presence of Marcelo Rebelo de Sousa at ex-president Santos' funeral.

Namibian president and SADC chair Hage Geingob congratulated president Lorenço and the MPLA on their re-election. Geingob praised the electoral process as peaceful and "consistent with the revised SADC principles and guidelines governing democratic elections and the relevant laws of Angola".

== Aftermath ==
UNITA rejected the results and stated it would challenge them. The party complained about a lack of transparency and results not matching their own tallies. In Angola, election results can be disputed by lodging a complaint with the National Electoral Commission, and if rejected, they can then be brought to the Constitutional Court which must rule within 72 hours.

Lourenço pledged to continue with reforms, including privatising state assets and stopping corruption after investigating the Dos Santos family. He also promised to diversify the economy, create more jobs, modernize education and expand the healthcare system. He says that MPLA won legitimately and that the election was free, fair and transparent.

Several vehicles were set on fire and ten people injured when MPLA supporters attacked a UNITA office on 3 September 2022.

After the Constitutional Court rejected the appeal of the results, UNITA called for public protests against the MPLA.
