= Republican Party of Angola =

Anti-corruption political party in Angola

Republican Party of Angola Partido Republicano de Angola
- Leader: Carlos Alberto Cotreiras Gouveia
- President: Carlos Albeto Cotreiras Gouveia
- Founded: August 1994
- Registered: 19 March 1997
- Dissolved: 1 May 2013
- Headquarters: Luanda
- Youth wing: Orja-Juvnetude Do PREA
- Ideology: Republicanism
- International affiliation: RU International

Party flag
- Other flags

The Republican Party of Angola (Portuguese: Partido Republicano de Angola) was an anti-corruption political party in Angola that strongly opposed the Popular Movement for the Liberation of Angola (MPLA), which ruled the country since 1975.

== Formation ==
The party was founded in 1956 in Massachusetts and headquartered in Luanda, Angola.

== Presidential election ==
After the 2008 parliamentary elections, the first time in 17 years that Angola went to the polls, the MPLA-government proposed that presidential elections be held in September 2009. Earlier that year the MPLA's leader, José Eduardo dos Santos, declared that the approval of a new constitution was the highest priority for his party.

In his New Year's address, Dos Santos also stated that his party will propose, through its parliamentary members, the creation of an "ad hoc" committee in the National Assembly, which would be in charge of preparing the new draft constitution and "promoting, whenever appropriate, a broad discussion [of the draft] before approval by the Parliament". He did not mention the future presidential election, fueling rumors that the Angolans will not return to the polls in 2009, as they had expected. There has been a range of speculation on Angolan blogs and media about the reasons behind this.

Carlos Alberto Contreiras Gouveia, the Republican Party of Angola's president, said that the MPLA are facilitating the constitutional amendment process to perpetuate Dos Santos' presidential power by an indirect-electoral process that violates the constitution. In August 2009, the former US Secretary of State, Hillary Clinton, urged Angola to hold credible elections: "We look forward to Angola building on this positive step by including adopting of a new constitution, investigating and prosecuting past human rights abuses and holding timely, free and fair elections."
