= Florbela Malaquias =

Angolan lawyer and politician

President of the Humanist Party of Angola
- Incumbent
- Assumed office 21 December 2020

Member of the National Assembly
- Incumbent
- Assumed office 24 August 2022

Personal details
- Born: 26 January 1959 (age 67) Luso, Portuguese Angola
- Party: Humanist Party of Angola (since 2022)
- Other political affiliations: UNITA (until 1983)
- Education: Agostinho Neto University

Florbela Catarina "Bela" Malaquias (born 26 January 1959) is an Angolan journalist, lawyer and politician who is the leader of the Humanist Party of Angola.

== Early life ==
Malaquias was born in Luso, Portuguese Angola. Despite growing up during a turbulent time in Angolan and African history, given the rise of several national liberation movements, she described her childhood as generally "very quiet" and "happy." Her father, Nelson, was a railway clerk for Benguela railway and was a supporter of Angolan independence. He was arrested several times by the colonial police, PIDE-DGS, for expressing these views, and was part of one of the first cells of UNITA in what is now Moxico Province. As her father was transferred from jail to jail, passing through Nova Lisboa and Missombo, Malaquias, her five brothers, and her mother, Amelia, eventually followed him when he was transferred to the open-air St. Nicholas prison centre in Namibe Province, a site often used to torture pro-independence activists and militants. Malaquias would also join UNITA early on in its history.

== Career ==
Malaquias fought for UNITA during the Angolan Civil War, even authoring the anthem of the Angolan Women's League, UNITA's women's wing. However, she later came to hold a strong negative opinion of UNITA leader Jonas Savimbi starting in the 1980s, whom she later stated was a "tyrant and murderer" for orchestrating "Red September", overseeing the torture and killing of dozens of people, including many of his own officers, their wives and children, in an anti-witchcraft ritual. She was the only female candidate for President of Angola in the 2022 Angolan general election. She came in 5th place, but was elected a member of the National Assembly. Malaquias has a degree in law from Agostinho Neto University.
