= Angolan League =

Angolan League Liga Angolana
- Founded: 1912
- Dissolved: 1922
- Ideology: interest of the native population of Portuguese colonial Angola

The Angolan League (Portuguese: Liga Angolana) was a political movement working for the interest of the native population of Portuguese colonial Angola. The organization was founded in 1912, directly after the proclamation of the Portuguese republic.

In 1922 the movement was banned.
