= Alexandre Sebastião André =

Angolan politician

Member of the National Assembly of Angola
- Incumbent
- Assumed office 28 September 2017

Personal details
- Party: CASA-CE

Alexandre Sebastião André "Asa" is an Angolan politician for the CASA–CE and a member of the National Assembly of Angola.

As of May 2018, he was the vice-president of CASA-CE.
