= Revolutionary Government of Angola in Exile =

Angolan self-proclaimed government-in-exile based in Léopoldville

The Revolutionary Government of Angola in Exile flew the flag of the National Liberation Front of Angola

The Revolutionary Government of Angola in Exile (Portuguese: Govêrno revolucionário de Angola no exílio, or GRAE) was a self-proclaimed government-in-exile based in Léopoldville (modern-day Kinshasa) in the Democratic Republic of the Congo during the Angolan War of Independence. It was led the National Liberation Front of Angola (Frente Nacional de Libertação de Angola, FNLA) and its president was Holden Roberto. The GRAE was founded in April 1962 and had its armed forces stationed in the Congo where it also conducted military training. Congolese aid to the GRAE was gradually reduced once Moïse Tshombe became prime minister. In July 1964, the Foreign Minister of GRAE, Jonas Savimbi, resigned (in 1966 he would form a movement of his own, UNITA).

Initially, GRAE forces fought mainly in the northern Dembo forests. However, in early 1969 GRAE opened a second front along the Zambian border.

== OAU recognition ==
When the Organization of African Unity was founded in 1963, GRAE was granted exclusive recognition as the legitimate government of Angola, a move which spurred the Congolese government to expel the MPLA forces (a rival liberation movement to FNLA) from its territory. However, in 1964 OAU also recognized MPLA as a legitimate liberation movement, and gradually support was reduced for GRAE. In the period 1971-1972 GRAE received 61,666 pounds sterling from the OAU, 5.69% of the total amounts donated by the OAU to different African liberation movements at the time. During the same period, OAU gave MPLA 180,334 pounds sterling.

== International linkages ==
GRAE constituted a bloc of African movements, together with the Pan-Africanist Congress (South Africa), Revolutionary Committee of Mozambique and Zimbabwe African National Union. Through this cooperation, GRAE gave some military assistance to its Mozambican counterpart. In the 1960s, GRAE received a large share of humanitarian aid for Angolan refugees from Western sources. GRAE was supported by China. GRAE did also receive some assistance from the Soviet bloc.

== See also ==
- Provisional Government of the Algerian Republic (1958–62)
