= Anália de Victória Pereira =

Angolan politician

Anália Maria Caldeira de Victória Pereira Simeão (3 October 1941 – 7 January 2009) was the leader of the PLD (the Partido Liberal Democrático, or "Liberal Democratic Party") of Angola and the most visible female politician in the country. She co-founded the PLD in 1983 while living in Portugal, and was its president until her death.
