= Ngola Kabangu =

Angolan Politician

Manuel Júlio Ngola Kabangu

President of the FNLA
- Incumbent
- Assumed office 11 November 2007
- Preceded by: Holden Roberto

Personal details
- Born: 14 February 1943 (age 82) Bairro Operário, Portuguese Angola
- Party: FNLA

Manuel Júlio Ngola Kabangu (born 14 February 1943) is an Angolan politician and the President of the National Liberation Front of Angola (FNLA), a political party in Angola. He succeeded Holden Roberto, who led the party from its formation until his death in August 2007.

Party members elected Kabangu as President of the FNLA with 791 points, triumphing over rivals Carlinhos Zassala, who received 65, and Miguel Damiao, who received 13 points. Neither Zassala nor Damiao attended the electoral commission's announcement ceremony on November 11, 2007 to protest alleged voting irregularities.

Kabangu was the first candidate on the FNLA's national list in the September 2008 parliamentary election and was one of three FNLA candidates to win seats in the National Assembly.
