= Humanist Party of Angola =

Humanist Party of Angola Partido Humanista de Angola
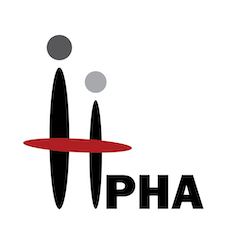
- Abbreviation: PHA
- President: Florbela Malaquias
- Founded: 21 December 2020
- Registered: 27 May 2022
- Split from: UNITA
- Headquarters: Rua Nelito Soares C7 de Baixo, N.26, Zona 14, Luanda
- Ideology: Universal humanism Feminism
- Political position: Centre-left
- International affiliation: Humanist International
- Colours: Black; Red; White
- National Assembly: 2 / 220

Party flag

Website
- humanistas.co

The Humanist Party of Angola (Portuguese: Partido Humanista de Angola, PHA) is a political party in Angola led by Florbela Malaquias. It was legalised by the Constitutional Court on 27 May 2022.

== History ==
The party won two seats in the National Assembly at the 2022 Angolan general election.

== Electoral history ==
=== Presidential elections ===
| Election | Party candidate | Votes | % | Result |
|---|---|---|---|---|
| 2022 | Florbela Malaquias | 63,749 | 1.02% | Lost ✗ |

=== National Assembly elections ===
| Election | Leader | Votes | % | Seats | +/– | Position | Government |
|---|---|---|---|---|---|---|---|
| 2022 | Florbela Malaquias | 63,749 | 1.02% | 2 / 220 | New | ▲5th | Opposition |
