= Social Renewal Party (Angola) =

Political party in Angola

Social Renewal Party Partido de Renovação Social
- President: Benedito Daniel
- Founder: Eduardo Kuangana
- Founded: 18 November 1990
- Headquarters: Rua nº1, Martires de Kifangondo n. 33 D, Luanda, Angola
- Youth wing: Social Renewal Youth
- Women's wing: Social Renewal Women's Union
- Ideology: Federalism; Progressivism
- Political position: Centre-left
- Slogan: Peace, Democracy, Progress
- Seats in the National Assembly: 2 / 220

Party flag

Website
- prsonline.ao prsangola.com (former)

The Social Renewal Party (Partido de Renovação Social) is a political party in Angola. The party was founded in 1991. It is mainly based within the Chokwe ethnic group. In the 1992 elections it won six seats.

In 1999 the party passed through a period of inner strife, in which four MPs were expelled from the party.

The PRS won 3.17% of the vote in the September 2008 parliamentary election, winning eight seats out of 220 seats. It performed particularly well in Lunda Sul and Lunda Norte provinces, although it still placed second behind the governing Popular Movement for the Liberation of Angola (MPLA) in those provinces.

The youth wing of the party is Social Renewal Youth (JURS).

== Electoral history ==
=== Presidential elections ===
Election	Party candidate	Votes	%	Result
1992	Rui Pereira	9,208	0.23%	Lost ✗
2012	Eduardo Kuangana	98,233	1.71%	Lost ✗
2017	Benedito Daniel	92,222	1.35%	Lost ✗
2022	Benedito Daniel	71,351	1.14%	Lost ✗

=== National Assembly elections ===
Election	Party leader	Votes	%	Seats	+/–	Position	Result
1992	Rui Pereira	89,875	2.27%	6 / 220	New	▲5th	Opposition
2008	Eduardo Kuangana	204,746	3.17%	8 / 220	▲2	▲3rd	Opposition
2012	Eduardo Kuangana	98,233	1.71%	3 / 220	▼5	▼4th	Opposition
2017	Benedito Daniel	92,222	1.35%	2 / 220	▼1	4th	Opposition
2022	Benedito Daniel	71,351	1.14%	2 / 220	0	▲3rd	Opposition
