= CASA–CE =

Angolan political party

Broad Convergence for the Salvation of Angola – Electoral Coalition Convergência Ampla de Salvação de Angola – Coligação Eleitoral
- Abbreviation: CASA-CE
- Leader: Manuel Fernandes
- Founder: Abel Chivukuvuku
- Founded: 2012
- Split from: UNITA
- National Assembly: 0 / 220
- Pan-African Parliament: 0 / 5

Party flag

Website
- http://casa-ce.org/

The Broad Convergence for the Salvation of Angola – Electoral Coalition (Portuguese: Convergência Ampla de Salvação de Angola – Coligação Eleitoral, CASA–CE) is a political alliance in Angola that currently includes two parties.

== History ==
The alliance was formed in March 2012 by Abel Chivukuvuku after he left UNITA and initially comprised 4 parties: the Angolan Free Alliance Majority Party (PALMA), the Party for Democracy and Development in Angola-Patriotic Alliance (PADDA-AP), the Angolan Pacific Party (PPA) and the National Salvation Party of Angola (PNSA). CASA–CE won eight seats in the 2012 National Assembly elections, making it the third largest faction in the National Assembly after the MPLA and UNITA. Ahead of the 2017 elections the Democratic Bloc (BD) and the Democratic Party for the Progress of the National Alliance of Angola (PDP–ANA) joined the alliance, that ended up doubling its representation to 16 seats.

In 2019 following an internal crisis its founder Abel Chivukuvuku was dismissed as leader and excluded from the alliance, with the leader of PADDA–AP André Mendes de Carvalho "Miau" taking its place. Two years later the leader of PALMA Manuel Fernandes taking was elected as a new leader by the coalition members. Later in 2021 BD announced its intention not to join again the coalition for the following legislative election, leading to the suspension of its membership. In the 2022 Angolan general election the coalition lost all its seats. In early 2024, the PADDA–AP, PNSA, and PDP–ANA left the coalition.

== Composition ==
CASA–CE is composed of the following parties:

=== Current members ===
Party	Abbr.	Leader	Ideology	Membership
Angolan Free Alliance Majority Party; Partido de Aliança Livre de Maioria Angolana	PALMA	Manuel Fernandes		2012–present
Angola Pacific Party; Partido Pacifico Angolano	PPA	Fele António		2012–present

=== Former members ===
Party	Abbr.	Leader	Ideology	Membership
Democratic Bloc; Bloco Democratico	BD	Filomeno Viera Lopes		2017–2019
Party for Democracy and Development in Angola – Patriotic Alliance; Partido de Apoio para Democracia e Desenvolvimento de Angola – Aliança Patriótica	PADDA–AP	Alexandre Sebastião André		2012–2024
National Salvation Party of Angola; Partido Nacional de Salvação de Angola	PNSA	Sikonda Lulendo Alexandre		2012–2024
Democratic Party for Progress – Angolan National Alliance Partido Democrático para o Progresso – Aliança Nacional Angolana	PDP–ANA	Simão Makazu		2017–2024

== Election results ==
=== Presidential elections ===
Election	Candidate	Votes	%	Result
2012	Abel Chivukuvuku	345,589	6.00%	Lost ✗
2017	Abel Chivukuvuku	643,961	9.45%	Lost ✗
2022	Manuel Fernandes	47,446	0.76%	Lost ✗

=== National Assembly elections ===
Election	Party leader	Votes	%	Seats	+/–	Position	Status
2012	Abel Chivukuvuku	345,589	6.00%	8 / 220	New	▲3rd	Opposition
2017	Abel Chivukuvuku	643,961	9.45%	16 / 220	▲8	3rd	Opposition
2022	Manuel Fernandes	47,446	0.76%	0 / 220	▼16	▼6th	Extra-parliamentary
