= Lucas Ngonda =

Angolan politician

Lucas Ngonda is an Angolan politician.

Ngonda has led one of two factions on the National Liberation Front of Angola (FNLA) since the division emerged in February 1999. He previously served as the FNLA spokesman.
