= Party of the Alliance of Youth, Workers and Farmers of Angola =

Political party in Angola

Party of the Alliance of Youth, Workers and Farmers of Angola Partido da Aliança Juventude, Operários e Camponeses de Angola
- Chairman: Alexandre Sebastião André
- Founded: January 1991

Party of the Alliance of Youth, Workers and Farmers of Angola (Pajoca, abbreviation of the Portuguese: Partido da Aliança Juventude, Operários e Camponeses de Angola) was an opposition party in Angola. The president of Pajoca was Alexandre Sebastião André and the general secretary was Jesus Kabanga. The party was founded in Luanda, on January 19, 1991. The party was founded by disillusioned MPLA cadres.

Pajoca favoured far-reaching autonomy for the enclave of Cabinda.

Ahead of the 1992 elections, Pajoca was officially registered after submitting 3,998 signatures, of which 2,372 were validated. The valid signatures came from ten provinces, with at least 100 signature from each province. In the 1992 legislative elections, Pajoca received 13,924 votes (0.35%) and won one seat in the National Assembly, occupied by Alexandre Sebastião André. In the presidential election, PAJOCA supported the People's Movement for the Liberation of Angola (MPLA).

In 1998 there was internal turmoil in Pajoca, with then president Sebastião Miguel Tetembwa expelling Alexandre Sebastião André. The first party congress was convened, which elected Alexandre Sebastião André as the new president. The congress also approved a new party constitution.

The women's organization of Pajoca is known as Organização da mulher do Pajoca - OMI-PA.
