= Democratic Party for Progress – Angolan National Alliance =

Political party in Angola

- Leader: Mfulumpinga Landu Victor (1991-2004); Francisco Lele
- Founded: March 1991

Party flag

The Democratic Party for Progress – Angolan National Alliance (Partido Democrático para o Progresso – Aliança Nacional Angolana) is a political party in Angola. The party was founded in Luanda, March 17, 1991. It was led by Mfulumpinga Landu Victor, a former National Liberation Front of Angola (FNLA) cadre and Member of Parliament for the PDP-ANA, until he was shot dead outside the party office in 2004. It is now led by Francisco Lele.

In the 2008 legislative elections, it gained 0.51% of the vote and no seats in the National Assembly.
