= Holden Roberto =

Angolan politician (1923–2007)

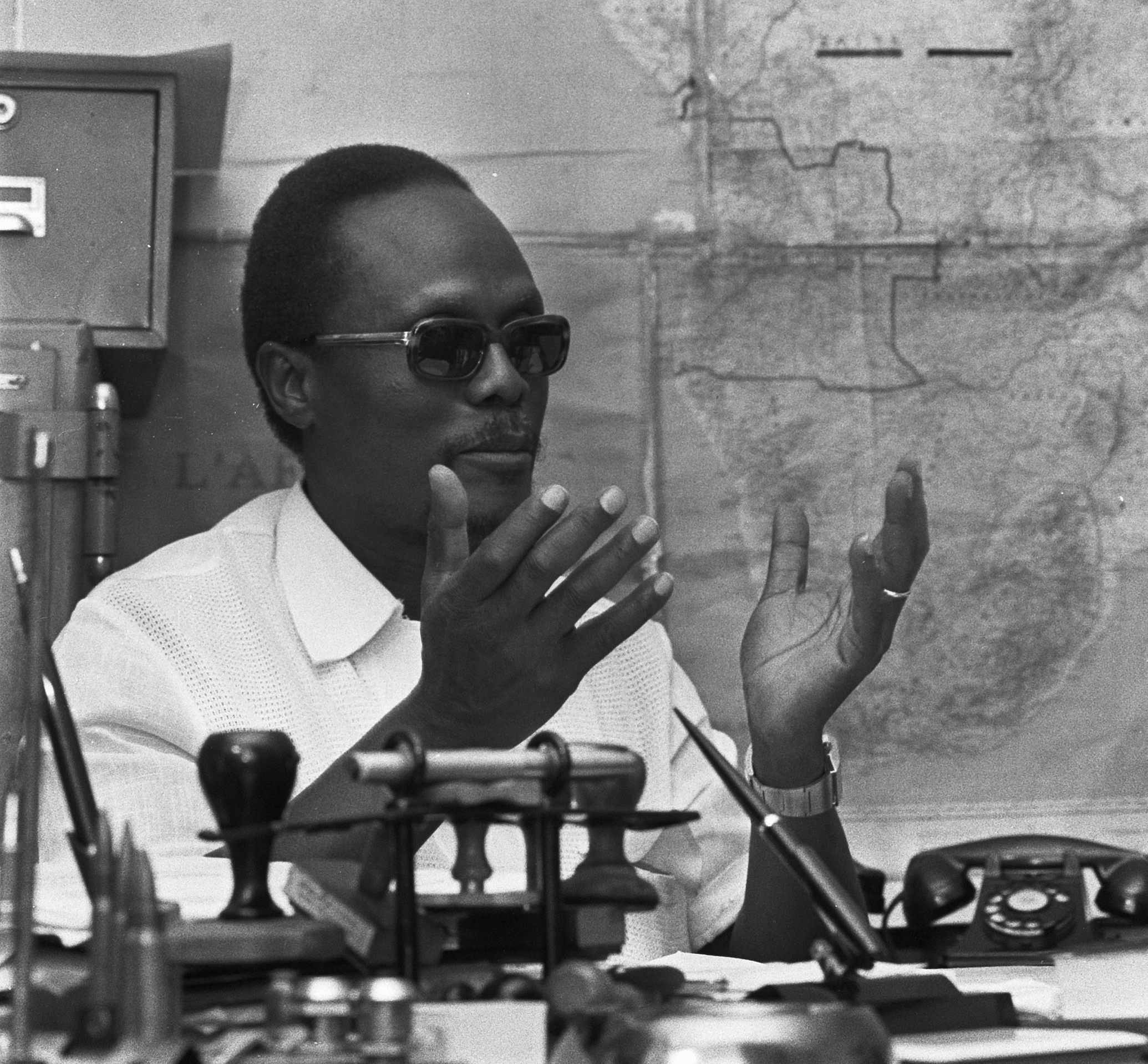
- Roberto in 1973

President of the FNLA
- In office 1954 – 2007; Until 1961 as the Union of Peoples of Angola
- Preceded by: Position established
- Succeeded by: Ngola Kabangu

President of the Democratic People's Republic of Angola (with Jonas Savimbi)
- In office 11 November 1975 – 11 February 1976
- Preceded by: Position established
- Succeeded by: Position abolished

President of the Revolutionary Government of Angola in Exile
- In office 5 April 1962 – 11 November 1975
- Preceded by: Position established
- Succeeded by: Himself as President of the Democratic People's Republic.

Personal details
- Born: Álvaro Holden Necaca Roberto Diasiwa; 12 January 1923 São Salvador, Portuguese Angola (now M'banza-Kongo, Angola)
- Died: 2 August 2007 (aged 84) Luanda, Angola
- Children: 8

Álvaro Holden Necaca Roberto Diasiwa (Angolan Portuguese pronunciation: [ˈal.va.ɾu ˈolden ɾoˈbeʁtu]; 12 January 1923 – 2 August 2007) was an Angolan politician who founded and led the National Liberation Front of Angola (FNLA) from 1962 to 1999.

== Early life ==
Son of Roberto Garcia Diasiwa and Ana Joana Helena Lala Necaca, and a descendant of the royal family of the Kongo Kingdom, Álvaro Holden Necaca Roberto Diasiwa was born in São Salvador in the far north of Angola. His family moved to Léopoldville, in the Belgian Congo, in 1925. In 1940, he graduated from a Baptist mission school. He worked for the Belgian Finance Ministry in Léopoldville, Costermansville, and Stanleyville for eight years. In 1949, Roberto moved back to Léopoldville, where he joined his uncle in playing for the local "Nomads" football side. Roberto went on to play for Daring Club Motema Pembe, alongside the later Congolese Prime Minister, Cyrille Adoula. In 1951, he visited Angola and witnessed Portuguese officials abusing an old man, inspiring him to begin his political career.

== Political career ==
On 14 July 1954, Roberto and Manuel Ventura Barros Sidney Necaca founded the Union of Peoples of Northern Angola (UPNA), later renamed the Union of Peoples of Angola (UPA). Roberto, serving as UPA President, represented Angola in the All-African Peoples Congress of Ghana which he secretly attended in Accra, Ghana in December 1958. There he met Patrice Lumumba, the future Prime Minister of the Democratic Republic of the Congo, Kenneth Kaunda, the future President of Zambia, and Kenyan nationalist Tom Mboya. He acquired a Guinean passport and visited the United Nations. Jonas Savimbi, the future leader of UNITA, joined the UPA in February 1961 at the urging of Mboya and Kenyan Prime Minister Jomo Kenyatta. Later that year Roberto appointed Savimbi Secretary-General of the UPA.

The United States National Security Council began giving Roberto aid in the 1950s, paying him $6,000 annually until 1962 when the NSC increased his salary to $10,000 for intelligence-gathering. A document produced by The State Department's Bureau of Intelligence and Research's (INR) on March 6, 1967, states that the "CIA has had a relationship with Roberto since 1955".

== National Liberation Front of Angola ==
After visiting the United Nations, he returned to Kinshasa and organized Bakongo militants. He launched an incursion into Angola on 15 March 1961, leading 4,000 to 5,000 militants. His forces took farms, government outposts, and trading centers, killing everyone they encountered. At least 1,000 whites and an unknown number of natives were killed. Commenting on the incursion, Roberto said, "this time the slaves did not cower". The men killed everyone in sight.

Roberto met with United States President John F. Kennedy on 25 April 1961. When he applied for aid later that year from the Ghanaian government, President Kwame Nkrumah turned him down on the grounds that the U.S. government was already paying him. Roberto merged the UPA with the Democratic Party of Angola to form the FNLA in March 1962, and a few weeks later established the Revolutionary Government of Angola in Exile (GRAE) on 27 March, appointing Savimbi to the position of Foreign Minister. Roberto established a political alliance with Zairian President Mobutu Sese Seko by divorcing his wife and marrying a woman from Mobutu's wife's village. Roberto visited Israel in the 1960s and received aid from the Israeli government from 1963 to 1969.

Savimbi left the FNLA in 1964 and founded UNITA in response to Roberto's unwillingness to spread the war outside the traditional Kingdom of Kongo.

Zhou Enlai, Premier of the People's Republic of China, invited Roberto to visit the PRC in 1964. Roberto did not go because Moise Tshombe, the President of Katanga, told him he would not be allowed to return to the Congo.

On the eve of Angola's independence from Portugal, Zaire, in a bid to install a pro-Kinshasa government and thwart the People's Movement for the Liberation of Angola's (MPLA) drive for power, deployed armored car units, paratroops, and three battalions to Angola. However, the FNLA and Zaire's victory was narrowly averted by a massive influx of Cuban forces, who resoundingly defeated them.

In 1975, the MPLA defeated the FNLA in the Battle of Quifangondo and the FNLA retreated to Zaire.

While Roberto and Agostinho Neto's proposed policies for an independent Angola were similar, Roberto drew support from western Angola and Neto drew from eastern Angola. Neto, under the banner of nationalism and communism, received support from the Soviet Union while Roberto, under the banner of nationalism and anti-communism, received support from the United States, China, and Zaire. Roberto staunchly opposed Neto's drive to unite the Angolan rebel groups in opposition to Portugal because Roberto believed the FNLA would be absorbed by the MPLA. The FNLA abducted MPLA members, deported them to Kinshasa, and killed them.

In 1991, the FNLA and MPLA agreed to the Bicesse Accords, allowing Roberto to return to Angola. He ran unsuccessfully for president, receiving only 2.1% of the vote. However, the FNLA won five seats in Parliament but refused to participate in the government.

Roberto died on 2 August 2007, at his home in Luanda. After Roberto's death, President José Eduardo dos Santos eulogized, "Holden Roberto was one of the pioneers of national liberation struggle, whose name encouraged a generation of Angolans to opt for resistance and combat for the country's independence," and released a decree appointing a commission to arrange for a funeral ceremony. Upon his death, he left an unfinished memoir.
