= Angolan Democratic Forum =

- Leader: Pablo Tchipilica; Miguel N'Zau Puna; Tony da Costa Fernandes
- Chairman: Jorge Rebelo Pinto Chikoti
- Split from: UNITA

Party flag

The Angolan Democratic Forum (Fórum Democrático Angolano) was a political party in Angola. The party was formed by UNITA dissidents in Canada. The chairman of FDA was Jorge Rebelo Pinto Chikoti. The FDA aligned with the Democratic Reflexion Tendency (TRD), which was then not constituted as a formal party. Leaders of TRD included Pablo Tchipilica, Miguel N'Zau Puna (former general secretary of UNITA) and Tony da Costa Fernandes.

FDA participated in the 1992 parliamentary election. Many TDR members were on its lists. The party obtained 12,038 votes (0.3%) and one seat in the National Assembly (Miguel N'Zau Puna). When Puna was nominated ambassador of Angola in Canada in 1997, his parliament seat was taken over by António Dias da Silva. In 2006, Dias da Silva was expelled from the parliament.

FDA has ceased to function, but TRD continues to exist.

== Sources ==
- unhcr.org
- rtp.pt
- rubelluspetrinus.com.sapo.pt
