= Democratic Angola – Coalition =

- Chairman: Evidor Quiela
- Founded: 1992
- Dissolved: 2013

Party flag

Democratic Angola – Coalition (Portuguese: Angola Democrática – Coligação, also known as AD–Coligação) was an alliance of political parties in Angola. The leading force in AD–Coligação was the Front for Democracy (FpD). The president of the alliance was Evidor Quiela. The alliance was formed in 1992.

In the 1992 parliamentary election AD–Coligação won one seat in the national assembly, with 0.86% of the national vote. The seat is held by João Vieira Lopes, from the FpD. The presidential candidate of AD–Coligação was Simão Cassete, who got 0,67% of the votes. Cassete left Angola after the elections, and was then the representative of FpD in Europe.

== Sources ==
- UNHCR
