= National Liberation Front of Angola =

Political party in Angola

National Liberation Front of Angola Frente Nacional de Libertação de Angola
- Abbreviation: FNLA
- President: Nimi Ya Simbi
- Founder: Holden Roberto
- Founded: 1954 (UPNA guerrilla); 1959 (UPA guerrilla); 1961 (FNLA guerrilla); 1992 (FNLA party)
- Headquarters: Luanda, Republic of Angola
- Youth wing: Youth of the National Liberation Front of Angola (JFLNA)
- Women's wing: Angolan Women's Association (AMA)
- Armed wing: National Liberation Army of Angola (ELNA) (until 1978)
- Ideology: Civic nationalism Christian democracy Conservatism
- Political position: Centre-right
- Seats in the National Assembly: 2 / 220

Party flag

Website
- www.fnla.co.ao (archived)

The National Front for the Liberation of Angola (Portuguese: Frente Nacional de Libertação de Angola; abbreviated FNLA) is a political party and former militant organisation that fought for Angolan independence from Portugal in the war of independence, under the leadership of Holden Roberto.

Founded in 1954 as the União dos Povos do Norte de Angola guerrilla movement, it was known after 1959 as the União dos Povos de Angola (UPA) guerrilla movement, and from 1961 as the FNLA guerrilla movement.

Ahead of the first multiparty elections in 1992, the FNLA was reorganized as a political party. The FNLA received 2.4% of the votes and had five Members of Parliament elected. In the 2008 parliamentary election, the FNLA received 1.11% of the vote, winning three out of 220 seats.

== History ==
=== Origin ===
In 1954, the United People of Northern Angola (UPNA) was formed as a separatist movement for the Bakongo tribe who wished to re-establish its 16th-century feudal kingdom but was also a protest movement against forced labour. Holden Roberto was to be the king of that land.

By 1958, the organisation's name had been changed to the "União das Populações de Angola" (UPA) under Holden Roberto from São Salvador, Bakongo, Northern Angola. The new organisation was described as an ethnic political movement. In March 1961, the UPA began an uprising in the north massacring thousands of white settlers and their servants, most of the Bailundo southern ethnicity, "assimilados", African Catholics and tribal members other than the Bakongo tribe, men, women and children. The Portuguese government responded by sending soldiers to Angola and more than 50,000 people died in the violence by the end of 1961. It was said more than a million refugees fled the north of Angola for Zaire.

In an attempt to become a national political movement, it merged with the "Partido Democratico de Angola" (PDA) to form the "Frente Nacional de Libertação de Angola" (FNLA). By February 1962, the FNLA had merged into an organisation called the Angolan Revolutionary Government in Exile (GRAE) with Roberto as its President and Jonas Savimbi as its foreign minister, based in Kinshasa, Zaire. It was recognised by the Organisation of African Unity (OAU) as Angola's only freedom movement until 1971. Its core membership were Angolan refugees and expatriates in Zaire.

=== Foreign aid ===
The United States government began aiding the FNLA in 1961 during the Kennedy administration and rerouted one-third of its official aid to Zaire to the FNLA and UNITA organisations. Over the course of many years, the governments of Algeria, Tunisia, West Germany, Ghana, Israel, France, Romania, the People's Republic of China, South Africa, the United States, Zaire, and Liberia actively supported and aided the FNLA. The French government supplied men and loaned one million pounds sterling without interest. The Israeli government gave aid to the FNLA between 1963 and 1969. Holden Roberto visited Israel during the 1960s, and FNLA members were sent to Israel for training. During the 1970s, the Israeli government shipped arms to the FNLA through Zaire. The People's Republic of China supplied the FNLA with military equipment and at least 112 military advisers in 1974.

=== Break up of GRAE ===
By July 1964, GRAE's right as the only liberation movement was challenged with the resignation of the Congolese Prime Minister Cyrille Adoula, their backer, and the departure of Jonas Savimbi, who went on to form his own liberation movement UNITA because of Roberto's dictatorial leadership, unwillingness to accept non-western support and a lack of a political program. Roberto saw off a "coup d'état" in June 1965 by his defence minister and in November of the same year, his brother-in-law, Mobutu Sese Seko, took control of the Congo (later Zaire) in a coup. But by 1968, GRAE's unity had begun to disintegrate.

=== Nixon's policy to Angola ===
After Richard Nixon assumed office in 1969, Nixon ordered a review of the United States policy towards Angola, Rhodesia, and South Africa. In January 1970, the National Security Council's Study Memorandum 39 was adopted, which acknowledged that the white regimes in those countries should not be politically and economically isolated and that engaging them was the best means of achieving changes in their systems. This meant a reduction in aid to the FNLA.

=== Coup in Portugal ===
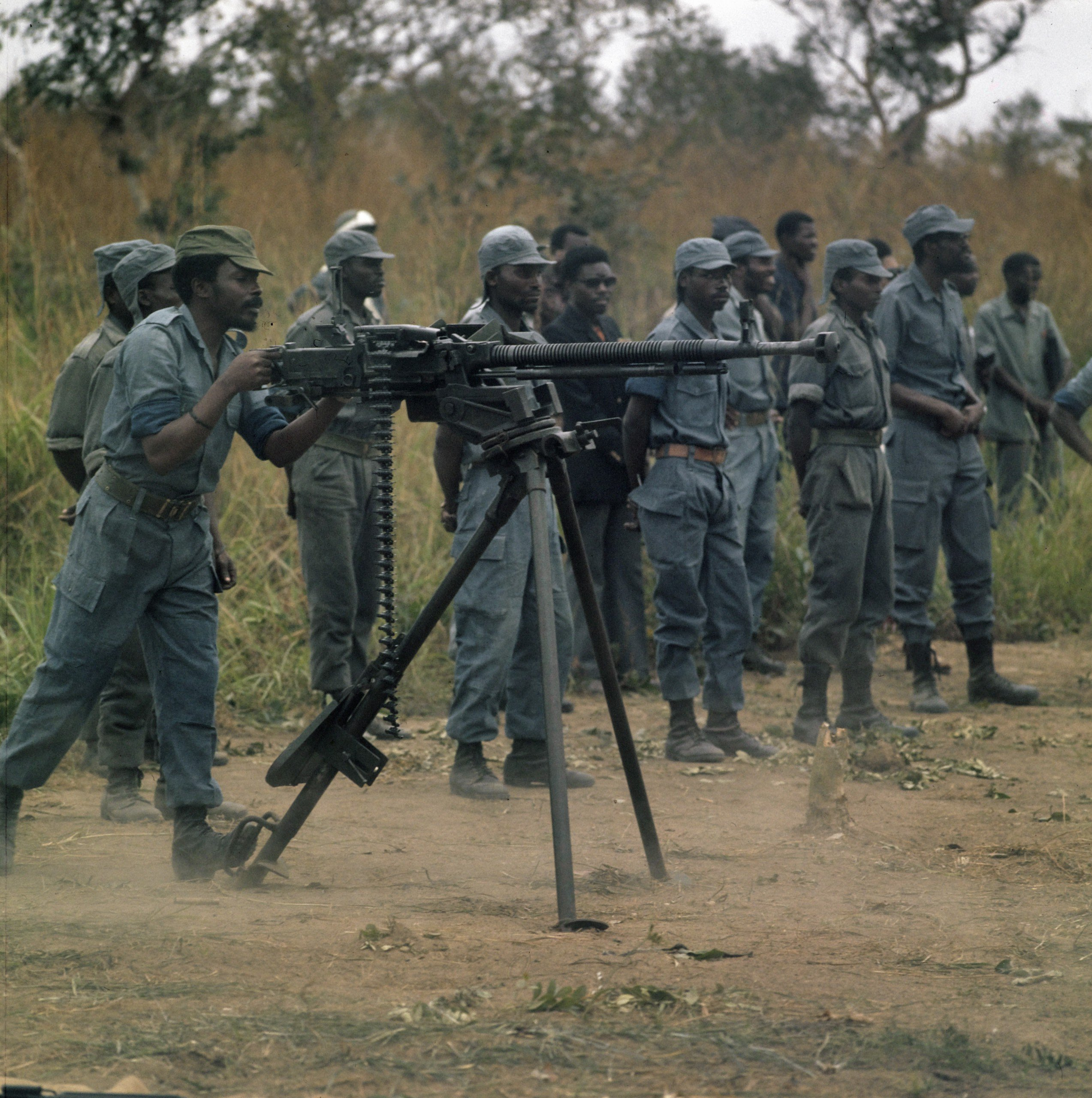
FNLA soldiers training in Zaire in 1973

In late 1972, the FNLA concluded a ceasefire with the MPLA, which was being attacked by the former in northwest Angola and by the Portuguese in the northeast. A condition of the ceasefire was it needed more arms as it had no US aid apart from Roberto's CIA retainer, and Neto spoke to the Tanzanians who interceded with the Chinese government. After all groups met the Chinese, the FNLA received military aid and training from early 1973 until the fall of 1974, and then only diplomatic aid thereafter. In April 1974, a military coup occurred in Portugal with a later announcement of future independence for its colonies which began the process by the FNLA, MPLA and UNITA in attempting to strengthen their reach throughout Angola and resulted in conflict amongst each other. The Romanian government delivered arms to the FNLA in August 1974. In August 1974, the Portuguese Angolan government had proposed a two-year plan for independence with the three groups and white settlers forming a coalition government but this was rejected outright. In order to end the conflict amongst the groups, individual ceasefires were arranged between the groups and the Portuguese Angolan Military Council, with the FNLA signing on 15 October 1974 that allowed it and the other three liberation parties to set up political offices in Luanda. By 25 November 1974, a ceasefire was concluded between the FNLA and UNITA and with the MPLA on 18 December.

=== Ford's policy to Angola ===
When Gerald Ford assumed the presidency in August 1974, the new US foreign policy moved away from the National Security Council Study Memorandum 39 to one of support for black rule in Angola as well as passive support for the white rule and so minimal aid was returned to the FNLA. But by November 1974, the US decided they did not want a future government dominated by the pro-Soviet MPLA so the CIA funded the FNLA with $300,000 to help it achieve that objective.

=== Africa's attempt to mediate ===
The increasing violence resulted in the gathering of the FNLA and the other two parties in Mombasa, Kenya, from 3–5 January 1975 by the invitation of President Jomo Kenyatta. The object of the meeting was to unite the parties and find common ground prior to the independence talks in Portugal later that month. Roberto speaking on behalf of all, declared an accord had been reached and that all parties had overcome their differences and had agreed firstly to a just and democratic society without ethnic discrimination; agreeing to a transitional government, armed forces and civil service and lastly to co-operate in the country's decolonisation and defence. The FNLA and the other parties met in Portimao, Portugal on 10 January 1975 and resulted in the formation of the Alvor Agreement, signed on 15 January 1975, which would grant Angola independence from Portugal on 11 November, ending the war of independence. The plan also called for a coalition government and a united army.

=== Transitional government's failure ===
Within 24 hours of the Alvor Agreement, fighting broke out in Luanda amongst the FNLA and MPLA with further violence on 23 March when the MPLAs Lopo do Nascimento was subject to an assassination attempt by the FNLA. The transitional government's failure to work was also said to be the result of a lack of interest by the Portuguese government in Angola as it tackled a failed counter-coup in Lisbon by General Spinola and the lack of will of the Portuguese troops to serve in Angola and end the violence between the MPLA and FNLA. The final straw was the dismissal in August of the Portuguese High Commissioner Antonio da Silva Cardoso whose attempt to reign in the MPLA had the support of the FNLA. The FNLA saw its only alternative as a military one after having been expelled from Luanda. On 29 August 1975, the Alvor Agreement was suspended by Portugal except for independence in November, and withdrawal of its troops that signal an escalation of violence for the control of Angola prior to that date.

=== US covert aid to the FNLA increases ===
The US government did not believe the Portuguese plan would work and that the MPLA would seize power and install a Soviet-backed regime in power. In late January 1975, the 40 Committee, part of the executive branch of the US government, met and reviewed a proposal from the CIA to fund the FNLA with $300,000 and UNITA, $100,000. The committee approved the funding for the FNLA but not for UNITA. The money was to be used by the FNLA to purchase newspapers and radio stations. In addition to the money, the US supplied weapons to Zaire which, in turn, passed them on to the FNLA, and also supplied several thousand troops. With this funding, Roberto believed any future coalition could be abandoned and in doing so the Soviet Union would begin to increase its aid to the MPLA. By June 1975, the CIA requested a meeting with the 40 Committee in which it proposed increased aid for the FNLA. A decision was not made for a month as the U.S. National Security Council (NSC) and U.S. State Department wished to consider the proposal. Assistant Secretary of State Nathaniel Davies objected to further aid, as he believed it would not help the FNLA to become as militarily strong as the MPLA except with massive amounts of money; escalate Soviet and Cuban involvement and feared South Africa would intervene and this would have negative diplomatic connotations for the United States in Africa, so the only option was a diplomatic solution. Henry Kissinger ensured that the NSC viewpoint prevailed and that aid, not diplomacy could prevent an MPLA win so aid of $14 million was approved for the FNLA and UNITA in July and that increased to $25 million in August and reached $32 million by September. The assistance became known as Operation IA Feature. The CIAs covert plan begun sending supplies to the FNLA through Zaire and Zambia and was able to supply by November 1975, 12 APC, 50 SAMs, 1000 mortars, 50,000 rifles and machine guns, 100,000 grenades, 25 million rounds of ammunition, 60 trucks, trailers, boats, radios, spare parts, medicine and food with training by retired US military advisors and five spotter planes as well as mercenaries. The CIA appointed John Stockwell to manage the Angolan Task Force but found that many members of the CIA doubted the FNLAs ability to beat the MPLA and this was confirmed when he visited Angola and discovered the lack of political support for the organisation and also feared any entry of South African forces in Angola would undermine the United States diplomatically in Africa.

=== South Africans enter the civil war ===
On the pretext of attacks around the Calueque hydroelectric facility, the South Africans army entered Angola to defend its interests in the facility and this action developed into Operation Savannah to assist the FNLA and UNITA to gain as much control of southern and central Angola prior to independence day in November. The US appeared to give the green light for the South Africans' covert invasion but this soon changed as their involvement became public knowledge, the US distanced themselves. The South Africans advanced close to Luanda from the south while a small force of South African artillery and advisors supported the FNLA in the north.

=== FNLA attacks Luanda ===
Without the control of Luanda on independence day, Roberto saw that the FNLA's international legitimacy would be in doubt. The only 'suitable' attack on Luanda was from the north through Quifangondo. Attacks were carried out by the FNLA on 5 and 8 November 1975 but were repulsed each time by the MPLA. With independence day looming on 11 November 1975, Roberto gave the final order to attack Quifangondo on 10 November unaware that the Cubans had reinforced the positions with troops and new Soviet equipment. Roberto claimed the South African were sending men to help him while the South Africans claimed they warned against a frontal assault but whatever the real story was, the FNLA's final assault on what became known as the Battle of Quifangondo failed disastrously. The MPLA retained Luanda, and Angola gained independence from the Portuguese High Commissioner with Neto declaring the People's Republic of Angola. The FNLA continued its fight inside Angola for another four months.

=== US aid ceases ===
On 6 November 1975, CIA Director William Colby appeared before the Senate Foreign Relations Committee and briefed them that his organisation had not informed the committee fully on its activities in Angola and the following day, the New York Times released the testimony to the world. By 26 November, Nigeria, against U.S. wishes, had recognised the MPLA government and soon convinced twenty-two other African nations to recognise them too. By December, President Ford and Kissinger decided that the aid to the opposition parties should not be abandoned and the CIA was ordered to draw up further aid plans which would need Senate approval but meanwhile, the Senate Foreign Relations Committee drew up the Clark Amendment, named after Senator Dick Clark, after his visit to Angola. He concluded that the White House and CIA had lied about their involvement and that the US effort was responsible for dragging the Cubans and South Africans into the country's conflict. The State Department and CIA, unable to stay on message, were unable to convince the House or Senate and on 19 December 1975, the Clark Amendment passed the Senate and covert US aid in Angola ended with the House following suit on 27 January 1976.

=== FNLA retreats from Angola ===
The MPLA and Cubans maintained the initiative in Northern Angola after the defeat of the FNLA at Quifangondo with the advances on Caxito and the latter's airbases at Camabatela and Negage. Caxito fell on 27 December 1975 and the FNLAs main airbase at Camabatela was captured on 1 January and Negage on 3 January while their capital at Carmona fell on 4 January and so the FNLA rout began in earnest. By early 1976, defeated by the MPLA, the FNLA began retreating, looting villages in northern Angola, as they headed for the Zairian border. On 11 January 1976, FAPLA and the Cubans captured Ambriz and Ambrizete from the FNLA and then advanced on their headquarters at São Salvador its route defended by foreign mercenaries under Colonel Callan and elements of the FNLA. With Colonel Callan committing atrocities in the fighting including against his own men he was stripped of his command in the FNLA and so mercenary support which had begun the previous December ended and São Salvador was captured on 15 February 1976. The South Africans withdrew from Angola on 27 March 1976 after receiving guarantees from Angola and United Nations on the safety of the installations at the Calueque hydroelectric facility so ending Operation Savannah. Elements of the FNLA that had taken part as South African army's Task Force Zulu, was reformed into 32 Battalion.

=== Military demise of the FNLA ===
On 29 February 1976, the Angolan President Agostinho Neto and Zairian President Mobuto Sese Seko met in Brazzaville to sign a non-aggression pact which was meant to see the end of Angola's support for Katangese rebels in their country while the Zairians promised to expel both the FNLA and UNITA from bases in Zaire but the deal did not hold and the Shaba I invasion occurred in March 1977. The Shaba II invasion of the Zairian Shaba Province in May 1978, by separatists based in eastern Angola, was the beginning of the end for the FNLA based in Zaire. The Angolan President Neto and Zairian President Mobuto Sese Seko met again in Brazzaville during June 1978 where a reconciliation pact was signed between the two countries. The result of this pact saw Holden Roberto exiled to Gabon by the Zairian President in November 1979 while he was in France for medical treatment. Elements of the FNLA continued the fight after Roberto left, now called the FNLA-COMIRA (Angolan Military Resistance Committee) but ceased to exist by 1983.

== Electoral history ==
=== Presidential elections ===
| Election | Party candidate | Votes | % | Result |
|---|---|---|---|---|
| 1992 | Holden Roberto | 83,135 | 2.11% | Lost ✗ |
| 2012 | Lucas Ngonda | 65,163 | 1.13% | Lost ✗ |
| 2017 | Lucas Ngonda | 63,658 | 0.93% | Lost ✗ |
| 2022 | Nimi Ya Simbi | 66,337 | 1.06% | Lost ✗ |

=== National Assembly elections ===
| Election | Party leader | Votes | % | Seats | +/– | Position | Result |
|---|---|---|---|---|---|---|---|
| 1992 | Holden Roberto | 94,742 | 2.40% | 5 / 220 | New | ▲4th | Opposition |
| 2008 | Ngola Kabangu | 71,416 | 1.11% | 3 / 220 | ▼2 | 4th | Opposition |
| 2012 | Lucas Ngonda | 65,163 | 1.13% | 2 / 220 | ▼1 | ▼5th | Opposition |
| 2017 | Lucas Ngonda | 63,658 | 0.93% | 1 / 220 | ▼1 | 5th | Opposition |
| 2022 | Nimi Ya Simbi | 66,337 | 1.06% | 2 / 220 | ▲1 | ▲4th | Opposition |

== See also ==
- Revolutionary Government of Angola in Exile
- African independence movements
- Luanda Trial
- "Colonel" Callan
- Charlie Christodoulou
- Peter McAleese, Angolan War mercenary
- Angolan Civil War
- Lucas Ngonda
