= Social Democratic Party (Angola) =

Political party in Angola

Social Democratic Party Partido Social-Democrata
- Leader: Bengui Pedro João
- Founded: November 1988
- Dissolved: 1 May 2013
- Ideology: Social democracy
- Political position: Centre-left

Party flag

The Social Democratic Party (Portuguese: Partido Social-Democrata) was a political party in Angola. The party was founded in Luanda on November 16, 1988. The party was led by Bengui Pedro João.

== Sources ==
- UNHCR.org: Social Democratic Party (Angola)
