= Liberal Democratic Party (Angola) =

Political party in Angola

Liberal Democratic Party Partido Liberal Democrático
- Leader: Anália de Victória Pereira
- Founder: Anália de Victória Pereira
- Founded: 1983
- Dissolved: 2013
- Ideology: Liberalism
- International affiliation: Liberal International

Party flag
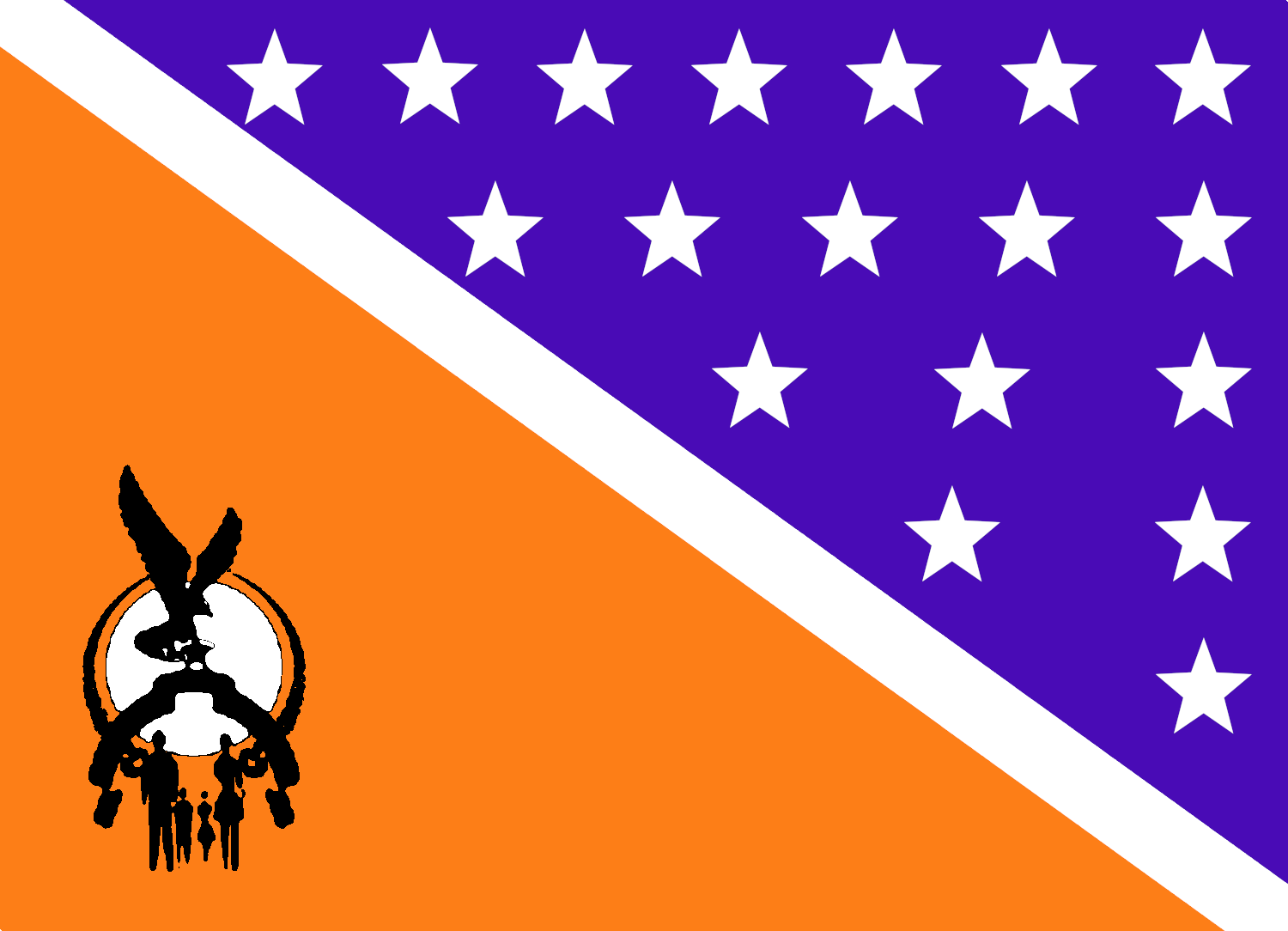

Website
- Liberal Democratic Party official website (down)

The Liberal Democratic Party (Portuguese: Partido Liberal Democrático) was a liberal party in Angola, and a member of Liberal International. In the 1992 elections, the PLD won 2.4% of the vote, gaining three seats in parliament. However, in the 2008 legislative election, the party gained only 0.33% of the vote and no seats in Parliament. The party's founder and leader was Anália de Victória Pereira.
