= Angolan National Democratic Party =

Political party in Angola

Angolan National Democratic Party Partido Nacional Democrático Angolano
- Abbreviation: PNDA
- Chairman: Geraldo Pereira João da Silva
- General Secretary: Pedro João António

Party flag
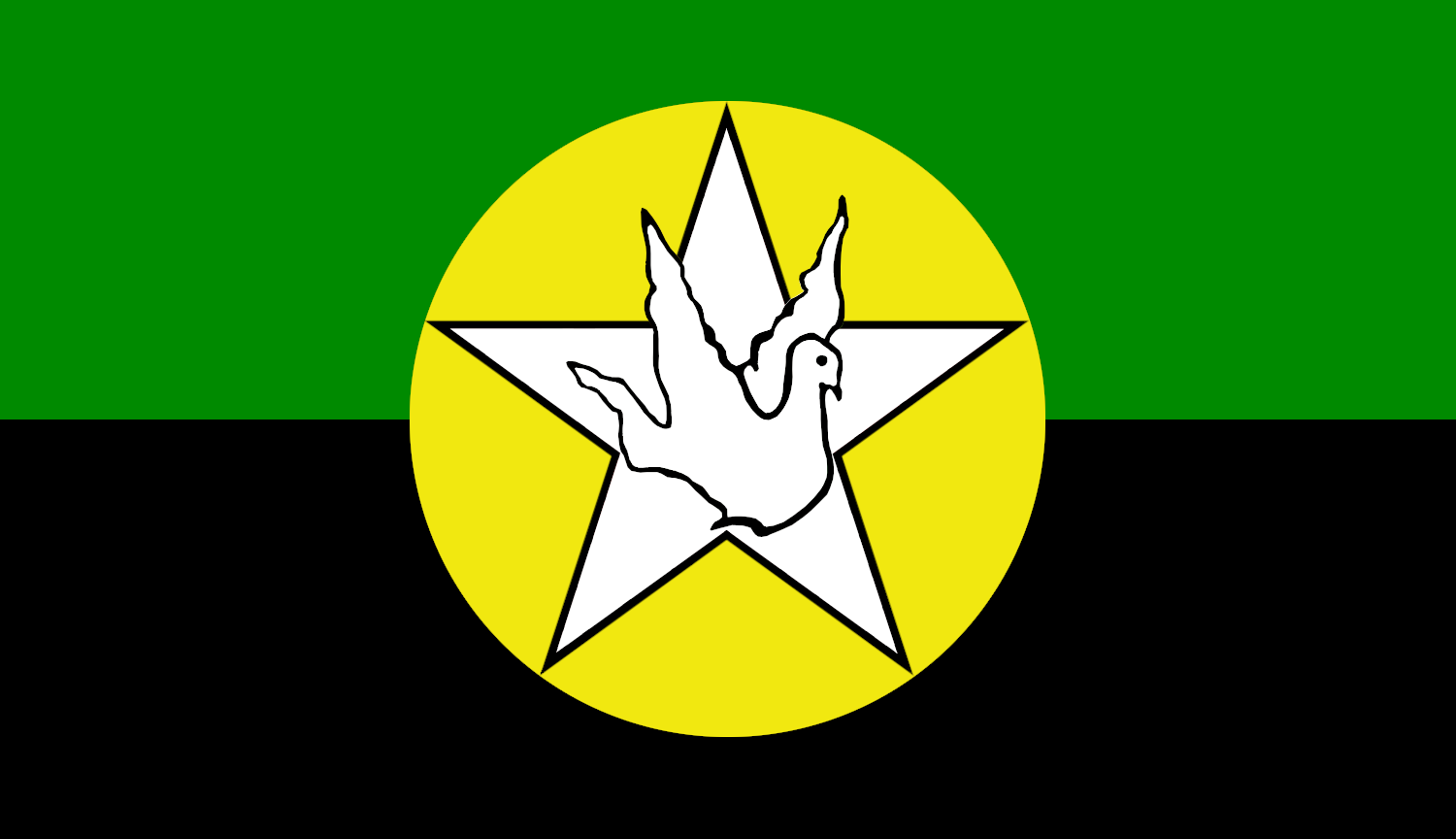

The Angolan National Democratic Party (Partido Nacional Democrático Angolano) was a political party in Angola. The chairman of the party was Geraldo Pereira João da Silva and the general secretary was Pedro João António. In the 1992 presidential election the party supported the independent candidate Daniel Julio Chipenda.

In 1997 the party passed through some internal strife, at the time of its first national conference.

The party was dissolved in 2013.
