= Democratic Renewal Party (Angola) =

Political party in Angola

- Chairman: Luis da Silva dos Passos
- Founded: December 1990
- Split from: MPLA

Party flag

The Democratic Renewal Party (Partido Renovador Democrático) is a political party in Angola. The party was founded on December 16, 1990. The founders of PRD had belonged to the leadership of MPLA, but were exiled during the purges that followed a failed coup in 1977. The chairman of the party is Luis da Silva dos Passos.

The PRD suffered some early setbacks. In April 1992 the then chairman of the party, Joaquim Pinto de Andrade, left it. Soon thereafter, in August of the same year, the General Secretary, Vicente Júnior, broke away.
