= 1990s in Angola =

Angola-related events during the 1990's

In the 1990s in Angola, the last decade of the Angolan Civil War (1975–2002), the Angolan government transitioned from a nominally communist state to a nominally democratic one, a move made possible by political changes abroad and military victories at home. Namibia's declaration of independence, internationally recognized on April 1, eliminated the southwestern front of combat as South African forces withdrew to the east. The MPLA abolished the one-party system in June and rejected Marxist-Leninism at the MPLA's third Congress in December, formally changing the party's name from the MPLA-PT to the MPLA. The National Assembly passed law 12/91 in May 1991, coinciding with the withdrawal of the last Cuban troops, defining Angola as a "democratic state based on the rule of law" with a multi-party system.

Observers met such changes with skepticism. American journalist Karl Maier wrote, "In the new Angola, ideology is being replaced by the bottom line, as security and selling expertise in weaponry have become a very profitable business. Michael Johns, The Heritage Foundation's primary Reagan Doctrine advocate and a key Savimbi advisor, described the Soviet Union and Cuba's diplomatic initiatives as "a perilous moment" and urged the U.S. to maintain military pressure on Angola's government through escalated support to UNITA in an effort to ensure the withdrawal of Soviet and Cuban troops and the establishment of free and fair elections.

== Savimbi wounded in combat ==
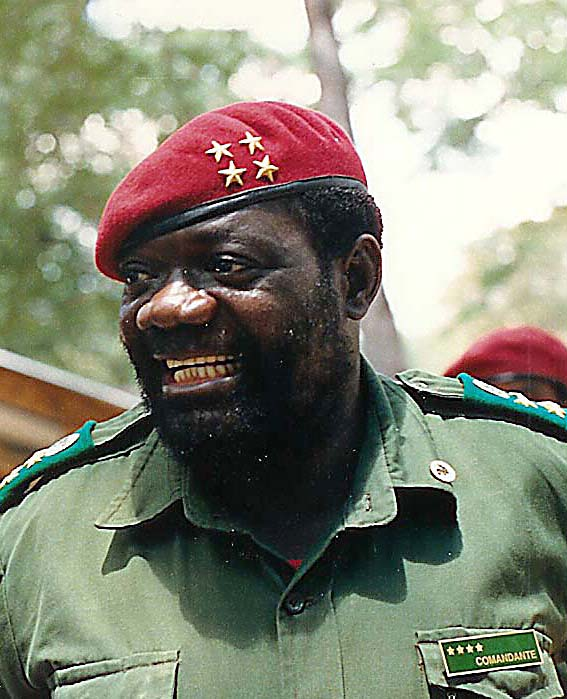
U.S.-supported UNITA leader Jonas Savimbi.

In early 1990, the MPLA sought to overrun UNITA militarily in southern Angola in several major military offensives, coordinated with Soviet and Cuban troops and military advisors. While UNITA ultimately repelled the offensives, Savimbi sustained bullet wounds twice in battles in January and February 1990, though they did not restrict his mobility In Washington, D.C., Savimbi's supporters warned that continued Soviet support for the MPLA was threatening U.S.-Soviet relations in global affairs and undermining Mikhail Gorbachev's promises of "new thinking" in Moscow's foreign policy. The Heritage Foundation's Michael Johns wrote that, "If there is 'new thinking' in Soviet foreign policy and if Gorbachev is, as he claims, very different from Leonid Brezhnev, then Moscow will call off the Angolan offensive. If not, then Gorbachev's 'new thinking' will fail its first regional test, forcing America to reconsider its new relaxed attitude toward the Soviet Union."

== Black, Manafort, Stone and Kelly ==
As Washington's role in the Angolan conflict grew, Savimbi retained Black, Manafort, Stone, and Kelly, an influential lobbying firm based in Washington, D.C., paying the firm US$5 million for government and public relations support on UNITA's behalf. Savimbi reaped huge rewards.

Senators Larry Smith and Dante Fascell, a senior member of the firm, worked with the Cuban American Negro Foundation, Representative Claude Pepper of Florida, Neal Blair's Free the Eagle, and Howard Phillips The Conservative Caucus to repeal the Clark Amendment in 1985. From the amendment's repeal in 1985 to 1992 the U.S. government gave Savimbi $60 million per year, a total of $300 million. A sizable amount of the aid went to Savimbi's personal expenses. Black, Manafort filed foreign lobbying records with the U.S. Justice Department showing Savimbi's expenses during his U.S. visits. During his December 1990 visit he spent $136,424 at the Park Hyatt hotel and $2,705 in tips. He spent almost $473,000 in October 1991 during his week-long visit to Washington and Manhattan. He spent $98,022 in hotel bills, at the Park Hyatt, $26,709 in limousine rides in Washington and another $5,293 in Manhattan. Paul Manafort, a partner in the firm, charged Savimbi $19,300 in consulting and additional $1,712 in expenses. He also bought $1,143 worth of "survival kits" from Motorola. When questioned in an interview in 1990 about human rights abuses under Savimbi, Charlie Black, a partner in the firm, said, "Now when you're in a war, trying to manage a war, when the enemy... is no more than a couple of hours away from you at any given time, you might not run your territory according to New Hampshire town meeting rules."

In December 1990, Savimbi returned to Washington, D.C., meeting with President George H. W. Bush and several of his key American advisors, the fourth of five trips he made to the United States.

== Bicesse Accords ==
President dos Santos met with Savimbi in Lisbon, Portugal and signed the Bicesse Accords, the first of three major peace agreements, on May 31, 1991, with the mediation of the Portuguese government. The accords laid out a transition to multi-party democracy under the supervision of the United Nations' UNAVEM II mission with a presidential election in a year. The agreement attempted to demobilize the 152,000 active fighters and integrate the remaining government troops and UNITA rebels into a 50,000-strong Angolan Armed Forces (FAA). The FAA would consist of a national army with 40,000 troops, navy with 6,000, and air force with 4,000. While UNITA largely did not disarm, the FAA complied with the accord and demobilized about half of its forces, leaving the government disadvantaged.

Angola held the first round of its 1992 presidential election on September 29–September 30. Dos Santos officially received 49.57% of the vote and Savimbi won 40.6%. As no candidate received 50% or more of the vote, election law dictated a second round of voting between the top two contenders. Savimbi, along with many other election observers, said the election had been neither free nor fair, but he sent Jeremias Chitunda, Vice President of UNITA, to Luanda to negotiate the terms of the second round. The election process broke down on October 31, when government troops in Luanda attacked UNITA. This began what was known as the Halloween Massacre. Civilians, using guns they had received from police a few days earlier, conducted house-by-house raids with the Rapid Intervention Police, killing and detaining hundreds of UNITA supporters. The government took civilians in trucks to the Camama cemetery and Morro da Luz ravine, shot them, and buried them in mass graves. On November 2, assailants attacked Chitunda's convoy, pulling him from his car and shooting him and two others dead. Confiscated by the Angolan military, the three bodies were never seen again.

=== Savimbi and UNITA return to war ===
Following the Chitunda killing, Savimbi questioned the legitimacy of the general election, announced that he was withdrawing from the run-off election, and led UNITA to war, scoring major military successes in 1993. On April 13, 1993, The New York Times reported that, "Nearly six months after the elections that were supposed to cement the peace in Angola, the rebel leader who lost in the vote has resumed the civil war and scored such enormous advances that there is talk he might engineer an outright military victory."

UNITA regained control over Caxito, Huambo, M'banza Kongo, Ndalatando, and Uíge, provincial capitals it had not held since 1976, and moved against Kuito, Luena, and Malange. Although the U.S. and South African governments had stopped aiding UNITA, supplies continued to come from Mobutu in Zaire. UNITA tried to wrest control of Cabinda from the MPLA in January 1993. Edward DeJarnette, Head of the U.S. Liaison Office in Angola for the Clinton Administration, warned Savimbi that, if UNITA hindered or halted Cabinda's production, the U.S. would end its support for UNITA. On January 9, UNITA began a 55-day-long battle over Huambo, the War of the Cities. Hundreds of thousands fled and 10,000 were killed before UNITA gained control on March 7. The government engaged in an ethnic cleansing of Bakongo, and, to a lesser extent Ovimbundu, in multiple cities, most notably Luanda, on January 22 in the Bloody Friday massacre. UNITA and government representatives met five days later in Ethiopia, but negotiations failed to restore the peace. The United Nations Security Council sanctioned UNITA through Resolution 864 on September 15, 1993, prohibiting the sale of weapons or fuel to UNITA. Perhaps the clearest shift in U.S. foreign policy emerged when President Clinton issued Executive Order 12865 on September 23, labeling UNITA a "continuing threat to the foreign policy objectives of the U.S.". By August 1993, UNITA had gained control over 70% of Angola, but the government's military successes in 1994 forced UNITA to sue for peace. By November 1994, the government had taken control of 60% of the country. Savimbi called the situation UNITA's "deepest crisis" since its creation.

== Lusaka Protocol ==
Savimbi, unwilling to personally sign an accord, had former UNITA Secretary General Eugenio Manuvakola represent UNITA in his place. Manuvakola and Angolan Foreign Minister Venancio de Moura signed the Lusaka Protocol in Lusaka, Zambia on October 31, 1994, agreeing to integrate and disarm UNITA. Both sides signed a ceasefire as part of the protocol on November 20. Under the agreement the government and UNITA would ceasefire and demobilize. 5,500 UNITA members, including 180 militants, would join the Angolan National police, 1,200 UNITA members, including 40 militants, would join the rapid reaction police force, and UNITA generals would become officers in the Angolan Armed Forces. Foreign mercenaries would return to their home countries and all parties would stop acquiring foreign arms. The agreement gave UNITA politicians homes and a headquarters. The government agreed to appoint UNITA members to head the Mines, Commerce, Health, and Tourism ministries, in addition to seven deputy ministers, ambassadors, the governorships of Uige, Lunda Sul, and Cuando Cubango, deputy governors, municipal administrators, deputy administrators, and commune administrators. The government would release all prisoners and give amnesty to all militants involved in the civil war. Zimbabwean President Robert Mugabe and South African President Nelson Mandela met in Lusaka on November 15, 1994, to boost support symbolically for the protocol. Mugabe and Mandela both said they would be willing to meet with Savimbi and Mandela asked him to come to South Africa, but Savimbi did not come. The agreement created a joint commission, consisting of officials from the Angolan government, UNITA, and the UN with the governments of Portugal, the United States, and Russia observing, to oversee its implementation. Violations of the protocol's provisions would be discussed and reviewed by the commission. The protocol's provisions, integrating UNITA into the military, a ceasefire, and a coalition government, were similar to those of the Alvor Agreement which granted Angola independence from Portugal in 1975. Many of the same environmental problems, mutual distrust between UNITA and the MPLA, loose international oversight, the importation of foreign arms, and an overemphasis on maintaining the balance of power, led to the protocol's collapse.

== Arms monitoring ==
In January 1995, United States President Bill Clinton sent Paul Hare, his envoy to Angola, to support the Lusaka Protocol and impress the importance of the ceasefire onto the Angolan government and UNITA, both in need of outside assistance. The United Nations agreed to send a peacekeeping force on February 8. Savimbi met with South African President Nelson Mandela in May. Shortly after, on June 18, the MPLA offered Savimbi the position of Vice President under dos Santos with another Vice President chosen from the MPLA. Savimbi told Mandela he felt ready to "serve in any capacity which will aid my nation," but he did not accept the proposal until August 12. The United States Department of Defense and Central Intelligence Agency's Angola operations and analysis expanded in an effort to halt weapons shipments, a violation of the protocol, with limited success. The Angolan government bought six Mil Mi-17 from Ukraine in 1995. The government bought L-39 attack aircraft from the Czech Republic in 1998 along with ammunition and uniforms from Zimbabwe Defence Industries and ammunition and weapons from Ukraine in 1998 and 1999. U.S. monitoring significantly dropped off in 1997 as events in Zaire, the Congo and then Liberia occupied more of the U.S. government's attention. UNITA purchased more than 20 FROG-7 scuds and three FOX 7 missiles from the North Korean government in 1999.

The UN extended its mandate on February 8, 1996. In March, Savimbi and dos Santos formally agreed to form a coalition government. The government deported 2,000 West African and Lebanese Angolans in Operation Cancer Two, in August 1996, on the grounds that dangerous minorities were responsible for the rising crime rate. In 1996 the Angolan government bought military equipment from India, two Mil Mi-24 attack helicopters and three Sukhoi Su-17 from Kazakhstan in December, and helicopters from Slovakia in March.

The international community helped install a Government of Unity and National Reconciliation in April 1997, but UNITA did not allow the regional MPLA government to take up residence in 60 cities. The UN Security Council voted on August 28, 1997, to impose sanctions on UNITA through Resolution 1127, prohibiting UNITA leaders from traveling abroad, closing UNITA's embassies abroad, and making UNITA-controlled areas a no-fly zone. The Security Council expanded the sanctions through Resolution 1173 on June 12, 1998, requiring government certification for the purchase of Angolan diamonds and freezing UNITA's bank accounts.

The UN spent $1.6 billion from 1994 to 1998 in maintaining a peacekeeping force. The Angolan military attacked UNITA forces in the Central Highlands on December 4, 1998, the day before the MPLA's fourth Congress. Dos Santos told the delegates the next day that he believed war to be the only way to ultimately achieve peace, rejected the Lusaka Protocol, and asked MONUA to leave. In February 1999, the Security Council withdrew the last MONUA personnel. In late 1998, several UNITA commanders, dissatisfied with Savimbi's leadership, formed UNITA Renovada, a breakaway militant group. Thousands more deserted UNITA in 1999 and 2000.

The Angolan military launched Operation Restore, a massive offensive, in September 1999, recapturing N'harea, Mungo and Andulo and Bailundo, the site of Savimbi's headquarters just one year before. The UN Security Council passed Resolution 1268 on October 15, instructing United Nations Secretary General Kofi Annan to update the Security Council to the situation in Angola every three months. Dos Santos offered an amnesty to UNITA militants on November 11. By December, Chief of Staff General João de Matos said the Angolan Armed Forces had destroyed 80% of UNITA's militant wing and captured 15,000 tons of military equipment. Following the dissolution of the coalition government, Savimbi retreated to his historical base in Moxico and prepared for battle.

== Diamonds ==
UNITA's success in mining diamonds and selling them abroad at an inflated price allowed the war to continue even as the movement's support in the Western world and among the local populace withered away. De Beers and Endiama, a state-owned diamond-mining monopoly, signed a contract allowing De Beers to handle Angola's diamond exportation in 1990. According to the United Nations' Fowler Report, Joe De Deker, a former stockholder in De Beers, worked with the government of Zaire to supply military equipment to UNITA from 1993 to 1997. De Deker's brother, Ronnie, allegedly flew from South Africa to Angola, directing weapons originating in Eastern Europe. In return, UNITA gave Ronnie bushels of diamonds worth US$6 million. De Deker sent the diamonds to De Beer's buying office in Antwerp, Belgium. De Beers openly acknowledges spending $500 million on legal and illegal Angolan diamonds in 1992 alone. The United Nations estimates Angolans made between three and four billion dollars through the diamond trade between 1992 and 1998. The UN also estimates that out of that sum, UNITA made at least $3.72 billion, or 93% of all diamond sales, despite international sanctions.

Executive Outcomes (EO), a private military company which had fought on behalf of UNITA prior to the 1992 elections, switched sides after the election. EO played a major role in turning the tide for the MPLA with one U.S. defense expert calling the EO the "best fifty or sixty million dollars the Angolan government ever spent". Heritage Oil and Gas, and allegedly De Beers, hired EO to protect their operations in Angola. Executive Outcomes trained 4,000 to 5,000 troops and 30 pilots in combat in camps in Lunda Sul, Cabo Ledo, and Dondo.

== Cabinda separatism ==
Cabindan rebels kidnapped and ransomed off foreign oil workers throughout the 1990s to in turn finance further attacks against the national government. FLEC militants stopped buses, forcing Chevron Oil workers out, and setting fire to the buses on March 27 and April 23, 1992. A large scale battle took place between FLEC and police in Malongo on May 14 in which 25 mortar rounds accidentally hit a nearby Chevron compound. The government, fearing the loss of their prime source of revenue, began to negotiate with representatives from Front for the Liberation of the Enclave of Cabinda-Renewal (FLEC-R), Armed Forces of Cabinda (FLEC-FAC), and the Democratic Front of Cabinda (FDC) in 1995. Patronage and bribery failed to assuage the anger of FLEC-R and FLEC-FAC and negotiations ended. In February 1997, FLEC-FAC kidnapped two Inwangsa SDN-timber company employees, killing one and releasing the other after receiving a US$400,000 ransom. FLEC-FLAC kidnapped 11 people in April 1998, nine Angolans and two Portuguese, released for a US$500,000 ransom. FLEC-R kidnapped five Byansol oil engineering employees, two Frenchman, two Portuguese, and an Angolan, in March 1999. While militants released the Angolan, the government complicated the situation by promising the rebel leadership $12.5 million for the hostages. When António Bento Bembe, the President of FLEC-R, showed up, the Angolan army arrested him and his bodyguards. The Angolan army later forcibly freed the other hostages on July 7. By the end of the year the government had arrested the leadership of all three rebel organizations.

== See also ==
- Angolagate
- First Congo War
- United Nations Angola Verification Mission II
- Angola: Promises and Lies
