= My Heart of Darkness =

- Directed by: Staffan Julén; Marius van Niekerk
- Produced by: Staffan Julén; Christian Beetz; Johan Liljeström
- Starring: Samuel Machado Amaru; Patrick Johannes; Mario Mahonga; Marius van Niekerk
- Cinematography: Peter Östlund
- Music by: Janne Anderson
- Production companies: Eden Film (Gebrueder Beetz Filmproduktion, Sveriges Television, Akwafrica, ZDF/Arte)
- Distributed by: Films Transit International; Folkets bio
- Release date: 2010
- Running time: 93 minutes
- Countries: Sweden; Germany
- Languages: English; Portuguese; Afrikaans

My Heart of Darkness is a Swedish–German 2010 documentary film about four ex-soldiers from different sides of the Angolan civil war and their posttraumatic stress disorder. The film was recorded in 2007. It was first shown at the International Documentary Film Festival Amsterdam on November 20, 2010. It premiered in Sweden on April 8 the next year. The title of the film is a reference to Joseph Conrad's novella Heart of Darkness. The film, like the novella, takes place on a boat traveling up an African river, and covers issues of tragedy and abuse.

The four ex-soldiers do not all speak the same language, but translate for each other. The narrator Marius van Niekerk, who is also the film's director and lead character, speaks English, while the others speak Portuguese and Afrikaans.

== Story ==
In 1979, during the height of apartheid, 17-year old Afrikaner Marius van Niekerk joined the South African Defence Force (SADF), serving with some distinction during the South African Border War. By 1985, he had emigrated to Sweden, but remained haunted by post-traumatic stress disorder. The documentary's narrative follows van Niekerk as he returns to Angola for the first time since the end of the war to make peace with his past, accompanied by three other veterans of various conflicts in that country: Samuel Machado Amaru, Patrick Johannes, and Mario Mahonga. During their sojourn, van Niekerk describes the war crimes he witnessed in the SADF, as well as symptoms of his post-traumatic stress. He invites the other three veterans to describe their military service as well. The film ends with the four participating in a purification ritual, in which they destroy various symbolic mementos from their past.
