= Andrew Eiva =

American soldier, political lobbyist, and activist

- Born: Andrius Linas Eitavicius; 26 October 1948 (age 77); Bonn, West Germany
- Education: West Point (BS)
- Occupations: soldier, political lobbyist and human rights activist
- Awards: Order of the Cross of Vytis

Andrew Eiva is an American soldier, political lobbyist and human rights activist.

He is best known for his role in lobbying Congress and grassroots organisations to expose and upgrade the US covert operation in Afghanistan which, in his opinion provided Afghans "only enough to fight and die," which he believed had squandered over 500,000 Afghan lives by 1984.

Eiva also contributed to the defence of the Lithuanian Parliament during the January Events of 1991. During the collapse of the USSR, he came to Lithuania to train supporters of independence in guerrilla warfare.

== Career ==
Eiva specialized in guerrilla warfare support and, as a refugee from the Soviet occupation in Lithuania, dedicated himself to overthrowing the Soviet empire. After graduating from West Point in 1972, Eiva served in the US Army in Fort Bragg, North Carolina, first with the 82nd Airborne Division, then with Special Forces where he pioneered early UAV delivery systems.

As a lobbyist, Eiva works to organize committees of ordinary Americans to influence the Congress.

== Arming the Afghan Mujahideen against the Soviets ==
Due to his testimony to the Republican Platform Committee's National Security Subcommittee on 13 August 1984 at the Republican Convention in Dallas, Texas Eiva was responsible for having language inserted into the party platform calling for support of the Afghan Mujahideen in their fight against the Soviets.

From 1983 to 1988, Eiva published the Afghan Update, a newsletter which provided analysis and criticism of CIA and State Department policy. He was executive director of two sister organizations, the Federation for American Afghan Action and the American Afghan Education Fund. With the support of the right-wing, Mormon lobbying group Free the Eagle, Eiva was able to influence opinion in Congress in favour of the Afghan resistance.

Lobbying to pass legislation for effective aid, Eiva encountered opposition from political opponents as well as US government agencies. Nonetheless, the bill passed unanimously as Senate Concurrent Resolution 74 on 3 October 1984, and the House of Representatives on 4 October 1984.

In 2005, as the executive director of the Federation for American Afghan Action, Eiva reported that this organization had 'found up to 70% slippage' in supplies to Mujahideen forces.

== Support for anti-communist movements ==
Leslie Gelb of the New York Times says that Eiva, in 1983, counted the score of American support for liberation movements since World War II as "0 to 12, with Afghanistan as lucky 13". The other such ventures supported and then dropped by Washington he lists as Lithuania, Albania, Ukraine, Poland, Tibet, China, Cuba, Kurdistan twice, Angola, the Hmong tribe in Laos and Sumatra. Eiva continues to support freedom and resistance movements around the world, including those in Sudan and Balochistan. He advocates that the people of Balochistan themselves author their own Freedom Charter, rather than accept one written by foreigners.

In February 2014, Eiva launched a new website, Liberation Pulse, supporting freedom and resistance movements.

== Personal life ==
Andrew Eiva's parents escaped communist Lithuania in 1944, met and married in 1947 in Bonn, West Germany, where Andrew was born in a refugee camp in 1948. He was reared on stories about Lithuanian resistance, American support for a while and, finally, abandonment.

His maternal grandfather, General Kazys Ladiga, drove the Soviet forces out of Lithuania after World War I, and was chief of staff of the armed forces of independent Lithuania from 1925 to 1927. In 1940, when the Soviets seized Lithuania, General Ladiga was deported to Siberia, where he was tortured and executed.

Andrew's maternal grandmother, Stefanija Ladigienė sheltered and saved a thirteen year old Jewish girl, Irena Veisaitė. In recognition of Stefanija's rescue of Irena, the Yad Vashem Institute in Jerusalem, engraved her name on its wall as Righteous Among the Nations.

== Awards ==
Andrew Eiva was presented with the Order of the Cross of Vytis in Vilnius, Lithuania on 16 February 2012 for his services to the cause of restoration of the Independent State of Lithuania. Eiva was involved in defending the Lithuanian Parliament during the January Events of 1991.

Eiva was also honored on 16 December 2011 at the Lithuanian Embassy in Washington, D.C. for his service to the cause of Lithuanian independence.
