= This House Has Fallen =

2001 book by Karl Maier

This House has Fallen
- Author: Karl Maier
- Subject: History of Nigeria; Politics in Nigeria government
- Genre: History
- Publication date: 2000
- Media type: print (paperback), Ebook
- Pages: 326
- ISBN: 9780140298840
- OCLC: 51497111
- Preceded by: Angola: Promises and Lies (1996)

This House Has Fallen: Nigeria In Crisis is a book written by American author, Karl Maier. It was published in 2000 by Penguin Books. The book was centered on the History of Nigeria and the problem of politics in Nigeria.

== Reception ==
Nicolas Okpe said, “the book is typical post-colonial prejudice by western journalist”. Editors Ali B. and Ali-Dinar in African Studies Center of University of Pennsylvania wrote, "...This book is by no means a comprehensive account of Nigerian history. That would involve decades and many volumes. Rather, its purpose is to portray the most intractable crisis points and the ethnic and regional tensions threatening the survival of what is perhaps the largest failed state in the Third World." Aishatu Morido Yanet writing for the International Journal of Peace and Conflict Studies also reviewed the book and called it "rich and useful to scholars". A review by Publishers Weekly added, "Maier puts a human face on a disheartening situation that seems remote and impersonal to most Americans."

== Bibliography ==
- Maier, Karl (2002). This House Has Fallen: Nigeria in Crisis. Penguin. ISBN 9780140298840.
