= Democratic Front of Cabinda =

Democratic Front of Cabinda (Portuguese: Frente Democrática de Cabinda; abbreviated to FDC) is a separatist rebel group that fights for the independence of Cabinda province from Angola.

Cabindan rebels kidnapped and ransomed off foreign oil workers throughout the 1990s to in turn finance further attacks against the national government. Front for the Liberation of the Enclave of Cabinda (FLEC) militants stopped buses, forcing Chevron Oil workers out, and setting fire to the buses on March 27 and April 23, 1992. A large scale battle took place between FLEC and police in Malongo on May 14 in which 25 mortar rounds accidentally hit a nearby Chevron compound. The government, fearing the loss of their prime source of revenue, began to negotiate with representatives from Front for the Liberation of the Enclave of Cabinda-Renewal (FLEC-R), Armed Forces of Cabinda (FLEC-FAC), and the Democratic Front of Cabinda (FDC) in 1995. Patronage and bribery failed to assuage the anger of FLEC-R and FLEC-FAC and negotiations ended. In February 1997, FLEC-FAC kidnapped two Inwangsa SDN-timber company employees, killing one and releasing the other after receiving a US$400,000 ransom. FLEC-FLAC kidnapped 11 people in April 1998, nine Angolans and two Portuguese, released for a US$500,000 ransom. FLEC-R kidnapped five Byansol oil engineering employees, two Frenchman, two Portuguese, and an Angolan, in March 1999. While militants released the Angolan, the government complicated the situation by promising the rebel leadership $12.5 million for the hostages. When António Bento Bembe, the President of FLEC-R, showed up, the Angolan army arrested him and his bodyguards. The Angolan army later forcibly freed the other hostages on July 7. By the end of the year, the government had arrested the leadership of all three rebel organizations.

In addition to FDC's war against the Angolan government, the government was also opposed by a United States-supported rebel movement, UNITA, led by Jonas Savimbi, which was involved in military conflict in the Angolan Civil War from 1975 until Savimbi was killed in combat by government troops in 2002.
