= Karl Maier (journalist) =

American journalist and author (born 1957)

- Born: November 15, 1957 (age 68); Louisville, Kentucky
- Education: University of Kentucky
- Occupations: Journalist, writer
- Writing career
- Pen name: Karl Maier
- Period: 1990–present
- Genres: History, Politics
- Notable works: This House Has Fallen (2000); Angola: Promises and Lies (1996)

Karl Maier (born November 1957) is an American journalist and author best known for his work, This House Has Fallen (2000) and his two-decade career at Bloomberg News. Karl worked as a correspondent in Africa serving The Independent, a British newspaper. His articles have also appeared in The Economist, The Christian Science Monitor, Africa Confidential and The Washington Post Until December 2024, he worked at Bloomberg News, where he was a Middle East editor during the Arab Spring, the Africa politics team leader, and most recently an editor of the Balance of Power newsletter.

He is the author of Angola: Promises and Lies, Into the House of the Ancestors and This House Has Fallen

== Biography ==
Maier was born in Louisville, Kentucky in 1957. In 1986, he became a correspondent for Africa serving The Independent. His research as a journalist had him travel and explore the African continent until 1996. He travelled to Zimbabwe, Mozambique, Nigeria, Angola, South Africa, Botswana, Zambia, Kenya, Somalia, Mali, Liberia and Burkina Faso. He wrote several books including one on Nigeria This House Has Fallen and Angola: Promises and Lies.

== Literary career and style ==
=== Angola: Promises and Lies ===
His works were written during conflicts including the Angola civil war and the Mozambique civil war. Karl wrote his novel, Angola: Promises and Lies, during the civil war. A review by Publishers Weekly called it an "..engrossing chronological account of the war, and noted that in a [compelling narrative]." Thornycroft also called it "A luminously accurate [gem of war]."

=== Into the House of the Ancestors: Inside the New Africa ===
Karl wrote his third book. Sarah Penny, she praised the book saying,"...The Author takes a more hopeful look at Africa as a whole. His [optimism for Africa] greatly constitutes the philosophical theme and heart of the book." Writing for The New York Times Book Review, Howard W. French said, "Maier's work in into the House of Ancestors seeks neither to sanitize the image of Sub Saharan Africa nor to soft-pedal its problems." In a review by Foreign Affairs, Gail M. Gerhart wrote, "...show that there is plenty of virtue among ordinary Africans, particularly when they draw on the strength of traditional values."

Maier's work confirms that people in Africa face considerable obstacles, including civil wars, famine, disease, and political disorder. However, Maier gives us hope that they can rebound and even thrive.

Ruth K. Baacke wrote in a review for Library Journal.

=== This House Has Fallen ===
Bloomberg Businessweek praised Maier's work writing, "...the absorbing, heartbreaking story of Nigeria from its creation in 1960 through forty years of failure and disappointment to a time of renewal—apparent renewal, we had better say." Chris King writing for The New York Times Book Review said Karl had always explored theme of Nigeria literature and history. He also said his works were based on [Nigerians from the upper classes]. Richard Dowden writing in Economist wrote, "Maier's observation is meticulous, and his heart sympathetic. By skillfully blending anecdote, travel, and history, his book throbs with the Nigerians' huge humanity and their hopes, anger and joy. This House Has Fallen is an [eminently readable] offering for anyone who wants to get behind the tragic headlines and understand the vital heart of West Africa."

== Selected works ==
- Angola: Promises and Lies (1996)
- Into the House of the Ancestors (1998)
- This House Has Fallen: Nigeria In Crisis (2000)
- Conspicuous Destruction: War, Famine, and the Reform Process in Mozambique (With Kemal Mustafa and Alex Vines); Africa Watch, New York (1992)
