= Angola: Promises and Lies =

1996 book by Karl Maier

- Author: Karl Maier
- Language: English
- Genre: Journalism
- Publisher: Serif
- Publication date: 1996
- ISBN: 9781909150232
- Followed by: This House Has Fallen (2000)

Angola: Promises and Lies is a 1996 book by journalist Karl Maier covering the third phase of the Angolan Civil War between 1992 and 1994, published by Serif.

== Overview ==
The book is a diary of Maier's travels across the country (including to Cuíto and Malanje) during the fighting that broke out after UNITA leader Jonas Savimbi's rejection of the 1992 Angolan general election results. It narrates his encounters with both civilians and soldiers, and emphasises the refusal among the highland population to seek refuge from the war in the coastal areas. It also recounts as background the previous, Cold War stage of the conflict, during which Maier witnessed the 1987–1988 Battle of Cuito Cuanavale. The book's depiction of the two warring sides of MPLA and UNITA is said to be "even-handed" and inviting comparison.

== Reviews ==
Historian David Birmingham wrote in a review for African Affairs: "Maier's poetic celebration of the lives of real people, written with an elegant economy of style, and his perception of the demons who manipulate power, provide a compelling insight into the tragedy of Angola. His book is the ideal companion to that of Margaret Anstee, the woman who was appointed to deal with the 'demons' and bring peace to Angola's people". He elsewhere praised the book for its "dispassionate" explanation of the then-recent phase of the Angolan Civil War, while stating that Maier "brooks no deviation from the truth as he perceives it".

Publishers Weekly called the book "an [engrossing chronological account] of the war". The Times Literary Supplement described Maier as "[o]ne who shows highly memorable vignettes how ordinary people have been affected by a war". Booklist also reviewed the title.
