= Alberto Joaquim Vinama =

- Died: October 10, 1986
- Commands: People's Armed Forces of Liberation of Angola

Brigadier Alberto Joaquim Vinama (died October 10, 1986), also known as Chendovava, served as the Chief of staff of the People's Armed Forces for the Liberation of Angola, the armed wing of UNITA, from January 1985 until his death in October 1986. He replaced Demosthenes Amos Chilingutila, demoted to Chief of Operations, who regained his office upon Vinama's death.
