= Demosthenes Amos Chilingutila =

Angolan rebel

Brigadier Demosthenes Amos Chilingutila served as the Chief of staff of the Armed Forces for the Liberation of Angola (FALA), the armed wing of UNITA, from 1979 to January 1985 and again after October 1986.

Jonas Savimbi, the leader of UNITA, demoted Chilingutila for UNITA's military failures in the 1970s to Chief of Operations in 1985. Alberto Joaquim Vinama succeeded Chilingutila until his death in a car accident in October 1986. Chilingutila then regained his office.
