= Free the Eagle =

Free the Eagle is an American neoconservative lobbying group based in Washington, D.C. Neal Blair is the firm's President. Andrew Eiva joined the organization in 1984 as a paid Afghan lobbyist. Blair believed that Eiva could rally conservatives who felt that the US Central Intelligence Agency, as well as the Council on Foreign Relations and the Trilateral Commission, were dominated by people of suspect patriotism.

== See also ==
- Angolan Civil War
- FIM-92 Stinger
- Lobbying in the United States
- Soviet Afghan war
