= Operation Restore =

- Part of the Angolan Civil War
- Operation Restore (Angola)
Date	September 1999 – December 1999
Location	Bié and Huambo Provinces, Angola
Status	Jonas Savimbi flees to Lucusse in Moxico Province

Belligerents
Angola	UNITA

Commanders and leaders
(Angola) Gen. João de Matos	Jonas Savimbi

Units involved
Angola: Angolan Army; National Air Force of Angola; b.a.o.c. ( Benguela/17 de Setembro (FNBG) Base Aérea No.5 (Catumbela)	UNITA: Unknown

Strength
(Angola) 15.000–25.000	20.000

Casualties and losses
6.000 BMP-1 (1 destruído)	4.000-3.000

Operation Restore (Portuguese: Operaçao Restaurar) was a military operation that the Angolan Armed Forces (FAA) conducted against the National Union for the Total Independence of Angola (UNITA) and its militant wing, the Armed Forces for the Liberation of Angola (FALA). FAA carried out Operation Restore in late 1999 during the Angolan Civil War.

The FAA captured Andulo and Bailundo. By December, Chief of Staff General João de Matos said the FAA had destroyed 80% of FALA's manpower and captured 15,000 tons of military equipment.
