= Eugenio Manuvakola =

Angolan politician

Eugenio Manuvakola was the leader of UNITA-Renovada, a breakaway faction of the UNITA political party in Angola. Manuvakola resigned from UNITA-Renovada's leadership in July 2002.
