= United Nations Security Council Resolution 1448 =

United Nations Security Council resolution

UN Security Council Resolution 1448
- Angola
- Date: 9 December 2002
- Meeting no.: 4,657
- Code: S/RES/1448 (Document)
- Subject: The situation in Angola
- Voting summary: 15 voted for; None voted against; None abstained
- Result: Adopted

Security Council composition
- Permanent members: China; France; Russia; United Kingdom; United States
- Non-permanent members: Bulgaria; Cameroon; Colombia; Guinea; Ireland; Mauritius; Mexico; Norway; Singapore; Syria

United Nations Security Council resolution 1448, adopted unanimously on 9 December 2002, after reaffirming Resolution 864 (1993) and all subsequent resolutions on Angola, particularly resolutions 1127 (1997), 1173 (1998), 1237 (1999), 1295 (2000), 1336 (2001), 1348 (2001), 1374 (2001), 1404 (2002), 1412 (2002), 1432 (2002), 1434 (2002) and 1439 (2002), the Council noted progress in the country and lifted remaining sanctions against UNITA, including an arms embargo, travel restrictions and the freezing of assets.

The Security Council expressed concern at the effects of the civil war on the humanitarian situation, and welcomed steps taken by the Angolan government to implement the Lusaka Protocol and other agreements. It also reaffirmed its commitment to preserve the sovereignty and territorial integrity of Angola.

Acting under Chapter VII of the United Nations Charter, the Council terminated all measures against UNITA with effect from the adoption of the current resolution. They were first imposed in 1993 in an attempt to end the civil war. The Committee of the Security Council, established in Resolution 864, would also be dissolved. Finally, the Secretary-General Kofi Annan was instructed to close the voluntary trust fund for Angola that supported investigations into violations of the sanctions while they were in effect.

== See also ==
- Angolan Civil War
- List of United Nations Security Council Resolutions 1401 to 1500 (2002–2003)
