= 2000s in Angola =

The 2000s in Angola saw the end of a 27-year-long civil war (1975–2002) and economic growth as foreign nations began to invest in Angola's untapped petroleum reserves. The government continues to resettle internally displaced persons as its economy recovers and expands.

== 2000 ==
Illicit arms trading characterized much of the last years of the Angolan war. Each side tried to gain the upper hand by buying arms in Eastern Europe and Russia. With the help of a shipping agent in London, a Russian freighter delivered 500 tons of Ukrainian 7.62mm ammunition to Simportex (a state-owned company responsible for defence-related imports and exports) on 21 September 2000. The ship's captain had declared his cargo "fragile" to minimize inspection. The next day, the MPLA began attacking UNITA, winning victories in several battles during between then and 25 September. The government gained control over military bases and diamond mines in Lunda Norte Province and Lunda Sul Province, hurting UNITA’s ability to pay its troops.

== 2001 ==
Angola agreed to trade oil to Slovakia in return for arms, buying six Sukhoi Su-17 attack aircraft on 3 April 2000. The Spanish government in the Canary Islands prevented a Ukrainian freighter from delivering 636 tons of military equipment to Angola on 24 February 2001. The captain of the ship had inaccurately reported his cargo, falsely claiming the ship carried automobile parts. The Angolan government admitted Simportex had purchased arms from Rosvooruzhenie, the Russian state-owned arms company, and acknowledged the captain might have violated Spanish law by misreporting his cargo, a common practice in arms smuggling to Angola.

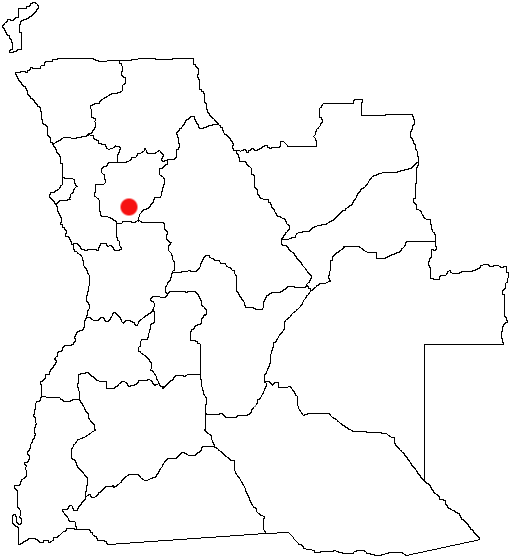
More than 700 villagers trekked 60 km from Golungo Alto to Ndalatando (red dot), fleeing a UNITA attack. They remained uninjured.

UNITA carried out several attacks against civilians in May in a show of strength. UNITA militants attacked Caxito on 7 May, killing 100 people and kidnapping 60 children and two adults. UNITA then attacked Baia-do-Cuio, followed by an attack on Golungo Alto, a city 200 km east of Luanda, a few days later. The militants advanced on Golungo Alto at 2:00 pm on 21 May, staying until 9:00 pm on 22 May when the Angolan military retook the town. They looted local businesses, taking food and alcoholic beverages before singing drunkenly in the streets. More than 700 villagers trekked 60 km from Golungo Alto to Ndalatando, the provincial capital of Cuanza Norte, without injury. According to an aid official in Ndalatando, the Angolan military prohibited media coverage of the incident, so the details of the attack are unknown. Joffre Justino, UNITA's spokesman in Portugal, said UNITA only attacked Gungo Alto to demonstrate the government's military inferiority and the need to cut a deal. Four days later UNITA released the children to a Catholic mission in Camabatela, a city 200 km (120 mi) from where UNITA kidnapped them. The national organization said the abduction violated their policy towards the treatment of civilians. In a letter to the bishops of Angola, Jonas Savimbi asked the Catholic church to act as an intermediary between UNITA and the government in negotiations. The attacks took their toll on Angola's economy. At the end of May, De Beers, the international diamond mining company, suspended its operations in Angola, ostensibly on the grounds that negotiations with the national government reached an impasse.

Militants of unknown affiliation fired rockets at United Nations World Food Program (UNWFP) planes on 8 June near Luena and again near Kuito a few days later. As the first plane, a Boeing 727, approached Luena someone shot a missile at the aircraft, damaging one engine but not critically as the three-man crew landed successfully. The plane's altitude, 5,000 metres, most likely prevented the assailant from identifying his target. As the citizens of Luena had enough food to last them several weeks, the UNFWP temporarily suspended their flights. When the flights began again a few days later, militants shot at a plane flying to Kuito, the first attack targeting UN workers since 1999. The UNWFP again suspended food aid flights throughout the country. While he did not claim responsibility for the attack, UNITA spokesman Justino said the planes carried weapons and soldiers rather than food, making them acceptable targets. UNITA and the Angolan government both said the international community needed to pressure the other side into returning to the negotiating table. Despite the looming humanitarian crisis, neither side guaranteed UNWFP planes safety. Kuito, which had relied on international aid, only had enough food to feed their population of 200,000. The UNFWP had to fly in all aid to Kuito and the rest of the Central Highlands because militants ambushed trucks. Further complicating the situation, potholes in the Kuito airport strip slowed aid deliveries. Overall chaos reduced the amount of available oil to the point at which the UN had to import its jet fuel.

Government troops captured and destroyed UNITA's Epongoloko base in Benguela province and Mufumbo base in Cuanza Sul in October 2001. The Slovak government sold fighter jets to the Angolan government in 2001 in violation of the European Union Code of Conduct on Arms Exports.

== 2002 to 2005 ==
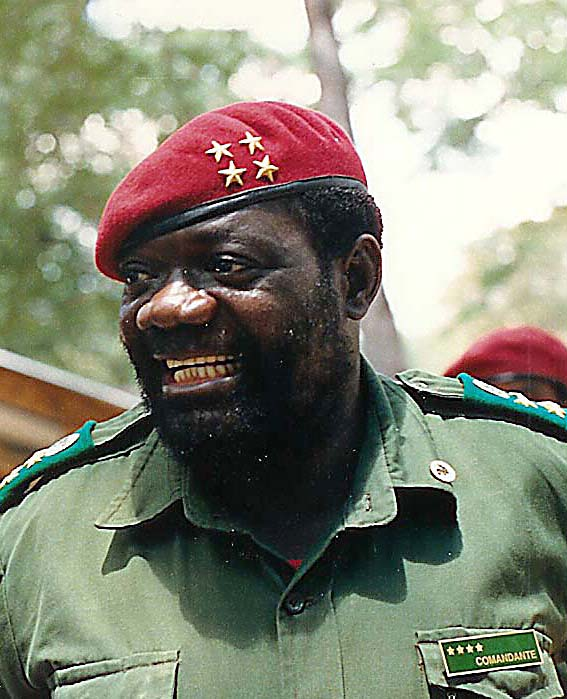
UNITA leader Jonas Savimbi was killed in action in 2002.

Government troops killed Savimbi on 22 February 2002, in Moxico province. UNITA Vice President António Dembo took over, but died from diabetes twelve days later on 3 March, and Secretary-General Paulo Lukamba Gato became UNITA's leader. After Savimbi's death, the government came to a crossroads over how to proceed. After initially indicating the counter-insurgency might continue, the government announced it would halt all military operations on 13 March. Military commanders for UNITA and the MPLA met in Cassamba and agreed to a cease-fire. However, Carlos Morgado, UNITA's spokesman in Portugal, said that the UNITA's Portugal wing had been under the impression General Kamorteiro, the UNITA general who agreed to the ceasefire, had been captured more than a week earlier. Morgado did say that he had not heard from Angola since Savimbi's death. The military commanders signed a Memorandum of Understanding as an addendum to the Lusaka Protocol in Luena on 4 April, Dos Santos and Lukambo observing.

The United Nations Security Council passed Resolution 1404 on 18 April, extending the monitoring mechanism of sanctions by six months. Resolutions 1412 and 1432, passed on 17 May and 15 August respectively, suspended the UN travel ban on UNITA officials for 90 days each, finally abolishing the ban through Resolution 1439 on 18 October. UNAVEM III, extended an additional two months by Resolution 1439, ended on 19 December.

UNITA's new leadership declared the rebel group a political party and officially demobilized its armed forces in August 2002. That same month, the United Nations Security Council replaced the United Nations Office in Angola with the United Nations Mission in Angola, a larger, non-military, political presence.

The civil war spawned a disastrous humanitarian crisis in Angola, internally displacing 4.28 million people, one-third of Angola's population. The United Nations estimated in 2003 that 80% of Angolans lacked access to basic medical care, 60% lacked access to water, and 30% of Angolan children would die before the age of five, with an overall life expectancy of less than forty years of age. The government spent $187 million settling IDPs (Internally Displaced Persons) between 4 April 2002 and 2004, after which the World Bank gave $33 million to continue the settling process. The UN Office for the Coordination of Humanitarian Affairs (OCHA) estimated that fighting in 2002 displaced 98,000 people between 1 January and 28 February alone. The IDPs, unacquainted with their surroundings, frequently and predominantly fell victim to these weapons. IDPs comprised 75% of all landmine victims. Militant forces laid approximately 15 million landmines by 2002. The HALO Trust charity began demining in 1994, destroying 30,000 by July 2007. There are 1,100 Angolans and seven foreign workers who are working for HALO Trust in Angola, with operations expected to finish sometime between 2011 and 2014.

Human Rights Watch estimates UNITA and the government employed more than 6,000 and 3,000 child soldiers respectively, some forcibly impressed, during the war. Human rights analysts found 5,000 to 8,000 underage girls married to UNITA militants. Some girls were ordered to go and forage for food to provide for the troops. If the girls did not bring back enough food as judged by their commander, then the girls would not eat. After victories, UNITA commanders would be rewarded with women who were often then sexually abused. The government and U.N. agencies identified 190 child soldiers in the Angolan army and relocated seventy of them by November 2002, but the government continued to knowingly employ other underage soldiers.

The Angolan government pledged to abide by the provisions of the Extractive Industries Transparency Initiative (EITI) in June 2003.

Inflation decreased from 410% in 2000 to 110% in 2001 and 18.5% in 2005 as foreign investment began to bear fruit. The proportion of deposits lent as credit increased from 30% to 70% from 2002 to 2005. Banco BPI, a Portuguese bank, makes over 25% of its net profits in Angola, Other banks based in Portugal and South Africa plan to open offices in Angola.

== 2006 ==
Government representatives and Bembo Bembe, a former leader of FLEC, signed a Memorandum of Understanding on 1 August 2006, in an attempt to end the 29-year-long Cabindan war. Bembe signed ostensibly on behalf of the Cabinda Forum for Dialogue (FCD). Many FCD members considered Bembe's signing illegitimate and rejected the agreement, which only granted Cabinda autonomy, not independence. The MoU included an amnesty for all crimes committed during the independence war (1977–2006).

The government shut down Mpalabanda, a Cabindan human rights organization and a member of the FCD, by court order in June 2006. The government said Mpalabanda had engaged in illegal political activities. The NGO appealed the court's decision. Mpalabanda accused both the military and FLEC militants of committing human rights abuses in Cabinda. Border officials arrested Raul Danda, Mpalabanda's spokesman, at Cabinda airport on the charge of 'instigating crimes against the security of the state', owning pro-independence literature, on 29 September.

== 2007 ==
Alan Kleier, the General Director for Chevron Corporation's operations in Angola, met with Marco Nhunga, Deputy General of the IDA (Instituto de Desenvolvimento Agrário), Cynthia G. Efird, the United States Ambassador to Angola, and Estevão Rodrigues, Director of CLUSA in Angola, in Benguela province on 1 March 2007.

Inclement weather caused a helicopter owned by BHP Billiton, the world's largest mining company, to crash in Angola on 16 November 2007, killing the helicopter's five passengers, including BHP's chief operation officer in Angola, David Hopgood. The helicopter went down about 50 miles from Alto Cuilo Camp, a diamond mining site the employees wanted to visit. BHP Billiton responded by suspending operations in the country. The company is investigating the incident.

== 2008 ==
The price of crude oil declined from $147.27 per barrel on 11 July 2008 to a 70% price drop in December. Many OPEC members advocated cutting the supply of oil by 1.5 to 2 million barrels to artificially inflate the price of petroleum to roughly $75 per barrel. Richard Segal, an analyst for the United Bank of Africa, posited that the 2008 financial crisis made borrowing from the Chinese government cheaper than taking loans from the West. President dos Santos visited China shortly after the crisis erupted, meeting with President Hu Jintao, Prime Minister Wen Jiabao, and Wu Bangguo, the President of the Standing Committee of the National People's Congress. He asked his Chinese counterparts for $1 billion in investment in Angola's infrastructure, specifically in housing and water transportation. The Chinese government has invested $5–7 billion in Angola in return for Angola's crude oil. Nonetheless, Ricardo Gazel, a senior economist for the World Bank, predicted that Angola's initial budget for 2009, based on oil exports at $55 per barrel, would be revised with a much more modest outlook by as early as April 2009.

Despite the decline in the price of oil, Angola usurped Nigeria's place as the top producer of petroleum in sub-Saharan Africa in early 2008. Angola's oil exports were the primary contributor to the country's 25% growth rate, attracting illegal immigrants from West Africa. Angola LNG Limited awarded a $250 million contract to Acergy S.A., an oil and gas construction company, on 15 December to build an offshore pipeline, connecting five oil blocks with Angola LNG's plant in Soyo.

Petra Diamonds company ended its operations in Alto Cuilo amid a general downturn in demand for diamonds on 19 December. The company also announced that it is considering leaving Luangue, losing $62.3 million the company had previously invested.

The government held legislative elections on 5 September 2008, the first national election in sixteen years. Election observers reported serious electoral irregularities and restrictions on political freedom.

== See also ==
- Angolan Civil War (2000–2002)
- Angolagate
