= History of Angola =

Angola was first settled by San hunter-gatherer societies before the northern domains came under the rule of Bantu states such as Kongo and Ndongo. In the 15th century, Portuguese colonists began trading, and a settlement was established at Luanda during the 16th century. Portugal annexed territories in the region which were ruled as a colony from 1655, and Angola was incorporated as an overseas province of Portugal in 1951. After the Angolan War of Independence, which ended in 1974 with an army mutiny and leftist coup in Lisbon, Angola achieved independence in 1975 through the Alvor Agreement. After independence, Angola entered a long period of civil war that lasted until 2002.

== Prehistory ==
The area of present-day Angola was inhabited during the Paleolithic and Neolithic eras, as attested by remains found in Luanda, Congo, and the Namibe desert. At the beginning of recorded history other cultures and people also arrived.

The first ones to settle were the San people. This changed at the beginning of the sixth century AD, when the Bantu, already in possession of metal-working technology, ceramics and agriculture began migrating from the north. When they reached what is now Angola they encountered the San and other groups. The establishment of the Bantu took many centuries and gave rise to a variety of groupings that took on different ethnic characteristics.

== Kingdom of Kongo ==
The first large political entity in the area, known to history as the Kingdom of Kongo, appeared in the thirteenth century and stretched from Gabon in the north to the river Kwanza in the south, and from the Atlantic in the west to the river Cuango in the east.

The wealth of the Kongo came mainly from agriculture. Power was in the hands of the Mani, aristocrats who occupied key positions in the kingdom and who answered only to the all-powerful King of the Kongo. Mbanza was the name given to a territorial unit administered and ruled by a Mani; Mbanza Congo, the capital, had a population of over fifty thousand in the sixteenth century.

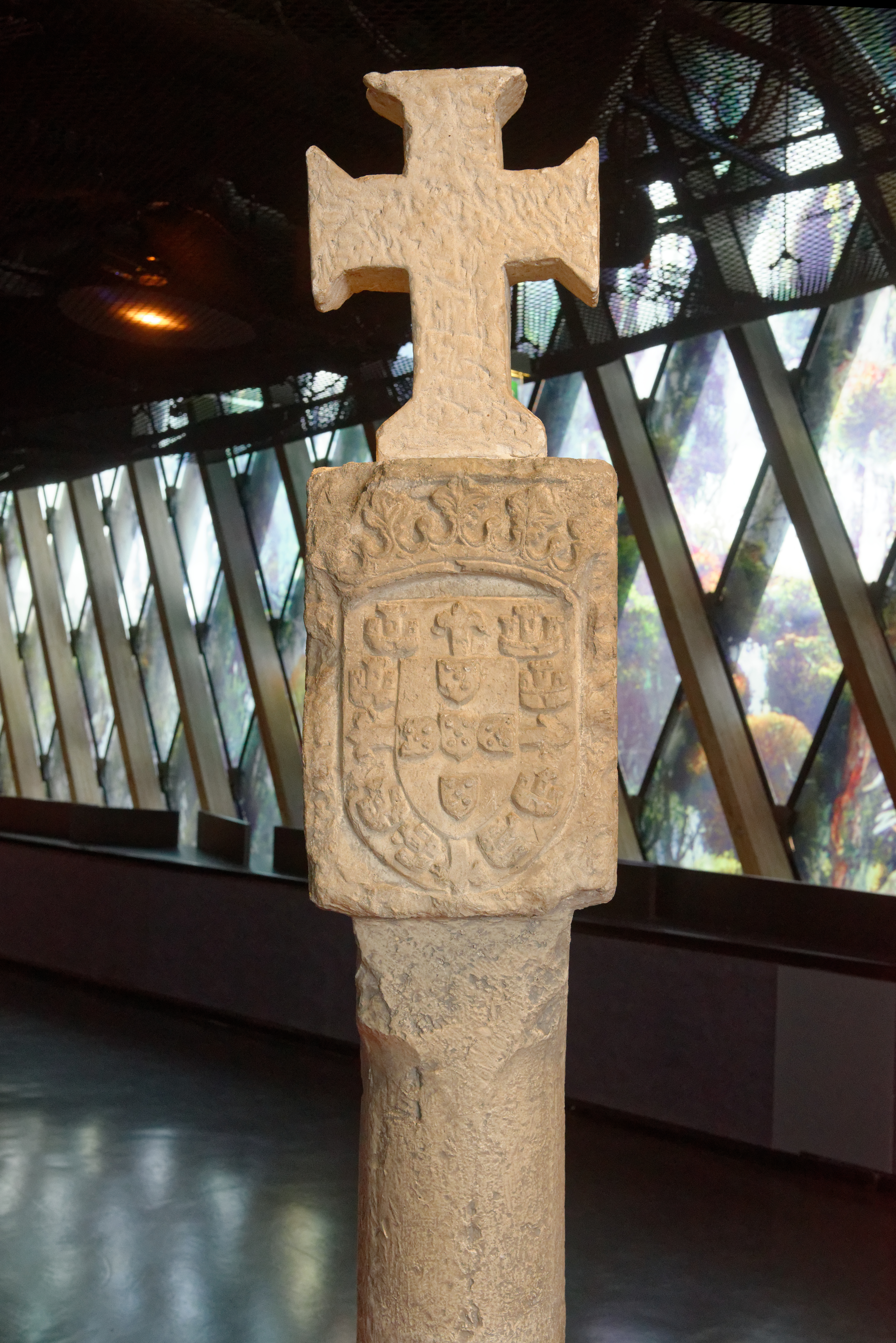
A copy of the padrão erected by Diogo Cão's ships at Cabo de Santa Maria in 1482

The Kingdom of Kongo was divided into six provinces and included some dependent kingdoms, such as Ndongo to the south. Trade was the main activity, based on highly productive agriculture and increasing exploitation of mineral wealth. In 1482, Portuguese caravels commanded by Diogo Cão arrived in the Congo and he explored the extreme north-western coast of what today is Angola in 1484. Other expeditions followed, and close relations were soon established between the two states. The Portuguese brought firearms and many other technological advances, as well as a new religion (Christianity); in return, the King of the Congo offered plenty of slaves, ivory, and minerals.

The King of the Kongo soon converted to Christianity and adopted a similar political structure to the Europeans. He became a well-known figure in Europe, to the point of receiving missives from the Pope.

== Kingdom of Ndongo ==
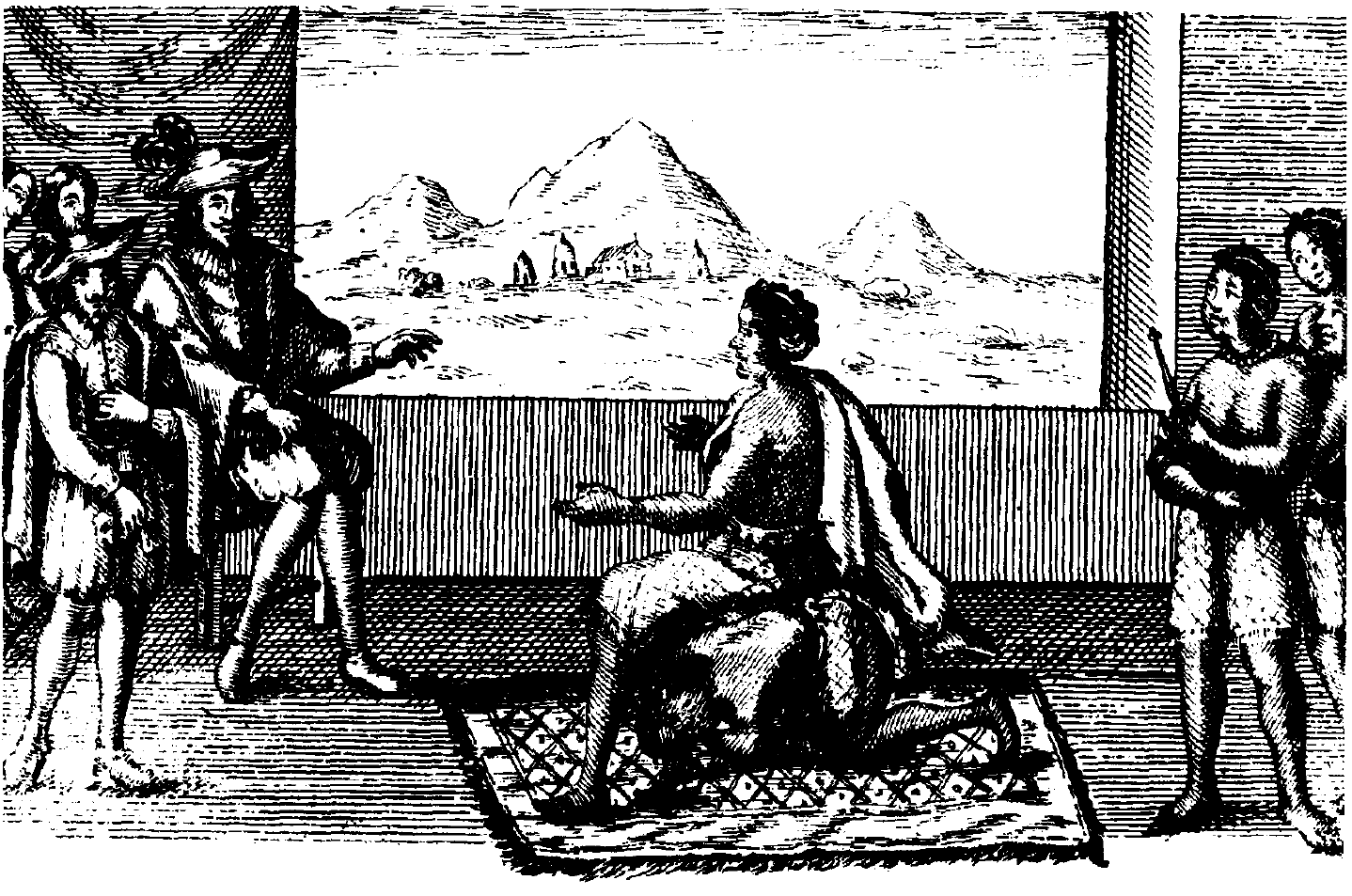
An illustration of Queen Nzinga in peace negotiations with the Portuguese governor in Luanda in 1657

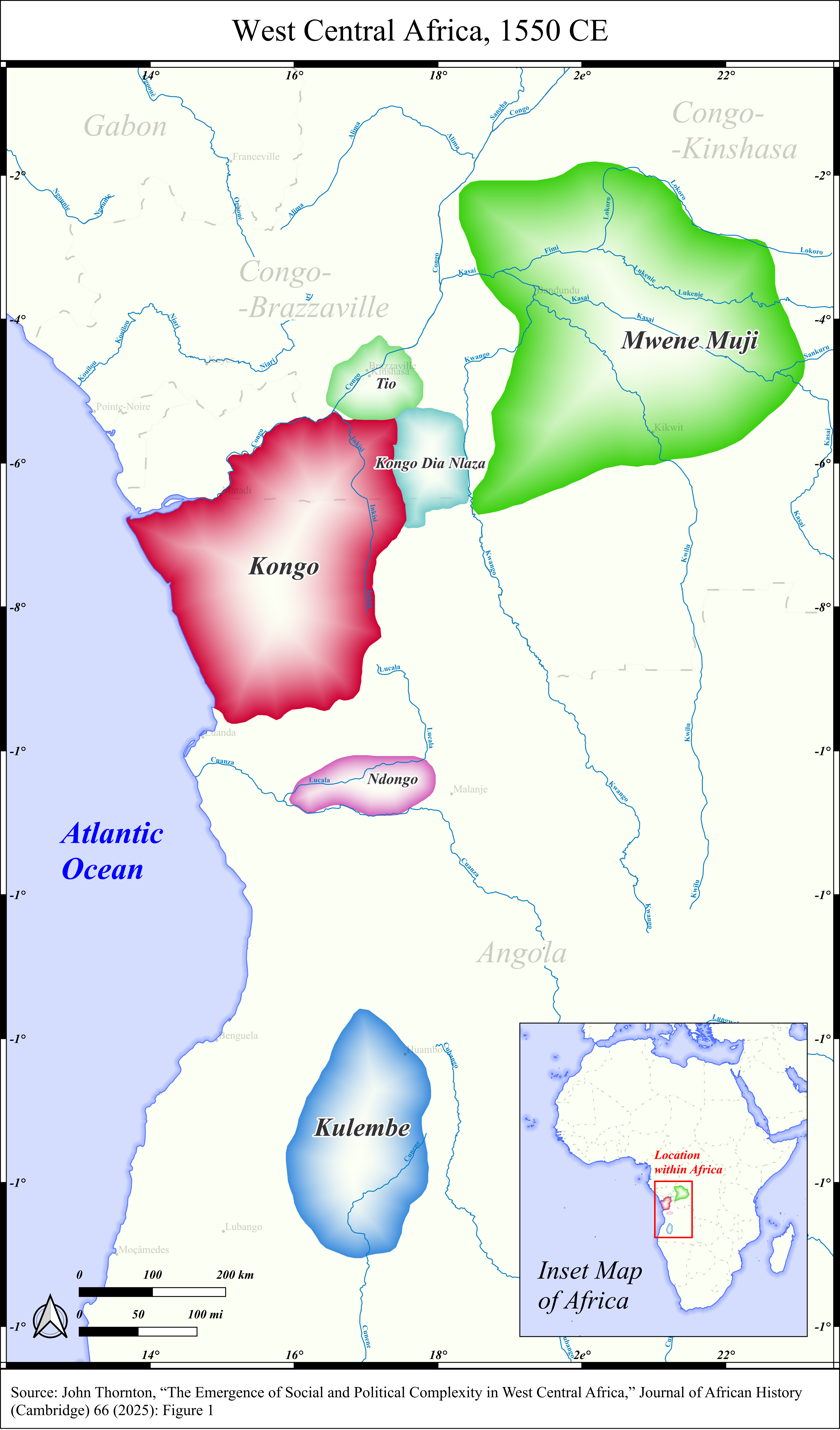
Major states of the western Congo Basin, c. 1550

To the south of the Kingdom of the Kongo, around the river Kwanza, there were various important states. The most important of these was the Kingdom of Ndongo or Dongo, ruled by the ngolas (chief or king). At the time of the arrival of the Portuguese, Ngola Kiluange was in power. By maintaining a policy of alliances with neighbouring states, he managed to hold out against the foreigners for several decades but in the late 1620s was eventually beheaded in Luanda. Years later, the Ndongo rose to prominence again when Jinga Mbandi (Queen Jinga) took power in 1631. A wily politician, she kept the Portuguese in check with carefully prepared agreements. After undertaking various journeys she succeeded in 1635 in forming a grand coalition with the states of Matamba and Ndongo, Kongo, Kassanje, Dembos, and Kissamas. At the head of this formidable alliance, she forced the Portuguese to retreat.

Meanwhile, Portugal had lost its King and the Spanish took control of the Portuguese monarchy. By this time, focus on Portugal's overseas territories had taken secondary importance. The Dutch took advantage of this situation and occupied Luanda in 1641. Jinga entered into an alliance with the Dutch, thereby strengthening her coalition and confining the Portuguese to Massangano, which they fortified strongly, sallying forth on occasion to capture slaves in a later war. Slaves from Angola were essential to the development of the Portuguese colony of Brazil, but the traffic had been interrupted by these events.

After Portugal regained its independence, a large force from Brazil under the command of Salvador Correia de Sá retook Luanda in 1648, leading to the return of the Portuguese in large numbers. Jinga's coalition then fell apart; the absence of their Dutch allies with their firearms and the strong position of Correia de Sá delivered a deadly blow to the morale of the native forces. After Jinga died in 1663, the King of Congo committed all his forces in an attempt to capture the island of Luanda, occupied by Correia de Sá, but they were defeated and lost their independence. The Kingdom of Ndongo submitted to the Portuguese Crown in 1671.

== Portuguese Angola ==
The Portuguese colony of Angola was founded in 1575 with the arrival of Paulo Dias de Novais with a hundred Portuguese families and 400 soldiers. Its center at Luanda was granted the status of city in 1605.

Trade was mostly with the Portuguese colony of Brazil; Brazilian ships were the most numerous in the ports of Luanda and Benguela. By this time, Angola, a Portuguese colony, was in fact like a colony of Brazil, paradoxically another Portuguese colony. A strong Brazilian influence was also exercised by the Jesuits in religion and education. War gradually gave way to the philosophy of trade. Slave-trading routes and the conquests that made them possible were the driving force for activities between the different areas; independent states slave markets were now focused on the demands of American slavery. In the high plains (the Planalto), the most important states were those of Bié and Bailundo, the latter being noted for its production of foodstuffs and rubber. The interior remained largely free of Portuguese control as late as the 19th century.

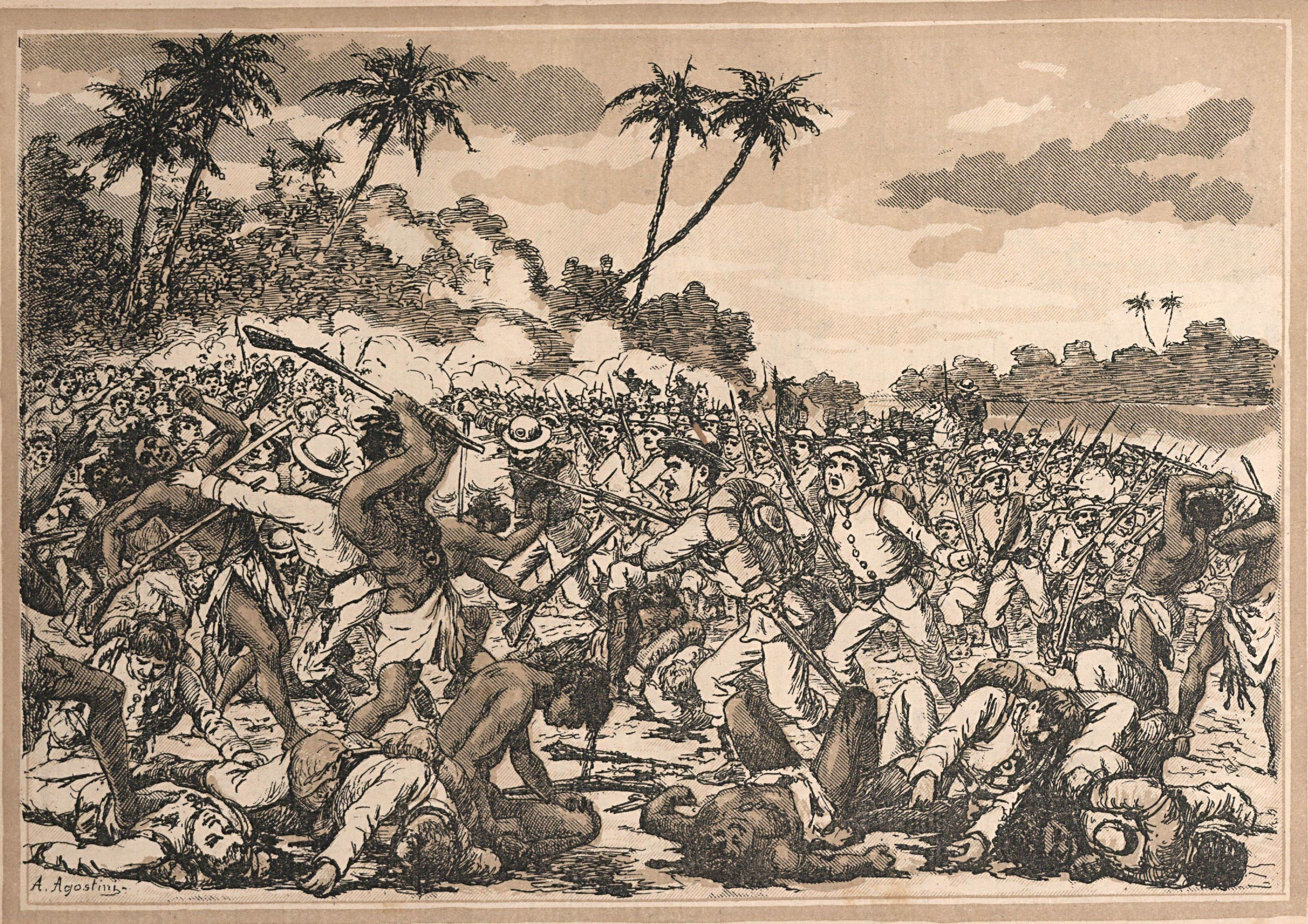
In the Battle of the Cunene, Portuguese forces were defeated by Ovambo warriors on 25 September 1904.

The slave trade was not abolished until 1836, and in 1844 Angola's ports were opened to foreign shipping with the Portuguese unable to enforce the laws, especially dependent on English naval security. This facilitated the continuation of slave smuggling to the United States and Brazil. By 1850, Luanda was one of the largest Portuguese cities in the Portuguese Empire outside Mainland Portugal exporting (together with Benguela) palm and peanut oil, wax, copal, timber, ivory, cotton, coffee, and cocoa, among many other products – almost all the produce of a continued forced labour system.

The Berlin Conference compelled Portugal to move towards the immediate occupation of all the territories it laid claim to but had been unable to effectively conquer. The territory of Cabinda (province), to the north of the river Zaire, was also ceded to Portugal on the legal basis of the Treaty of Simulambuko Protectorate, concluded between the Portuguese Crown and the princes of Cabinda in 1885. In the 19th century they slowly and hesitantly began to establish themselves in the interior. Angola as a Portuguese colony encompassing the present territory was not established before the end of the 19th century, and "effective occupation", as required by the Berlin Conference (1884) was achieved only by the 1920s.

Colonial economic strategy was based on agriculture and the export of raw materials. Trade in rubber and ivory, together with the taxes imposed on the population of the Empire (including the mainland), brought vast income to Lisbon.

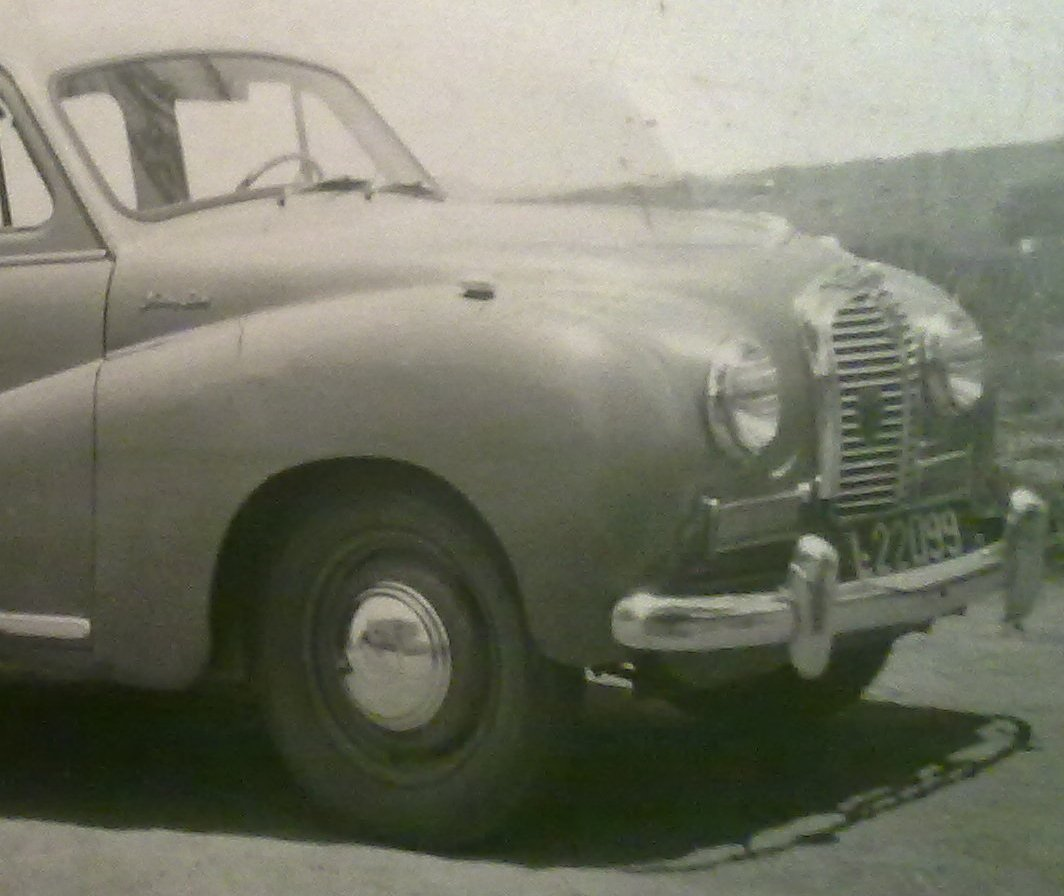
A car in Angola in 1949

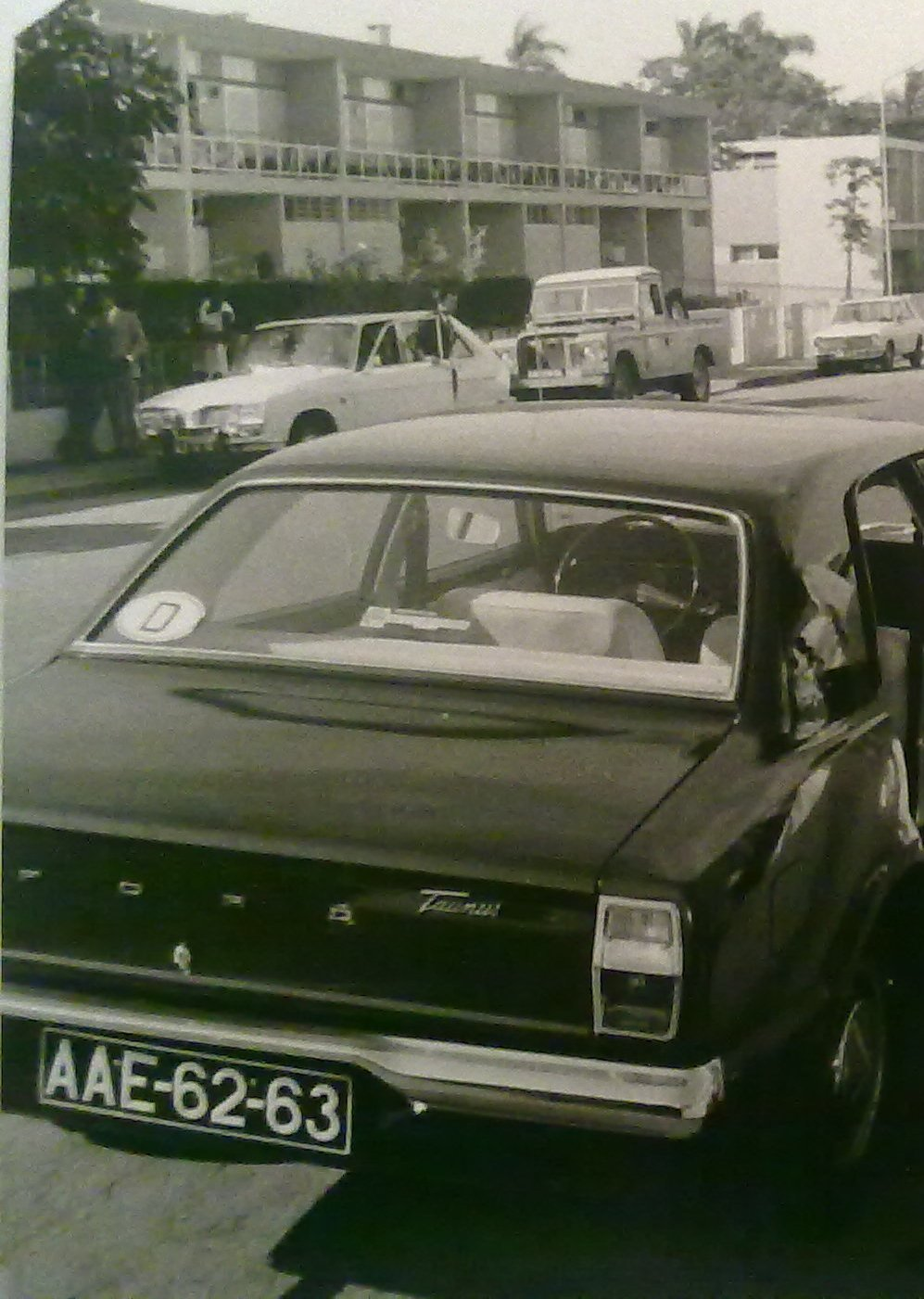
A Ford Taunus in Angola in 1972

Portuguese policy in Angola was modified by certain reforms introduced at the beginning of the twentieth century. The fall of the Portuguese monarchy and a favourable international climate led to reforms in administration, agriculture, and education. In 1951, with the advent of the New State regime (Estado Novo) extended to the colony, Angola became a province of Portugal (Ultramarine Province), called the Província Ultramarina de Angola (Overseas Province of Angola).

However, Portuguese rule remained characterized by deep-seated racism, mass forced labour, and an almost complete failure to modernize the country. By 1960, after 400 years of colonial rule, there was not a single university in the entire territory. To counter this lack of education facilities, overtly political organizations first appeared in the 1950s, and began to make organized demands for human and civil rights, initiating diplomatic campaigns throughout the world in their fight for independence. The Portuguese regime, meanwhile, refused to accede to the nationalists' demands for independence, thereby provoking the armed conflict that started in 1961 when guerrillas attacked colonial assets in cross-border operations in northeastern Angola. The war came to be known as the Colonial War.

In this struggle, the principal protagonists were the MPLA (Popular Movement for the Liberation of Angola), founded in 1956, the FNLA (National Liberation Front of Angola), which appeared in 1961, and UNITA (National Union for the Total Independence of Angola), founded in 1966. After many years of conflict, the nation gained its independence on 11 November 1975, after the 1974 coup d'état in Lisbon, Portugal. Portugal's new leaders began a process of democratic change at home and acceptance of the independence of its former colonies.

== Independence and civil war ==
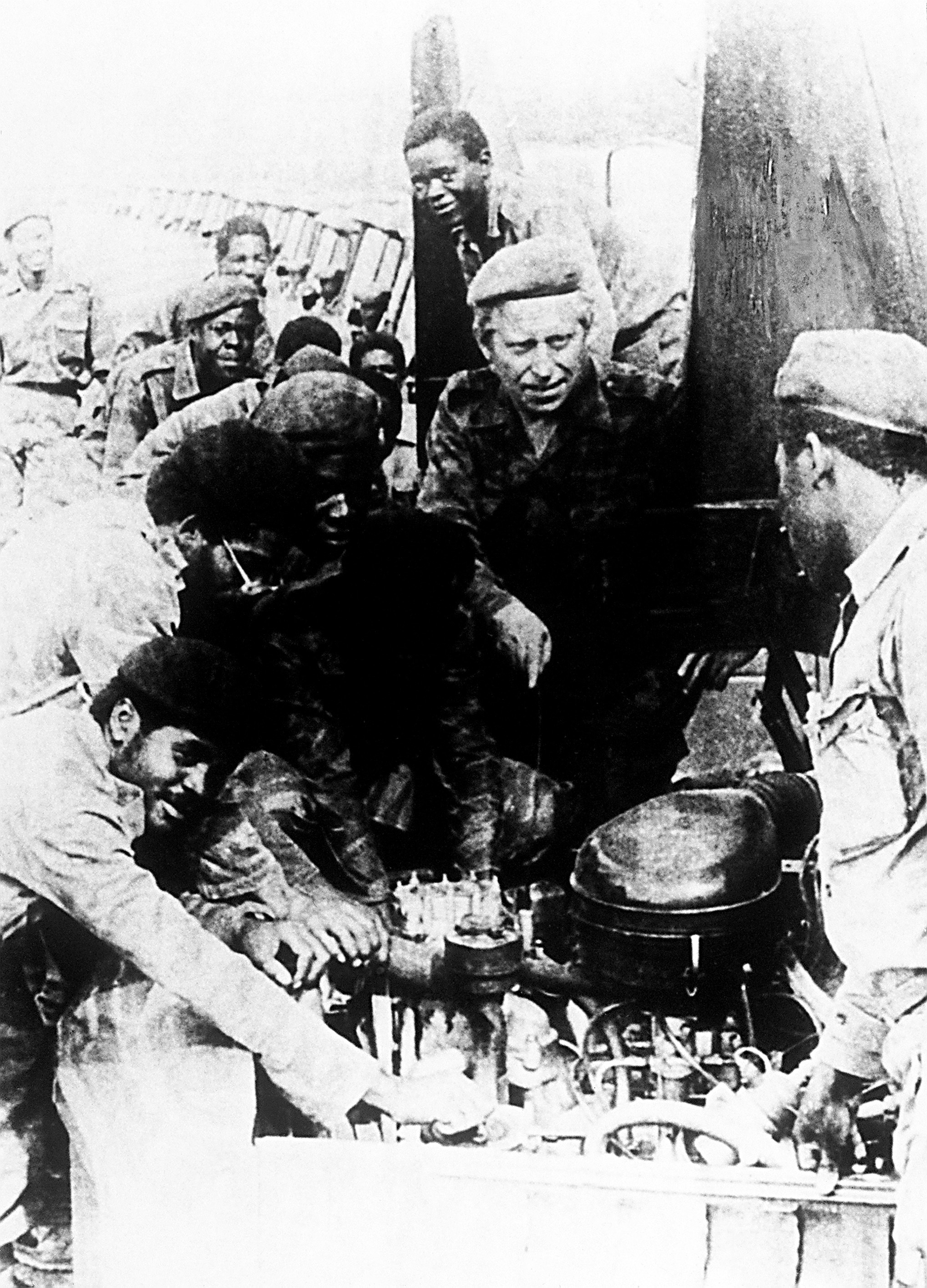
Soviet and Eastern Bloc military advisors training MPLA troops in Angola in 1983

A 1974 coup d'état in Portugal established a military government led by President António de Spínola. The Spínola government agreed to give all of Portugal's colonies independence, and handed power in Angola over to a coalition of the three largest nationalist movements, the MPLA, UNITA, and the FNLA, through the Alvor Agreement. The coalition quickly broke down, however, and the country descended into civil war. The MPLA gained control of the capital Luanda and much of the rest of the country. With the support of the United States, Zaïre and South Africa intervened militarily in favour of the FNLA and UNITA with the intention of taking Luanda before the declaration of independence. In response, Cuba intervened in favor of the MPLA. In the meantime the South Africans and UNITA had come as close as 200 km to the south of the capital, the FNLA and Zairian forces as far as Kifangondo, 30 km to the east.

With Cuban support, the MPLA held Luanda and declared independence as the Angolan People's Republic on 11 November 1975, the day the Portuguese left the country. Agostinho Neto became the first president. FNLA and UNITA proclaimed their own short-lived republics (the Angolan Democratic Republic and the Angolan Social Democratic Republic) on 24 November 1975, for the zones they controlled with Holden Roberto and Jonas Savimbi as co-presidents of the Angolan People's Democratic Republic in Huambo. This joint FNLA-UNITA government was dissolved on 11 February 1976 after a MPLA offensive. By the end of January 1976 the MPLA army (FAPLA) and the Cubans had all but crushed FNLA, Zairians and UNITA, and the South African forces withdrew.

On 27 May 1977, a coup attempt, including some former members of the MPLA government such as Nito Alves, led to retaliation by the government and Cuban forces, resulting in the execution of thousands, if not tens of thousands. Alves was tortured and killed. The movement is known as Fraccionismo.

The proxy war continued. The MPLA government, recognized internationally (although not by the United States), requested that Cuban forces remain in the country. Led by Jonas Savimbi, UNITA received clandestine support from the U.S. and other nations and took up military resistance in the southeast of the country while the MPLA government was supported by the USSR and Eastern Bloc countries. South Africa continued to pursue South-West Africa People's Organisation (SWAPO) forces in Southern Angola, soon established bases and increased support of UNITA, which gained control of more and more territory. In an effort to deliver a final blow to UNITA and to drive South Africa out of the country, in 1987 the People's Armed Forces for the Liberation of Angola (FAPLA), with Soviet support, launched a campaign fraught with failures and defeats. Again, the Cubans intervened, stopping UNITA and South African advances, leading to the Battle of Cuito Cuanavale from 13 January to 23 March, the largest battle in African history since World War II.

The MPLA and the U.S. had been in negotiations for a peaceful solution since June 1987. The U.S. agreed to include Cuba in direct talks. Cuba joined the negotiations 28 January 1988; South Africa joined 9 March. Angola, Cuba and South Africa signed the Tripartite Accord on 22 December 1988, in which the withdrawal of Cuban troops from Angola was linked to the retreat of South African soldiers from Angola and Namibia.

The Bicesse Accord in 1991 spelled out an electoral process for a democratic Angola under the supervision of the United Nations. MPLA won the first round with 49% of the votes, against 40% for UNITA. UNITA leader Jonas Savimbi rejected the results and returned to war. From 30 October to 1 November 1992 the Halloween Massacre occurred in which thousands of UNITA and FNLA supporters in Luanda were killed by MPLA troops. Estimates for the death toll nationwide reach 25,000 to 30,000. A second peace accord, the Lusaka Protocol, was brokered in Lusaka, Zambia and signed on 20 November 1994.

The peace accord between the government and UNITA provided for the integration of former UNITA insurgents into the government and armed forces. However, in 1995, localized fighting resumed. A national unity government was installed in April 1997, but serious fighting resumed in late 1998 when Savimbi renewed the war for a second time, claiming that the MPLA was not fulfilling its obligations. The UN Security Council voted on 28 August 1997, to impose sanctions on UNITA. The Angolan military launched a massive offensive in 1999 that destroyed UNITA's conventional capacity and recaptured all major cities previously held by Savimbi's forces. Savimbi then declared that UNITA would return to guerrilla tactics, and much of the country remained in turmoil.

The extended civil war rendered hundreds of thousands of people homeless. Up to 1 million lives may have been lost in fighting over the past quarter century. It only ended when Savimbi was killed in 2002.

== Post-independence ==
A Russian freighter delivered 500 tons of Ukrainian 7.62 mm ammunition to Simportex, a division of the Angolan government, with the help of a shipping agent in London on 21 September 2000. The ship's captain declared his cargo "fragile" to minimize inspection. The next day, the MPLA began attacking UNITA, winning victories in several battles from 22 to 25 September. The government gained control over military bases and diamond mines in Lunda Norte and Lunda Sul, hurting Savimbi's ability to pay his troops.

Angola agreed to trade oil to Slovakia in return for arms, buying six Sukhoi Su-17 attack aircraft on 3 April 2000. The Spanish government in the Canary Islands prevented a Ukrainian freighter from delivering 636 tons of military equipment to Angola on 24 February 2001. The captain of the ship had inaccurately reported his cargo, falsely claiming the ship carried automobile parts. The Angolan government admitted Simportex had purchased arms from Rosvooruzhenie, the Russian state-owned arms company, and acknowledged the captain might have violated Spanish law by misreporting his cargo, a common practice in arms smuggling to Angola.

Government troops captured and destroyed UNITA's Epongoloko base in Benguela province and Mufumbo base in Cuanza Sul in October 2001. The Slovak government sold fighter jets to the Angolan government in 2001 in violation of the European Union Code of Conduct on Arms Exports.

Government troops killed Savimbi on 22 February 2002, in Moxico province. UNITA Vice President António Dembo took over, but died from diabetes twelve days later on 3 March, and Secretary-General Paulo Lukamba Gato became UNITA's leader. After Savimbi's death, the government came to a crossroads over how to proceed. After initially indicating the counter-insurgency might continue, the government announced it would halt all military operations on 13 March. Military commanders for UNITA and the MPLA met in Cassamba and agreed to a cease-fire. However, Carlos Morgado, UNITA's spokesman in Portugal, said that the UNITA's Portugal wing had been under the impression General Kamorteiro, the UNITA general who agreed to the ceasefire, had been captured more than a week earlier. Morgado did say that he had not heard from Angola since Savimbi's death. The military commanders signed a Memorandum of Understanding as an addendum to the Lusaka Protocol in Luena on 4 April, Dos Santos and Lukamba Gato observing.

The United Nations Security Council passed Resolution 1404 on 18 April, extending the monitoring mechanism of sanctions by six months. Resolutions 1412 and 1432, passed on 17 May and 15 August respectively, suspended the UN travel ban on UNITA officials for 90 days each, finally abolishing the ban through Resolution 1439 on 18 October. UNAVEM III, extended an additional two months by Resolution 1439, ended on 19 December.

In August 2002, UNITA declared itself a political party and officially demobilised its armed forces. That same month, the United Nations Security Council replaced the United Nations Office in Angola with the United Nations Mission in Angola, a larger, non-military, political presence.

The civil war produced four million internally displaced persons (IDPs), one third of Angola's population. The government spent $187 million settling IDPs between 4 April 2002 and 2004, after which the World Bank gave $33 million to continue the settling process. Militant forces laid approximately 15 million landmines by 2002. The HALO Trust charity began demining in 1994, destroying 30,000 by July 2007. There are 1,100 Angolans and seven foreign workers who are working for HALO Trust in Angola, with operations expected to finish sometime between 2011 and 2014.

Human Rights Watch estimates UNITA and the government employed more than 86,000 and 3,000 child soldiers respectively, some forcibly impressed, during the war. Human rights analysts found 5,000 to 8,000 underage girls married to UNITA militants. Some girls were ordered to go and forage for food to provide for the troops. If the girls did not bring back enough food as judged by their commander, then the girls would not eat. After victories, UNITA commanders would be rewarded with women who were often then sexually abused. The government and UN agencies identified 190 child soldiers in the Angolan army and relocated seventy of them by November 2002, but the government continued to knowingly employ other underage soldiers.

Fernando Vendrell produced and Zézé Gamboa directed The Hero, a film about the life of average Angolans after the civil war, in 2004. The film follows the lives of three individuals; Vitório, a war veteran crippled by a landmine who returns to Luanda, Manu, a young boy searching for his soldier father, and Joana, a teacher who mentors the boy and begins a love affair with Vitório. The Hero won the 2005 Sundance World Dramatic Cinema Jury Grand Prize. A joint Angolan, Portuguese, and French production, Gamboa filmed The Hero entirely in Angola.

José Eduardo dos Santos stepped down as President of Angola after 38 years in 2017, being peacefully succeeded by João Lourenço, Santos' chosen successor. However, President João Lourenço started a campaign against corruption of the dos Santos era. In November 2017, Isabel dos Santos, the billionaire daughter of former President José Eduardo dos Santos, was fired from her position as head of the country's state oil company Sonangol. In August 2020, José Filomeno dos Santos, son of Angola's former president, was sentenced for five years in jail for fraud and corruption.

In July 2022, ex-president José Eduardo dos Santos died in Spain.

In August 2022, the ruling party, MPLA, won another outright majority and President Joao Lourenco won a second five-year term in the election. However, the election was the tightest in Angola's history.

== See also ==
- History of Africa
- History of Southern Africa
- List of presidents of Angola
- Politics of Angola
- Portuguese West Africa
- Slavery in Angola
- Cities:
  - Benguela history and timeline
  - Luanda history and timeline
- Arquivo Histórico Nacional (Angola) (national archives)
