= United Nations Security Council Resolution 1439 =

UN Security Council Resolution 1439
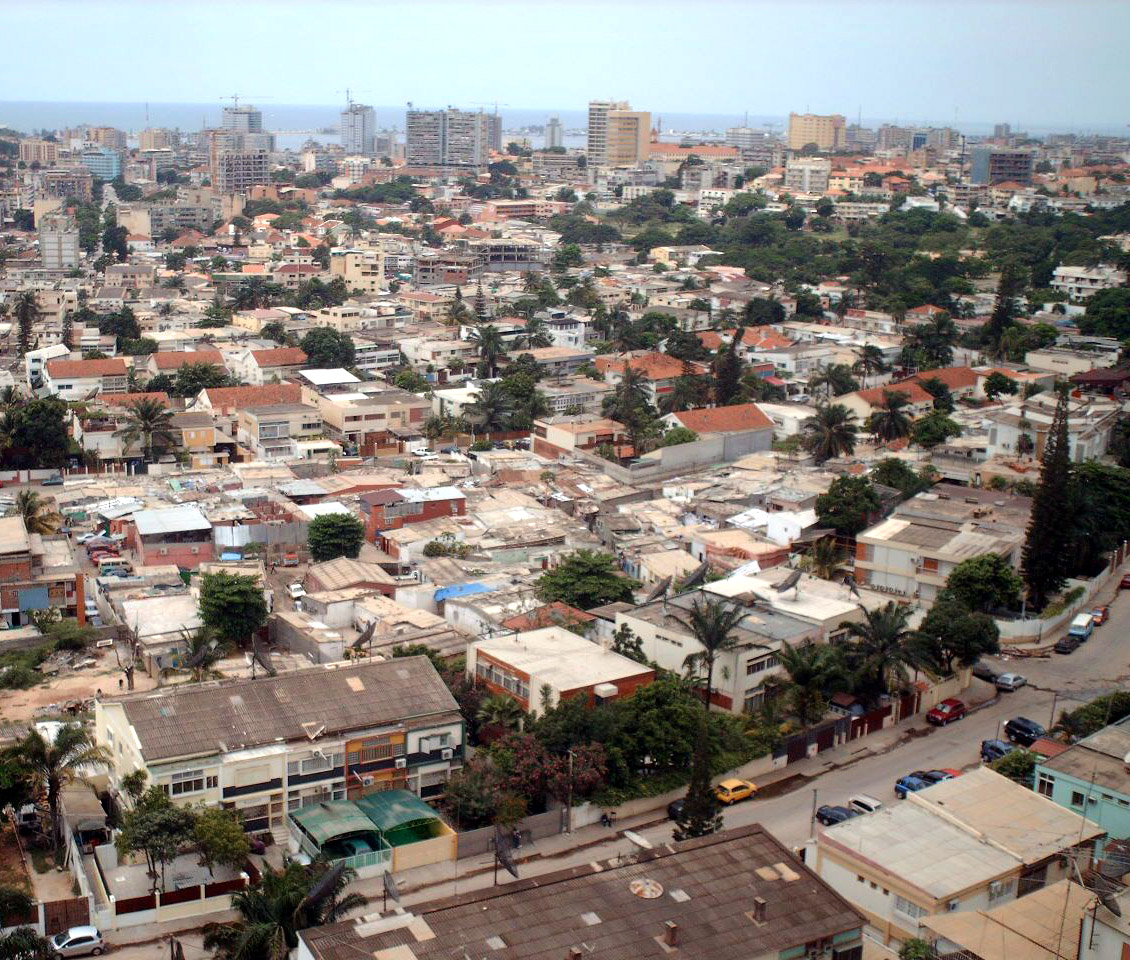
- Angolan capital Luanda
- Date: 18 October 2002
- Meeting no.: 4,628
- Code: S/RES/1439 (Document)
- Subject: The situation in Angola
- Voting summary: 15 voted for; None voted against; None abstained
- Result: Adopted

Security Council composition
- Permanent members: China; France; Russia; United Kingdom; United States
- Non-permanent members: Bulgaria; Cameroon; Colombia; Guinea; Ireland; Mauritius; Mexico; Norway; Singapore; Syria

United Nations Security Council resolution 1439, adopted unanimously on 18 October 2002, after reaffirming Resolution 864 (1993) and all subsequent resolutions on Angola, particularly resolutions 1127 (1997), 1173 (1998), 1237 (1999), 1295 (2000), 1336 (2001), 1348 (2001), 1374 (2001), 1404 (2002), 1412 (2002) and 1432 (2002), the council extended the monitoring mechanism of sanctions against UNITA for two months until 19 December 2002 and lifted a travel ban against its members.

The security council expressed concern at the effects of the civil war on the humanitarian situation, and welcomed steps taken by the Angolan government to implement the Lusaka Protocol and other agreements. Acting under Chapter VII of the United Nations Charter, the council extended the monitoring mechanism for an additional period of two months and requested it to report periodically to the committee established in Resolution 864 with an additional report by 13 December 2002. Furthermore, it was required to report within 10 days on an action plan for its future work. The Chairman of the committee was required to submit the report by 19 December 2002 to the council, particularly with regard to violations of the sanctions.

The Secretary-General Kofi Annan was asked to appoint two experts to serve on the monitoring mechanism and make financial arrangements to this effect. All countries were called upon to co-operate with the mechanism during the course of its mandate.

Finally, the resolution decided that the travel ban against UNITA officials would end on 14 November 2002 and a review of all other sanctions against UNITA would take place by 19 November 2002.

== See also ==
- Angolan Civil War
- List of United Nations Security Council Resolutions 1401 to 1500 (2002–2003)
