= Chingunji =

Chingunji may refer to the following political leaders of Angola's UNITA rebel movement

- David Chingunji (died 1970), top commander, brother of Kafundanga
- Dinho Chingunji (born 1964), son of Kafundanga, nephew of David
- Kafundanga Chingunji (died 1974), first Chief of Staff
- Tito Chingunji (died 1991), foreign secretary
