= Kleier =

Kleier is a surname. Notable people with the surname include:

- Alan Kleier, American engineer and businessman
- Roger Kleier (born 1958), American composer, guitarist, improviser, and producer
- Sean Kleier (born 1987), American actor

== See also ==
- Kleiber
- Kleiner
