= Tito Chingunji =

Angolan rebel

- Born: Pedro Ngueve Jonatão Chingunji c. 1955
- Died: August 1991 (aged 36); Angola
- Spouse: Raquel "Romy" Matos
- Children: 3
- Parent(s): Jonatao and Violeta Chingunji
- Relatives: Dinho (nephew); David and Kafundanga (brothers)

Pedro Ngueve Jonatão "Tito" Chingunji (c. 1955 - August 1991) served as the foreign secretary of Angola's National Union for the Total Independence of Angola (UNITA) rebel movement in the 1980s and early 1990s. In the mid-1980s, he was UNITA's representative in Washington, D.C.

== Death ==
Chingunji was murdered in Angola in 1991 under circumstances still not fully understood. Some blamed his murder on UNITA leader Jonas Savimbi, who purportedly viewed Chingunji as a political threat. Fred Bridgland, Savimbi's biographer and longtime supporter, claimed that between 60 and 70 of Chingunji's relatives were killed following his own execution, including his own children who were swung against trees. Savimbi, however, suggested Chingunji's killing was more likely the work of UNITA dissidents or the Central Intelligence Agency, which, Savimbi argued, had supported Chingunji in an effort to overthrow him.
