= United Nations Security Council Resolution 1404 =

UN Security Council Resolution 1404
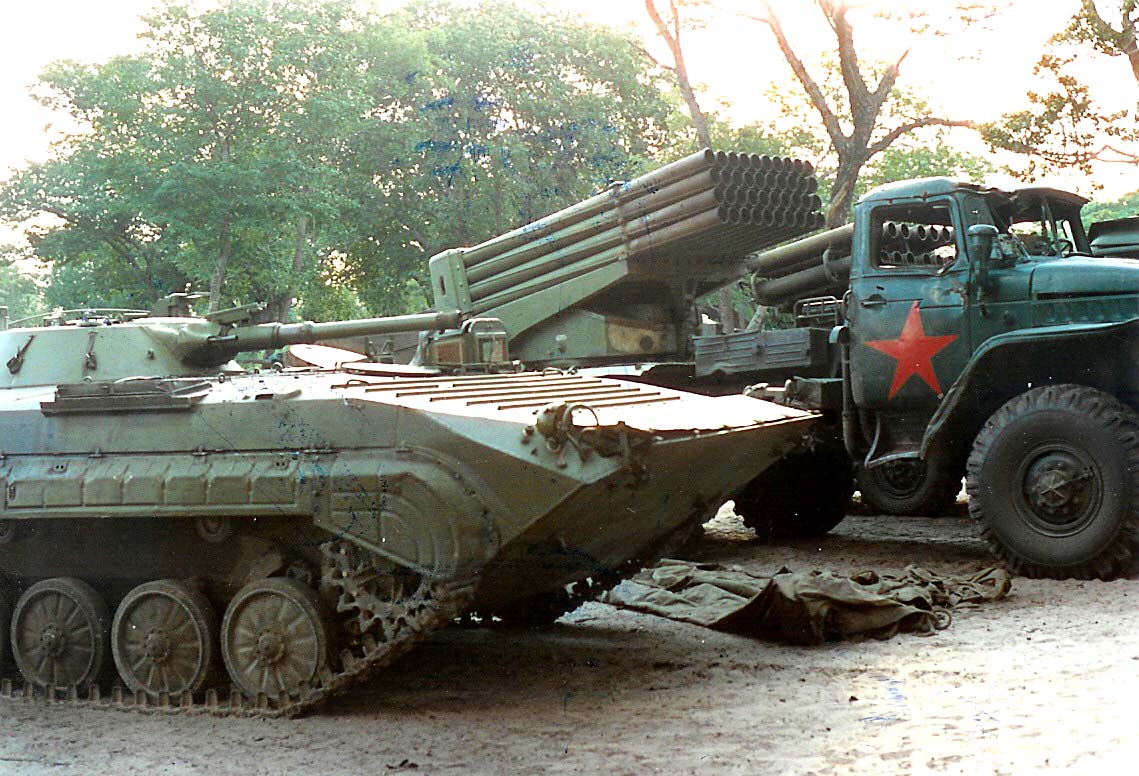
- Demobilized UNITA vehicles
- Date: 18 April 2002
- Meeting no.: 4,514
- Code: S/RES/1404 (Document)
- Subject: The situation in Angola
- Voting summary: 15 voted for; None voted against; None abstained
- Result: Adopted

Security Council composition
- Permanent members: China; France; Russia; United Kingdom; United States
- Non-permanent members: Bulgaria; Cameroon; Colombia; Guinea; Ireland; Mauritius; Mexico; Norway; Singapore; Syria

United Nations Security Council resolution 1404, adopted unanimously on 18 April 2002, after reaffirming Resolution 864 (1993) and all subsequent resolutions on Angola, particularly resolutions 1127 (1997), 1173 (1998), 1237 (1999), 1295 (2000), 1336 (2001), 1348 (2001) and 1374 (2001), the council extended the monitoring mechanism of sanctions against UNITA until 19 October 2002.

The security council expressed concern at the effects of the civil war on the humanitarian situation, determining that the situation remained a threat to international peace and security. It welcomed the ceasefire agreement on 4 April 2002 and declared that the monitoring mechanism would be in place as long as necessary. Acting under Chapter VII of the United Nations Charter, the council extended the monitoring mechanism for an additional period of six months and requested it to report periodically to the committee established in Resolution 864 with an additional report by 15 October 2002. The chairman of the committee was required to submit the report by 19 October 2002 to the council.

The Secretary-General Kofi Annan was asked to appoint four experts to serve on the monitoring mechanism and make financial arrangements to this effect. Finally, all countries were called upon to co-operate with the mechanism during the course of its mandate.

== See also ==
- Angolan Civil War
- List of United Nations Security Council Resolutions 1401 to 1500 (2002–2003)
