= David Chingunji =

Angolan politician

- Born: 1945
- Died: 1970 (aged 24–25)
- Other name: David "Samwimbila" Chingunji
- Occupations: Commander, politician
- Known for: being a top commander in The National Union for the Total Independence of Angola (UNITA)
- Father: Kafundanga Chingunji

David "Samwimbila" Chingunji (born in 1945, died in 1970) served as a top commander in the National Union for the Total Independence of Angola (UNITA), who became pro-Western rebels in the subsequent Angolan Civil War (1975–2002). David Chingunji was the nephew of Tito Chingunji, who served as the foreign secretary of Angola's UNITA rebel movement in the 1980s and early 1990s.

== Death and aftermath ==
David Chingunji died when UNITA forces tried to ambush Portuguese forces in 1970. Some said UNITA leader Jonas Savimbi, fearing a competitor for control of UNITA, ordered Chingunji's assassination, alleging Chingunji had opposed the planned ambush but Savimbi insisted. Some witnesses say non-Portuguese killers shot Chingunji in the back.

He had trained in the People's Republic of China and the Chinese government openly named him as a possible successor to Savimbi. All of his brothers, with the exception of Dinho, died in mysterious circumstances. Twenty-one years later, Tito Chingunji was also murdered in Angola (which is the same place where his nephew David was murdered) in 1991 under circumstances that are still not fully understood.

== See also ==
- List of unsolved murders (1900–1979)
