= United Patriotic Front =

United Patriotic Front Frente Patriótica Unida
- Abbreviation: FPU
- Leader: Adalberto Costa Júnior
- Founded: 5 October 2021
- Ideology: Big tent
- Coalition members: UNITA; Democratic Bloc; PRA JÁ
- Colours: Blue; Green; Red
- National Assembly: 90 / 220

The United Patriotic Front (Portuguese: Frente Patriótica Unida, FPU) is an Angolan opposition political coalition led by the UNITA party and its leader, Adalberto Costa Júnior.

Due to the fact that the FPU could not register for the elections, the remaining members of the coalition (Democratic Bloc and PRA JÁ) decided not to participate in the elections and support the UNITA lists.

== History ==
On October 5, 2021 the opposition parties UNITA, Democratic Bloc and "PRA JÁ Servir Angola" announced the formation of a coalition called United Patriotic Front. Adalberto Costa Júnior of UNITA was announced as the FPU candidate to challenge President João Lourenço at a press conference by group spokesman Amândio Capoco. Capoco described it as "an alliance of Angolans eager for change". Adalberto Costa Júnior responded by announcing that he would be ready to challenge João Lourenço, declaring that "Our homeland is crying out for change", describing the country as "stricken by despair, by impoverishment".

In March 2022, the FPU was unable to register as a coalition due to non-compliance with electoral requirements, although it continues to exist as an opposition platform for the electoral campaign. The members of the Bloco Democrático and PRA JA-Servir Angola parties opted to sign up for UNITA's list, being excluded from the election.
