= Arlete Chimbinda =

Angolan politician (born 1960)

Arlete Leona Chimbinda
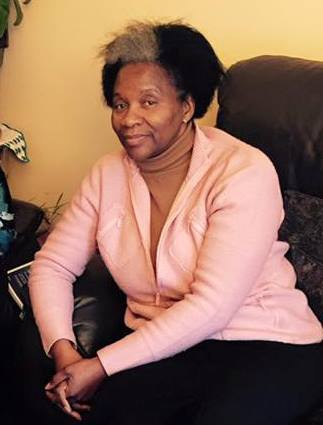
- Born: 1960 (age 65–66); Moxico Province, Angola
- Occupations: university professor and politician
- Political party: UNITA

Arlete Leona Chimbinda (born 1960) is an Angolan politician. She is a deputy and a university professor. She became a member of parliament in 2017 and she became the first vice-president of the Angolan political party National Union for the Total Independence of Angola UNITA in 2019. Chimbinda is a critic of her country's constitution and its President João Lourenço.

== Life ==
Chimbinda was born in Moxico Province in 1960. She studied to gain a first and then a masters degree in political science. She joined the National Union for the Total Independence of Angola party. and she became a university teacher.

On 28 September 2017 she became a Member of the National Assembly of Angola. She took one of the 51 seats won by her party making it second to the MPLA which had 150 seats. Chimbinda is a deputy as part of the National Electoral Circle.

In 2019 she was chosen as the first vice-president of UNITA by Adalberto Costa Júnior. Júnior had just taken over the role of leading UNITA. He chose Simão Albino Dembo as his second vice-president. Chiminda previous position as President of the Parliamentary party was assigned to Liberty Chiyaka from Huambo.

In October 2020 she called for a complete revision of Angola's constitution. Corruption remained a problem. The President was not elected by the people directly which made him less accountable. Promises had been made, she said, to end monopolies but the states monopoly of the country's media remains. She spoke out against João Lourenço and his record over three years. Education, inflation, access to electricity and clean water still remained significant issues she said.
