= Dinho Chingunji =

Angolan politician

Eduardo Jonatão Samuel "Dinho" Chingunji (son of Kafundanga Chingunji) (born 7 September 1964) served as a political leader in UNITA, a pro-Western rebel group in Angola. During Angola's civil war (1975–2002), rumors attributed the deaths of several members of his family to assassination plots ordered by UNITA leader Jonas Savimbi.

Angolan troops killed Savimbi in 2002, bringing the civil war to an end. UNITA held its ninth Congress in Viana, Angola from June 24 to 27, 2003. Chingunji, Isaías Samakuva, and Paulo Lukamba Gato contested UNITA's presidency at the Congress. Chingunji overwhelmingly lost to Samakuva, receiving only 20 votes to Samakuva's 1,067 votes and Gato's 277.

== See also ==
- 2000s in Angola
