= United Nations Security Council Resolution 1433 =

UN Security Council Resolution 1433
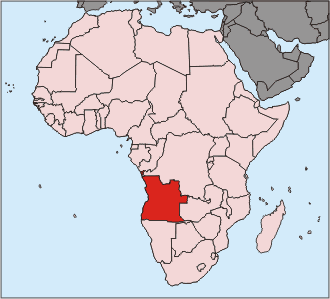
- Location of Angola in Africa
- Date: 15 August 2002
- Meeting no.: 4,604
- Code: S/RES/1433 (Document)
- Subject: The situation in Angola
- Voting summary: 15 voted for; None voted against; None abstained
- Result: Adopted

Security Council composition
- Permanent members: China; France; Russia; United Kingdom; United States
- Non-permanent members: Bulgaria; Cameroon; Colombia; Guinea; Ireland; Mauritius; Mexico; Norway; Singapore; Syria

United Nations Security Council resolution 1433, adopted unanimously on 15 August 2002, after recalling 696 (1991) and subsequent resolutions on the situation in Angola, particularly 1268 (1999), the Council authorised the establishment of the United Nations Mission in Angola (UNMA) as a follow-on mission to the United Nations Office in Angola (UNOA). Resolution 1433 was adopted on the same day the Council extended the suspension of travel restrictions against UNITA officials in Resolution 1432 (2002).

== Resolution ==
=== Observations ===
The Security Council reaffirmed the need for the full implementation of the Lusaka Protocol and other agreements, and supported adjustments to the mandate of UNOA. It viewed the United Nations presence in Angola as necessary to contribute to the consolidation of peace through the promotion of political, military, human rights, humanitarian and economic goals.

=== Acts ===
UNMA was established for an initial period of six months until 15 February 2003 and would be headed by the Special Representative of the Secretary-General. Its mandate would include provisions for assisting the parties to conclude the Lusaka Protocol, and to assist the Angolan government by:

(a) the protection and promotion of human rights, consolidation of peace and enhancement of the rule of law;
(b) providing assistance in demining activities;
(c) co-ordinating assistance to vulnerable groups;
(d) reintegration of demobilised soldiers;
(e) promotion of economic recovery;
(f) mobilise resources from the international community;
(g) providing electoral assistance to the Angolan government.

A child protection adviser was also approved. Finally, the Secretary-General Kofi Annan was requested to submit an interim report within 3 months on the work of UNMA.

== See also ==
- Angolan Civil War
- List of United Nations Security Council Resolutions 1401 to 1500 (2002–2003)
