= Isaías Samakuva =

Angolan politician

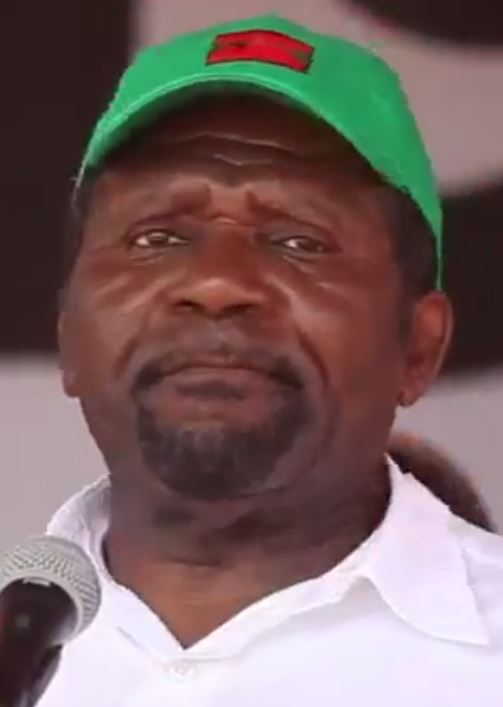

President of UNITA
- In office 20 June 2003 – 14 November 2019
- Preceded by: Paulo Lukamba Gato
- Succeeded by: Adalberto Costa Júnior

Personal details
- Born: 8 July 1946 (age 79) Kunje, Portuguese Angola
- Party: UNITA
- Children: 5

Isaías Henrique Ngola Samakuva (born 8 July 1946) is an Angolan politician who was the President of the National Union for the Total Independence of Angola (UNITA) from June 2003 to November 2019.

After UNITA leader, Jonas Savimbi and his immediate successor António Dembo died from injuries sustained in a February 2002 firefight with Angolan government troops, Samakuva was elected as President of UNITA, which had transformed itself into a peaceful opposition party, in 2003.

== Biography ==
Son of Henrique Ngola Samakuva and Rosália Ani Samakuva, Samakuva was born in Silva Porto-Gare (present Kunji), Bié Province.

In 1970, he was a professor at the Evangelical Mission House and then took a course in theology at the Seminary of Dondi, where he became an evangelical pastor. He formally joined UNITA in 1974 and, a year later, he was admitted as an official of the Ministry of Labour in the Transitional Government of Angola.

In 1976, due to political insecurity, he retired to the bush, settling in one of the bases of UNITA in the Military Region 25, moving then to Region 45, where he served as chief of staff of the command. Two years later, Samakuva was transferred to Region 11 to head the office of the leader of UNITA, Jonas Savimbi, thence to the region Kubango, which began coordinating the logistics of UNITA in the so-called on South front.

In 1979 he was a delegate to the 12th Annual Conference of UNITA and elected member of the Central Committee, having been transferred to South Africa as representative of the movement led by Jonas Savimbi in that country.

In 1984, he was appointed vice-president of the Foreign Affairs Committee of UNITA, and in 1986, at the party's sixth congress, he was elected to the permanent secretariat and to the direction of the cabinet of Jonas Savimbi. He was an official UNITA ambassador in Europe from 1989 to 1994 and again from 1998 to 2002. Between 1989 and 1993, he was the representative of UNITA in the United Kingdom; later he was delegated to Europe.

After the failure of the peace agreement signed in Lisbon (1991) and the Lusaka Protocol (1994), Samakuva led a party delegation to the Joint Commission established to monitor the implementation of the Lusaka Protocol.

In 2000, he was appointed head of the external mission of UNITA and, following the death of Jonas Savimbi in combat on February 22, 2002, he returned to Angola to discuss a ceasefire.

Samakuva was elected as President of UNITA in 2003 at the party's ninth congress. In 2007, at the tenth congress, he was re-elected to the post, defeating Abel Chivukuvuku.

Samakuva was the first candidate on UNITA's national list in the September 2008 legislative election. He was elected to a seat in the National Assembly in that election, but UNITA overall performed poorly in that election, winning only 16 out of 220 seats. Despite the party's objections to problems in the electoral process, Samakuva announced on 8 September 2008 that UNITA accepted the election results. The UNITA Permanent Committee subsequently met to consider the outcome of the election and Samakuva's leadership, and on 19 September 2008 it said in a statement that it "reaffirm[ed] its confidence" in Samakuva, blaming the party's poor showing primarily on abuses by the governing Popular Movement for the Liberation of Angola (MPLA).

He resigned as UNITA leader in November 2019 and was succeeded by Adalberto Costa Júnior.
