= Kunje =

Kunje Cunge
- Commune and town
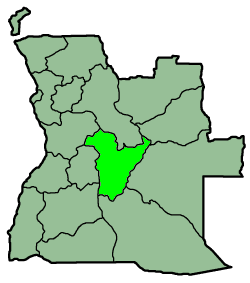

- Location in Angola
- Coordinates: 12°20′24″S 16°56′33″E
- Country: Angola
- Province: Bié
- Municipality: Kuito
- Time zone: UTC+1 (WAT)

Kunje is a town and commune in the municipality of Kuito, province of Bié, Angola.

It is the home town of UNITA President Isaías Samakuva. It is also home to a considerable amount of unexploded land mines.
