= Kleiber =

Kleiber is a German surname. Notable people with the surname include:

- Carlos Kleiber (1930–2004), Austrian conductor, son of Erich
- Charles Kleiber (1942–2025), Swiss architect and state secretary
- Dávid Kleiber (born 1990), Hungarian football player
- Erich Kleiber (1890–1956), Austrian-German conductor, father of Carlos
- Günther Kleiber (1931–2013), German communist politician
- Jolán Kleiber-Kontsek (1939–2022), Hungarian athlete
- Max Kleiber (1893–1976), Swiss agricultural biologist, known for Kleiber's law
- Stanislava Brezovar or Stanislava Kleiber (1937–2003), Slovenian ballerina

== See also ==
- Kleiber's law
