= Adalberto Costa Júnior =

Angolan politician

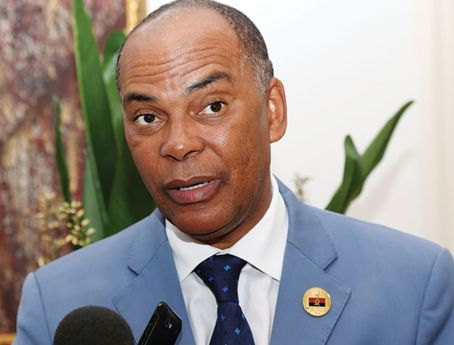
- Adalberto Costa

President of UNITA
- Incumbent
- Assumed office 15 November 2019
- Preceded by: Isaías Samakuva

Personal details
- Born: 8 May 1962 (age 64) Kunje, Portuguese Angola
- Party: UNITA

Adalberto Costa Júnior (born 8 May 1962) is an Angolan politician who is Presidential Candidate for the general elections in 2027, the current president of UNITA, member of the Pan-African Parliament since 2022 and member of the National Assembly of Angola.

He previously worked abroad as UNITA's representative, before returning to Angola in 2002 and becoming spokesperson of the party. In 2009 he became a national secretary party and later vice-president of UNITA's parliamentary group, then president of the group.

== Early life ==
Costa was born on 8 May 1962 in Kunje, which was part of Portuguese Angola at the time of his birth. His father, Adalberto Costa, was a UNITA militant, and he had eight other siblings. He was also the godson of UNITA founder and leader Jonas Savimbi. At the age of ten he started going to the Minor Seminary of Quipeio (Huambo Province) for his primary education. After completing his studies there he did his secondary studies at the Venâncio Deslandes Industrial and Commercial School.

He trained in electrotechnical engineering at the Instituto Superior de Engenharia do Porto and in public ethics at the Pontifical Gregorian University in Rome. However, during the proclamation of Angola's independence and subsequent civil war in 1975 he lost contact with his family.

== Political career ==
From 1991 to 1996 he was UNITA's representative in Portugal, and was then representative of UNITA in Italy and to the Vatican City from 1996 to 2002. From 2003 to 2008 he returned to Angola and became spokesperson for the party. He was also Provincial Secretary of UNITA in Luanda during this time. Afterward, from 2009 to 2011, he was National Secretary for Patriomonial Affairs of UNITA and then from 2012 to 2015 was vice-president of the UNITA Parliamentary Group. He assumed the role of president of the UNITA deputies from 2015 to 2019.

In November 2019, Costa was elected as president of UNITA, ending Isaias Samakuva's 16-year term.

In 2022, Adalberto Costa Júnior led a front that united opposition parties and members of the civil society, and obtained the best results ever of an opposition party in Angola. although, the credibility and transparency of the elections were highly challenged, He was able to obtain 43% of the results.

In November 2025, Adalberto Costa Júnior was reelected President of UNITA, and appointed Presidential candidate for the 2027 general elections that analysts say that will be the most contested elections in Sub-saharan Africa.
