= Charles Kleiber =

Swiss government official (1942–2025)

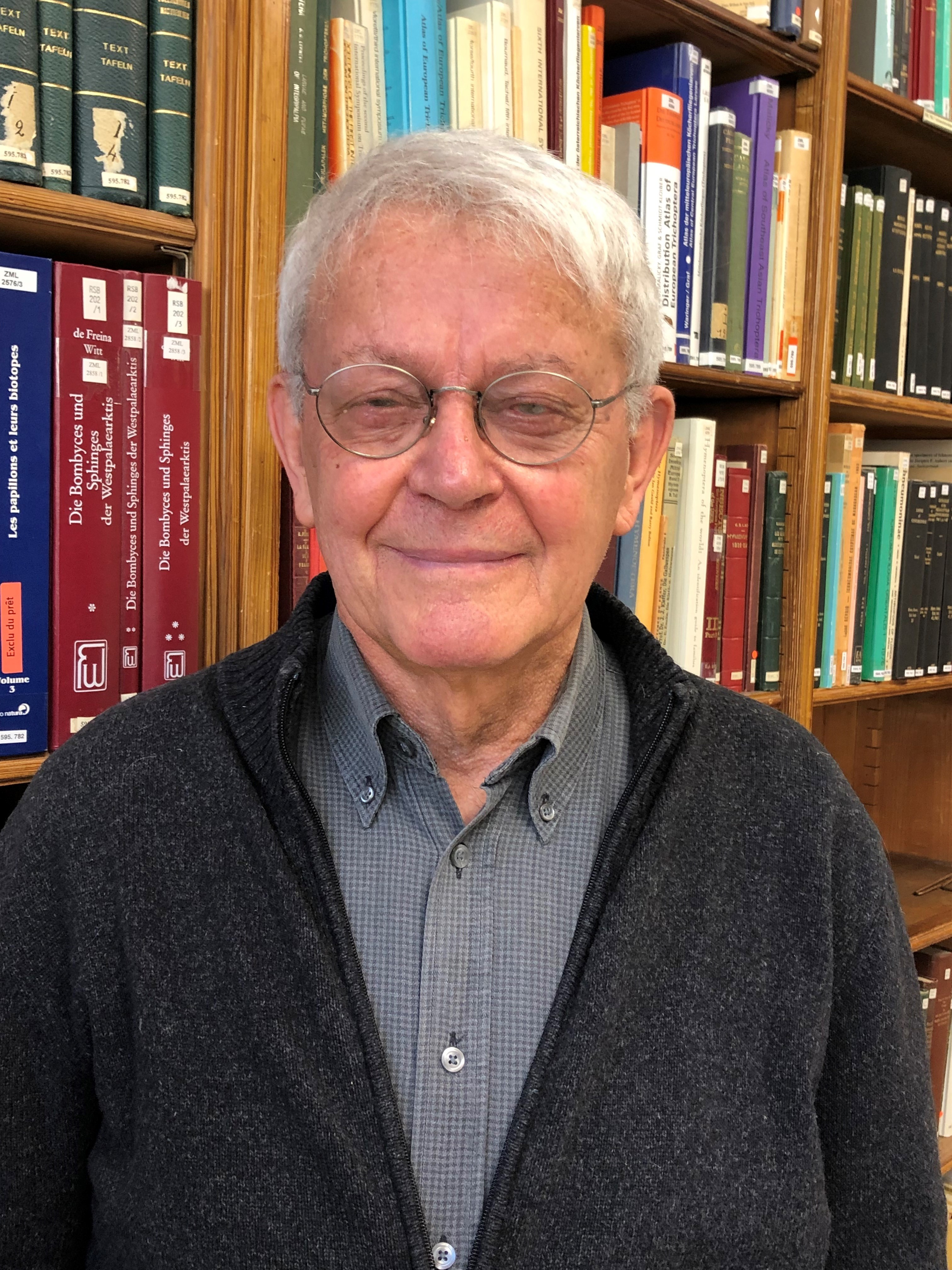
Charles Kleiber

Charles Kleiber (9 December 1942 – 13 January 2025) was a Swiss government official who served as a state secretary.

== Life and career ==
Educated as an architect at EPFL (1968), he worked as a consultant in hospital architecture during the 1970s. In 1981, he became director of the public health department of the canton Vaud. He submitted a PhD thesis on the topic of the impact of economic incentives on performance in medical care in 1991 at the University of Lausanne (published as Questions des soins with Payot, Lausanne, 1991). Kleiber was appointed director general of the university hospitals of Lausanne in 1992.

In 1997, he became State Secretary for Education and Research, at the time part of the Federal Department of Home Affairs, where he remained until his retirement in 2007. He opted to sign the Bologna declaration for Switzerland, against the resistance of the Swiss university rectors, initiating the controversial Bologna Process of university reforms.

Kleiber died on 13 January 2025, at the age of 82.

== Sources ==
- Pierre-Yves Donzé, Kleiber, Charles (1942-), Dictionnaire du Jura (2005, 2007)
