= United Nations Security Council Resolution 1432 =

UN Security Council Resolution 1432
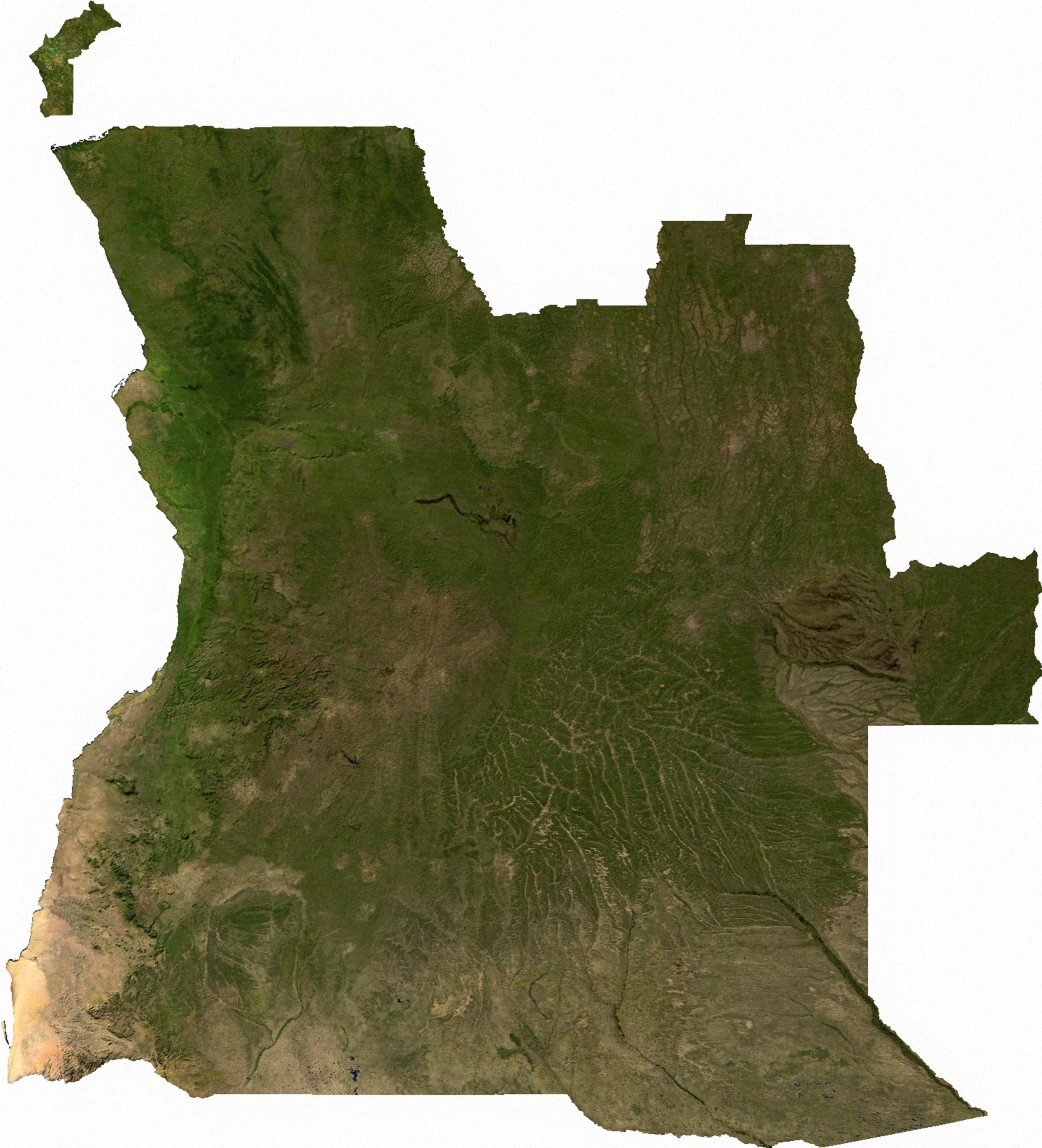
- Satellite image of Angola
- Date: 15 August 2002
- Meeting no.: 4,603
- Code: S/RES/1432 (Document)
- Subject: The situation in Angola
- Voting summary: 15 voted for; None voted against; None abstained
- Result: Adopted

Security Council composition
- Permanent members: China; France; Russia; United Kingdom; United States
- Non-permanent members: Bulgaria; Cameroon; Colombia; Guinea; Ireland; Mauritius; Mexico; Norway; Singapore; Syria

United Nations Security Council resolution 1432, adopted unanimously on 15 August 2002, after reaffirming resolutions 1127 (1997) and 1412 (2002), the Council extended the suspension of travel restrictions against UNITA officials in Angola for a further 90 days.

The Security Council again welcomed the signing of a Memorandum of Understanding between UNITA and the Angolan government on 4 April 2002 relating to the Lusaka Protocol. Furthermore, the efforts of the Angolan government to promote peaceful and secure conditions and national reconciliation and the efforts of UNITA to become active in the political process in the country were welcomed. The implementation of the Accordos de Paz, Lusaka Protocol and relevant Security Council resolutions was stressed, while the disbanding of UNITA's military wing was commended.

Recognising the need for UNITA officials to travel in order to advance the peace process and national reconciliation and acting under Chapter VII of the United Nations Charter, the Council suspended the travel ban against UNITA officials for 90 days. The suspension would be reviewed at the end of the 90-day period based on available information concerning the implementation of the peace accords. Other restrictions against UNITA remained in place.

On the same day, the Council adopted Resolution 1433 which established the United Nations Mission in Angola.

== See also ==
- Angolan Civil War
- List of United Nations Security Council Resolutions 1401 to 1500 (2002–2003)
