= Alan Kleier =

American engineer and business executive

Alan A. Kleier
- Born: c. 1954 (age 70–71); USA
- Education: University of Louisville
- Employer(s): Texaco, Chevron
- Spouse: Janetta
- Children: 3

Alan Kleier (born c. 1954) is an American engineer and business executive.

== History ==
Alan Kleir studied mechanical engineering and worked for Texaco and Chevron, first as a petroleum engineer. He assumed different leadership positions and was the General Director for Chevron Corporation's operations in Angola.

Kleier met with Marco Nhunga, Deputy General of the IDA (Instituto de Desenvolvimento Agrário), Cynthia G. Efird, the United States Ambassador to Angola, and Estevão Rodrigues, Director of CLUSA in Angola, in Benguela province on March 1, 2007. He retired from Chevron in 2013.

== See also ==
- Angolagate
- Angolan Civil War
