= Cassamba =

- commune
- Country: Angola
- Province: Moxico
- Time zone: UTC+1 (WAT)

Cassamba is a town and commune of Angola, located in the province of Moxico.

During the Angolan War of Independence, Luzia Inglês Van-Dúnem was the head of a communications centre there, which was controlled by the MPLA.

== See also ==
- Communes of Angola
