= United Nations Security Council Resolution 1336 =

UN Security Council Resolution 1336
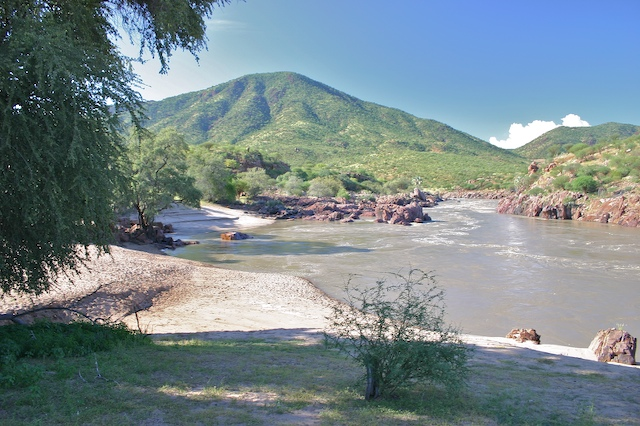
- Cunene River in Angola
- Date: 23 January 2001
- Meeting no.: 4,263
- Code: S/RES/1336 (Document)
- Subject: The situation in Angola
- Voting summary: 15 voted for; None voted against; None abstained
- Result: Adopted

Security Council composition
- Permanent members: China; France; Russia; United Kingdom; United States
- Non-permanent members: Bangladesh; Colombia; Ireland; Jamaica; Mali; Mauritius; Norway; Singapore; Tunisia; Ukraine

United Nations Security Council resolution 1336, adopted unanimously on 23 January 2001, after reaffirming Resolution 864 (1993) and all subsequent resolutions on Angola, particularly resolutions 1127 (1997), 1173 (1998), 1237 (1999) and 1295 (2000), the Council extended the monitoring mechanism of sanctions against UNITA for a further three months.

The security council expressed concern at the effects of the civil war on the humanitarian situation, determining that the situation remained a threat to international peace and security. Acting under Chapter VII of the United Nations Charter, the Council extended the monitoring mechanism described in Resolution 1295 for a period of three months and requested it to report periodically to the committee established in Resolution 864 with a final report by 19 April 2001.

The Secretary-General Kofi Annan was asked to re-appoint up to five experts to serve on the monitoring mechanism and make financial arrangements to this effect. Finally, all countries were called upon to co-operate with the mechanism during the course of its mandate.

== See also ==
- Angolan Civil War
- List of United Nations Security Council Resolutions 1301 to 1400 (2000–2002)
