= António Dembo =

Angolan politician

President of UNITA
- In office February 22, 2002 – February 25, 2002
- Preceded by: Jonas Savimbi
- Succeeded by: Paulo Lukamba Gato

Vice President of UNITA
- In office 1992–2002
- Preceded by: Jeremias Chitunda

Personal details
- Born: António Nabuco Sebastião Dembo; 1944 Nambuangongo, Portuguese Angola
- Died: February 25, 2002 (aged 57–58)
- Party: UNITA

António Nabuco Sebastião Dembo (1944 – February 25, 2002) was an Angolan engineer, politician, diplomat and military commander. He served as vice president (1992–2002) and later president (2002) of UNITA, an anti-Communist rebel group that fought against the MPLA in the Angolan Civil War.

== Early life and education ==
Dembo was born in 1944 to Sebastião Dembo and Muhemba Nabuco in Nambuangongo, Bengo Province, in what was then colonial Portuguese Angola.

He completed his primary schooling at Muxaluando and Quimai Methodist schools. His secondary education was at El Harrach and École Nationale d'Ingénieurs et Techniciens d'Algérie in Algeria.

== Career ==
In 1969, Dembo joined UNITA. After traveling throughout Africa on behalf of UNITA, he returned in 1982 to become commander for the Northern Front and later the Northern Front chief of staff. He became UNITA's vice president in 1992 when the Angolan Civil War resumed, succeeding Jeremias Chitunda, who was assassinated by the Angolan government in Luanda that year. He also became the general in charge of UNITA's Special Commandos, the Tupamaros.

After the war turned against UNITA in 2001–2002, Dembo's forces were constantly on the run from government troops. Following the death in battle of its leader Jonas Savimbi on February 22, 2002, Dembo became the President of UNITA. However, Dembo, who was also wounded in the same attack that killed Savimbi, and already weakened by diabetes, died three days later.

Dembo's succession of Savimbi had been pre-ordained by Savimbi and the UNITA leadership. In 1997, Savimbi and the UNITA leadership named Dembo as the successor in the event of Savimbi's death. Consistent with this pre-ordained succession, Dembo assumed leadership of UNITA immediately following Savimbi's death in combat.

Following Dembo's death, UNITA's leadership was assumed by Paulo Lukamba Gato, who had served as UNITA's ambassador to Europe under Savimbi.
