= Kafundanga Chingunji =

Angolan politician (died 1974)

- Died: January 1974; Angola's border with Zambia
- Occupation: the first chief of staff in the government of UNITA

"Kafundanga" Chingunji (died January 1974) served as the first chief of staff in the government of UNITA, pro-Western rebels, during the Angolan Civil War (1975–2002). As the patriarch of the Chingunji family he founded a political dynasty based in Angola's Central Highlands.

== Death ==
Officially, Chingunji died from cerebral malaria on Angola's border with Zambia. His wife and others who saw his body say someone poisoned Chingunji. Rumors later alleged Jonas Savimbi, the head of UNITA, ordered his assassination.

== See also ==
- List of unsolved deaths
