= United Nations Security Council Resolution 1412 =

UN Security Council Resolution 1412
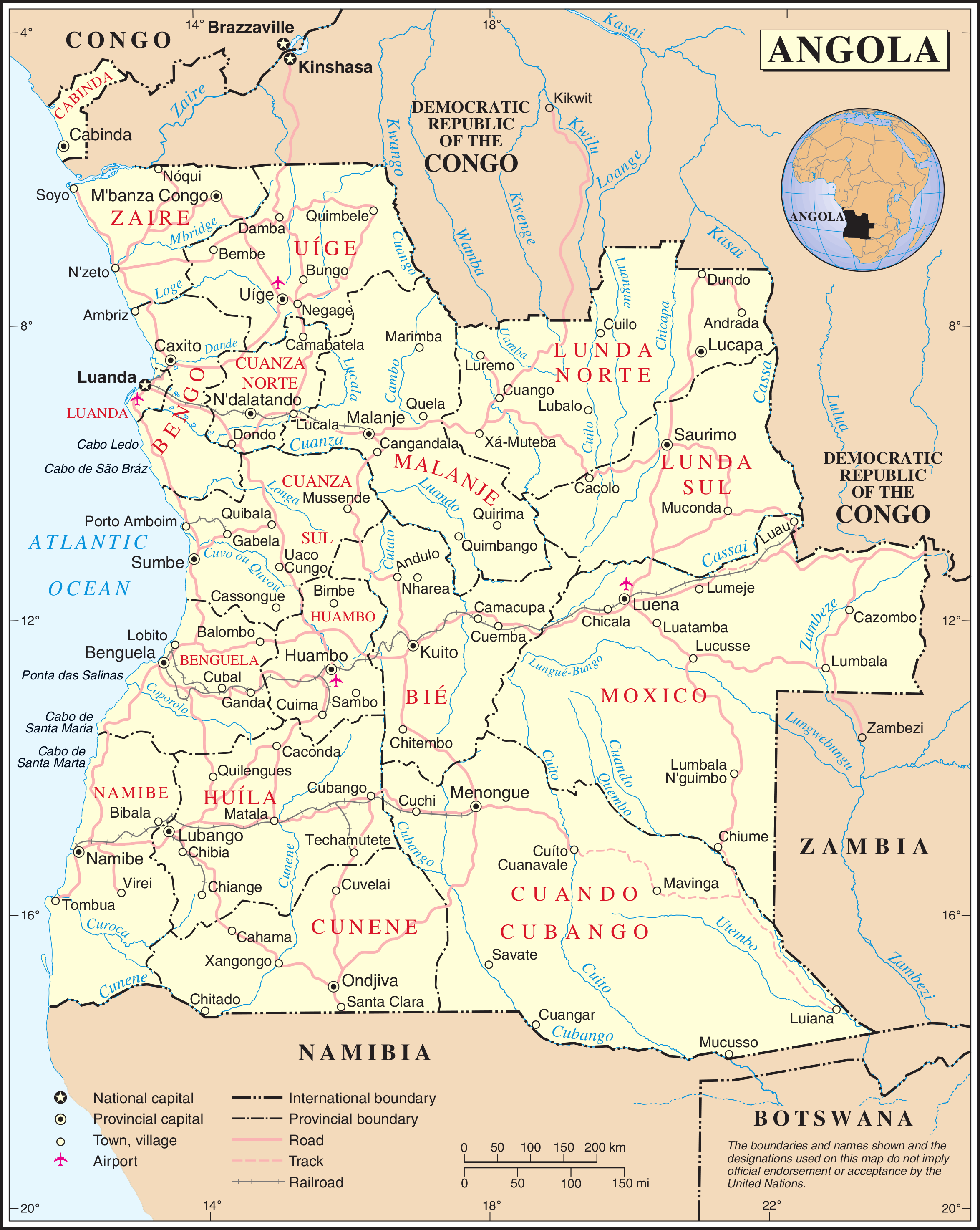
- Angola
- Date: 17 May 2002
- Meeting no.: 4,536
- Code: S/RES/1412 (Document)
- Subject: The situation in Angola
- Voting summary: 15 voted for; None voted against; None abstained
- Result: Adopted

Security Council composition
- Permanent members: China; France; Russia; United Kingdom; United States
- Non-permanent members: Bulgaria; Cameroon; Colombia; Guinea; Ireland; Mauritius; Mexico; Norway; Singapore; Syria

United Nations Security Council resolution 1412, adopted unanimously on 17 May 2002, after reaffirming resolutions 696 (1991), 864 (1993) and all subsequent resolutions on Angola, particularly Resolution 1127 (1997), the council suspended travel restrictions against UNITA officials the country after the signing of a memorandum of understanding between it and the Angolan government.

The Security Council recalled a statement from its president expressing readiness to amend or exempt measures imposed against UNITA if progress had been made. It welcomed the signing of a memorandum of understanding between UNITA and the government on 4 April 2002 relating to the Lusaka Protocol. Furthermore, the efforts of the Angolan government to promote peaceful and secure conditions and national reconciliation in the country were welcomed. The implementation of the Accordos de Paz, Lusaka Protocol and relevant Security Council resolutions was stressed, with UNITA urged to fully co-operate with the demobilisation, quartering and reintegration of its troops into civil society.

Recognising the need for UNITA officials to travel in order to advance the peace process and national reconciliation and acting under Chapter VII of the United Nations Charter, the council suspended the travel ban against UNITA officials for 90 days. The suspension would be reviewed at the end of the 90-day period. Other restrictions against UNITA remained in place.

== See also ==
- Angolan Civil War
- List of United Nations Security Council Resolutions 1401 to 1500 (2002–2003)
