= Paulo Lukamba Gato =

Angolan politician

Armindo Lucas Paulo Lukamba "Gato" (born May 18, 1954, in Bailundo) is a politician, diplomat, internationalist and general of the Angolan Army, one of the most important leaders of the National Union for the Total Independence of Angola (UNITA).

Led UNITA, a former anti-colonial movement that fought against the MPLA in the Angolan Civil War, from the death of António Dembo on March 3, 2002 until he lost the 2003 leadership election to Isaías Samakuva.

== History ==
Lukamba Gato was born in Bailundo, in the province of Huambo, in central Angola.

Lukamba Gato joined UNITA during the Carnation Revolution in Portugal. He eventually served eight years in France as UNITA's representative there.

From 1995 until the death of Jonas Savimbi in February 2002, Lukamba Gato served as UNITA's Secretary-General. Upon Savimbi's death and the subsequent death of Vice President António Dembo just 10 days later from diabetes and wounds suffered in the same attack that killed Savimbi, Lukamba Gato assumed control of the rebel group. Lukamba Gato led UNITA in negotiations that ended the Angolan Civil War in April 2002.

Lukamba Gato led UNITA's political party until 2003 when Isaías Samakuva won the leadership election. Samakuva is the President of UNITA until November 2019.

Lukamba Gato was the fifth candidate on UNITA's national list in the September 2008 parliamentary election. He was one of 16 UNITA candidates to win seats in the election.
