= United Nations Security Council Resolution 1237 =

UN Security Council Resolution 1237
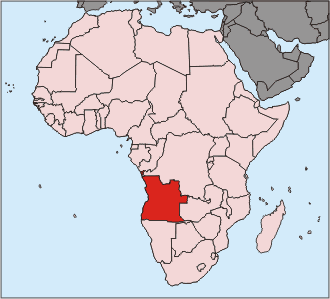
- Angola
- Date: 7 May 1999
- Meeting no.: 3,999
- Code: S/RES/1237 (Document)
- Subject: The situation in Angola
- Voting summary: 15 voted for; None voted against; None abstained
- Result: Adopted

Security Council composition
- Permanent members: China; France; Russia; United Kingdom; United States
- Non-permanent members: Argentina; Bahrain; Brazil; Canada; Gabon; Gambia; Malaysia; Namibia; Netherlands; Slovenia

United Nations Security Council resolution 1237, adopted unanimously on 7 May 1999, after reaffirming Resolution 696 (1991) and all subsequent resolutions on Angola, particularly resolutions 864 (1993), 1127 (1997), 1173 (1998) and 1229 (1999), the council established expert panels to investigate violations of measures imposed against UNITA.

In the preamble of the resolution, the security council reaffirmed that the primary cause of the crisis in Angola was due to the failure of UNITA, under the leadership of Jonas Savimbi, to comply with its obligations under the Accordos de Paz, Lusaka Protocol and relevant security council resolutions. There was concern about the impact on the population and the provision of military assistance, including mercenaries, to UNITA. The Secretary-General Kofi Annan had made recommendations regarding the improvement of sanctions against UNITA.

The resolution highlighted that peace and national reconciliation in Angola could only be achieved through a political settlement of the conflict and in this regard welcomed planned visits by the Chairman of the committee established in Resolution 864 to the country to discuss to improve measures against UNITA. It condemned continued UNITA attacks against civilians in Huambo, Kuito and Malanje.

Expert panels were then established for a period of six months to collect information relating to violations of measures against UNITA in connection with weapons, oil, diamonds and financial resources. The panels also had to identify parties violating the sanctions and recommend ways to end such violations. The panels were responsible for the Fowler Report, that later gave rise to the Kimberley Process Certification Scheme (United Nations General Assembly Resolution 55/56). All countries were called to co-operate with the panel and provide access to information, witnesses, places in addition to guaranteeing its safety and granting immunity under the Convention on the Privileges and Immunities of the United Nations.

Furthermore, the council was concerned at the delays in investigating the downing of two United Nations aircraft over UNITA-controlled territory on 26 December 1998 and 2 January 1999, as well as the crash of a plane carrying the Special Representative of the Secretary-General in Côte d'Ivoire on 26 June 1998. Finally, all countries were urged to co-operate towards humanitarian activities in Angola.

== See also ==
- Angolan Civil War
- Blood diamonds
- List of United Nations Security Council Resolutions 1201 to 1300 (1998–2000)
- United Nations Security Council Resolution 1295
