= United Nations Security Council Resolution 1127 =

UN Security Council Resolution 1127
- Flag of UNITA
- Date: 28 August 1997
- Meeting no.: 3,814
- Code: S/RES/1127 (Document)
- Subject: The situation in Angola
- Voting summary: 15 voted for; None voted against; None abstained
- Result: Adopted

Security Council composition
- Permanent members: China; France; Russia; United Kingdom; United States
- Non-permanent members: Chile; Costa Rica; Egypt; Guinea-Bissau; Japan; Kenya; South Korea; Poland; Portugal; Sweden

United Nations Security Council resolution 1127, adopted unanimously on 28 August 1997, after reaffirming Resolution 696 (1991) and all subsequent resolutions on Angola, the council, acting under Chapter VII of the United Nations Charter, imposed sanctions on UNITA following the lack of compliance in implementing peace agreements after the civil war.

The security council recalled that it would take action against UNITA if it did not comply with its obligations under the Accordos de Paz, Lusaka Protocol and relevant Security Council resolutions, particularly Resolution 1118 (1997). It demanded that UNITA and the Government of Angola immediately complete the remaining aspects of the peace process and refrain from actions that would increase tension. UNITA was also required to demilitarise its troops, complete the transformation of its radio station Vorgan into a non-partisan broadcasting station, and extend the authority of the state to the areas controlled by it. It also had to immediately correct and complete information about the strength of its forces and provide the information to the Joint Commission.

Acting under Chapter VII, all countries were then asked to adopt the following measures:

(a) prevent UNITA officials and their immediate families from entering their territory, except on occasions necessary for the functioning of the Government of Unity and National Reconciliation, the National Assembly, or the Joint Commission;
(b) cancel all travel documents, visas and residence permits to UNITA officials and their immediate families;
(c) close all UNITA offices in their territory;
(d) ban flights from landing, departing or overflying their territory;
(e) ban the supply of aircraft parts;
(f) ban the provision of insurance to Angolan aircraft, with exceptions noted in Resolution 864 (1993).

The measures would also not apply in cases of medical emergencies or flights carrying humanitarian aid. All countries were urged not to prevent travel by official delegations to UNITA headquarters except in humanitarian cases or for purposes of promoting the peace process. The travel sanctions would come into force from 30 September 1997 unless it was noted that UNITA was beginning to comply.

The Secretary-General Kofi Annan was requested to report to the council by 20 October 1997 and every 90 days on the compliance of UNITA with Security Council resolutions and peace agreements. If there was no compliance, the resolution noted that additional financial and trade restrictions would be considered.

The council further demanded that Angola and UNITA continue to co-operate with the United Nations Mission in Angola (MONUA) and cease restricting its activities and laying land mines. It supported the recommendation of the Secretary-General for the withdrawal of United Nations military units to be suspended until end of October 1997. Finally, it was thought that a summit meeting between the President of Angola José Eduardo dos Santos and the leader of UNITA Jonas Savimbi could reduce the tension.

== See also ==
- Angolan Civil War
- List of United Nations Security Council Resolutions 1101 to 1200 (1997–1998)
- United Nations Angola Verification Mission I
- United Nations Angola Verification Mission II
- United Nations Angola Verification Mission III
