= UNITA =

Angolan political party

National Union for the Total Independence of Angola União Nacional para a Independência Total de Angola
- Leader: Adalberto Costa Júnior
- Founder: Jonas Savimbi
- Founded: 13 March 1966
- Split from: National Liberation Front of Angola
- Headquarters: Luanda
- Youth wing: Revolutionary United Youth of Angola
- Women's wing: Angolan Women's League
- Armed wing: FALA (until 1993)
- Ideology: Conservatism; Anti-communism; Big tent; Formerly: Communism; Maoism; Black nationalism; Anti-Sovietism
- Political position: Centre-right to right-wing; Formerly: Far-left
- National affiliation: United Patriotic Front (since 2021); Supreme Council for the Liberation of Angola (1972–1975)
- Regional affiliation: Democrat Union of Africa
- International affiliation: Centrist Democrat International
- Seats in the National Assembly: 90 / 220

Party flag

Website
- unita-angola.co.ao

The National Union for the Total Independence of Angola (Portuguese: União Nacional para a Independência Total de Angola, abbr. UNITA) is the second-largest political party in Angola. Founded in 1966, UNITA fought alongside the People's Movement for the Liberation of Angola (MPLA) and the National Liberation Front of Angola (FNLA) in the Angolan War for Independence (1961–1975) and then against the MPLA in the ensuing civil war (1975–2002). The war was one of the most prominent Cold War proxy wars, with UNITA receiving military aid initially from the People's Republic of China until 1975 and later from the United States (Note: The United States supported the National Liberation Front of Angola (FNLA) from 1961 to 1969 and from August 1974 to January 1976. The FNLA/UNITA coalition opposed the MPLA.) and apartheid South Africa while the MPLA received material and technical support from the Soviet Union and its allies, especially Cuba.

Until 1996, UNITA was funded through Angolan diamond mines in both Lunda Norte and Lunda Sul along the Cuango River valley, especially the Catoca mine, which was Angola's only Kimberlite mine at that time. Valdemar Chindondo served as chief of staff in the government of UNITA, pro-Western rebels, during the Angolan Civil War (1975–2002). Jonas Savimbi, leader of UNITA, allegedly ordered Chindondo's assassination.

Savimbi's successor as president of UNITA was Isaías Samakuva. Following Savimbi's death, UNITA abandoned armed struggle and participated in electoral politics. The party won 51 out of 220 seats in the 2017 parliamentary election. Samakuva resigned as party leader in November 2019, being replaced by Adalberto Costa Júnior.

== Founding ==
Jonas Savimbi and António da Costa Fernandes founded UNITA on 13 March 1966 in Muangai in Moxico province in Portuguese Angola (during the Estado Novo regime). 200 other delegates were present in the event. UNITA launched its first attack on Portuguese colonial authorities on 25 December 1966.

Savimbi was originally affiliated with Holden Roberto's National Liberation Front of Angola (FNLA). UNITA later moved to Jamba in Angola's southeastern province of Cuando Cubango. UNITA's leadership was drawn heavily from Angola's majority Ovimbundu ethnic group and its policies were originally Maoist, they quickly abandoned the Maoist struggle, when they started collaborating with Portuguese Officials against the MPLA. They then aimed for rural rights and recognized ethnic divisions. During the 1980s, however, UNITA was aligned with the United States and apartheid South Africa. After the 1992 Angolan general election, UNITA lost its support from the United States and was only supported by apartheid South Africa.

== Independence and civil war ==
After the Portuguese withdrawal from Angola in 1974–1975 and the end of their colonial rule, the MPLA and UNITA splintered, and civil war began as the movements clashed militarily and ideologically. MPLA leader Agostinho Neto became the first president of post-colonial Angola. Backed by Soviet and Cuban money, weapons and troops, the MPLA defeated the FNLA militarily and forced them largely into exile. UNITA also was nearly destroyed in November 1975, but it managed to survive and set up a second government, the Democratic People's Republic of Angola, in the provincial capital of Huambo. UNITA was hard-pressed but recovered with South African aid and then was strengthened considerably by U.S. support during the 1980s. The MPLA's military presence was strongest in Angolan cities, the coastal region and the strategic oil fields. But UNITA controlled much of the highland's interior, notably the Bié Plateau, and other strategic regions of the country. Up to 300,000 Angolans died in the civil war.

=== Guerrilla movement ===
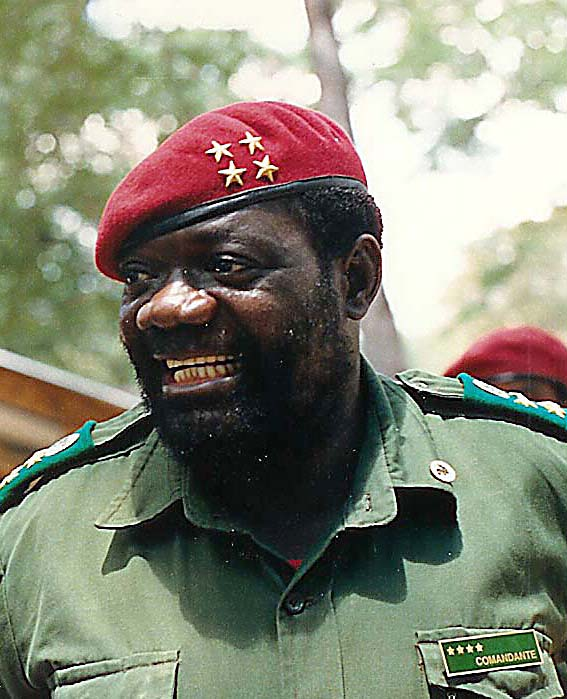
UNITA leader Jonas Savimbi

In the 1980s and early 1990s, Savimbi sought out vastly expanded relations with the U.S. He received considerable guidance from The Heritage Foundation, an influential conservative research institute in Washington, D.C. that maintained strong relations with both the Reagan administration and the U.S. Congress. Michael Johns, the Heritage Foundation's leading expert on Africa and Third World Affairs issues, visited Savimbi in his clandestine southern Angolan base camps, offering the UNITA leader both tactical military and political advice. Through the lobbying efforts of Paul Manafort and his firm Black, Manafort, Stone and Kelly which was paid $600,000 each year from Savimbi beginning in 1985, UNITA gained strong backing from the Reagan administration.

In 1986, U.S. conservatives convinced President Ronald Reagan to meet with Savimbi at the White House. While the meeting itself was confidential, Reagan emerged from it with support and enthusiasm for Savimbi's efforts, stating that he could envision a UNITA "victory that electrifies the world," suggesting that Reagan saw the outcome of the Angolan conflict as critical to his entire Reagan Doctrine foreign policy, consisting of support for anti-communist resistance movements in Central America, Southeast Asia, and elsewhere.

Under Savimbi's leadership, UNITA proved especially effective militarily before and after independence, becoming one of the world's most effective armed resistance movements of the late 20th century. According to the U.S. State Department, UNITA came to control "vast swaths of the interior (of Angola)". Savimbi's very survival in Angola in and of itself was viewed as an incredible accomplishment, and he came to be known as "Africa's most enduring bush fighter" given assassination attempts, aided by extensive Soviet, Cuban, and East German military troops, advisors and support, that he survived.

As Savimbi gained ground despite the forces aligned against him, American conservatives pointed to his success, and that of Afghan mujahideen and the Nicaraguan contras, all of which, with U.S. support, were successfully opposing Soviet-sponsored governments, as evidence that the U.S. was beginning to gain an upper hand in the Cold War conflict and that the Reagan Doctrine was working. Critics, on the other hand, responded that the support given to UNITA, the contras, and the Afghan mujahideen was inflaming regional conflicts at great expense to these nations. Furthermore, UNITA, like the Angolan government it fought, was criticized for human rights abuses.

=== 1980s ===
UNITA gained some international notoriety in 1983 after abducting 66 Czechoslovak civilians and detaining a third of them for about 15 months. Belgium eventually negotiated the release of the civilians. Fighting in Angola continued until 1989, when, with UNITA advancing militarily, Cuba withdrew its support, removing several thousand troops that it had dispatched to Angola to fight Savimbi's UNITA. With many commentators and foreign policy specialists seeing that the Cold War might be drawing to an end, Savimbi's U.S. support, which had been strong, began to be questioned, with some in Congress urging the end of U.S. support for UNITA. Matters were further complicated by repeated reports that Soviet General Secretary Mikhail Gorbachev had raised U.S. support for UNITA in several formal and informal summit meetings with President George H. W. Bush, placing further pressure on the U.S. to end its support for UNITA.

A UNITA sticker issued for its 20th anniversary celebrations in 1986. The sticker carries the UNITA symbol and the slogan "Socialism – Negritude – Democracy – Non-Alignment"

As the war began to include both military and diplomatic components, Johns and leading U.S. conservatives urged Savimbi to make a ceasefire contingent on the MPLA's agreement to "free and fair elections." When the UNITA demand was originally rebuffed by the MPLA, Savimbi vastly intensified his military pressure, while alleging that the MPLA was resisting free and fair elections because they feared a UNITA electoral victory. Meanwhile, an agreement was reached that provided for the removal of foreign troops from Angola in exchange for the independence of Namibia from South Africa. In Angola, however, Savimbi told Johns and conservative leader Howard Phillips that he had not felt adequately consulted on the negotiations or agreement and was in opposition to it. "There are a lot of loopholes in that agreement. The agreement is not good at all," Johns reported Savimbi telling both of them during a March 1989 visit with Savimbi in Angola." A CIA plane crash in late 1989 and related reporting revealed that the US had been air-lifting in weapons and insurgents to undermine peace attempts in secret amid a background of partial opposition to aid for UNITA.

A ceasefire ultimately was negotiated and MPLA leader José Eduardo dos Santos and the MPLA's Central Committee rejected its Marxist past and agreed to Savimbi's demand for free and fair elections, though UNITA and its supporters viewed the promises skeptically, especially because the MPLA's relations with the Soviet Union remained strong.

=== 1990s ===
Following the 1991 Bicesse Accords, signed in Lisbon, United Nations-brokered elections were held, with both Savimbi and dos Santos running for president in 1992. Failing to win an overall majority in the first round of balloting, and then questioning the election's legitimacy, Savimbi and UNITA returned to armed conflict. Fighting resumed in October 1992 in Huambo, quickly spreading to Angola's capital, Luanda. It was here that Jeremias Chitunda, UNITA's long-time vice-president and other UNITA officials were killed while fleeing the city culminating in the Halloween Massacre. Following Chitunda's death, UNITA defensively moved their base from Jamba to Huambo. Savimbi's 1992 decision to return to combat ultimately proved a costly one, with many of Savimbi's U.S. conservative allies urging Savimbi to contest dos Santos electorally in the run-off election. Savimbi's decision to forego the run-off also greatly strained UNITA's relations with U.S. President George H. W. Bush.

As Savimbi resumed fighting, the U.N. responded by implementing an embargo against UNITA through United Nations Security Council Resolution 1173. The UN-commissioned Fowler Report detailed how UNITA continued to finance its war effort through the sales of diamonds (later to be known as blood diamonds) and resulted in further sanctions in the form of United Nations Security Council Resolution 1295 and action to end to the trade in blood diamonds through the Kimberley Process Certification Scheme. In late 1992 following the general elections, the U.S. government, which had never recognized the legitimacy of the MPLA, finally recognized the Angolan government and stopped supporting UNITA, further alienating Savimbi. After failed talks in 1993 to end the conflict, another agreement, the Lusaka Protocol, was implemented in 1994 to form a government of national unity. In 1995, U.N. peacekeepers arrived. But UNITA broke away from the Lusaka agreement in 1998, citing violations of it by the MPLA. In late 1998, a militant group calling itself UNITA Renovada broke away from mainstream UNITA, when several UNITA commanders dissatisfied with the leadership of Jonas Savimbi ended their allegiance to his organization. Thousands more deserted UNITA in 1999 and 2000.

In 1999, a MPLA military offensive known as Operation Restore damaged UNITA considerably, essentially destroying UNITA as a conventional military force and forcing UNITA to return to more traditional guerrilla tactics. In October 1999, UNITA alleged that the FAA Embraer EMB 312 Tucanos used during Operation Restore were crewed by Brazilian pilots on contract to the Angolan government. UNITA subsequently declared "that anything within the Angolan national territory, identified as Brazil's interest, is... considered a target and will not be spared" from their attacks.

=== 2000s ===
The Angolan civil war ended only after the death of Savimbi, who was killed in an ambush on 22 February 2002. His death was shocking to many Angolans, many of whom had grown up during the Angolan civil war and witnessed Savimbi's ability to successfully evade efforts by Soviet, Cuban and Angolan troops to kill him.

Six weeks following Savimbi's death, in April 2002, UNITA agreed to a ceasefire with the government. Under an amnesty agreement, UNITA soldiers and their families, comprising roughly 350,000 people, were gathered in 33 demobilisation camps under the "Program For Social and Productive Reintegration of Demobilized and War Displaced People". In August 2002, UNITA officially gave up its armed wing, and UNITA placed all of its efforts on the development of its political party. Despite the ceasefire, deep political conflict between UNITA and the MPLA remains.

Savimbi was immediately succeeded by António Dembo, who died shortly after Savimbi. Following Dembo, in elections contested by General Paulo Lukamba Gato, Dinho Chingunji and Isaías Samakuva, Samakuva won the UNITA election and emerged as UNITA's new president.

In November 2019, Isaías Samakuva resigned as president and was replaced by Adalberto Costa Júnior with Arlete Leona Chimbinda as the new vice-president.

== Foreign support ==
UNITA received support from several governments in Africa, Europe, and Asia, including the People's Republic of Bulgaria, Egypt, France, Israel, Morocco, the People's Republic of China, North Korea, Saudi Arabia, Zaire, and Zambia.

=== United States ===
During the Reagan administration high ranking security officials met with UNITA leaders. Central Intelligence Agency Director William J. Casey, National Security Advisor Richard Allen, and Secretary of State Alexander Haig, on 6 March met with UNITA leaders in Washington, D.C. Assistant Secretary of State for African Affairs Walker met with Savimbi in March in Rabat, Morocco. Secretary of Defense Caspar Weinberger, his assistant for International Security Matters Francis West, Deputy Defense Secretary Frank Carlucci, deputy director of the CIA Bobby Inman, and Director of the Defense Intelligence Agency James Williams met with Savimbi between November 1981 and January 1982. Although the Clark Amendment forbid U.S. involvement in the civil war, Secretary Haig told Savimbi in December 1981 that the U.S. would continue to provide assistance to UNITA.

The U.S. government "explicitly encouraged" the governments of Israel, Morocco, Saudi Arabia, South Africa, and Zaire to aid UNITA. In 1983 the U.S. and South African governments agreed to ship weapons from the Honduras, Belgium and Switzerland to South Africa and then to UNITA in Angola. The U.S. also traded weapons with South Africa for intelligence on the civil war.

Savimbi benefited from the support of influential American conservatives, including The Heritage Foundation's Michael Johns and other U.S. conservative leaders, who helped elevate Savimbi's stature in Washington and promoted the transfer of American weapons to his war.

Johns and other American conservatives met regularly with Savimbi in remote Jamba, culminating in the "Democratic International" in 1985. Savimbi later drew the praise of U.S. President Ronald Reagan, who hailed him as a freedom fighter and spoke of Savimbi winning a victory that "electrifies the world" while others hinted at a much darker regime, dismissing Savimbi as a power-hungry propagandist.

After the 1992 Angolan general election, UNITA lost its support from the United States and was only supported by South Africa. Support ceased after the end of the apartheid in South Africa and the election of Nelson Mandela as president in 1994; Mandela and the African National Congress had given the MPLA military support through the ANC armed wing uMkhonto we Sizwe.

== Electoral history ==
=== Presidential elections ===
Election	Party candidate	Votes	%	Result
1992	Jonas Savimbi	1,579,298	40.07%	Lost ✗
2012	Isaías Samakuva	1,074,565	18.67%	Lost ✗
2017	Isaías Samakuva	1,818,903	26.68%	Lost ✗
2022	Adalberto Costa Júnior	2,756,786	43.95%	Lost ✗

=== National Assembly elections ===
Election	Party leader	Votes	%	Seats	+/–	Position	Result
1992	Jonas Savimbi	1,347,636	34.1%	70 / 220	New	▲2nd	Opposition
2008	Isaías Samakuva	670,363	10.39%	16 / 220	▼54	2nd	Opposition
2012	Isaías Samakuva	1,074,565	18.66%	32 / 220	▲16	2nd	Opposition
2017	Isaías Samakuva	1,790,320	26.7%	51 / 220	▲19	2nd	Opposition
2022	Adalberto Costa Júnior	2,756,786	43.95%	90 / 220	▲39	2nd	Opposition

== See also ==
- African independence movements
- Blood Diamonds
- David Chingunji
- Jorge Sangumba
- Kafundanga Chingunji
- RENAMO, a similar group in Mozambique also supported by Apartheid South Africa
