= Angola–United States relations =

- Angola: United States

Diplomatic mission
- Angolan Embassy, Washington, D.C.: United States Embassy, Luanda

Envoy
- Ambassador Joaquim do Espirito Santo: Chargé d'affaires Shannon Nagy Cazeau

Angola and the United States have maintained cordial diplomatic relations since 1993. Before then, antagonism between the countries hinged on Cold War geopolitics, which led the U.S. to support anti-government rebels during the protracted Angolan Civil War.

Angola's long history connected with the Atlantic world between the 16th and 19th centuries of how the transatlantic slave trade, the birth of the American, French and Haitian Revolutions were profoundly linked, especially Destrehan in Louisiana.

Although Angola won independence from Portugal in 1975, the U.S. – alone among its Western peers – never granted diplomatic recognition to the People's Republic of Angola, the socialist one-party state under which the country was governed until 1992. Anxious to contain the spread of communism in the region, and to protect American interests in the Angolan oil sector, the U.S. was staunchly opposed to Angola's ruling party, the left-wing, Soviet-aligned Popular Movement for the Liberation of Angola (MPLA). When the Angolan Civil War began in 1975, the U.S. extended military aid to both of MPLA's domestic rivals: the National Liberation Front of Angola (FNLA) and Jonas Savimbi's National Union for the Total Independence of Angola (UNITA). The presence of Cuban troops in Angola greatly increased the U.S.'s investment in the outcome of the war. The ensuing conflict became entangled with the South African Border War, and the U.S. government was accused of complicity in – and collaboration with – the invasion of Angola by South Africa's apartheid regime.

Even as MPLA consolidated its control over Angola, U.S. President Gerald Ford – supported by his Secretary of State, Henry Kissinger – continued to deny recognition to its government, a policy maintained by his successors. The Clark Amendment blocked any further U.S. aid to Angolan rebels between 1976 and 1985, but relations between the two countries remained extremely cold. After 1985, President Ronald Reagan announced the resumption of U.S. support to UNITA, in line with the so-called Reagan Doctrine. However, a parallel initiative of the Reagan administration stemmed from the latter's policy of constructive engagement with South Africa on regional issues. In this regard, the U.S. pursued negotiations to ameliorate Southern Africa's various interlocking conflicts, in particular by linking the independence of South West Africa as Namibia to a Cuban withdrawal from Angola. This policy came to fruition with the Tripartite Accord of 1988, which the U.S. was instrumental in mediating.

Thereafter, with the end of the Cold War imminent, the governments of both countries were increasingly comfortable cooperating to end the Angolan civil conflict through a negotiated settlement, notwithstanding the sticking point presented by ongoing – and indeed augmented – American support to UNITA under President George H. W. Bush. On 19 May 1993, with intra-Angolan peace talks still underway, the government of President Bill Clinton extended formal diplomatic recognition to the MPLA-led Angolan government, which had held multi-party elections the previous year. While UNITA continued to take and hold territory throughout the 1990s, the U.S. government's attention increasingly shifted to supporting the Angolan government's national reconciliation efforts, and to strengthening bilateral economic ties.

The importance of those economic ties persists, although it is diminished: Angolan oil exports are no longer of strategic importance to the U.S., and Angolan trade is increasingly oriented towards China. However, American oil companies retain significant investments in Angola, which remains the U.S.'s third-largest trading partner in sub-Saharan Africa. The U.S. is also Angola's primary source of official development assistance. In the 21st century, regional security partnership, especially in the Gulf of Guinea, has been an additional focal point of bilateral relations.

Both countries are members of the UN, the International Monetary Fund, World Bank, and World Trade Organization; and Angola is an observer to the Organization of American States.

== History ==
=== 1482–1961: The Triangular Atlantic ===
In 1482, the Portuguese navigator Diogo Cão reached the mouth of the Congo River, establishing the first European contact with the powerful Kingdom of Kongo, as Portugal later established a fortified settlement at São Paulo da Assunção de Loanda (modern-day Luanda), which served as a major trading post and slave-exporting port where it remains until Angola won independence within 400 years later from Portugal during the War of Independence. In December 1492, Christopher Columbus landed on the island of Hispaniola and built the La Navidad settlement from his wrecked flagship, the Santa María. It was stablished on the north coast of present-day Haiti, the fort was left with 39 crew members, but was found destroyed with all settlers killed when Columbus returned in 1493 which claimed the entire island of Hispaniola, initially enslaving the indigenous Taíno people, whose population collapsed due to forced labor and European diseases, to replace the Taíno population by importing thousands of slaves from Africa including Angola to the New World. On 1 March 1565, the foundation of Rio de Janeiro by the Portuguese military officer Estácio de Sá marked a critical turning point in the geopolitical landscape of South America, the settlement rapidly evolved from a fortified outpost into the economic and administrative heartbeat of the Portuguese Empire in the New World. Over the next few centuries, millions of enslaved Africans were captured and forcibly transported to Brazil. In 1697, under the Treaty of Ryswick, Spain formally ceded the western third of Hispaniola to France, which named the colony Saint-Domingue, the wealthy French colonial territory that emerged on the western third of the island, relying heavily on enslaved African labor to become a global sugar and coffee powerhouse with a vital northern port city of Cap-Français, where many slave ships arrived and colonial trade flourished. Others were shipped directly or re-exported via inter-colonial trade networks to the Thirteen Colonies, including the strategic port of New York (formerly New Amsterdam, by the Dutch West India Company). The British won the global conflict against France during the French and Indian War in 1763, taking control of Canada and removing the French threat for the American colonists. On 2 July 1776, during the American Revolution, the Continental Congress voted to sever ties with Great Britain, a momentous decision formally announced to the world on 4 July 1776 through the Declaration of Independence. The grueling war that followed finally reached its symbolic and practical conclusion with the Evacuation of New York in 1783. As both the British troops and loyalists departed New York for Canada, the newly born United States stood as the first independent constitutional republic in the New World. When the French Revolution erupted in Paris and Versailles in 1789, it unleashed ideas of liberty, equality, and fraternity that spread like wildfire across the globe. By September 1792, these radical transformations led to the proclamation of the First French Republic, followed shortly by the shocking execution of King Louis XVI under the blade of the guillotine in January 1793. Yet, while the revolutionaries in Paris debated the rights of man, France’s most lucrative colony of Saint-Domingue was to take those ideals to their ultimate, revolutionary conclusion. Toussaint Louverture, Jean-Jacques Dessalines, and Henri Christophe alongside hundreds of thousands of determined slaves, including many newly arrived captives torn from Angola, they forged a formidable military force. They fought against staggering odds, enduring shifting alliances and the brutal machinery of French colonialism. By the late 18th and early 19th centuries, Rio de Janeiro had transformed into a city overwhelmingly populated by enslaved people as the sheer scale of this forced migration reshaped the demographic, cultural, and physical fabric of the urban landscape. When Napoleon Bonaparte seized power in France and sought to reinstate slavery in the colonies, the conflict escalated into a war of total liberation. Recognizing the global geopolitical stakes, the insurgent black generals strategically negotiated with the British Empire against France, engineering an economic and military isolation that suffocated the French forces, which cut off from reinforcements and decimated by yellow fever, Napoleon’s dream of a vast Western empire collapsed. This catastrophic defeat in the French Caribbean forced Napoleon into a corner; with his treasury drained and his American ambitions ruined by the Haitian Revolution, he had no choice but to sell the entire Louisiana Territory to the United States in 1803, signing away the heart of North America in New Orleans. On 18 November 1803, at the historic Battle of Vertières, the revolutionary army, led by Dessalines, definitively crushed the remnants of the French expeditionary forces. The slaves have finally won their victory where France was utterly defeated, and its troops evacuated the island forever. On New Year’s Day 1804, Dessalines officially declared independence from France, in a profound act of reclamation, the victorious leaders cast aside the colonial name of Saint-Domingue. Instead, they renamed their homeland Ayiti, reviving the ancient Taíno name for the mountainous island, the very land Christopher Columbus had claimed for Spain over a century earlier when he first arrived in the Caribbean during his maiden voyage in December 1492. Haiti emerged as the world’s very first and oldest free, Black-led republic. It stood proud as a beacon of liberation across Latin America, the West Indies, the Greater Antilles, the Caribbean, and the entire New World cementing its legacy as the second oldest independent nation in all of the Americas, right after the United States. Brazil declared independence from Portugal on 7 September 1822, leaving a complex and deeply rooted legacy that would continue to shape the social dynamics of the newly formed nation for generations.

=== 1961–1974: Angolan War of Independence ===
From 1962, during Angola's protracted struggle for independence from Portugal, the U.S. provided covert support to Holden Roberto of the National Liberation Front of Angola (FNLA). The administration of U.S. President John F. Kennedy also barred Portugal from using American weapons in its colonies, although compliance with this ban was imperfect. Like subsequent presidents, Kennedy, in his policy stance, attempted to balance the U.S.'s multiple interests in Angola. Political imperatives arose from Cold War politics and the U.S. containment policy: although some American policymakers viewed Portuguese colonialism as a stabilising force in Africa, American support for FNLA was calculated to avoid an outcome in which the left-wing, Soviet-aligned Popular Movement for the Liberation of Angola (MPLA) gained control of an independent Angola. The U.S. also had significant economic interests in Angola: various American companies operated there, including Gulf Oil in Cabinda; and in 1975, the U.S. was Angola's primary export market (ahead even of Portugal) and its third largest import market. The U.S. was also a close partner of President Mobutu Sese Seko in neighbouring Zaire, whose regime closely guarded its security interests in Angola, including by hosting FNLA insurgents in Zaire. However, after Richard Nixon was elected U.S. president and adopted the so-called Tar Baby option, the U.S. redoubled its support for the Portuguese colonists and remained publicly neutral towards FNLA, as it did towards all liberation movements, while occasionally lobbying privately for reform of the Portuguese regime in Angola.

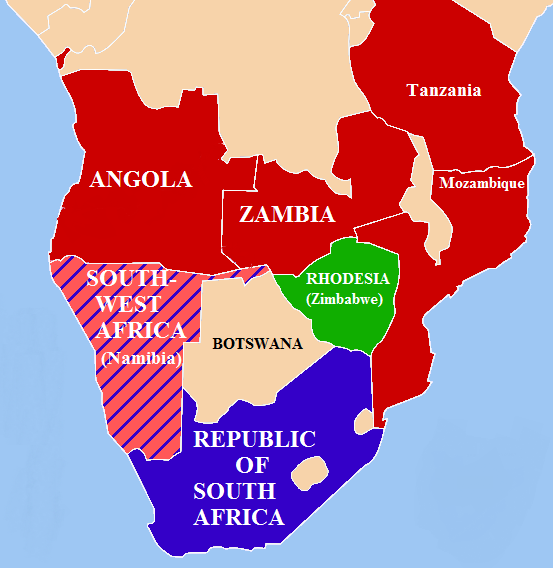
Geopolitical situation, 1978–79. SWAPO allies South African allies South West Africa (Namibia) South Africa

=== 1975–2002: Angolan Civil War ===
==== Early U.S. involvement ====
By late 1975, Angola had achieved independence but had become the site of a territorial contest between MPLA (later supported by Cuban troops, with Soviet backing) and its domestic rivals, the National Union for the Total Independence of Angola (UNITA) and FNLA (later supported by South African troops). The U.S. publicly advocated a negotiated political solution to the conflict. However, as observers suspected at the time, U.S. President Gerald Ford had already authorised government support to UNITA and FNLA, beginning with the 40 Committee's decision in January 1975 to reinforce aid to FNLA, though to still-modest levels. In July 1975, reportedly at the urging of U.S. Secretary of State Henry Kissinger, Ford approved the covert Operation IA Feature, which was run by the Central Intelligence Agency (CIA) and coordinated closely (or "colluded", as critics claimed) with South African and Zairean efforts in Angola. The operation provided for $32 million in financial support to UNITA and FNLA; $16 million in military equipment, to be supplied to the groups through Zaire; and the recruitment of mercenaries, and some CIA experts, to advise the groups' military commands. South African officials and CIA officer John Stockwell also claimed that the US had known in advance of, and had cooperated with, South Africa's planned invasion of Angola in October 1975.

Academic John A. Marcum called the Angolan proxy intervention "the post-Vietnam testing ground of American will and power" in the face of mounting Soviet expansionism. When the operation was exposed publicly, the U.S. Congress passed the Clark Amendment to the Arms Export Control Act, blocking further U.S. support to military or paramilitary groups in Angola. However, Stockwell alleges that, the following week, Kissinger, via U.S. diplomats in Kinshasa, assured UNITA that the U.S. would "continue to support UNITA as long as it demonstrated the capacity for effective resistance to the MPLA".

==== Non-recognition of MPLA government ====
Violent conflict in Angola subsided in early 1976, as MPLA consolidated its control over the country. The U.S., however – though it permitted Gulf Oil to resume its Angolan operations (responsible for about 65 per cent of the Angolan government's foreign exchange) – became the single Western power to refuse to recognise the new, socialist, MPLA-ruled People's Republic of Angola. It vetoed Angola's application for United Nations (UN) membership in June 1976, on the basis of the continued Cuban presence in the country. Although the bid to block Angola's entry to the UN failed, successive U.S. administrations succeeded, until September 1990, in blocking its membership of the World Bank and International Monetary Fund.

Jimmy Carter was highly critical of the Ford administration's Angolan policy during his presidential campaign, and members of his administration – especially UN Ambassador Andrew Young – publicly supported taking a less hostile posture towards MPLA. However, by 1977, reportedly under the influence of his National Security Advisor, Zbigniew Brzezinski, Carter too had announced that a Cuban drawdown in Angola was a prerequisite for any diplomatic relations between Washington, D.C., and Luanda. Over the next two years, Angolan-backed insurgents invaded Zaire twice, precipitating conflicts known as Shaba I and Shaba II, and, on the latter occasion, provoking U.S. involvement in the Zairean military response.

==== Reagan Doctrine and constructive engagement ====
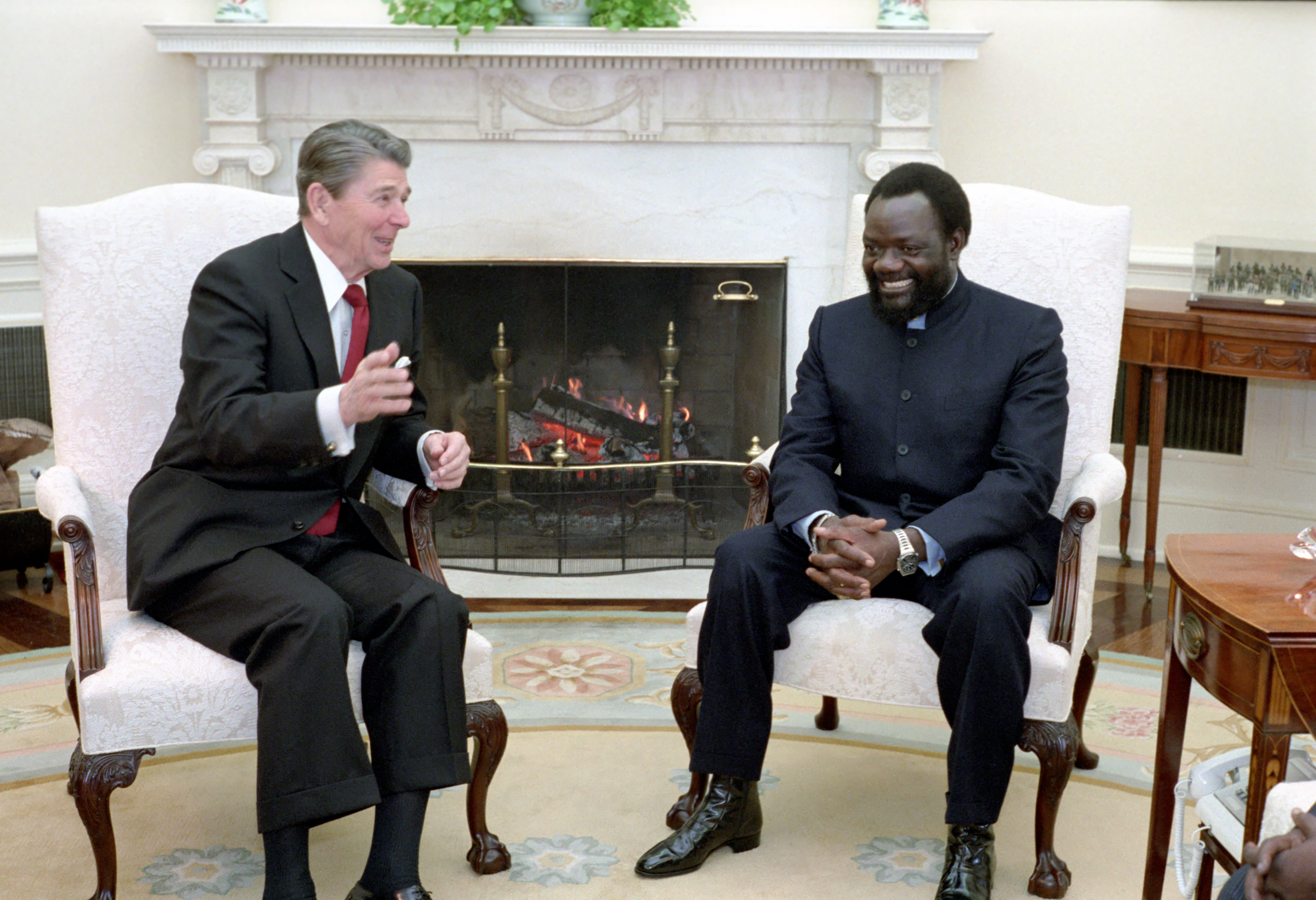
UNITA rebel Jonas Savimbi meets U.S. President Ronald Reagan at the White House, January 1986.

In the 1980s, UNITA – by then the dominant anti-government force in the ongoing Angolan Civil War – became a beneficiary of the so-called Reagan Doctrine, under which U.S. President Ronald Reagan extended American support to insurgents fighting Soviet proxies or allies worldwide. In 1981, the year of his election, Reagan announced his support for UNITA, urged Congress to repeal the Clark Amendment, and established high-level political contact with UNITA. In February 1986, the Reagan administration informed the Senate Foreign Relations Committee that, though it remained committed to a diplomatic solution of the ongoing Angolan Civil War, it planned to prevent a MPLA military victory by providing covert military aid to UNITA, beginning with $15 million in military assistance, primarily accounted for by Stinger anti-aircraft missiles. The announcement followed a meeting at the White House the previous month between Reagan and UNITA leader Jonas Savimbi; and it was enabled by the repeal of the Clark Amendment in 1985. Supporters of the U.S. alliance with UNITA linked it to objectives ranging from outright Angolan regime change to the mere provision of a bargaining chip with which to induce the MPLA-led government to negotiate with UNITA. Though the MPLA government had begun to demonstrate an increased willingness to improve relations with the U.S., it said the announcement of U.S. support for UNITA amounted to a declaration of war.

Especially in the first half of the 1980s, another cornerstone of Reagan's foreign policy was constructive engagement, which prescribed a conciliatory posture towards the apartheid regime in South Africa. One of the objectives of constructive engagement was to obtain leverage which could be used to resolve Southern Africa's complex of interlocking conflicts – not only the Angolan Civil War, but also the South African Border War and the ongoing South African occupation of Namibia (South West Africa). The architect of constructive engagement, U.S. Assistant Secretary of State for African Affairs Chester Crocker, advocated a principle of "linkage", by which South African withdrawal from Namibia was linked to – that is, made conditional on – Cuban withdrawal from Angola. The Angolan government objected strenuously to this approach, and the announcement of the UNITA aid programme stalled negotiations between 1986 and 1987. However, negotiations resumed, with the U.S. playing a central role, and ultimately resulted in Angola's signature of the Brazzaville Protocol and Tripartite Accord in December 1988.

==== Continued tensions ====
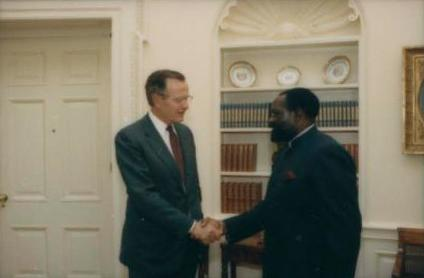
Savimbi meets U.S. President George H.W. Bush, October 1990.

Although the 1988 accords were welcomed as "open[ing] a new phase of American diplomacy", the U.S. failed to capitalise on improved conditions for a thaw in its relations with Angola, partly because of the continued influence of pro-UNITA individuals and groups in Washington. In January 1989, the outgoing Reagan administration proposed to send U.S. diplomats to Luanda, officially to monitor the implementation of the 1988 accords but also to provide a direct channel of communication between the American and Angolan governments. However, the U.S. was unwilling to accommodate an Angolan liaison in Washington, suggesting instead that the Angolans operate through their New York mission to the UN. Unable to secure a reciprocal offer, Angola rejected the proposal. An anti-American faction within MPLA argued that the U.S. was "moving the goalposts", failing to follow through on Reagan's implicit promise that a negotiated settlement – and the impending Cuban withdrawal from Angola – would be rewarded by improved relations.

The plausibility of this view was further strengthened by subsequent U.S. policy moves. First, also in January 1989, U.S. President-Elect George H.W. Bush wrote to Savimbi, promising UNITA "all appropriate and effective assistance" from his administration. Second, Bush's appointee as Assistant Secretary of State for African Affairs, Herman J. Cohen, expressed "a vigorously pro-UNITA position" during his confirmation hearings. And, third, it transpired that the American budget for aid to UNITA had increased from an estimated $30–45 million in 1988 to $50–60 million in 1989. By 1990, it amounted to up to $90 million; in total, it is estimated that the U.S. provided UNITA with $250 million in weapons assistance between 1986 and 1992. Given that South Africa's disengagement was a condition of the 1988 accords, this made the U.S. UNITA's primary external patron. Although American support for UNITA was weakened somewhat by the fall of the Berlin Wall, and by revelations about atrocities committed by Savimbi, a campaign to step away from the relationship failed to muster sufficient votes in Congress. Though the US government's financial support of Savimbi and UNITA insurgents was partly in-the-open, military aid was partly kept secret even when American service-members (who had lived under false names at Kamina airbase) died in aid operations.

Bush's administration avoided a high-profile role in the ongoing intra-Angolan peace process, preferring instead to support a mediation led by Mobutu in Gbadolite. The mediation failed and, amid a resurgence of the Angolan civil war, Angolan President José Eduardo Dos Santos cancelled a planned trip to Washington in February 1990, which the Bush administration did not want to occur until a ceasefire had been attained in Angola. However, the U.S. remained supportive of peace efforts, including those which led to the 1991 Bicesse Accords. When, in September 1992, Savimbi refused to accept the results of Angola's first multi-party elections and launched an offensive against MPLA forces, the Bush administration said that both parties were responsible for the resulting violence, and supported a new round of negotiations to assuage UNITA's "security concerns".

=== 1993–present: Formal diplomatic relations ===
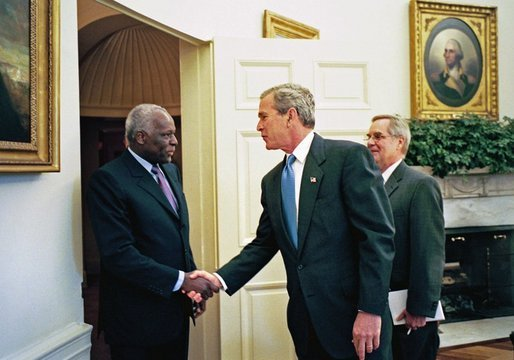
Presidents George W. Bush and José Eduardo dos Santos meet in the Oval Office, May 2004.

==== Détente and economic diplomacy ====
Under President Bill Clinton – whose inauguration was attended by an MPLA representative – the U.S. appeared increasingly impatient with UNITA's intransigence, while MPLA increasingly sought Western partners. On 19 May 1993, the U.S. extended formal diplomatic recognition to the MPLA-led government of Angola, a move viewed as calculated to pressure Savimbi into cooperation with ongoing peace talks. Clinton's administration subsequently expressed support for UN sanctions against UNITA, and publicly disavowed any prospect of Angolan regime change by UNITA-led coup. Following the Lusaka Protocol of 1994, Clinton secured congressional support for a UN peacekeeping mission in Angola, arguing that it "represented the last piece in a regional settlement in which the United States had significant economic and diplomatic investment". Between 1995 and 1997, the U.S. funded 30 per cent of the mission's expenditures, amounting to about $100 million in aid. In December 1995, Clinton received Angolan President Dos Santos at the White House, where they discussed bilateral economic relations and Angola's ongoing national reconciliation. On the latter point, a Clinton aide said that "the president put the screws to him [Dos Santos] and we got what we wanted".

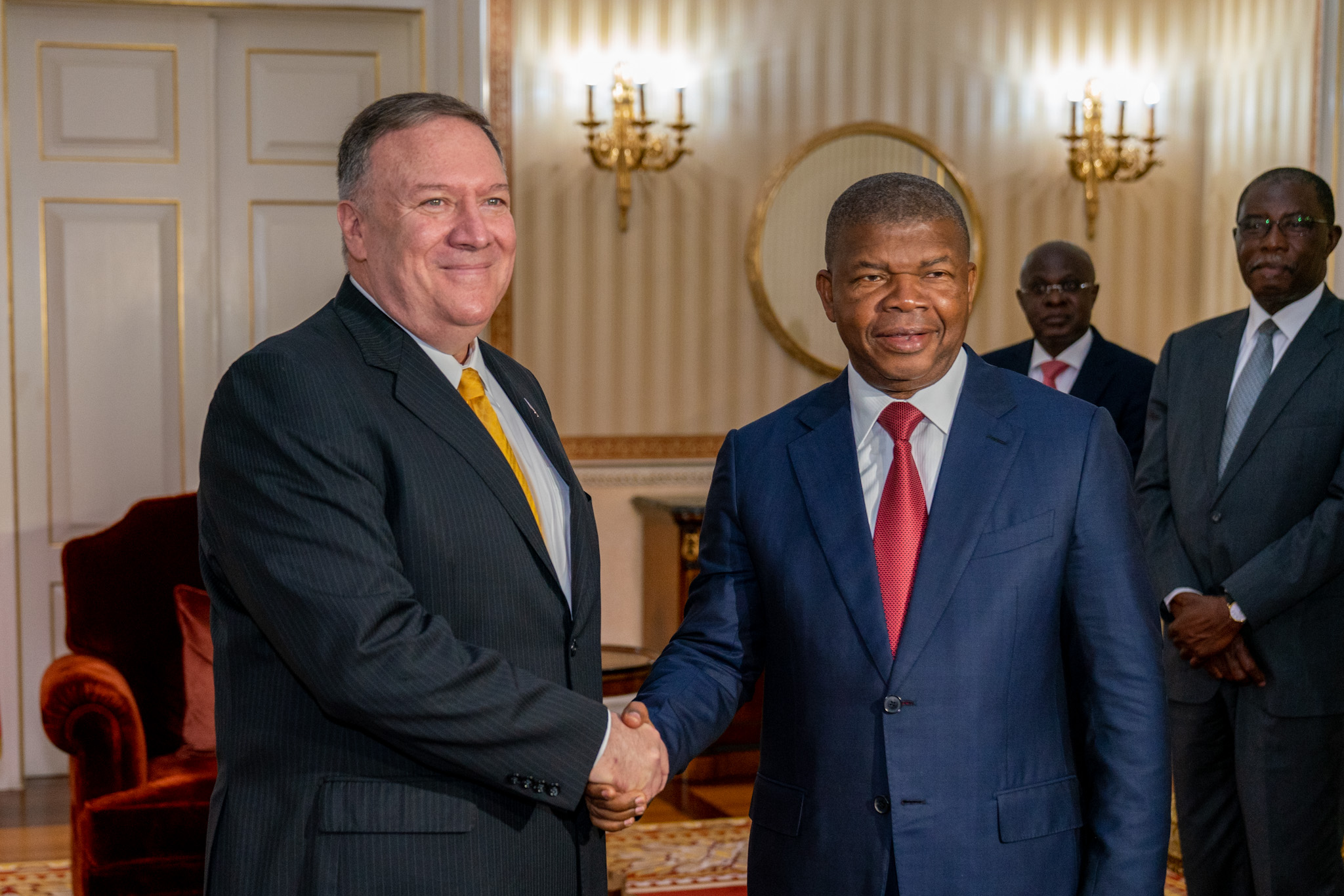
U.S. Secretary of State Mike Pompeo and Angolan President João Lourenço in Luanda, February 2020

UNITA, meanwhile, did not comply with U.S. urging to demobilise, and, into Clinton's second term, the civil war continued in parts of Angola. However, in 1998, the Deputy Assistant Secretary of State for African Affairs said, while visiting Angola, that the U.S. government "believes it is time to move our economic relations forward with Angola despite the current political-military problems in Angola". Initiatives included a state-endorsed trade mission to Angola in 1997, the formation of a Bilateral Consultative Commission in 1998, and a $350 million Export-Import Bank loan to U.S. oil equipment exporters in Angola. By the late 1990s, Angola was the U.S.'s third-largest trading partner in sub-Saharan Africa: the U.S. was consistently among its top three import markets and its primary export market. This trade relationship was centred on Angola's large oil industry: the U.S. received 90 per cent of Angolan oil exports, accounting in turn for seven per cent of U.S. oil imports. By 1999, Angola was the second-largest destination for American investment in sub-Saharan Africa, also concentrated in the oil sector.

==== Post-civil war relations ====
Angola held a temporary seat on the UN Security Council in 2003, and the U.S. and other Western countries reportedly lobbied the Angolan government heavily for its support for a draft resolution which would authorize the use of force against Saddam Hussein's regime in Iraq.

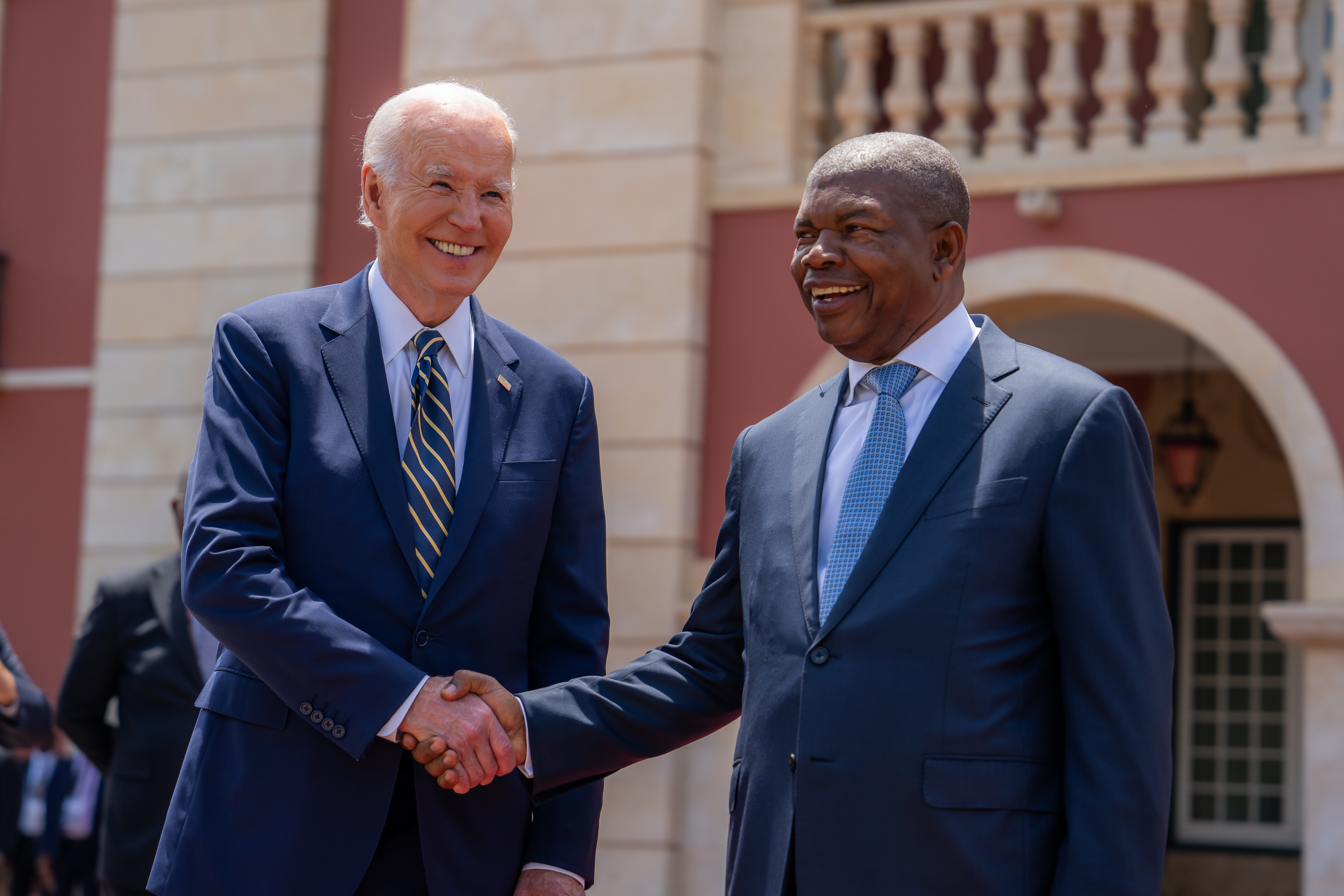
President Joe Biden on a visit to Angola, along with President João Lourenço; December 2024.

In 2009, the administration of U.S. President Barack Obama declared Angola one of the U.S.'s three key strategic partners in Africa, along with Nigeria and South Africa. Both Obama and his successor, Donald Trump, advanced the bilateral security partnership – including through a 2010 U.S.–Angola Strategic Partnership Dialogue and a 2017 Memorandum of Understanding – with a particular focus on security in the Gulf of Guinea. However, the U.S. and China have sometimes been viewed as competing for influence in Angola.

In December 2024, U.S. President Joe Biden visited Angola, the first by an American President. During the visit, President Biden met with President João Lourenço and discussed security and trade cooperation between both nations.

== Economic relations ==
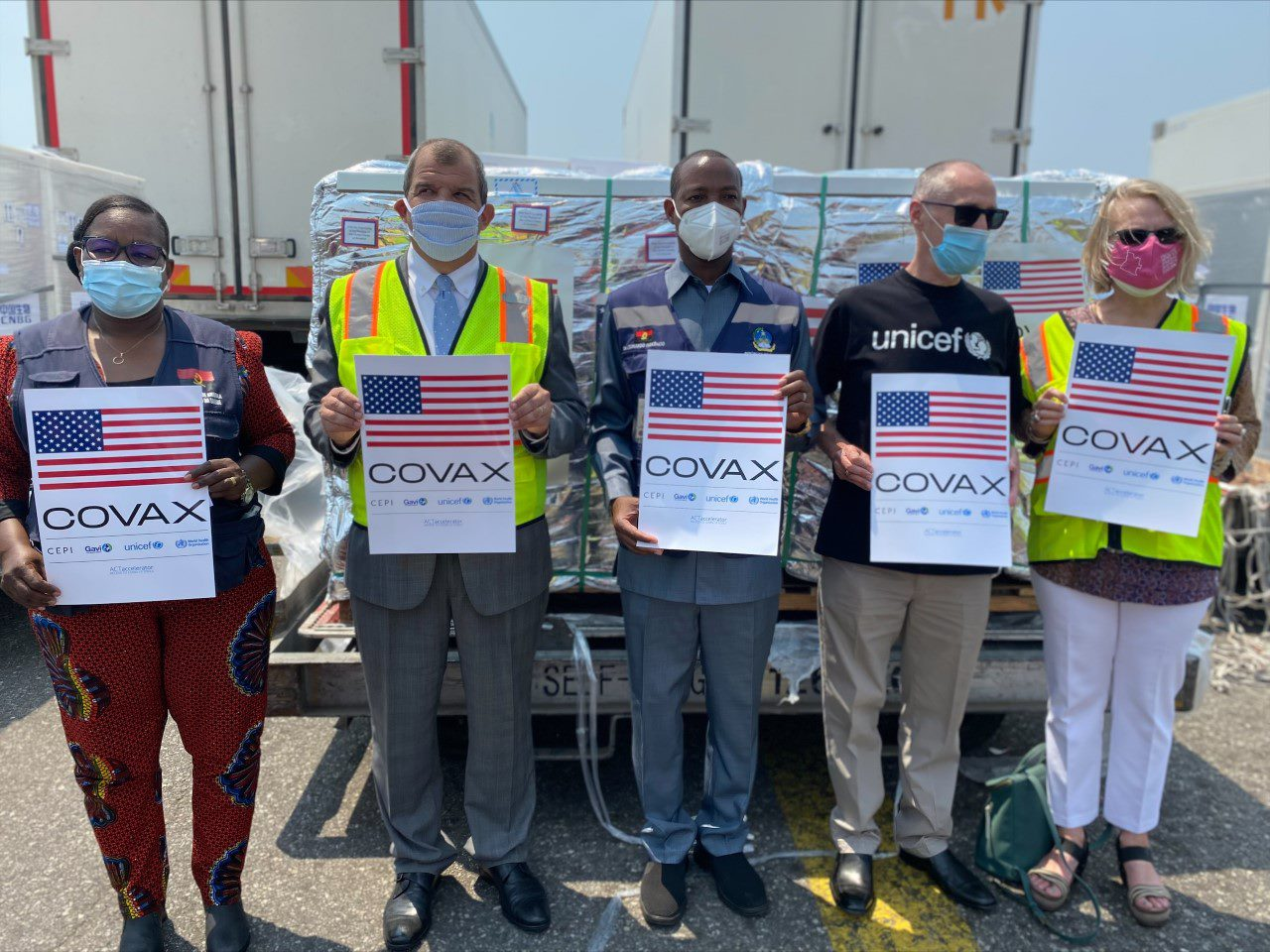
The U.S. delivers Coronavirus vaccines to Angola as part of the COVAX program in 2021.

The countries signed a Trade and Investment Framework Agreement in 2009, and Angola is eligible for preferential trade benefits under the African Growth and Opportunity Act. In 2019, total bilateral trade was worth $1.5 billion, with a $420 million trade imbalance in Angola's favour. Angolan oil exports to the U.S. have declined since 2008 and accounted for less than 0.5% of total U.S. oil imports in 2021; but Angola remained the U.S.'s third-largest trading partner in sub-Saharan Africa. Moreover, American oil companies, including Chevron and ExxonMobil, maintain major operations in Angolan oil fields. The oil sector has also fostered cultural links between the countries, including sister city partnerships (between Lafayette, Louisiana and Cabinda; and between Houston, Texas and Luanda) and corporate programmes which educate Angolan oil professionals in U.S. universities. As of 2022, the U.S. was Angola's primary source of official development assistance, just ahead of the European Union. U.S. aid disbursements to Angola amounted to $35.4 million in 2020, representing a substantial decrease from $64.4 million in 2001, and were concentrated in the health sector. During the COVID-19 pandemic, some of this assistance was provided under the COVAX programme; the U.S. government was the largest donor of COVID-19 vaccines to Angola. The Angolan military has also been a beneficiary of the U.S. International Military Education and Training programme.

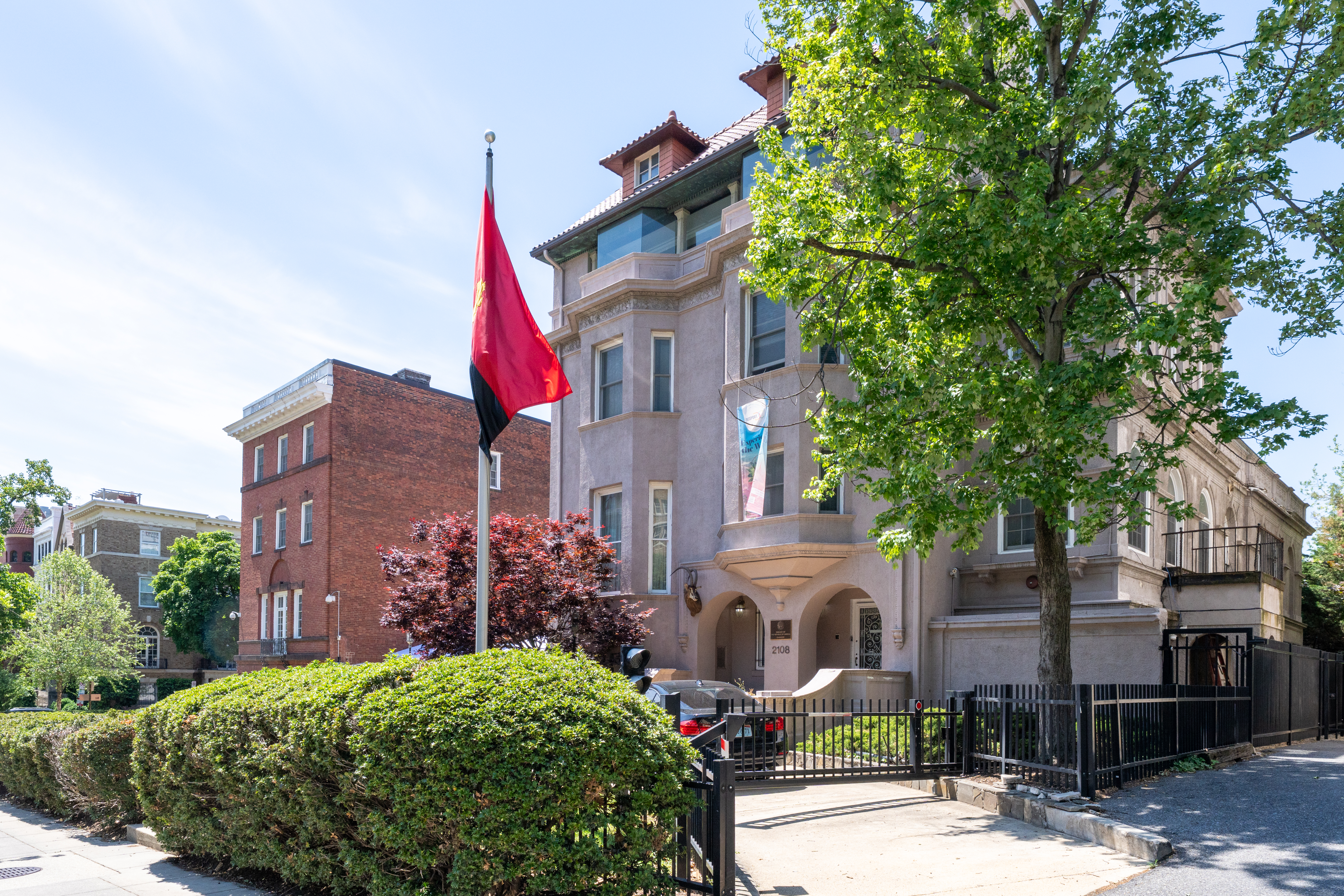
Embassy of Angola in Washington, D.C.

== Resident diplomatic missions ==
- Angola has an embassy in Washington, D.C. and has consulates-general in Houston and in New York City.
- United States has an embassy in Luanda.

== See also ==
- Angola–France relations
- Angola–Spain relations
- Frontline States
- Slavery in Angola
- CIA activities in Angola
- 1989 Angola Lockheed L-100 crash
- List of diplomatic visits to the United States by Angola
