= Operation IA Feature =

US operation in the Angolan Civil War

Operation IA Feature, a covert Central Intelligence Agency operation, authorized U.S. government support for Jonas Savimbi's National Union for the Total Independence of Angola (UNITA) and Holden Roberto's National Liberation Front of Angola (FNLA) militants in the Angolan Civil War. It was closely linked with parallel efforts by South Africa (Operation Savannah) and Zaire. President Gerald Ford approved the program on July 18, 1975 despite strong opposition from officials in the State Department and the CIA. The program's discovery shocked Congress into barring further U.S. involvement in Angola's Civil War through the Clark Amendment.

Ford told William Colby, the Director of Central Intelligence, to "go ahead and do it," with an initial US$6 million in funding. He granted an additional US$8 million in funding on July 27 and another US$25 million in August.

== Criticism ==
Two days prior to the program's approval Nathaniel Davis, the Assistant Secretary of State, told Henry Kissinger, the United States Secretary of State, that he believed maintaining the secrecy of IA Feature would be impossible. Davis correctly predicted the Soviet Union would respond by increasing its involvement in Angola, leading to more violence and negative publicity for the United States. When Ford approved the program Davis resigned. John Stockwell, the Chief of the CIA's Angola Task Force at Langley, echoed Davis' criticism saying the program needed to be expanded to be successful, but the program was already too large to be kept out of the public eye. Davis' deputy and former U.S. ambassador to Chile, Edward Mulcahy, also opposed direct involvement. Mulcahy presented three options for U.S. policy towards Angola on May 13, 1975. Mulcahy believed the Ford administration could use diplomacy to campaign against foreign aid to the Communist People's Movement for the Liberation of Angola (MPLA), refuse to take sides in factional fighting, or increase support for the FNLA and UNITA. He warned however that supporting UNITA would not sit well with Mobutu Sese Seko, the ruler of Zaire.

== Clark Amendment ==
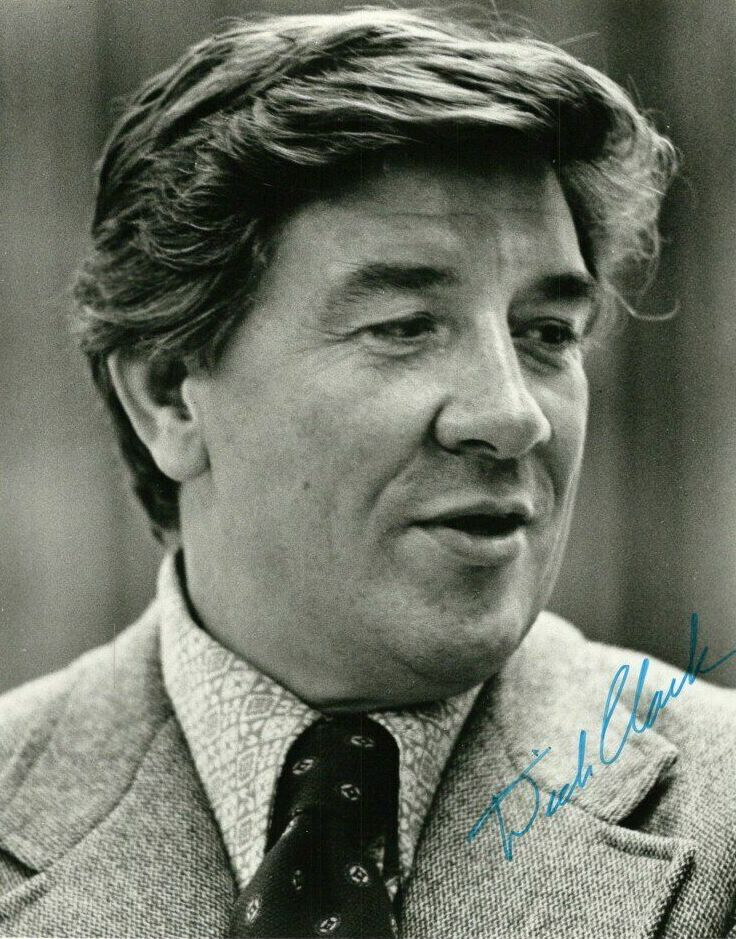
Senator Dick Clark

Dick Clark, a Democratic Senator from Iowa, who went on a fact-finding mission in Africa, proposed an amendment to the Arms Export Control Act, barring aid to private groups engaged in military or paramilitary operations in Angola. The Senate passed the bill, voting 54-22 on December 19, 1975 and the House of Representatives passed the bill, voting 323-99 on January 27, 1976. Even after the Clark Amendment became law, then-Director of Central Intelligence, George H. W. Bush, refused to concede that all U.S. aid to Angola had ceased. According to foreign affairs analyst Jane Hunter, Israel stepped in as a proxy arms supplier for the United States after the Clark Amendment took effect.

== See also ==
- CIA activities in Angola
