= Abacetus rufinus =

Scientific classification
- Kingdom: Animalia
- Phylum: Arthropoda
- Class: Insecta
- Order: Coleoptera
- Suborder: Adephaga
- Family: Carabidae
- Genus: Abacetus
- Species: A. rufinus

Binomial name
- Abacetus rufinus Straneo, 1943

Species of beetle

Abacetus rufinus is a species of ground beetle in the subfamily Pterostichinae. It was described by Straneo in 1943. It occurs in the Democratic Republic of the Congo and Angola. A. rufinus is reddish all around, in different oranges, yellows, and browns varying by developmental stage (immature or mature) and part of the body. The species has a shiny surface, with bright, lustrous elytra on the adults. It is closely related to A. levisulcatus, from which it is distinguished by the pronotum’s color, iridescence, and shape.

== Taxonomy ==
The species name rufinus is Latin for reddish or golden-red, after the beetle’s color.

== Distribution ==
Abacetus rufinus occurs in central Africa. Specifically, it has been recorded in Angola and the nearby province of Haut-Katanga in the Democratic Republic of the Congo. In the DRC, 6 immature specimens, and later one adult from the Royal Museum for Central Africa, were collected around the area of Kakielo (Kakyelo) and Katanga. In Angola, samples came from Munhango (120 km away from Luena, or Vila Luso) and Lumeje (115 km away from Luena). Straneo studied all of them, and he did not notice any difference between the two countries’ specimens.

== Description ==
=== Immature stages ===
==== Color and size ====
Immature Abacetus rufinus beetles are overall colored testaceous, like a brick, to ferruginous, like rust. The antennae, feet, and mouth are all yellow. The length of the whole body is generally around 7.7 mm and width 2.9 mm.

==== Head ====
This species has long and slender antennae. The head is minuscule compared to the other segments and has large eyes curved outward. It has pores and short, quite deep furrows above its eyes. Towards the first of the pores, the furrows diverge strongly.

==== Pronotum ====
On the thorax, the pronotum’s shape is trapezoid-adjacent, anteriorly moderately convex, and smallest at the posterior. It measures 1.7 to 2.1 mm posteriorly, 1.5 mm anteriorly, and 1.6 mm basally. The beetle’s anterior side is more strongly rounded than the posterior. The disc, or central area, of the pronotum is moderately convex, especially anteriorly. The anterior angles are quite close to the neck, not prominent, obtuse, and rounded. Meanwhile, the posterior angles are obtuse and end in a conspicuous tooth-like and narrow projection at the apex. Near the posterior angles, the margin of the elytral base, on the abdomen, is conjoined to the pronotum.

==== Elytra ====
The two elytra are subparallel, long, and convex. They have uniform, parallel grooves, as virtually all Abacetus species do. On the elytral base, there are punctures between them. These punctures are moderately developed laterally. Adults have 8 interstriations in total between the grooves.

=== Adult stage ===
In adults, both the dorsum and belly side are brown, however in different shades. The dorsum is colored brightly, the lustrous elytra most of all. The epipleura and interstriations are both ferruginous. So is the belly, and, to a lesser extent, the suture between the elytra. Its legs are of a lighter ferruginous shade, whereas the knees of each leg are darker than the rest of it. The first three sections of the antennae are ferruginous, the others brown.

=== Comparative morphology ===
A. rufinus closely resembles A. levisulcatus, a wide-ranging sympatric species with highly varied subspecies. They differ in the pronotum’s color, iridescence, and shape. A. rufinus’ pronotum is less convex and less narrowed posteriorly. It has more strongly pronounced basal (posterior; bordering the elytra) angles, and a distinctly larger gap between the lateral margins and longitudinal grooves.
