= Wilson dos Santos =

Angolan politician (died 1991)

- Born: Fernando Wilson dos Santos
- Died: November 1991; Angola
- Cause of death: murder
- Occupation: representative of UNITA

Fernando Wilson dos Santos (died November 1991) served as the representative of the National Union for the Total Independence of Angola (UNITA), a Freedom fighter group in Angola, to Portugal. His brother-in-law, Tito Chingunji, served as Foreign Secretary of UNITA, the principal rebel group that fought against the dos Santos government in Angola's civil war. He studied law at the University of Lisbon and the University of Coimbra in the late 1960s, and later at the Graduate Institute of International Studies in Geneva.

== Death and investigation ==
Wilson dos Santos was murdered in November 1991 by unknown persons. In the 1990s, UNITA Foreign Minister Tony da Costa Fernandes and UNITA Interior Minister General Miguel N'Zau Puna allegedly uncovered the fact that Jonas Savimbi ordered the assassinations of both dos Santos and Chingunji. Dos Santos and Chingunji's deaths and the defections of Fernandes and Puna weakened the UNITA's relationship with the United States and harmed Savimbi's international reputation. Savimbi denied the allegations.

== See also ==
- List of unsolved murders (1980–1999)
