= Clark Amendment =

Legislation that banned aid to paramilitary groups in Angola

The Clark Amendment was an amendment to the U.S. Arms Export Control Act of 1976, named for its sponsor, Senator Dick Clark (D-Iowa). The amendment barred aid to private groups engaged in military or paramilitary operations in Angola.

Even after the Clark Amendment became law, Director of Central Intelligence George H. W. Bush refused to concede that all U.S. aid to Angola had ceased. According to foreign affairs analyst Jane Hunter, Israel stepped in as a proxy arms supplier for the United States after the Clark Amendment took effect. The Clark Amendment was repealed by Congress in July 1985.

Visiting Washington, D.C. on October 5, 1989, Angolan guerrilla leader Jonas Savimbi praised the right-wing think tank The Heritage Foundation on behalf of his organization, UNITA, for advocating for the repeal of the Clark Amendment.

== See also ==
- Boland Amendment
- Angola–United States relations
- CIA activities in Angola
