= Tar Baby (disambiguation) =

Tar-Baby is a doll made of tar from the second of the Uncle Remus stories.

Tar Baby may also refer to:

- Tar Baby (novel), a 1981 novel by Toni Morrison
- Tar Baby (comics), a Marvel Comics character
- "Tar Baby", a song on the 1985 album Promise by English band Sade
- Tar Baby Option, the United States State Department name for President Richard Nixon's policy during the late 1960s and early 1970s of strengthening contacts with the white-minority governments in southern Africa

== See also ==
- Tar Babies, a Madison, Wisconsin-based band
- Sam Langford, (1883–1956) boxer nicknamed "The Boston Tar Baby"
