= List of ambassadors of Angola =

Below is a partial list of current ambassadors from Angola to other nations:

- Belgium: Mário de Azevedo Constantino
- Canada: Miguel Maria N'Zau Puna
- Egypt: Hendrick Vaal Neto
- Israel: Jose Joao Manuel
- Guinea-Bissau: Brito Sozinho
- Poland: Lizeth Nawanga Satumbo Pena
- Serbia: Toko Diakenga Serão
- Slovak Republic: Domingos Culolo
- United Kingdom: Ana Maria Teles Carreira
- United Nations: Ismael Abraão Gaspar Martins
- United States: Joaquim do Espirito Santo
- Algeria: Toko Diakenda Serão
- Argentina: Fidelino De Jesus Florentino Peliganga
- Austria: Teodolinda Rosa Rodrigues Coelho
- Brazil: Florêncio Mariano da Conceição e Almeida
- Cape Verde: Júlia De Assunção Cipriano Machado
