= Halloween Massacre (Angola) =

Conflict of the Angolan civil war

- Part of Angolan Civil War
Date	October 30 - November 1 1992
Location	Luanda, Angola
Result	Resumption of the Angolan Civil War

Belligerents
MPLA	UNITA

Commanders and leaders
José Eduardo dos Santos	Jonas Savimbi

Casualties and losses
Unknown	Thousands of UNITA supporters killed

The Halloween Massacre (also known as the Three Day War) was a purge of UNITA party members and supporters carried out by Angola's ruling MPLA from October 30 to November 1, 1992, in Luanda, Angola. The unrest occurred as a result of the breakdown of the Bicesse Accords, on account of alleged voter fraud in the 1992 Angolan general elections, resulting in renewed military tensions, assassinations of public figures, and acts of terrorism. Thousands of UNITA supporters are estimated to have been murdered.

== Background ==
Since independence from Portugal in 1975, Angola had been locked in a civil war between the MPLA and UNITA. The Marxist–Leninist MPLA received direct military support from Cuba with the backing of the Soviet Union and other communist states, whilst the UNITA branded itself as an anti-communist organization and received direct military support from South Africa and the United States. Neither side was able to claim total victory over the other.

As the Cold War began to draw to a close, Cuba and South Africa withdrew their troops from the conflict, forcing the MPLA and UNITA into negotiating a political settlement.

=== The Bicesse Accords ===
From 1 May 1991, UNITA and MPLA forces agreed on a framework to begin establishing peace in Angola between the two parties. This framework evolved into the Bicesse Accords, signed by the People's Republic of Angola and UNITA on 31 May 1991 in Lisbon, Portugal. The United States and the Soviet Union acted as observers, while Portugal mediated the talks. The accords set out a timetable and established certain conditions that each side agreed to meet by the specified dates. There were three key parts of the agreement; the beginning of a ceasefire (with the initial stages taking effect at the beginning of May and entering into force upon the signing of the accords), the integration of UNITA forces into the Angolan armed forces (which was to occur upon the implementation of the ceasefire agreement and had numerous provisions to establish the non-partisan nature of the armed forces), and a nationwide democratic election, which was to take place between 1 September and 30 November 1992.

=== 1992 Angolan general election ===
Angola's 1992 general elections took place on 29 and 30 September 1992. The MPLA claimed victory in these elections, taking roughly 53% of the vote and gaining 129 seats in the legislature whereas UNITA claimed 34% of the vote and gained 70 seats. For the presidency, José Eduardo dos Santos of the MPLA received 49% of the vote, compared to UNITA leader Jonas Savimbi's 40%. Despite having a higher percentage of the vote, dos Santos was just under the fifty percent majority required to be reelected. Because neither the MPLA nor UNITA obtained the required absolute majority of the presidential election, a follow-up election was necessary according to the constitution. Savimbi, in spite of the UN mission's declaration that the elections were generally free and fair, claimed that the government had rigged the elections, and began pulling UNITA's soldiers out of the new unified Angolan armed forces.

=== Rise in political violence ===
By October 1992, post-electoral unrest was spreading throughout the country. On 20 October, unidentified gunmen assassinated popular Angolan author Fernando Marcelino, sending shockwaves through the country. Two days later, a bomb destroyed the headquarters of the Banco de Comércio e Indústria in Luanda.

On 27 October, UNITA issued a series of demands which called for a second round of elections, to be organized solely by the UN or other impartial observers, "impartial" state media, immediate withdrawal of riot police from the streets, cessation of "arbitrary arrest and persecutions" of UNITA supporters, new electoral registration procedures, a new ballot, and a new electoral code of conduct. The MPLA issued a counter-proposal which agreed in principle to most of UNITA's demands, but also required that UNITA withdraw its military forces from all Angolan cities and voluntarily disarm. President dos Santos declined to meet Savimbi and negotiate in person before the rule of law was reinstated.

== Massacre ==
In the early hours of 30 October, Angolan police exchanged fire with UNITA troops at the Luanda airport, and twelve civilians were killed in the crossfire. The dead included three civilian Portuguese expatriates, which the police falsely attempted to present as mercenaries fighting for UNITA. At midnight, the UNITA militants returned and again opened fire on security forces at the airport. UNITA as well as the Angolan police and army began setting up roadblocks throughout the city.

On 31 October, Savimbi claimed the MPLA government had violated the ceasefire by attacking his political headquarters with artillery. Several senior UNITA officials in Luanda were subsequently killed in raids on their hotels and offices by the security forces.

Although it remains uncertain who provoked the massacre, MPLA supporters and the security forces began moving to eliminate key UNITA figures in Luanda on October 30. According to some reports, the MPLA had planned to orchestrate a purge of UNITA members over the course of weeks. Reports from residents of Luanda's suburbs claimed that "...arms were being distributed locally to government supporters and to former members of the security forces and militia", as well as reports that "police stations served as centres of [weapons] distribution". UNITA supporters were targeted in house to house searches by both police and armed government supporters, with some supporters possessing lists of local UNITA supporters who were to be rounded up. Some were summarily executed while others were taken to police stations and later released, though often after being beaten. Some people disappeared completely, with some human rights reports detailing accounts of security forces carrying out executions of suspected UNITA supporters.

Many of the targeted were of the Ovimbundu and Bakongo ethnic groups, which were the main supporters of the UNITA and considered to be potentially disloyal. Other opposition parties that supported UNITA's claim that the 1992 election results were illegitimate were also targeted. This included the Partido Social Democrata Angolano (PSDA), Angolan Social Democratic Party, Partido Democrático para o Progresso-Aliança Nacional Angolana (PDP-ANA), Democratic Progress Party/Angolan National Alliance and the Convenção Nacional Democrática de Angola (CNDA), Angolan National Democratic Convention.

== Results ==
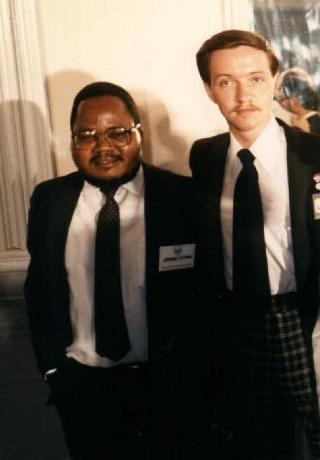
Jeremias Chitunda, Vice President of UNITA until his assassination on November 2nd, 1992

Several leading officials from UNITA were killed in the massacre, including the UNITA Vice President Jeremias Chitunda, negotiator Elias Salupeto Pena and party secretary Aliceres Mango. The total number of casualties ranges, with some sources saying the deaths numbered as high as 30,000.

== See also ==
- 1990s in Angola
- Angolan Civil War
- Bicesse Accords
- 1992 Angolan general election
