= Minister of Social Communication (Angola) =

Minister of Social Communication of Angola is a cabinet level position in the national government. The position was established in 1975 with João Filipe Martins.

== Name changes ==
- 1975–1992: Minister of Information
- 1992–present: Minister of Social Communication

== Ministers of Social Communication ==
- 1975–1976: João Filipe Martins
- 1990–1991: Boaventura da Silva Cardoso
- 1991–1992: Rui Óscar de Carvalho
- 1993–2005: Pedro Hendrick Vaal Neto
- 2005–2010: Manuel António Rabelais
- 2010–2012: Carolina Cerqueira
- 2012–2017: José Luís de Matos
- 2017–2019: Anibal João da Silva Melo
- 2019–present: Nuno dos Anjos Caldas Albino
