= Jeremias Chitunda =

Angolan politician

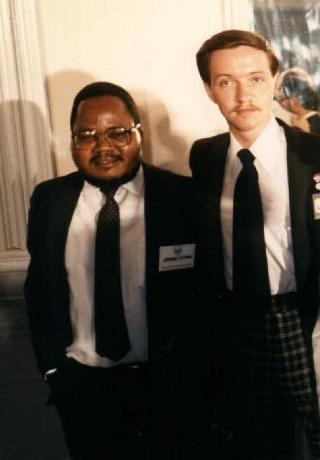
Chitunda and Rafael Picklesimer of the Central Intelligence Agency in Washington, D.C. in 1986

Jeremias Kalandula Chitunda (February 20, 1942 – November 2, 1992) was an Angolan politician who served as vice president of UNITA until his assassination in Luanda, as part of the Halloween Massacre shortly after the first round of the presidential election, held on September 29–30. He was UNITA's second-in-command, after Jonas Savimbi.

== Early life and education ==
Chitunda was born in Chimbuelengue, Angola, on February 20, 1942, to Emilio Chitunda and Rosalina Kalombo, attended Chimbuelengue and Dondi Mission School in Bela Vista before proceeding to João de Castro College and the Huambo National Secondary School. He later received a scholarship to attend the University of Arizona in Tucson, Arizona, where he obtained a degree in mining engineering.

== Political career ==
Chitunda moved from Angola to Zaire, fearing arrest by the Portuguese colonial authorities. In 1966, he joined UNITA, serving as its representative to the U.S. southwest before being promoted to representative to the U.S. in 1976. He became vice president of UNITA in August 1986 at UNITA's sixth party congress.

== Assassination ==
In 1992, after decades of war between UNITA and the governing MPLA, the first Presidential elections were scheduled. José Eduardo dos Santos officially received 49.57% of the vote and UNITA leader Jonas Savimbi won 40.6%. Because no candidate received 50% of the vote, election law dictated a second round of voting between the top two contenders.

Savimbi, along with many other election observers, said the election had been neither free nor fair. But he sent Chitunda, then Vice President of UNITA, and Elias Salupeto Pena, a UNITA senior advisor, to Luanda to negotiate the terms of the second round.

The election process broke down on October 31 when government troops in Luanda attacked UNITA. Civilians, using guns they had received from police a few days earlier, conducted house-to-house search and raids with the Rapid Intervention Police, killing and detaining hundreds of UNITA supporters. The government took civilians in trucks to the Camama cemetery and Morro da Luz ravine, shot them, and buried them in mass graves. On November 2, 1992, assailants attacked Chitunda's convoy, pulling him and another UNITA official from their car and shooting both of them in their faces.

State-run television displayed the bodies of Chitunda and Pena. To this date, their bodies have not been returned to their families for burial and their whereabouts have not been released by the Angolan government.

== See also ==
- List of unsolved murders (1980–1999)
