= Hendrick Vaal Neto =

Angolan diplomat

Minister of Social Communication of Angola
- In office 1993–2005
- Preceded by: Rui Óscar de Carvalho
- Succeeded by: Manuel Antonio Rabelais

Angolan Ambassador to Egypt
- In office January 27, 2006 – September 12, 2011
- Preceded by: Kamu de Almeida
- Succeeded by: António da Costa Fernandes

Personal details
- Born: November 22, 1944 (age 81) Kwanza Sul

Pedro Hendrick Vaal Neto (born 1944) is an Angolan former diplomat. A member of the National Liberation Front of Angola until the 1990s. Until September 12, 2011, Neto was the Angolan ambassador to Egypt.

Studying in Caconda, Ambriz, Huambo, Benguela and Luanda, he participated in various political seminars in Switzerland, Zambia and the United States before dedicating his life to the liberation of Angola in 1959, living in the woods to escape persecution. Over thirteen years, he travelled to more than eighty countries around the world. In 1963 he was persecuted by the PIDE and joined the National Liberation Front of Angola in the north of Angola and moved to the Democratic Republic of Congo, where he attended the Institut National D'Etudes Politiques. Until July 21, 1981, he lived in Lisbon. He was made Minister of Social Communication on June 1, 1999 with a presidential decree. From September 12, 2011, his ambassadorship to Egypt, Jordan, Syria, Iran, Iraq, Yemen, Oman and Lebanon ended and he was appointed a representative to Zimbabwe.
