= Elias Salupeto Pena =

Angolan politician (born 1992)

- Died: 2 November 1992
- Occupations: a representative of UNITA, politician
- Known for: being murdered
- Family: Jonas Savimbi (distant relative)

Elias Salupeto Pena (died 2 November 1992) served as the representative of the National Union for the Total Independence of Angola (UNITA), an anti-Communist rebel group that fought against the People's Movement for the Liberation of Angola (MPLA) in the Angolan Civil War, to the Joint Military and Political Commission. Pena was a distant relative of, and a senior advisor to, UNITA leader Jonas Savimbi.

== Death ==
The government killed Pena along with Jeremias Chitunda, the Vice President of UNITA, in Luanda in November 1992, following the first round of the presidential election in what was known as the Halloween Massacre.

== See also ==
- List of unsolved murders (1980–1999)
