= Anibal João Melo =

Angolan writer and journalist

João Melo

Minister of Social Communication of Angola
- Incumbent
- Assumed office 2017
- Preceded by: José Luís de Matos

Personal details
- Born: September 5, 1955 (age 71) Luanda, Angola
- Party: MPLA
- Education: Universidade Federal Fluminense; Universidade Federal do Rio de Janeiro
- Known for: Author; Journalist; Poet

Anibal João da Silva Melo (born September 5, 1955) is a writer, journalist, and was a member of the National Assembly of Angola. Melo currently serves in the position of the Ministro da Comunicação Social.

== Early life and education ==
Anibal João Melo was born on September 5, 1955, in Luanda Province, Angola. His family included his father, Anibal de Melo and his mother, Helena Guerra. Due to his father's military service and political career toward Angolan independence, he lived without his father for most of his childhood. He eventually reconnected with his father when he was fifteen. Aníbal João attended Faculdade de Direito, Coimbra, later attending Universidade Federal Fluminense, located in Niteroi province, Rio de Janeiro, Brasil, where he obtained a Bachelor's degree in Journalism. In 1991, he graduated from his studies at Universidade Federal Fluminense, obtaining an undergraduate degree. In 1994, he obtained a master's degree in communication and culture from Universidade Federal do Rio de Janeiro.

== Career ==
He has been a writer since 1985 with his first poem collection Definição, and has been writing ever since. Then He went on to join the National Assembly of Angola.

== Publications ==
- Definição (1985)
- Fabulema (1986)
- Poemas Angolanos (1989)
- Tanto Amor (1989)
- Canção do Nosso Tempo (1991)
- O caçador de nuvens (1993)
- Limites e Redundâncias (1997)
- A luz mínima (2004)
- Todas as palavras (2006)
- Autorretrato (2007)
- Novos poemas de amor (2009)
- Cântico da terra e dos homens. Lisboa: Editorial Caminho, 2010. ISBN 9789722121323

=== Other works ===
Short stories were later added to his repertoire

- Imitação de Sartre e Simone de Beauvoir (1998)
- Filhos da Pátria (2001)

== Honors ==
- Prémio Maboque de Jornalismo (2008)
