= António da Costa Fernandes =

Angolan politician

António Fwaminy da Costa Fernandes

Ambassador of Angola to Egypt
- In office 1 June 2011 – 2019

Ambassador of Angola to India
- In office 2005–2011

Ambassador of Angola to the United Kingdom and Northern Ireland
- In office 1994–2005

Personal details
- Born: 26 April 1942 (age 84) Cabinda, Angola
- Party: UNITA (until 1992)
- Education: University of Fribourg
- Awards: Order of the Hero of the National Independence

António Fwaminy da Costa Fernandes aka Tony da Costa Fernandes (Cabinda, 26 April 1941) is an Angolan politician. He served as UNITA's representative to the United Kingdom. Along with Jonas Savimbi, he was co-founder of UNITA. He has been Angola's ambassador to Egypt, the United Kingdom, and India, and non-resident ambassador to Thailand.

== UNITA ==
Costa Fernandes studied with Savimbi, the future leader of UNITA, in Switzerland. In November 1963 they went to Portugal, planning an uprising against Portuguese colonial authorities in Angola.

Later, when UNITA allied with the People's Republic of China, Costa Fernandes recruited the first refugees in Zambia to go to China for military training. He went along with fourteen other men.

He served as the Foreign Minister of UNITA.

In the 1990s Fernandes and UNITA Interior Minister General Miguel N'Zau Puna allegedly uncovered the fact that UNITA leader Jonas Savimbi ordered the assassinations of both Wilson dos Santos, UNITA's representative to Portugal, and Tito Chingunji, one of Costa Fernandes' predecessors. Dos Santos and Chingunji's deaths and the defections of Fernandes and Puna weakened the U.S.-UNITA relationship and seriously harmed Savimbi's international reputation. Costa Fernandes left UNITA in 1992.
