= Joaquim do Espirito Santo =

Angolan diplomat

His Excellency Joaquim do Espirito Santo

Ambassador of Angola to the United States
- Incumbent
- Assumed office 2016

Personal details
- Born: July 12, 1959 (age 67)
- Children: 2
- Education: Paris Institute of Political Studies

Joaquim do Espirito Santo (born July 12, 1959) is Angola's ambassador to the United States.

== Education ==
Espirito Santo earned a master's degree in political science from the Paris Institute of Political Studies and a degree in economics from Agostinho Neto University in Luanda. He also speaks several African languages, English, Spanish, Portuguese and French.

== Diplomatic career ==
From 1992 to 1993, Espirito Santo served as Assistant at the Office of Analysis and Economic Studies of the Ministry of External Relations. In 1993, he transferred to the Secretariat of State for Cooperation, where he served as director of the Directorate of International Organizations until 1995 and as Director for Europe of the Secretariat of State Cooperation from 1995 to 1997. In 1997 Espirito Santo returned to the Ministry of Foreign Affairs as Director for Europe until 1999. The following three years, he was the Director for Africa and the Middle East of the Ministry of Foreign Affairs. From 2002 to 2004 he served as Minister Counselor and Chargé d'Affaires at the Embassy of Angola in Mexico. After his service at the Embassy of Angola, from 2004 to 2009, Espirito Santo served as Minister Counselor at the Embassy of Angola in France.

From 2011 to 2018 he was the Director for Africa, Middle East and Regional Organizations of the Ministry of Foreign Affairs. Since 2019, Espirito Santo has been Angola's ambassador to the United States of America.

== Personal life ==
Espirito Santo is married with two children.
