= Christine Messiant =

French sociologist

Christine Messiant (1947 - 2006 ) was a French sociologist considered an authority in the field of political sociology in post-colonial Angola. She died on 3 January 2006.
