= Abacetus levisulcatus =

Scientific classification
- Kingdom: Animalia
- Phylum: Arthropoda
- Class: Insecta
- Order: Coleoptera
- Suborder: Adephaga
- Family: Carabidae
- Genus: Abacetus
- Species: A. levisulcatus

Binomial name
- Abacetus levisulcatus Straneo, 1939

Species of beetle

Abacetus levisulcatus is a species of ground beetle in the subfamily Pterostichinae. It was described by Straneo in 1939. The species is endemic to Ethiopia, where specimens have been collected from the shores of Lake Harsadi (Adda) and Lake Tana (Gorgora).
