= Munhango =

- Commune
- Location in Angola
- Coordinates: 12°10′S 18°33′E
- Country: Angola
- Province: Bié Province
- Time zone: UTC+1 (WAT)
- Climate: Aw

Munhango is a city in the province of Bié in Angola. It is a small town located on the Benguela Railway.

The city is notable as the birthplace of Angolan general Jonas Savimbi, who led UNITA resistance forces in Angola from 1966 until his death in 2002.
