= Tar Baby option =

Term for a US policy during the late 1960s and 1970s

"Tar Baby" was the name given by the United States State Department to Richard Nixon's policy during the late 1960s and 1970s of strengthening contacts with the white-minority governments in Rhodesia and apartheid-era South Africa. The allusion was to the Uncle Remus story in which Brer Fox tries to capture Brer Rabbit by making a tar baby. Brer Rabbit strikes the tar "baby" with his hands, feet, and head and eventually becomes completely adhered to it. The policy option, described as a partial relaxation of economic action against Rhodesia and South Africa, and derived from NSSM: 39, was based on the presumption that apartheid and colonial rule were an unpleasant but undeniable reality and that Washington should accommodate itself pragmatically to the status quo. According to Nixon, if the United States was to be an influence for enlightened change it must do so by offering the "carrot" and eschewing the "stick". This policy would have to be pursued ad infinitum to get it to work.

== Controversy ==
There is an increasing level of controversy into the potential racial motivation behind Nixon and Henry Kissinger's support for the implementation of the 'Tar Baby' option aside from his ideological adherence to realpolitik. Mainly, "stemming from (their) demeaning attitude toward Africa and black Africans."

As Secretary of State under Gerald Ford, Kissinger pivoted from the Tar Baby Option in favor of black-majority rule stating that "it would not have been predicted [...] that a Republican administration would take the lead in bringing about the breakthrough to majority rule in Southern Africa." South African apartheid would not end until 1994, over 17 years after Kissinger left the State Department.
