= CIA activities in Angola =

This article deals with the activities of the U.S. Central Intelligence Agency (CIA) in Angola. The list of activities may be incomplete due to the clandestine nature of the subject matter.

== 1975-1976 ==
The civil war in Angola took place following the former colony’s independence from Portugal in November 1975. The war was a power struggle between former anti-colonial guerrilla movements, the communist People's Movement for the Liberation of Angola (MPLA) and the anti-communist National Union for the Total Independence of Angola (UNITA). As background to the reports of Cuban action, "[Fidel] Castro decided to send troops to Angola on November 4, 1975, to support MPLA forces and to counter South Africa's intervention on behalf of UNITA. See Cuban intervention in Angola for more information. The United States knew about South Africa's covert invasion plans, and collaborated militarily with its troops, contrary to what Secretary of State Henry Kissinger testified before Congress and wrote in his memoirs. Cuba made the decision to send troops without informing the Soviet Union and deployed them, contrary to what has been widely alleged, without any Soviet assistance for the first two months.

"In a meeting including President Ford, Secretary of State Kissinger, Secretary of Defense James Schlesinger, and CIA Director William Colby among others, U.S. intervention in Angola's civil war is discussed. In response to evidence of Soviet aid to the MPLA, Secretary Schlesinger says, "we might wish to encourage the disintegration of Angola.” Kissinger describes two meetings of the 40 Committee oversight group for clandestine operations in which covert operations were authorized: “The first meeting involved only money, but the second included some arms package." Beginning in 1975, the CIA participated in the Angolan Civil War, hiring and training American, British, French and Portuguese private military contractors, as well as training National Union for the Total Independence of Angola (UNITA) rebels under Jonas Savimbi, to fight against the Popular Movement for the Liberation of Angola (MPLA) led by Agostinho Neto.

The CIA funded UNITA with $32 million in cash and $16 million of weapons. Support was channeled through President Mobutu of the Congo. After MPLA and its Cuban and Russian allies took the capital, the CIA planned on funding an insurgency against the provisional Angolan government but was unable to secure funding in Congress. John Stockwell commanded the CIA's Angola effort in 1975 to 1976.

In a meeting including President Richard Nixon and Chinese Vice-Premier Deng Xiaoping, Teng referred to an early conversation between Nixon and Mao Zedong regarding Angola. "We hope that through the work of both sides we can achieve a better situation there. The relatively complex problem is the involvement of South Africa. And I believe you are aware of the feelings of the black Africans toward South Africa." No CIA personnel were present, but this is mentioned in the context of setting US policy toward Angola, where CIA did have covert operations.

United States Secretary of State Henry Kissinger replied, "We are prepared to push South Africa as soon as an alternative military force can be created." Nixon added "We hope your Ambassador in Zaire can keep us fully informed. It would be helpful."

Deng said "We have a good relationship with Zaire but what we can help them with is only some light weapons." To this, Kissinger replied, "We can give them weapons, but what they really need is training in guerrilla warfare. If you can give them light weapons it would help, but the major thing is training. Our specialty is not in guerrilla warfare (laughter in transcript)?" Deng mentioned that at various times, China had trained all the factions in Angola.

== 1980s ==
Savimbi was strongly supported by the conservative Heritage Foundation. Heritage foreign policy analyst Michael Johns and other conservatives visited regularly with Savimbi in his clandestine camps in Jamba and provided the rebel leader with ongoing political and military guidance in his war against the Angolan government. During a visit to Washington, D.C. in 1986, Reagan invited Savimbi to meet with him at the White House. Following the meeting, Reagan spoke of UNITA winning "a victory that electrifies the world." Savimbi also met with Reagan's successor, George H. W. Bush, who promised Savimbi "all appropriate and effective assistance."

The killing of Savimbi in February 2002 by the Angolan military led to the decline of UNITA's influence. Savimbi was succeeded by Paulo Lukamba Gato. Six weeks after Savimbi's death, UNITA agreed to a ceasefire with the MPLA, but even today Angola remains deeply divided politically between MPLA and UNITA supporters. Parliamentary elections in September 2008 resulted in an overwhelming majority for the MPLA, but their legitimacy was questioned by international observers.

== In popular culture ==
The video game Call of Duty: Black Ops II uses CIA activities in Angola as part of the game context and setting.

== See also ==
- CIA activities by country
