= Miguel Maria N'Zau Puna =

Angolan politician (1932–2022)

Member of the Angola National Assembly
- In office 2008–2022

Angola Ambassador to Canada
- In office September 28, 2000 – 2008

Personal details
- Born: 23 February 1933 Cabinda, Angola
- Died: 17 July 2022 (aged 89) Luanda, Angola
- Party: MPLA
- Other political affiliations: UNITA

Miguel Maria N'Zau Puna (1932 – 17 July 2022) has served as the ambassador of Angola to Canada from September 28, 2000 to 2008.

He served as Secretary-General of UNITA, an anti-Communist rebel group that fought against the MPLA during the Angolan Civil War from 1966 until right before the 1992 presidential election.
