= Jonas Savimbi =

Angolan politician and rebel leader (1934–2002)

General Jonas Savimbi
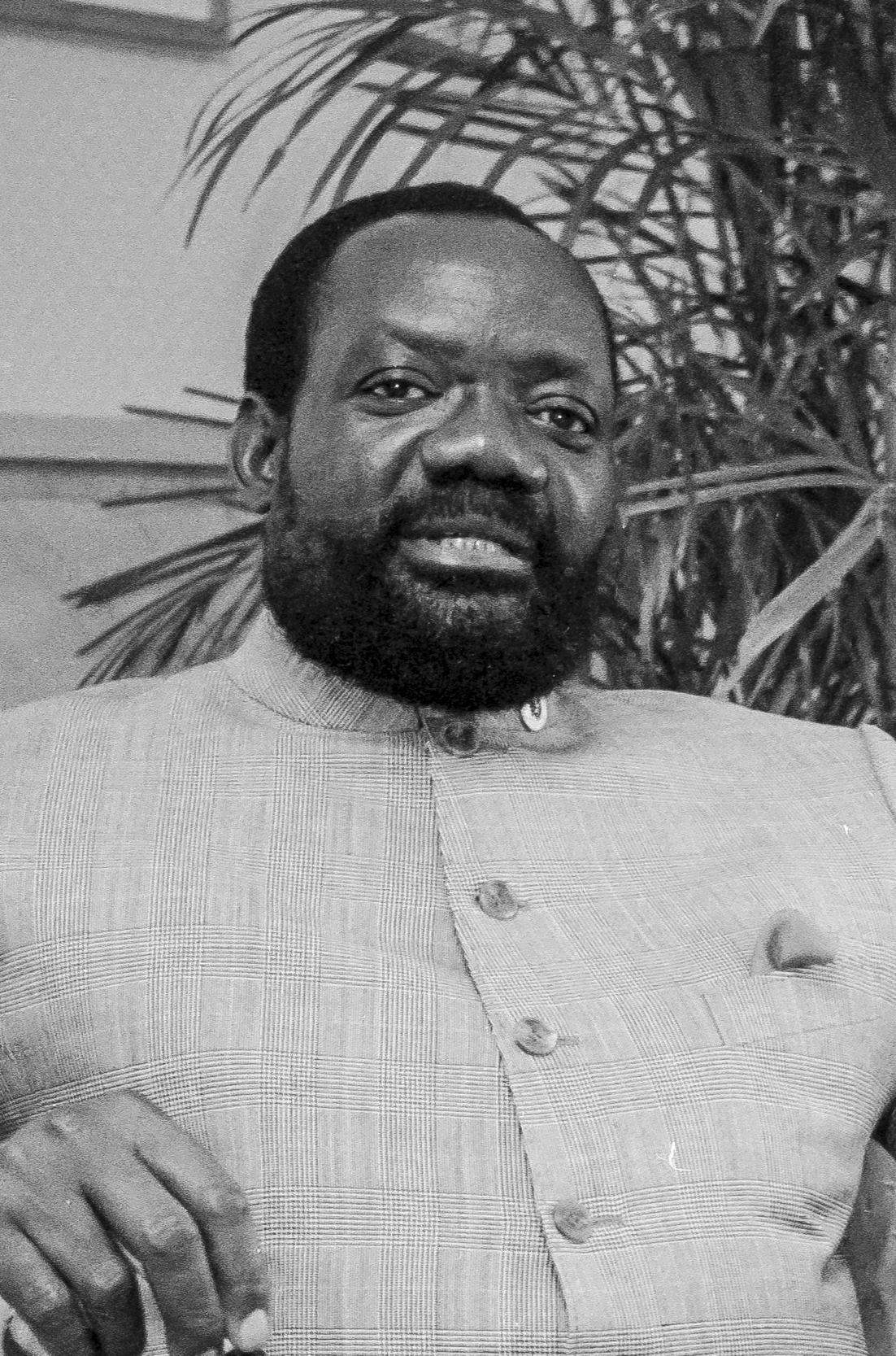
- Savimbi in October 1990
- Born: Jonas Malheiro Sidónio Sakaita Savimbi; 3 August 1934; Munhango, Bié Province, Portuguese Angola
- Died: 22 February 2002 (aged 67); Lucusse, Moxico Province, Angola
- Cause of death: Gunshot wounds
- Military career
- Allegiance: Political organizations: FNLA (1961-1964); MPLA (1964–1965); UNITA (1966–2002); State: Democratic People's Republic of Angola (1975–1976, 1979–2002)
- Service years: 1964–2002
- Rank: General
- Commands: President and Supreme Commander of UNITA (1966–2002)
- Known for: Co-President and President of the Democratic People's Republic of Angola
- Conflicts: Angolan War of Independence; Angolan Civil War

Jonas Malheiro Sidónio Sakaita Savimbi (Portuguese: [ˈʒɔnɐʃ ˈsavĩbi]; 3 August 1934 – 22 February 2002) was an Angolan revolutionary, politician, and rebel military leader who founded and led the National Union for the Total Independence of Angola, also known as UNITA. UNITA was one of several groups which waged a guerrilla war against Portuguese colonial rule from 1966 to 1974. Once independence was achieved, it then became an anti-communist group, which confronted the ruling People's Movement for the Liberation of Angola, also known as the MPLA, during the Angolan Civil War. Savimbi was killed in a clash with government troops in 2002.

== Early life and education ==
Jonas Malheiro Sidónio Sakaita Savimbi was born on 3 August 1934 in Munhango, Bié Province, a small town on the Benguela railway, and raised in Chilesso, in the same province. Savimbi's father, Lote, was a stationmaster on Angola's Benguela railway line and a Protestant preacher at Igreja Evangélica Congregacional de Angola (Evangelical Congregational Church of Angola), which was founded and maintained by American missionaries. Both his parents were members of the Bieno, an Ovimbundu group. The Ovimbundu later served as Savimbi's largest political base of support in Angola.

In his early years, Savimbi was educated mainly in Protestant schools, but also attended Roman Catholic schools. At age 24, he was awarded a scholarship from the United Church of Christ to study medicine at the University of Lisbon. In Portugal, he became associated with students from Angola and other Portuguese colonies who were then preparing themselves for resistance to Portuguese colonialism in Angola. Some of these contacts, including Agostinho Neto, who Savimbi knew, had contacts with the Portuguese Communist Party, which was then outlawed. Neto, who was studying medicine with Savimbi in Portugal, later became president of the MPLA and Angola's first president after the end of colonial rule in Angola.

Facing growing pressure from the Portuguese secret police, known as PIDE, Portuguese and French communists aided Savimbi in escaping Portugal for Lausanne, Switzerland, where he secured a new scholarship awarded by American missionaries. Savimbi began studying social sciences and then enrolled in the University of Fribourg for further studies. (Note: Bridgland 1988, pp. 421ff reproduces the legend that Savimbi started studying medicine in Portugal, and concluded these studies in Geneva. In fact, he never studied medicine, and obtained a degree in the social and political sciences, the nature of which was never established. However, as is customary in Portuguese-speaking countries, Savimbi was from then on addressed as "Dr". While it was often assumed in other countries that Savimbi (like Agostinho Neto) held a doctoral degree, his degree was in fact roughly comparable to that of the European BA.)

At the University of Fribourg, probably in August 1960, he met Holden Roberto, who was already a rising star in Angolan émigré circles. Roberto was a founding member of the National Liberation Front of Angola (FNLA), and supported Angolan independence at the United Nations. In the early 1960s, Roberto attempted to recruit Savimbi into the FNLA, but Savimbi was then undecided whether he wished to commit his life to the cause of Angolan independence.

In late September 1960, Savimbi was invited to give a speech in Kampala, Uganda on behalf of the União Democrática dos Estudantes da Africa Negra (UDEAN), a student organization affiliated with the MPLA. At this meeting, he met Tom Mboya, who took Savimbi to Kenya to meet with Jomo Kenyatta. Mboya and Kenyatta both urged Savimbi to join the UPA. Following the meeting, Savimbi told French media, "J'ai été convaincu par Kenyatta" ("I was convinced by Kenyatta"). Savimbi immediately wrote Roberto offering his service, and Mboya and Savimbi then both visited New York City.

In December 1960, following Savimbi's return to Switzerland, Roberto telephoned him and invited him to meet in Léopoldville in present-day Kinshasa. Savimbi then departed on his first of many visits to the United States. In 1961, Savimbi joined the UPA. (Note: In his statement of resignation from the FNLA, Savimbi says he joined "at the end of 1961". This corresponds with George Houser's statement, perhaps taken from the same source, that Savimbi joined in "late 1961".)

Savimbi remained in exile in Léopoldville until the end of March 1961, and then went to Switzerland to prepare for examinations. In December 1961, he transferred from the University of Fribourg to Lausanne University, where he studied law and international politics. In 1965, Savimbi was awarded a Ph.D. from Lausanne University.

== Career ==
=== Opposition to Portuguese colonialism ===
In September 1961, African students from Portuguese colonies studying abroad formed União Geral dos Estudantes da Africa Negra Sob Dominacão Colonial Portuguesa (UGEAN) during a meeting in Rabat, Morocco. UGEAN maintained an affiliation with the MPLA.

While continuing to study in Switzerland, Savimbi maintained an active leadership position in União Nacional dos Estudantes Angolanos (UNEA). In September 1961, he traveled to Yugoslavia for the first summit of the Non-Aligned Movement, and he and Holden Roberto then visited the United Nations in New York City that autumn.

In December 1961, Roberto chaired a meeting at Camp Green Lane in Green Lane, Pennsylvania, near Philadelphia, Pennsylvania, which Savimbi attended. Following this meeting, in March 1962 in Lucerne, Switzerland, Savimbi became one of several founding organizers and was elected secretary-general of UNEA.

Savimbi was also a member of UPA's executive committee, in which he encouraged the Partido Democrático de Angola (PDA) to join UNEA in a united front with the UPA, which led to the founding of the Frente Nacional de Libertação de Angola (FNLA), which then formed Governo Revolucionário de Angola no Exílio (GREA) on April 3, 1962, in which Savimbi served as foreign minister.

=== Angolan War of Independence ===
In the early 1960s, seeking a leadership position in the MPLA, Savimbi joined the MPLA Youth in the early 1960s. He was rebuffed by the MPLA, and joined forces with the National Liberation Front of Angola (FNLA) in 1964. The same year, Savimbi conceived UNITA with Antonio da Costa Fernandes. Savimbi went to China for help and was promised arms and military training. Upon returning to Angola in 1966, he launched UNITA and began his career as an anti-Portuguese guerrilla fighter. He also fought the FNLA and MPLA, as the three resistance movements tried to position themselves to lead a post-colonial Angola. In 2008, PIDE, Portugal's secret police, released documents revealing that, prior to Angola's independence in 1975, Savimbi signed a collaboration pact with the agency to fight the MPLA.

Following the Angolan War of Independence in 1975, Savimbi began gradually drawing the attention of Chinese and, ultimately, American policymakers and intellectuals. In the 1960s, Savimbi received military training in China, and began developing as a highly successful guerrilla fighter schooled in classic Maoist approaches to warfare, including baiting his enemies with multiple military fronts, some of which attacked and some of which consciously retreated. Like the People's Liberation Army of Mao Zedong, Savimbi mobilized important ethnic segments of the rural peasantry, especially among Angola's Ovimbundu tribe, which proved a central component of his military tactics. From a military strategy standpoint, he is considered one of the most effective guerrilla leaders of the 20th century.

=== Angolan Civil War ===
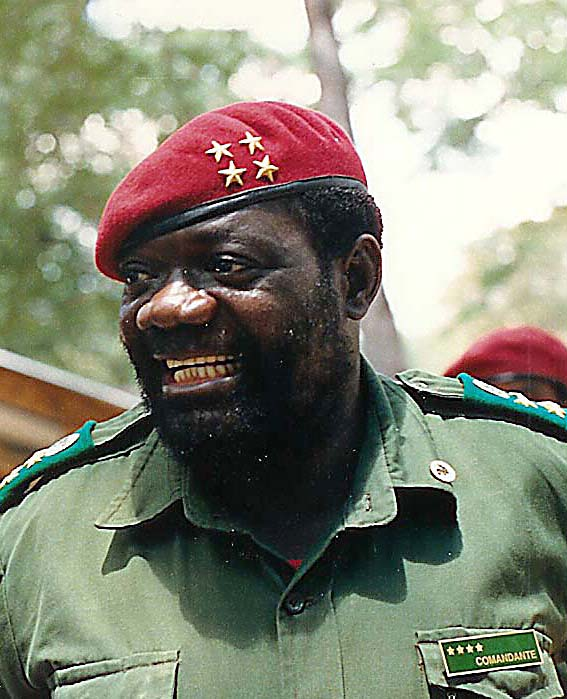
Savimbi during the Angolan Civil War

The Angolan Civil War emerged as a central proxy war in the Cold War. Beginning in 1974, the MPLA was supported by the Soviet Union. Three years later, in 1977, the MPLA declared itself Marxist-Leninist. Savimbi, on the other hand, subsequently renounced his earlier Maoist leanings and contacts with China, and presented himself globally as an anti-communist.

==== United States support ====
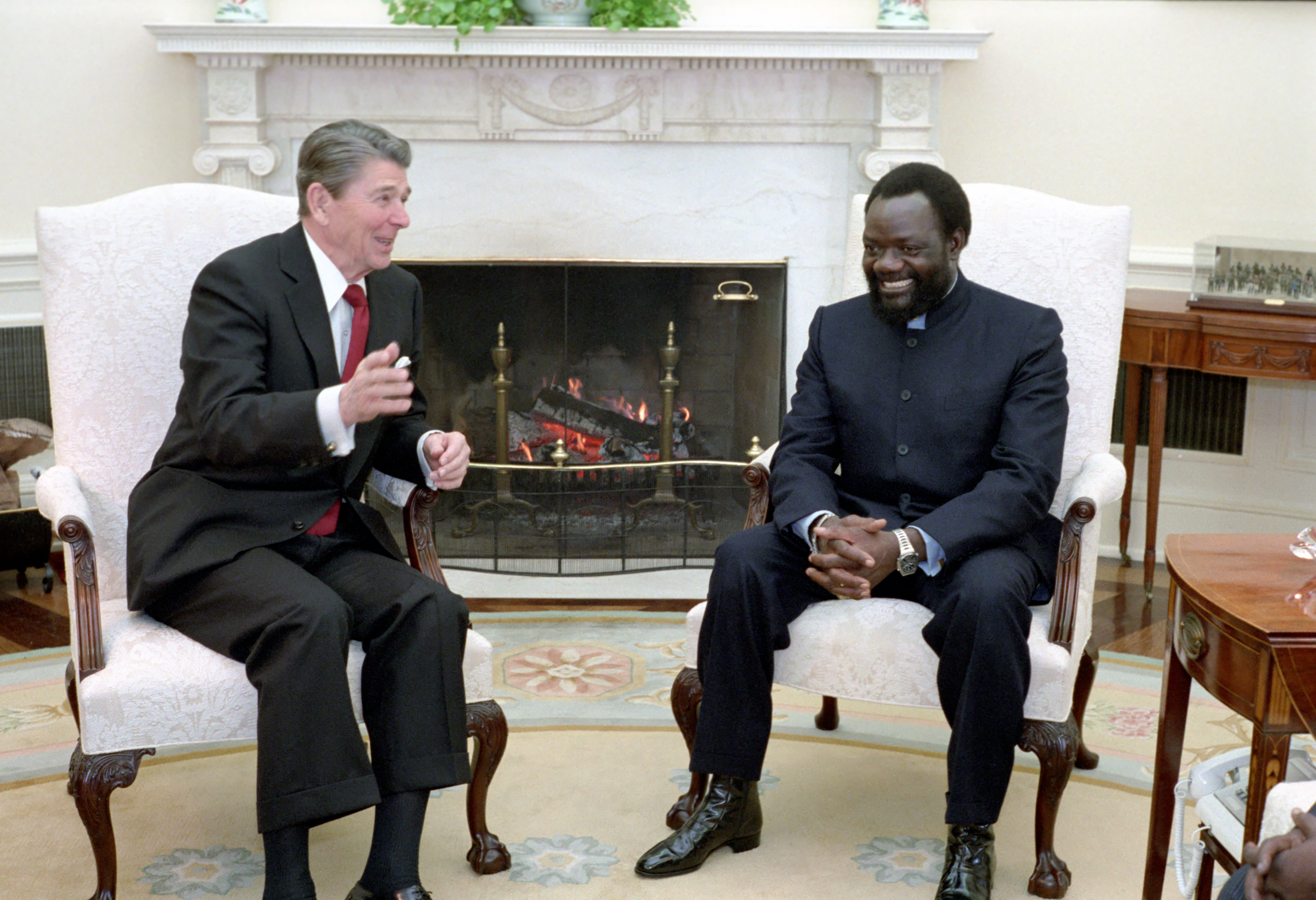
Savimbi with U.S. President Ronald Reagan in the Oval Office in 1986

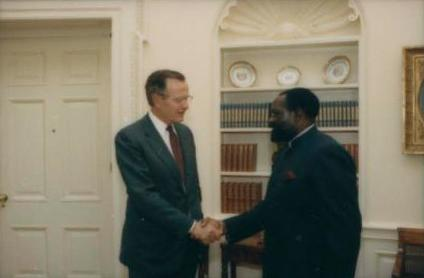
Savimbi greeting U.S. President George H. W. Bush in 1990

In 1985, with the backing of the Reagan administration and aided by lobbying efforts from Paul Manafort and his firm, Black, Manafort, Stone and Kelly, which was paid $600,000 annually from Savimbi beginning in 1985, Jack Abramoff and other U.S. conservatives organized the Democratic International in Savimbi's base in Jamba, in Cuando Cubango Province in southeastern Angola. Savimbi was strongly supported by the influential, conservative Heritage Foundation. Heritage foreign policy analyst Michael Johns and other conservatives visited regularly with Savimbi in his clandestine camps in Jamba and provided the rebel leader with ongoing political and military guidance in his war against the Angolan government.

Savimbi's U.S.-based supporters ultimately proved successful in convincing the Central Intelligence Agency to channel covert weapons and recruit guerrillas for Savimbi's war against Angola's Marxist government. During a visit to Washington, D.C. in 1986, Reagan invited Savimbi to meet with him at the White House. Following the meeting, Reagan spoke of UNITA winning "a victory that electrifies the world."

Two years later, with the Angolan Civil War intensifying, Savimbi returned to Washington, where he praised the Heritage Foundation's work on UNITA's behalf.

==== Military and political efforts ====
Complementing his military skills, Savimbi also impressed many with his intellectual qualities. He spoke seven languages fluently including Portuguese, French, and English. In visits to foreign diplomats and in speeches before American audiences, he often cited classical Western political and social philosophy, ultimately becoming one of the most vocal anti-communists of the Third World.

Savimbi's biography describes him as "an incredible linguist. He spoke four European languages, including English although he had never lived in an English-speaking country. He was extremely well read. He was an extremely fine conversationalist and a very good listener." Savimbi also accused his political opponents of witchcraft. These contrasting images of Savimbi would play out throughout his life, with his enemies calling him a power-hungry warmonger, and his American and other allies calling him a critical figure in the West's bid to win the Cold War.

As U.S. support began to flow liberally and leading U.S. conservatives championed his cause, Savimbi won major strategic advantages in the late 1980s, and again in the early 1990s, after having taken part unsuccessfully in the general elections of 1992. As a consequence, Moscow and Havana began to reevaluate their engagement in Angola, as Soviet and Cuban fatalities mounted and Savimbi's ground control increased.

By 1989, UNITA held total control of several limited areas, but was able to develop significant guerrilla operations everywhere in Angola, with the exception of the coastal cities and Namibe Province. At the height of his military success, in 1989 and 1990, Savimbi was beginning to launch attacks on government and military targets in and around the country's capital, Luanda. Observers felt that the strategic balance in Angola had shifted and that Savimbi was positioning UNITA for a possible military victory.

Signaling the concern that the Soviet Union was placing on Savimbi's advance in Angola, Soviet leader Mikhail Gorbachev raised the Angolan war with Reagan during numerous U.S.-Soviet summits. In addition to meeting with Reagan, Savimbi also met with Reagan's successor, George H. W. Bush, who promised Savimbi "all appropriate and effective assistance."

=== 1990s ===
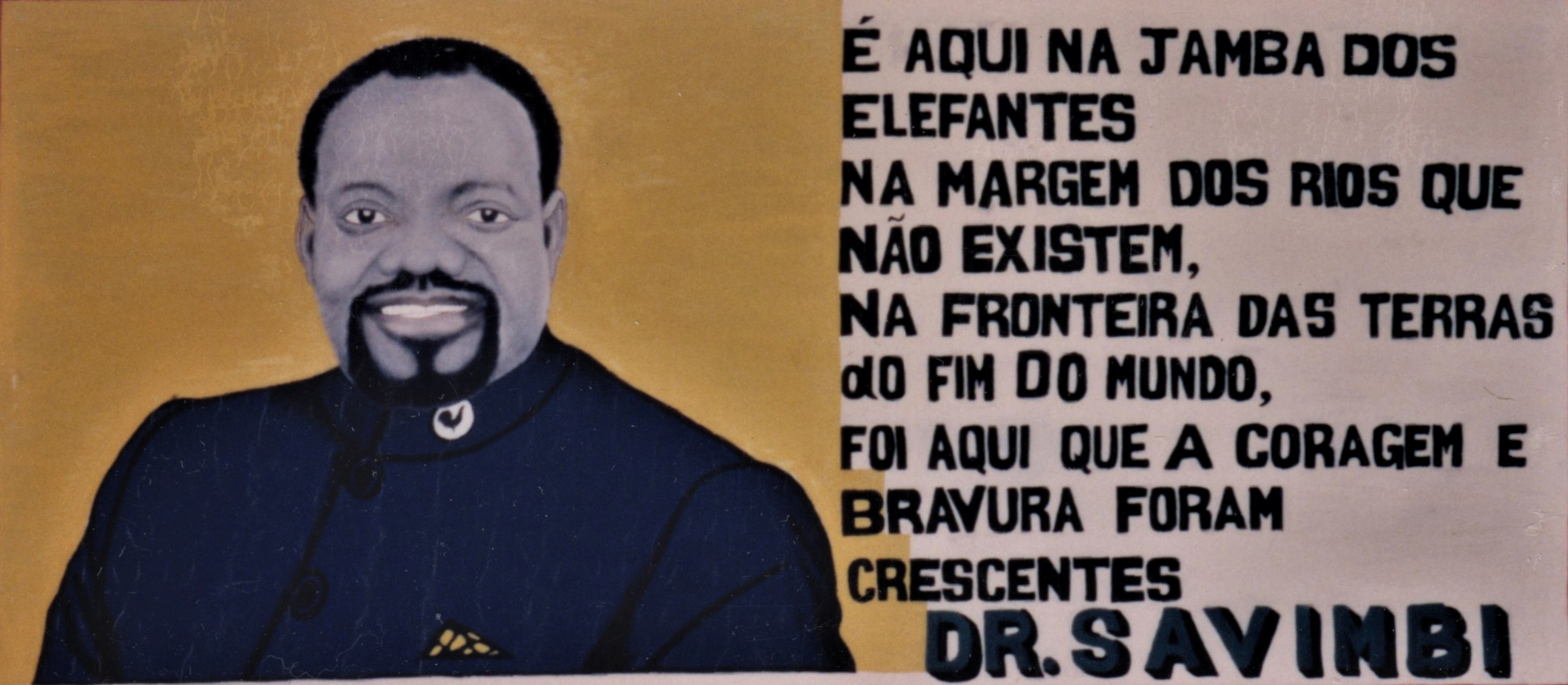
A billboard of Savimbi in Jamba, UNITA's headquarters in southeastern Angola. Under his image, the caption reads, "Here in Jamba of the elephants, on the banks of vanished rivers, on the frontier at the end of the earth, it was here that courage and bravery were bred."

In January 1990 and again in February 1990, Savimbi was wounded in armed conflict with Angolan government troops. The injuries did not prevent him from again returning to Washington, where he met with his American supporters and President Bush in an effort to further increase US military assistance to UNITA. Savimbi's supporters warned that continued Soviet support for the MPLA was threatening broader global collaboration between Gorbachev and the US.

In February 1992, Antonio da Costa Fernandes and Nzau Puna defected from UNITA, declaring publicly that Savimbi was not interested in a political contest, but on preparing another war. Under military pressure from UNITA, the Angolan government negotiated a cease-fire with Savimbi, and Savimbi ran for president in the national elections of 1992. Foreign monitors claimed the election to be fair. But because neither Savimbi (40 percent) nor Angolan President José Eduardo dos Santos (49%) obtained the 50 percent necessary to prevail, a run-off election was scheduled.

In late October 1992, Savimbi dispatched UNITA Vice President Jeremias Chitunda and UNITA senior advisor Elias Salupeto Pena to Luanda to negotiate the details of the run-off election. On 2 November 1992 in Luanda, Chitunda and Pena's convoy was attacked by government forces and they were both pulled from their car and shot dead. Their bodies were taken by government authorities and never seen again. The MPLA offensive against UNITA and the FNLA has come to be known as the Halloween Massacre where over 10,000 of their voters were massacred nationwide by MPLA forces. Alleging governmental electoral fraud and questioning the government's commitment to peace, Savimbi withdrew from the run-off election and resumed fighting, mostly with foreign funds. UNITA again quickly advanced militarily, encircling the nation's capital of Luanda.

In 1994, UNITA signed a new peace accord. Savimbi declined the vice-presidency that was offered to him and again renewed fighting in 1998.

Savimbi reportedly purged those within UNITA whom he saw as threats to his leadership or as questioning his strategic course. According to Fred Bridgland, Savimbi's foreign secretary Tito Chingunji and much of his family, possibly numbering more than 60, were murdered in 1991 after Savimbi suspected that Chingunji had been in secret, unapproved negotiations with the Angolan government during Chingunji's various diplomatic assignments in Europe and the United States. Savimbi denied his involvement in the Chingunji killing and blamed it on UNITA dissidents. According to Bridgland in his book The War for Africa: Twelve Months that Transformed a Continent, in an earlier incident termed 'Red September', Savimbi oversaw the torture and killing of dozens of people, including many of his own officers, their wives and children, in a witchcraft ritual. Bridgland also stated that Aurora Katalayo (widow of UNITA leader Mateus Katalayo, whom Savimbi had allegedly killed a few years earlier) and her four-year old son were burned alive, accused of witchcraft. In May 1992, the high-ranking UNITA members Tony da Costa Fernandes and Miguel N'Zau Puna left the rebel group, stating that at least five people had been executed on Savimbi's orders in August 1991. These included Chingunji, his brother-in-law, his sister and the latter's two children (aged 6 and 13).

== Death ==
After surviving more than six assassination attempts, and having been reported dead at least 17 times, Savimbi was killed on 22 February 2002, in a battle with Angolan government troops along riverbanks in the province of Moxico, his provincial birthplace. In the firefight, Savimbi sustained 15 gunshot wounds to his head, throat, upper body and legs. While Savimbi returned fire, his wounds proved fatal, and he died almost instantly. The Angolan Armed Forces subsequently confirmed Savimbi's death in the firefight, saying, "he had died like a soldier, 'with a gun in his hand'."

Savimbi's somewhat mystical reputation for eluding the Angolan military and their Soviet and Cuban military advisors led many Angolans to question the validity of reports of his 2002 death in combat until pictures of his bloodied and bullet-riddled body appeared on Angolan state television, and the United States State Department subsequently confirmed it. He was interred in Luena Main Cemetery in Luena, Moxico Province. On 3 January 2008, his tomb was vandalised and four members of the youth wing of the MPLA were charged and arrested. His body was exhumed and reburied publicly in 2019.

=== Legacy ===
Savimbi was succeeded by António Dembo, who assumed UNITA's leadership on an interim basis in February 2002. But Dembo had sustained wounds in the same attack that killed Savimbi, and he died from them three days later. Dembo was succeeded by Paulo Lukamba Gato.

Six weeks after Savimbi's death, a ceasefire between UNITA and the MPLA was signed, but Angola remains deeply divided politically between MPLA and UNITA supporters. A parliamentary election in September 2008 resulted in an overwhelming majority for the MPLA, but its legitimacy was questioned by international observers.

In the years since Savimbi's death, his legacy has been a source of debate. "The mistake that Savimbi made, the historical, big mistake he made, was to reject (the election) and go back to war", Alex Vines, head of the Africa program at London-based Chatham House research institute said in February 2012. Africa expert Paula Roque, of the University of Oxford, says Savimbi was "a very charismatic man, a man who exuded power and leadership. We can't forget that for a large segment of the population, UNITA represented something."

He was survived by "several wives and dozens of children", the latter numbering at least 25.

== In popular culture ==
Savimbi is a minor character in Call of Duty: Black Ops II, a video game that was released in 2012. Savimbi is voiced by Robert Wisdom. Three of Savimbi’s children took issue with Savimbi's representation in the game, claiming that he was portrayed as a "big halfwit who wanted to kill everybody". However, Activision, the publishers of Black Ops II, argued that the game portrayed him as a "political leader and strategist". The lawsuit was rejected by a French court.

== See also ==
- Kimberley Process Certification Scheme

== Notes and references ==
=== Bibliography ===
- Bridgland, Fred (1988), Jonas Savimbi: A Key to Africa, Hodder & Stoughton, ISBN 0-340-42218-1
- Chilcote, Ronald H (1972), Emerging nationalism in Portuguese Africa, Stanford, CA: Hoover Institution Press, Stanford University, ISBN 0-8179-1971-6
- Heywood, Linda M. "Unita and Ethnic Nationalism in Angola." Journal of Modern African Studies 27.1 (1989): 47–66.
- Houser, George M. (1989), No One Can Stop The Rain: Glimpses of Africa's Liberation Struggle, New York: The Pilgrim Press, ISBN 0-8298-0795-0
- Loiseau, Yves (1987), Portrait d'un Révolutionaire en Général: Jonas Savimbi (in French), Paris: La Table Ronde, ISBN 2-7103-0330-2
- Messiant, Christine (October 2003), "Les Églises et la dernière guerre en Angola. Les voies difficiles de l'engagement pour une paix juste" [The Churches and the last war in Angola: the difficult paths of engagement for a fair peace], Social Sciences & Missions (in French) (13), LFM: 75–117.
- Neto, Pedro Figueiredo. "The Consolidation of the Angola–Zambia Border: Violence, Forced Displacement, Smugglers and Savimbi." Journal of Borderlands Studies 32.3 (2017): 305–324.
- Paget, Karen (2015), Patriotic Betrayal: The Inside Story of the CIA's Secret Campaign to Enroll American Students in the Crusade Against Communism, New Haven and London: Yale University Press, ISBN 978-0-300-20508-4
- Siler, Michael J (2004), Strategic Security Issues in Sub-Saharan Africa: A Comprehensive Annotated Bibliography, p. 311.
- Tvedten, Inge. "US Policy towards Angola since 1975." Journal of Modern African Studies 30.1 (1992): 31–52.
- Windrich, Elaine. Cold War Guerrilla: Jonas Savimbi, the U.S. Media & the Angolan War (1992) 183 pp.
