= Women in Africa =

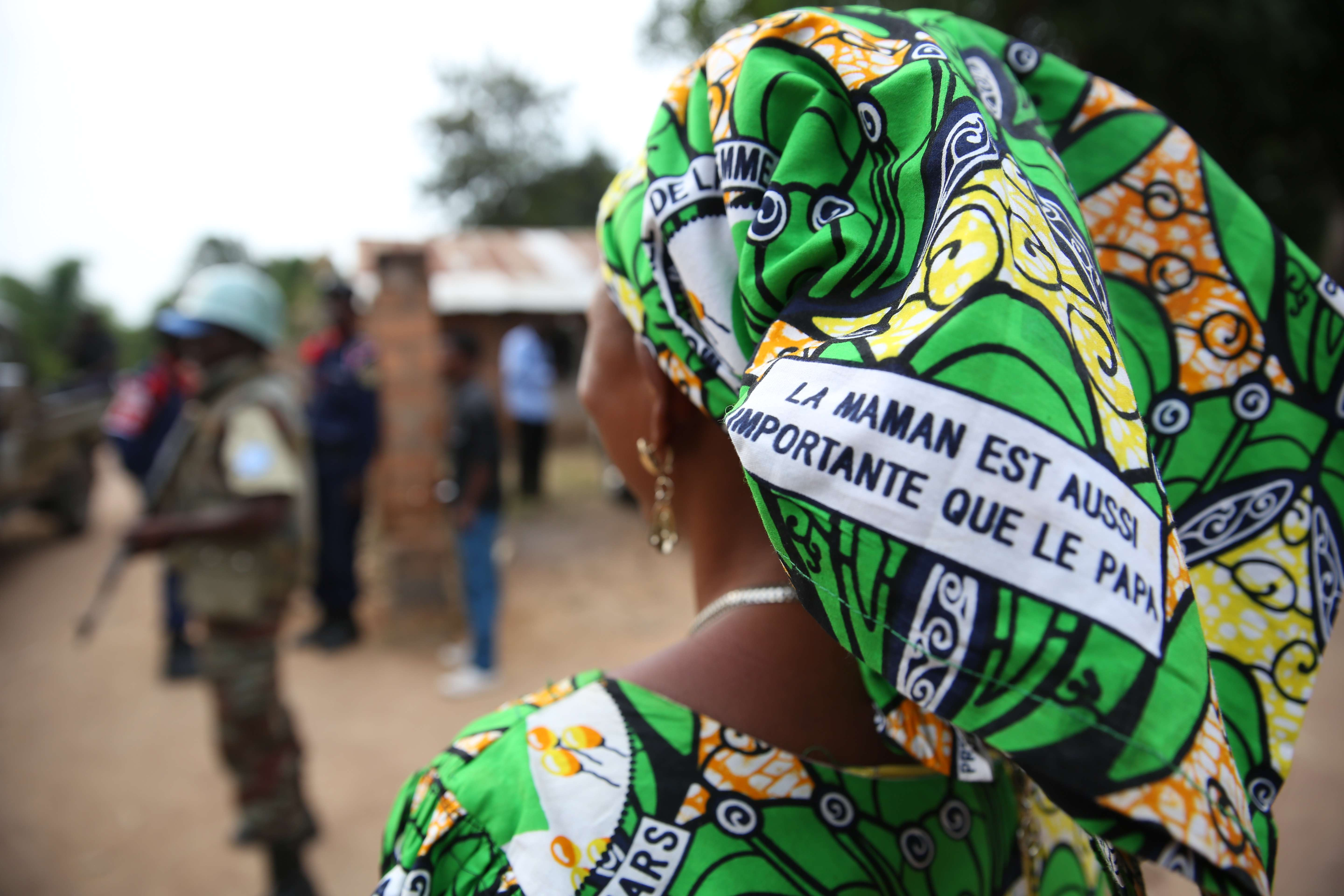
A Congolese woman asserts women's rights with the message 'The mother is as important as the father' printed on her pagne, 2015.

The culture, evolution, and history of women who were born in, live in, and are from the continent of Africa reflect the evolution and history of the African continent itself. Numerous short studies regarding women's history in African nations have been conducted. Many studies focus on the historic roles and status of women in specific countries and regions, such as Egypt, Ethiopia, Morocco, Nigeria Lesotho, Malawi, and sub-Saharan Africa. Recently, scholars have begun to focus on the evolution of women's status throughout the history of Africa using less common sources, such as songs from Malawi, weaving techniques in Sokoto, and historical linguistics.

The status of women in Africa is varied across nations and regions. For example, Rwanda is the only country in the world where women hold more than half the seats in parliament — 51.9% as of July 2019, but Morocco only has one female minister in its cabinet. Significant efforts towards gender equality have been made through the creation of the African Charter on Human and People's Rights, which encourages member states to end discrimination and violence against women. With the exception of Morocco and Burundi, all African states have adopted this charter. However, despite these strides towards equality, women still face various issues related to gender inequality, such as disproportionate levels of poverty and education, poor health and nutrition, lack of political power, limited workforce participation, gender-based violence, female genital mutilation, and child marriage.

== Historiography of African women ==
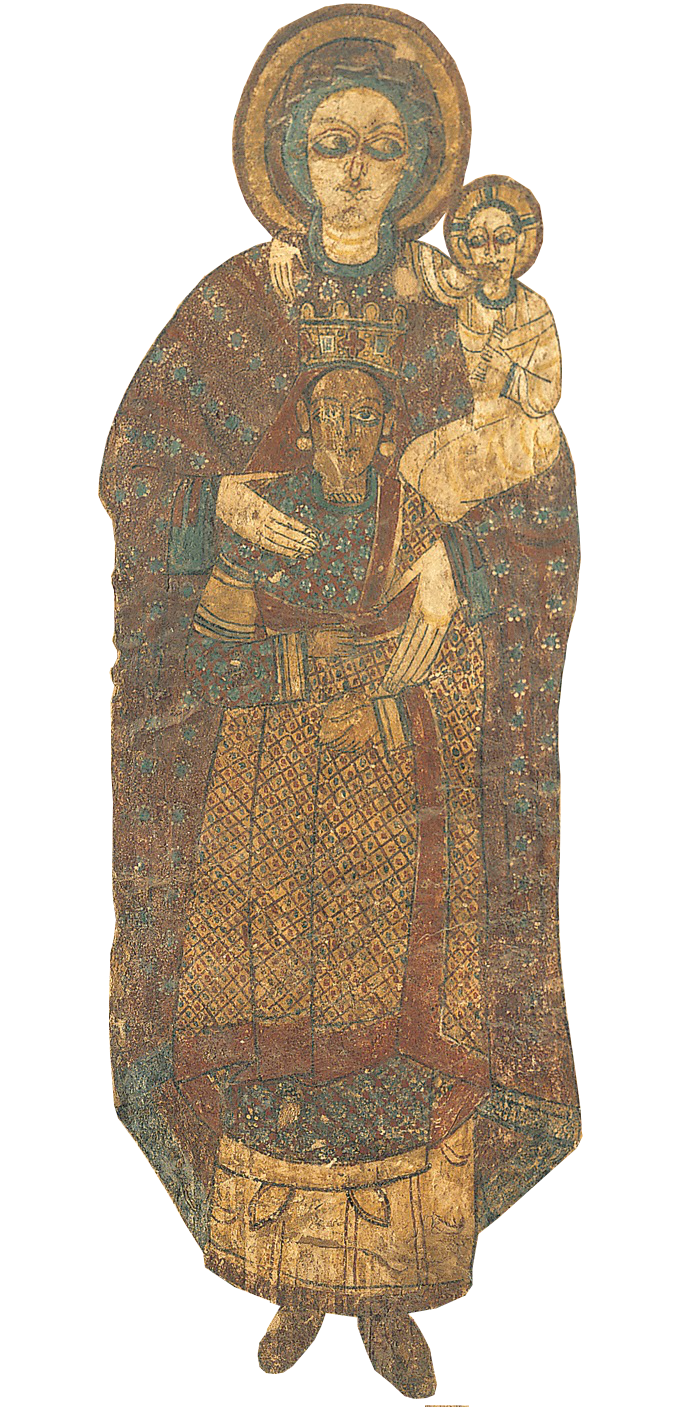
Mural of a Makurian noblewoman protected by Virgin Mary, 12th century

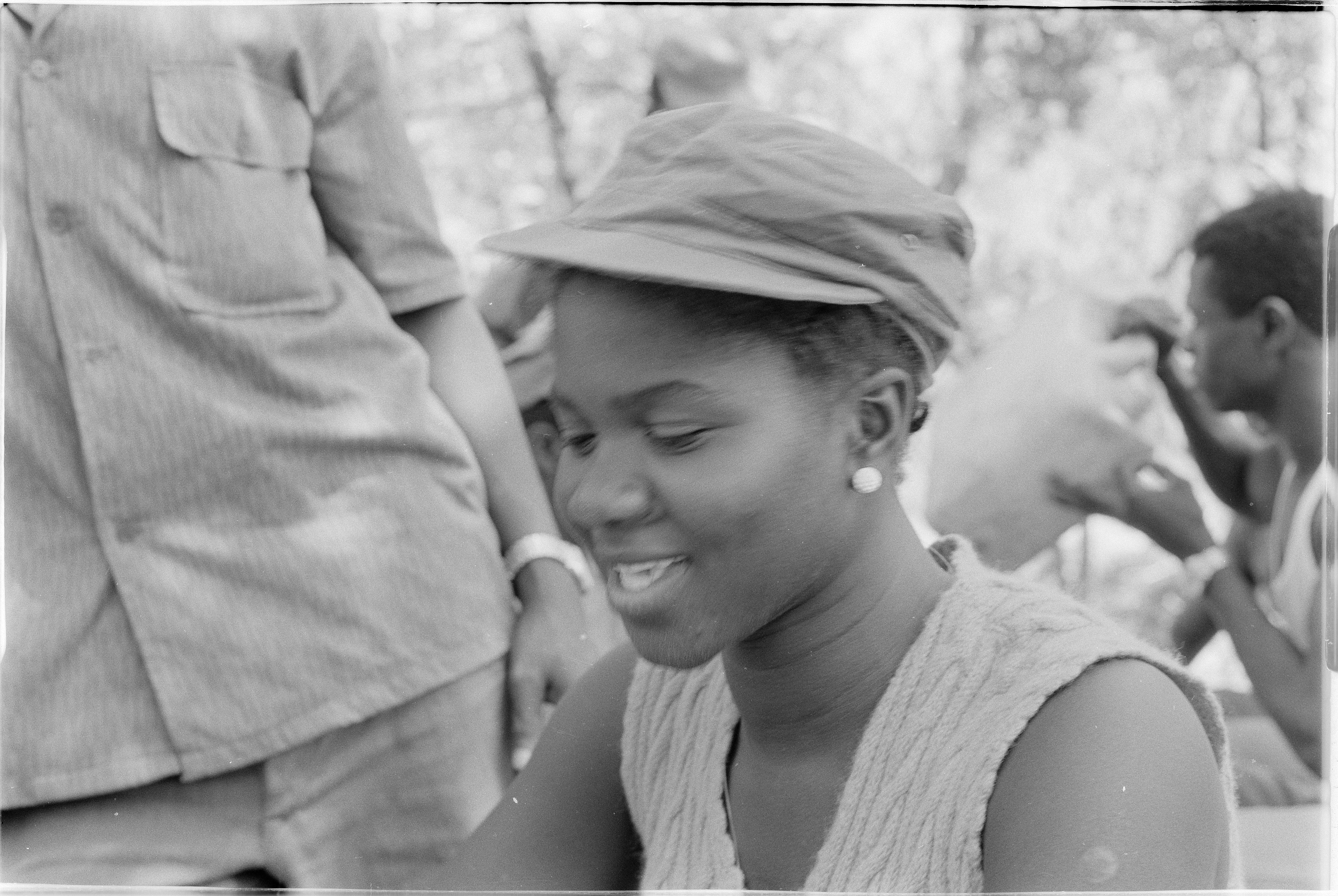
Female soldier of the PAIGC liberation army playing cards, Guinea-Bissau, 1973

The study of African women's history emerged as a field relatively soon after African history became a widely respected academic subject. Historians such as Jan Vansina and Walter Rodney forced Western academia to acknowledge the existence of precolonial African societies and states in the wake of the African independence movements of the 1960s, although they mainly focused on men's history. Ester Boserup, a scholar of historical economics, published her groundbreaking book, Women's Role in Economic Development, in 1970. This book illustrated the central role women had played in the history of Africa as economic producers and how those systems had been disrupted by colonialism.

By the 1980s, scholars had picked up threads of African women's history across the continent, for example, George Brooks' 1976 study of women traders in precolonial Senegal, Margaret Jean Hays' 1976 study of how economic change in colonial Kenya affected Luo women, and Kristin Mann's 1985 study on marriage in Nigeria. Over time, historians have debated the role and status of women in precolonial vs. colonial society, explored how women have dealt with changing forms of oppression, examined how phenomena like domesticity became gendered, unearthed women's roles in national struggles for independence, and even argued that the category of "woman" in some cases cannot be applied in precolonial contexts. Scholastique Dianzinga's study of women in pre-and-post-colonial Republic of Congo demonstrated their presence and significance. Women have been shown to be essential historical, economic and social actors in practically every region of Africa for centuries.

== Culture ==
=== In the home ===
From the 1940s until Morocco's declaration of independence from the tutelage of France in 1956, Moroccan women lived in family units that were "enclosed households" or harems. The tradition of the harem lifestyle for women gradually ended upon Morocco's independence from France in 1956.

Women in Southern Rhodesia in the 1940's and early 50's were not educated in Western domestic lifestyles. Women Clubs began to emerge where women aimed to educate one another on domestic living and hygiene. Helen Mangwende led the movement in Southern Rhodesia and founded the FAWC (Federation of African Women Clubs). This group had over 700 members in 1950.

The traditional division of labour in Senegal saw Senegalese women as responsible for household tasks such as cooking, cleaning, and childcare. They were also responsible for a large share of agricultural work, including weeding and harvesting for common crops such as rice. In recent decades, economic change and urbanization has led to many young men migrating to the cities like Dakar. Rural women have become increasingly involved in managing village forestry resources and operating millet and rice mills.

=== In society ===
Gender discrimination was solidified across the continent during the colonial era. In the pre-colonial period, women held chieftaincies in their own right, and some tribes even had traditions to pass dynastic rights to exclusively male titles to royal descendants through the matrilineal line (e.g., Asanteman, Balobedu, Ijawland, Wolof kingdoms).

Colonialism eroded the power of these chieftaincies and traditions, and reinforced what was by then an already ascendant patriarchy thereafter. This was met with fierce opposition, most famously in the case of the Abeokuta women's revolt in Nigeria.

Following independence, sovereign states solidified the gender norms and class structures inherited from their colonial predecessors, as both the first and second generations of African administrations failed to restore women's traditional powers. This led to more opposition, and over the course of the past couple of decades there has been a significant improvement in the situation.

Titled females throughout Africa's history include Fatim Beye, Ndoye Demba and Ndate Yalla Mbodj of Senegal, Moremi, Idia, Amina, Orompoto, Nana Asma'u and Efunroye Tinubu of Nigeria, Yaa Asantewaa of Ghana, Yennenga of Burkina Faso, Hangbe of Benin, Makeda, Zawditu and Embet Ilen of Ethiopia and Eritrea, Nandi of South Africa and Hatshepsut of Egypt.

All are hailed as inspirations for contemporary African women. Many of Africa's contemporary titled women are members of the African Queens and Women Cultural Leaders Network, a voluntary organization.

=== In literature ===
Notable African writers have focused in their work on issues specifically concerning women in Africa, including Nawal El Saadawi (in books such as Woman at Point Zero and The Hidden Face of Eve), Flora Nwapa (Efuru), Ama Ata Aidoo (Anowa, Changes: A Love Story), and Buchi Emecheta (The Bride Price, The Slave Girl, The Joys of Motherhood).

In East Africa, notable African women literature writers have continued to engender their work by focusing on issues specifically concerning women in Africa. Yvonne Adhiambo Owuor's novels Dust and The Dragonfly Sea (Kenya) explore history, memory, and identity. Jennifer Nansubuga Makumbi's novel Kintu (Uganda) celebrates Baganda history and oral tradition while Penina Muhando (Tanzania), a pioneer of Kiswahili theater who uses drama to address gender and social justice.

When African women writers use literature to address the challenges faced by women on the continent, they play a crucial role in transforming the narrative. Their works move women's experiences from the periphery to the center, creating spaces where women's perspectives can be seen and heard. These perspectives have the power to challenge traditional gender roles, expose inequalities, and offer counter-narratives that empower women and promote socioeconomic, political and religious change.

Through literature, African women's voices illuminate the complexities of gender and identity, contributing to a more balanced and authentic understanding of the lived realities of women in Africa.

As the saying goes, "If you are not at the table, you are on the menu." This adage underscores the importance of women empowering themselves, using literature as a tool to elevate their voices and participate in decision-making processes that directly shape their lives.

== Education ==
=== Sub-Saharan Africa ===
Although sub-Saharan African countries have made considerable strides in providing equal access to education for boys and girls, 23% of girls do not receive a primary education. Factors such as a girl's social class and mother's education heavily influence her ability to attain an education Without easy access to schools, mothers are often the first and perhaps only form of education that a girl may receive.

In Côte d'Ivoire, girls are 35 times more likely to attend secondary school if their father graduated from college. With 40% of girls getting married before the age of 18 in sub-Saharan Africa, girls are often forced to drop out of school to start families.

Early marriage reinforces the cultural belief that educating daughters is a waste of resources because parents will not receive any economic benefit once their daughter is married to another family. This leads to the phenomena known as son-preference where families will choose to send their sons to school rather than their daughters because of the economic benefit that could educated sons afford the family. In addition, girls that do attend school tend to attend schools that are of lower quality. Bad quality schools are characterized by their lack of course offerings and weak preparation for the workforce. Another issue in education systems is the segregation of school subjects by gender. Girls are more likely to take domestic science and biology courses, whereas boys are more likely to take mathematics, chemistry, engineering, and vocational training.

According to UNESCO Institute for Statistics, 58.8% of women are literate in 2018. However, literacy rates within sub-Saharan Africa vary a lot from Chad having a 14% female literacy rate in comparison to Seychelles 96%.

==== South Africa ====
According to Rowena Martineau's analysis on the educational disparities between men and women in South Africa, women have been historically overlooked within the education system.

Some barriers women face in receiving education is that their education is less prioritized than their brothers, sexual assault is a common fear and widespread occurrence, and the social pressures to become married and start a family all hinder women's opportunity to become educated.

Furthermore, women choose to study nursing and teaching above any other profession, which further excludes them from entering the higher-paying jobs in STEM, that also contributes to gender inequality.

==== Sierra Leone ====
Since the founding of Sierra Leone in 1787, the women in Sierra Leone have been a major influence in the political and economic development of the nation.

They have also played an important role in the education system, founding schools and colleges, with some such as Hannah Benka-Coker being honored with the erection of a statue for her contributions and Lati Hyde-Forster, first woman to graduate from Fourah Bay College being honored with a doctor of civil laws degree by the University of Sierra Leone.

==== Angola ====
Angola has a high illiteracy rate among women, despite the commitment of the country to the empowerment of women and girls and to gender equality. Primary education in Angola is free, and enrollment rates for girls have increased in recent years. However, as in many other Sub-Saharan African countries, several challenges limit the full access to education for women and girls.

These include entrenched gender norms that prioritize domestic roles over schooling, high rates of early marriage and teenage pregnancy, and persistent poverty, which can restrict the abilities of families to support education. In addition, inadequate school infrastructure, particularly in rural and conflict-affected regions, further hinders access to education for women and girls.

In Angola, groups like the Organization of Angolan Women were founded in order to provide easier access to education and voting ability. The organization also advocated the passing of anti-discrimination and literacy laws.

==== Kenya ====
The literacy rates of Kenyan women has improved significantly over the past decades. When women are educated, it empowers the community. The innate African motherly instinct has seen Kenyan women support each other to get education through initiatives like Chama cha wamama (Merry-go-rounds) at grassroots levels. Many Kenya women believe that through education, it is possible to mitigate poverty and gender disparity.

The introduction of free primary education by the late Mwai Kibaki, the third president of Kenya, positively influenced women's literacy rates. Many girls from poor families and marginalized areas have been able to access education. Kenya has also continued to emphasize on the importance of investing in girls' education and gender equity.

According to recent statistics, female literacy now stands at over 80%, a sharp increase from the post-independence era when educational access for women was severely limited. Affirmative action policies, free primary education, and targeted scholarship programs have contributed to this growth.

Notable Kenyan women exemplify these gains, Professor Olive Mugenda, the first female Vice-Chancellor of Kenyatta University, has championed academic excellence and institutional growth, while Dr. Jemimah Kariuki, an award-winning public health advocate and medical doctor, has used her education to lead innovative maternal health programs.

Kakenya Ntaiya founded the Kakenya Center for Excellence to champion for the education and rights of girls and women in Maasai community. These examples illustrate how increased access to education has empowered women to influence national development.

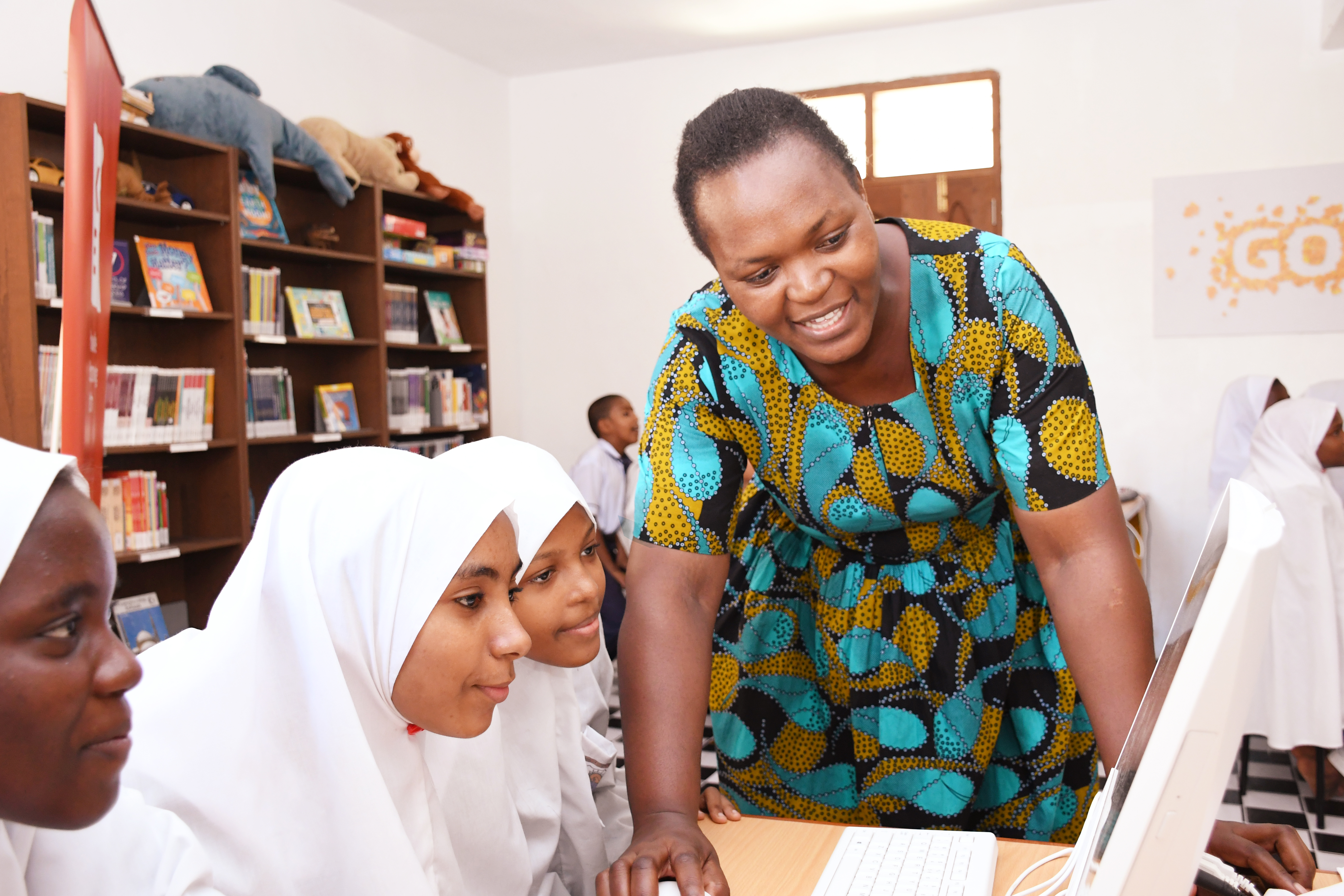
A teacher at Shela Primary School-Lamu County, Kenya empowering students with digital skills.

Even though Kenya has made significant progress on equal access to education, barriers persist in women's access to quality education. Socio-cultural norms in some communities still prioritize early marriage over schooling, limiting girls' chances of completing secondary and higher education.

=== North Africa ===
The seven countries—Algeria, Egypt, Libya, Morocco, Sudan, Tunisia, and Western Sahara—that make up North Africa have unique educational environments because of their relative wealth and strong Islamic faith.

Gender norms and roles are very strictly defined to protect women's honor and modesty, which have inadvertently become barriers to women receiving equal education as men as women are expected to stay at home and raise a family.

These gender expectations devalue women's education and bar girls access to education. As a result, North African countries such as Egypt and Morocco have higher illiteracy rates for women than other countries with similar GDPs. Similar to sub-Saharan Africa, women are disproportionately over-represented in the professions of teaching, medicine, and social welfare. Gender stereotypes are further reinforced by the fact that only 20% of women are part of the labor force.

This creates a negative cycle wherein women are expected to stay at home, barring them from further educational opportunities, and creating barriers for women to gain the education and skills necessary to find gainful employment.

==== Morocco ====
Morocco's female literacy rate is 65%, which is still significantly lower than North Africa's female literacy rate of 73%. Moroccan women live under a strong framework of acceptable gender roles and expectations. Agnaou's study in 2004 found that for 40% of illiterate women, the greatest obstacle for women to become literate were their parents.

Due to societal views of "literacy" and "education" as masculine, there is no strong policy push to educate women in Morocco. There have been various literacy campaigns run by the government such as the creation of the Adult Literacy Directorate in 1997 and the National Education and Training Charter. These literacy campaigns have had varying success in reducing illiteracy due to limited funding, lack of human resources, and cultural inertia.

== Politics ==
=== North Africa ===
==== Algeria ====
Algeria is regarded as a relatively liberal nation and the status of women reflects this. Unlike other countries in the region, equality for women is enshrined in Algerian laws and the constitution. They can vote and run for political positions. Even though Algeria is relatively progressive in the region, with constitutional guarantees of equality and women's rights to vote and hold office, this formal framework coexists with legal and cultural constraints that limit its impact. Amendments to the Family Code in 2005 and 2015 introduced protections against domestic violence and raised the marriage age. Nonetheless, it retained discriminatory provisions on polygamy, inheritance, and divorce.

Political representation has fluctuated sharply. Women held 31% of parliamentary seats in 2012. However, by 2021 only 8%, reflecting both structural setbacks and enduring societal resistance. Additionally, rising cases of Femicide weaved with weak enforcement of protective laws and scarce shelters for survivors, underscore the gap between legal ideals and lived realities.

Education and professional achievements, such as Algeria's high proportion of female engineering graduates, stand in tension with persistent patriarchal norms, revealing a nation where progress is tangible but uneven, and where activism remains essential to close the distance between rights on paper and equality in practice.

==== Libya ====
Since independence, Libyan leaders have been committed to improving the condition of women but within the framework of Arabic and Islamic values. Central to the revolution of 1969 was the empowerment of women, and removal of inferior status.

During the regime of Muammar al-Qaddafi, many Libyan leaders, expressed commitment to improve the conditions of women by promoting education, and increasing workforce participation. Even though the strategy of women empowerment was often framed within a conservative, male-dominated system and faced resistance, at the center of the 1969, revolution led by Muammar Gaddafi was the removal of women’s inferior social status. Policies introduced during his rule-expanded women’s access to education, employment, political participation, and organizations such as the General Women’s Federation, established to promote gender equality.

However, women’s representation in leadership remains limited, and traditional attitudes continue to shape gender roles.On a positive note, after the 2011 revolution, Libyan women became increasingly active in civil society and peace building efforts, despite ongoing political instability.

==== Niger ====
In Niger, many of the laws adopted by the government of Niger to protect the rights of Nigerian women are often based on Muslim beliefs. Unfortunately, this creates tension between religiously grounded legal provisions and international commitments to gender equality, leading to persistent gaps in women's access to education, autonomy, and equal opportunities.

The challenge lies in navigating respect for cultural and religious values while ensuring that these do not limit women's rights to education and full participation in public life.

==== Sahrawi Arab Democratic Republic ====
Women in the Sahrawi Arab Democratic Republic are women who were born in, who live in, or are from the Sahrawi Arab Democratic Republic (SADR) in the region of the Western Sahara. In Sahrawi society, women share responsibilities at every level of its community and social organization.

Article 41 of the Constitution of the Sahrawi Arab Democratic Republic ensures that the state will pursue "the promotion of women and [their] political, social and cultural participation, in the construction of society and the country's development".

=== West Africa ===
==== Benin ====
The state of the rights of women in Benin has improved markedly since the restoration of democracy and the ratification of the Constitution, and the passage of the Personal and Family Code in 2004, both of which overrode various traditional customs that systematically treated women unequally.

Still, inequality and discrimination persist. Polygamy and forced marriage are illegal but they still occur.

==== Nigeria ====
The freedom and right for women in Africa to participate in leadership and electoral processes differs by country and even ethnic groups within the same nation. For example, in Nigeria, women in Southern Nigeria had the right to vote as early as 1950 and contested for seats in the 1959 Nigerian elections, whereas women in Northern Nigeria could not vote or contest until 1976.

=== Central Africa ===
==== Democratic Republic of the Congo ====
Women in the Democratic Republic of the Congo have not attained a position of full equality with men, with their struggle continuing to this day. Although the Mobutu regime paid lip service to the important role of women in society, and although women enjoy some legal rights (e.g., the right to own property and the right to participate in the economic and political sectors), custom and legal constraints still limit their opportunities.

From 1939 to 1943, over 30% of adult Congolese women in Stanleyville (now Kisangani) were so registered. The taxes they paid constituted the second largest source of tax revenue for Stanleyville.

==== Rwanda ====
Claire Wallace, Christian Haerpfer and Pamela Abbott write that, in spite of Rwanda having the highest representation of women in parliament in the world, there are three major gender issues in Rwandan society: the workloads of women, access to education and gender-based violence.

They conclude that the attitudes to women in Rwanda's political institutions has not filtered through to the rest of Rwandan society, and that for men, but not women, there are generational differences when it comes to gender-based attitudes.

==== Other countries ====
In 2023, the European Investment Bank and the European Commission allocated €10 million to female African entrepreneurs and firms that provide services or generate excellent jobs for women in the bioeconomy.

This is accomplished through loan lines with Compagnie Financière Africaine COFINA in Côte d'Ivoire (focused on cocoa, cashews, and food crops), Senegal (for cereals and horticulture), and First Capital Bank Limited in Zambia to boost sustainable agricultural output.

=== East Africa ===
In East Africa, the participation of women in politics has expanded significantly over time. There is a significant shift from highly restricted roles during the colonial and early independence periods to broader representation today through electoral reforms, deliberate gender mainstreaming policies, and regional advocacy efforts.

This progress has been shaped by decades of activism, evolving legal frameworks, and changing cultural attitudes toward gender and leadership. Just like in many other African countries, women continue to take on influential political roles despite persistent structural, cultural, and institutional barriers.

==== Kenya ====
In Kenya, the participation of women in electoral politics has grown significantly in recent years. The 2022 general elections marked an important milestone, with an unprecedented number of women elected to public office across various levels of government.

This surge reflects broader national and regional efforts to strengthen gender inclusion, expand democratic spaces, and challenge long-standing cultural and institutional barriers that have historically limited women’s political representation. Women like Martha Karua and Charity Ngilu have been central to national politics and constitutional reforms.

The 2010 Kenyan Constitution introduced gender quotas aimed at expanding women’s representation. The 2010 Constitution set out a gender-balance provision, stipulating that neither gender may occupy more than two-thirds of positions within public sector. Even though the 2010 Constitution’s two-thirds gender rule has yet to be fully implemented at the national legislative level, Kenya has seen a steady rise in women elected to political offices, including Members of Parliament and Governors.

==== Tanzania ====
Women in Tanzanian politics have gradually gained representation and influence since the country’s independence in 1961, despite facing longstanding social, cultural, and institutional barriers. Pioneering figures have broken barriers in parliament and ministerial positions, paving the way for greater female political participation. Leaders like Samia Suluhu Hassan, who became the country’s first female president in 2021, illustrate growing female political leadership at the executive level.

==== Uganda ====
Uganda has not yet achieved gender parity in political representation at the local government level. Nonetheless, the participation of Ugandan women in public life has increased through legal reforms, political engagement, and economic initiatives. Long-serving female legislators and the introduction of affirmative-action seats for women since 1989 have further supported progress.

Across the region, women continue to influence political discourse, advocate for accountability, and challenge gender-based exclusion in governance.

==== Seychelles ====
Women in Seychelles enjoy the same legal, political, economic, and social rights as men. Seychellois society is essentially matriarchal. Mothers tend to be dominant in the household, controlling most current expenditures and looking after the interests of the children. Unwed mothers are the societal norm, and the law requires fathers to support their children. Men are important for their earning ability, but their domestic role is relatively peripheral. Older women can usually count on financial support from family members living at home or contributions from the earnings of grown-up children.

==== South Sudan ====
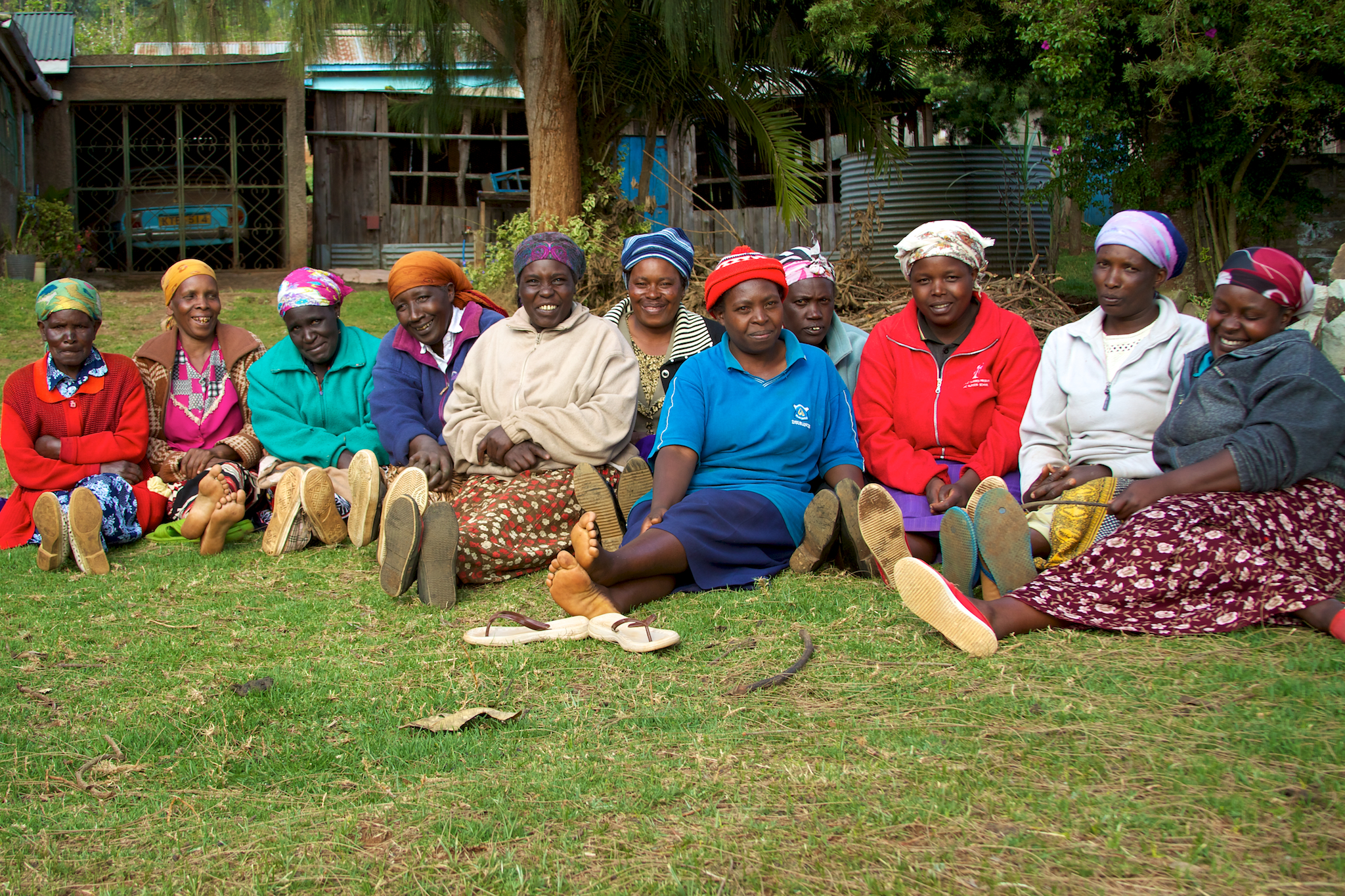
A group of women from Limuru in central Kenya, 2010.

The women of the Republic of South Sudan had also been active in liberation causes, by providing food and shelters to soldiers, caring for children and caring for wounded heroes and heroines during their political struggle prior to the country's independence. An example was their formation of the Katiba Banat or women's battalion.

==== Sudan ====
Sudan is a developing nation that faces many challenges in regards to gender inequality. Freedom House gave Sudan the lowest possible ranking among repressive regimes during 2012. South Sudan received a slightly higher rating but it was also rated as "not free". In the 2013 report of 2012 data, Sudan ranks 171st out of 186 countries on the Human Development Index (HDI).

Sudan also is one of very few countries that are not a signatory on the Convention on the Elimination of All Forms of Discrimination Against Women (CEDAW). Despite all of this, there have been positive changes in regards to gender equality in Sudan. As of 2012, women comprise 24.1% of the National Assembly of Sudan.

== The Status of Women in Africa ==
=== East Africa ===
==== Uganda ====
The roles of Ugandan women are clearly subordinate to those of men, despite the substantial economic and social responsibilities of women in Uganda's many traditional societies. Women are taught to accede to the wishes of their fathers, brothers, husbands, and sometimes other men as well, and to demonstrate their subordination to men in most areas of public life.

Even in the 1980s, women in rural areas of Buganda were expected to kneel when speaking to a man. At the same time, however, women shouldered the primary responsibilities for childcare and subsistence cultivation, and in the twentieth century, women have made substantial contributions to cash-crop agriculture.

== Workforce participation ==
Women in Africa are highly active whether that is within the sphere of formal or informal work. However, within the formal sphere, African women hold only 40% of formal jobs which has led to a labor gender gap of 54%. According to Bandara's analysis in 2015, this labor gender gap is equivalent to a US$255 billion loss in economic growth because women cannot fully contribute to economic growth.

In addition, women earn on average two-thirds of their male colleague's salaries. Some of the challenges African women face in finding formal work are their general lack of education and technical skills, weak protection against gender discriminatory hiring, and double burden of work with the expectation to continue housekeeping and childbearing.

Most of Africa's food is produced by women, but each female farmer produces significantly less food than male farmers because female farmers do not have access to the same land, fertilizers, technology, and credit to achieve maximum efficiency. For example, women in Ethiopia and Ghana produce 26% and 17% less food than their male counterparts as a result of resource inequality.

The Senegalese government's rural development agency aims to organize village women and involve them more actively in the development process. Women play a prominent role in village health committees and prenatal and postnatal programs. In urban areas, cultural change has led to women entering the labour market as office and retail clerks, domestic workers and unskilled workers in textile mills and tuna-canning factories. Non-governmental organizations are also active in promoting women's economic opportunities in Senegal. Micro-financing loans for women's businesses have improved the economic situation of many.

In May 2011, in Djibouti, Director of Gender for the Department of Women and Family Choukri Djibah launched the project SIHA (Strategic Initiative for the Horn of Africa), which is designed to support and reinforce the economic capacity of women in Djibouti, funded with a grant from the European Union of 28 Million Djibouti francs.

== Notable women ==
Ellen Johnson Sirleaf of Liberia was Africa's first woman president. Since Sirleaf's election to office, Joyce Banda of Malawi, Ameenah Gurib of Mauritius and Sahle-Work Zewde of Ethiopia have also risen to the presidencies of their respective countries.

Some other political leaders (in no particular order) are Sylvie Kinigi of Burundi, Luisa Diogo of Mozambique, Agathe Uwilingiyimana of Rwanda, Maria das Neves of Sao Tome and Principe, Aminata Toure of Senegal and Saara Kuugongelwa of Namibia. Each has held the office of prime minister of her country.

In addition to political leaders, African nations boast many female artists, writers, and activists.

For example: Sao Tome and Principe's lyricist of the national anthem and renowned writer, Alda do Espírito Santo; South African singer and apartheid activist, Miriam Makeba; Nigerian novelist and speaker, Chimamanda Ngozi Adichie; Ethiopian entrepreneur of SoleRebels, Bethlehem Alemu; Nigerien architect, Mariam Issoufou; and environmental activist, Wanjira Mathai; Nigerian US-based philanthropist Efe Ukala; Nigerian Architect creative entrepreneur, public speaker and author Tosin Oshinowo. In Kenya Wamuyu Gakuru played a role in the Mau Mau rebellion as a fighter for Kenyan independence.

Namibia made history in 2025 as the first African country to have women in the three top political positions of the country with Netumbo Nandi-Ndaitwah as the President, Lucia Witbooi as the Vice President and Saara Kuugongelwa as Speaker, National Assembly.

== Gender-based violence ==
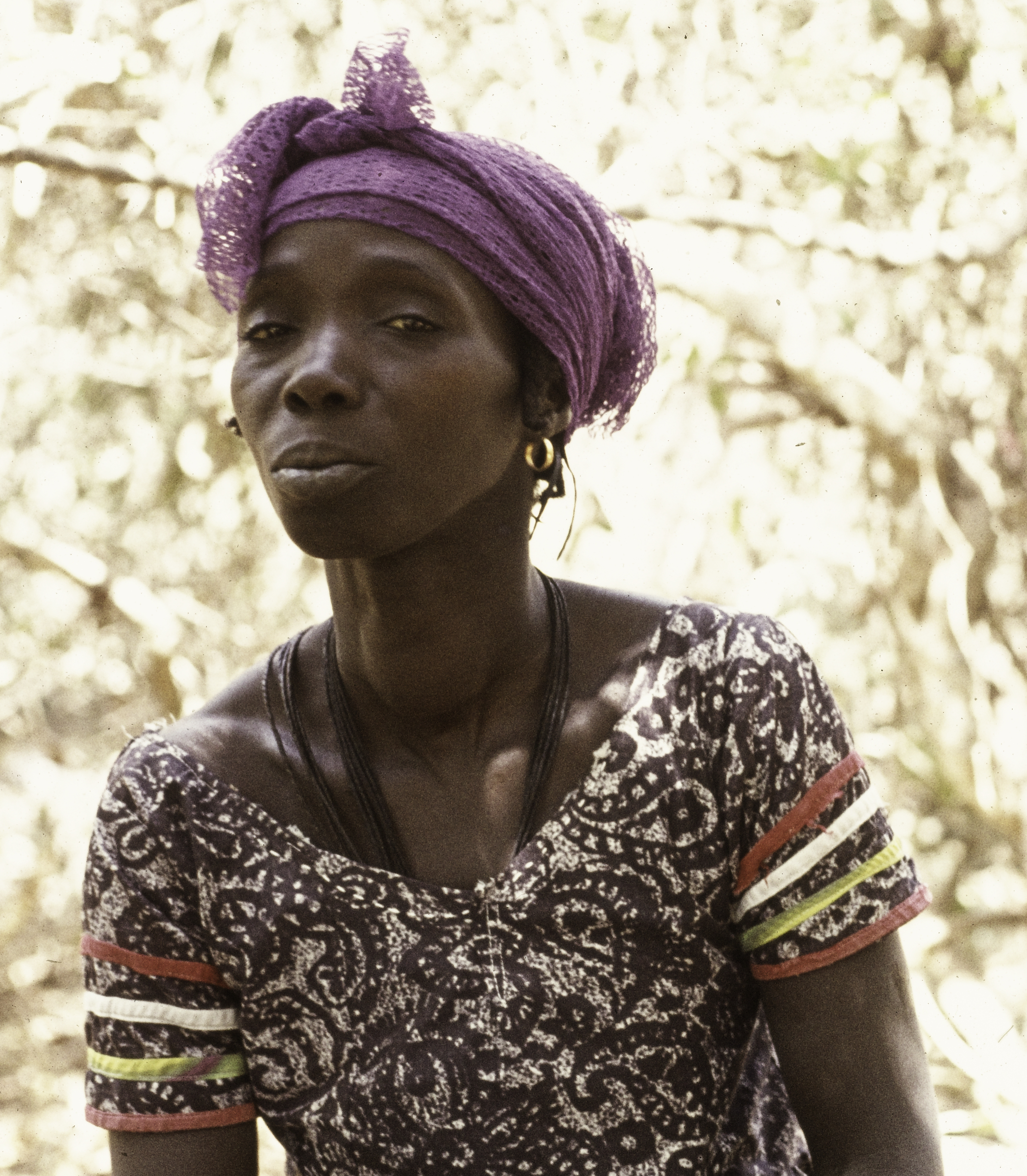
Woman from liberated Guinea-Bissau, 1974

The 2003 Maputo Protocol of the African Union addressed gender-based violence against women, defined as meaning "all acts perpetrated against women which cause or could cause them physical, sexual, psychological, and economic harm, including the threat to take such acts; or to undertake the imposition of arbitrary restrictions on or deprivation of fundamental freedoms in private or public life in peace time and during situations of armed conflicts or of war...".

=== Legal protections for sexual assault ===
In Benin, enforcement of the law against rape, the punishment for which can be up to five years in prison, is hampered by corruption, ineffective police work, and fear of social stigma. Police incompetence results in most sexual offenses being reduced to misdemeanors. Domestic violence is widespread, with penalties of up to three years in prison, but women are reluctant to report cases and authorities are reluctant to intervene in what are generally considered private matters.

=== Female genital mutilation ===
In some African cultures, female genital mutilation is seen as traditional passage into womanhood and a way to purify a woman's body. There are four levels of female circumcision: Type 1 involves the complete removal of the clitoris, Type 2 goes beyond Type 1 and removes the labia minora as well, Type 3 stitches the vagina after a Type 2 procedure, and Type 4 is any mutilation of vaginal tissue. The procedure is very painful and often practiced without proper medical equipment and hygiene procedures leading to a high risk of infection and chronic pain. Female genital mutilation is practiced in Senegal, Mauritania, Mali, Nigeria, Niger, Chad, Egypt, Cameroon, Sudan, Ethiopia, Somalia, Kenya, Uganda, Central African Republic, Ghana, Togo, Benin, Burkina Faso, Sierra Leone among others.

=== Femicide ===
Femicide is broadly defined as the "intentional murder of women," which includes honor killings, dowry killings, sexual orientation hate crimes, and female infanticide. According to a 2013 study by Abrahams, South Africa has the fourth highest rate of female homicide with 12.9 per 100,000 women being murdered by intimate partners in South Africa annually. With a rate of 7.5/100,000 women, women in South Africa are four times more likely to be murdered with a gun than a woman in the United States.

== See also ==
- History of Africa
- Women's history
- Women and agriculture in Sub-Saharan Africa
- Women in Christianity
- Women in Islam
- African Women in Mathematics Association
- Daughters of Africa

=== North Africa ===
- Women in Algeria
- Women in Egypt
- Women in Libya
- Women in Morocco
- Women in Sudan
- Women in Tunisia
- Women in the Western Sahara

=== West Africa ===
- Women in Benin
- Women in Burkina Faso
- Women in Cape Verde
- Women in the Gambia
- Women in Ghana
- Women in Guinea
- Women in Guinea-Bissau
- Women in Ivory Coast
- Gender inequality in Liberia
- Women in Mali
- Women in Mauritania
- Women in Niger
- Women in Nigeria
- Women in Saint Helena
- Women in Senegal
- Women in Sierra Leone
- Women in Togo

=== Central Africa ===
- Women in Angola
- Women in Cameroon
- Women in the Central African Republic
- Women in Chad
- Women in the Republic of the Congo
- Women in the Democratic Republic of the Congo
- Women in Equatorial Guinea
- Women in Gabon
- Women in São Tomé and Príncipe

=== East Africa ===
- Women in Burundi
- Women in the Comoros
- Women in Djibouti
- Women in Eritrea
- Women in Ethiopia
- Women in Kenya
- Women in Madagascar
- Women in Mauritius
- Women in Mayotte
- Women in Réunion
- Women in Rwanda
- Women in Seychelles
- Women in Somalia
- Women in Somaliland
- Women in South Sudan
- Women in Tanzania
- Women in Uganda

=== Southern Africa ===
- Women in Botswana
- Women in Eswatini
- Women in Lesotho
- Women in Malawi
- Women in Mozambique
- Women in Namibia
- Women in South Africa
- Women in Zambia
- Women in Zimbabwe
