= Asha Ismail =

Kenyan human rights activist

- Born: 27 September 1986 (age 40)
- Known for: Anti-FGM Activism

Asha Ismail (born 27 September 1968) is a Kenyan human rights activist. She is the founder and president of Save a Girl, Save a Generation, an organisation whose mission is to end female genital mutilation, the dowry system, forced marriage and other abuses against women in Africa and Asia.

== Life and work ==
She war born in Garissa, Kenya in 1968. She experienced female genital mutilation at the age of 5 at what she had been told was a "purification" ceremony and feast. Her menstruation and the birth of her daughter was especially painful due to the damage that had been done, and she made it her life's goal to use education to wipe out the practice so that her daughter and other women would not experience it. In her village, there are women known as "Asha's girls" because she has saved them from genital mutilation. She moved to Spain in 2011, at which point she founded the non-governmental organisation Save a Girl, Save a Generation. Her daughter, Hayat Traspas, is also a member of the organisation which is headquartered in Madrid.

She was one of the activists profiled in the 2018 documentary La manzana de Eva ("The apple of Eve") by José Manuel Colón, which tells the stories of women in different countries who campaign against female genital mutilation. She was part of Amnesty International's 2017 Brave campaign which recognises human rights campaigners.

== Recognition ==
On March 8, 2017, on the occasion of International Women's Day, Ismail received the Atenea de Alcobendas award for defense of women's rights.

She attended, on October 12, 2019, the fifteenth anniversary of the Tierra de Hombres NGO where she was presented with a statuette made by the sculptor Julia Ares in recognition of her work. Also in October 2019 she received an award from the Periplo festival at the Puerto de la Cruz.

On January 24, 2020, the International Human Rights Foundation awarded Ismail the Nicolás Salmerón Prize for Human Rights in the category of 'Equality'.

On International Women's Day 2020, she received an award from the Community of Madrid which she rejected as incompatible with her work and her principles. She expressed gratitude for the award, but said the Madrid Government was an obstacle to feminism and was denying gender-based violence.
