= Women in Eritrea =

Throughout the history of Eritrea, women have played an active role in warfare and labor. Eritrea's religious demographic of being half Christian and half Muslim led to a highly conservative culture regarding the place of women in society. In contrast, women in Eritrea experienced remarkably high degrees of sociopolitical emancipation during independence. Eritrea's liberation movement included one of the highest rates of female participation in any national liberation movement. However, following independence, many of the advancements in gender equality in Eritrea experienced backsliding.

== Women during the War for Independence (1961-1991) ==
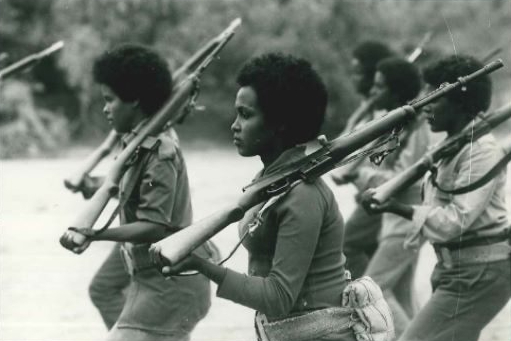
Women fighters in the EPLF

Eritrean women represented 30% of the Eritrean People's Liberation Front (EPLF) during the 30-year war for independence. Following pressure from Haile Selassie I on the Eritrean Assembly, the Federation of Ethiopia and Eritrea was officially dissolved and Eritrea was annexed by Ethiopia directly after on November 15th, 1962. By the end of war, women comprised about one third of the military force of 95,000 and women fighters would serve alongside men in every capacity rather than merely being auxiliary forces. This is a marked difference from the usual role of women in liberation movements — for example in Nicaragua and South Africa — where womens' involvement was seen as an extension of their domestic responsibilities.

Reforms by the EPLF were generally implemented from the top rather than being instituted by the women themselves. The EPLF's emphasis on the emancipation of women was motivated by its Marxist–Leninist ideology. The EPLF viewed patriarchal culture as undesirable and to be removed through cultural revolution due to its association with feudal culture and colonialism.

As a part of these progressive social changes, Eritrea experienced a growing acceptance of sexual liberation. In 1977, marriage reform law was instituted, which included the elimination of forced marriage, the outlawing payment of dowry and child marriage, and the destigmatization of non virgin brides. Initially, the EPLF took a more forbade sexual relationships in the army with the intent of protecting women. However, contraceptives were made available and premarital sex was encouraged. The EPLF described this new paradigm of marriage norms as "democratic marriage" (Silkin 1989:148) and as "marriages based solely on comradely love" (Eritrean Women's Association 1979:18).

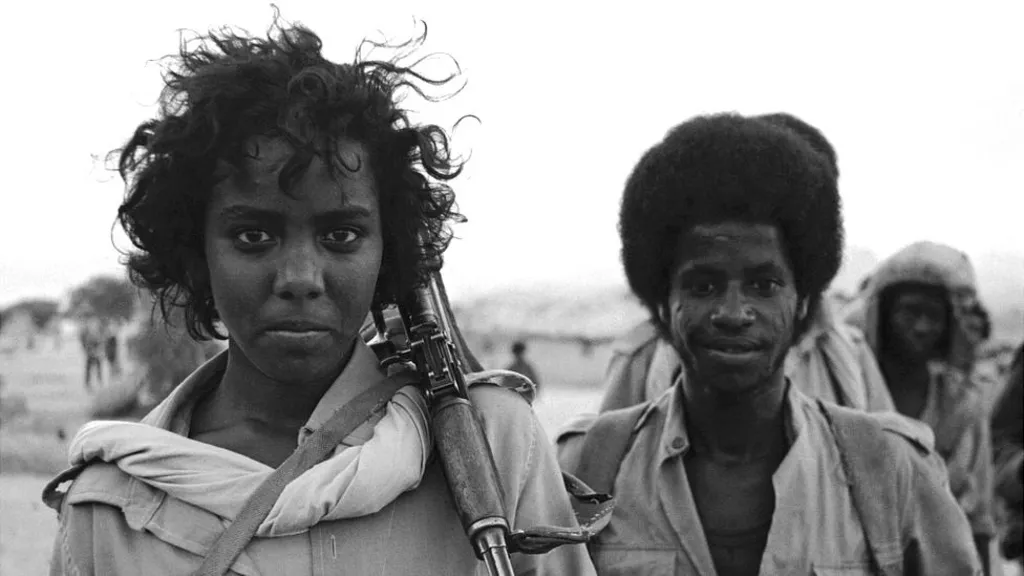
Mixed soldiers in the EPLF

Additionally, the domestic sphere and its associated gender roles were nearly eliminated. Domestic tasks such as cooking and gathering firewood were shared. According to Worku Zerai, one of the first women to be sent into combat, women were disproportionately assigned combat roles due to their lack of specialized training to participate in support roles. The feminine identity was largely erased: they were treated as men were in order to reduce the need for social restructuring. Therefore, the strides made in womens' emancipation did not persist after the war was over.

An ex-fighter states:

"I never knew myself as a woman. I thought of myself as a man. I faced the same problems as men."

Because womens' progressive roles in the liberation movement were not tied to their identity of women, they were expected to revert back to domesticity after the war.

Women in the EPLF exercised choice both in starting relationships and ending them which was not the norm in rural and traditional Eritrean society in the 1960s. EPLF fighters reported that divorce was easy, common and often initiated by the women during the War. What was usually regarded as scandalous promiscuity based on traditional ideas of purity and virginity, were tolerated in the Eritrean People's Liberation Front's liberated areas. The role of the female fighter during the 30 year War for Independence challenged normative gendered stereotypes and gender roles. Women in conflict are often solely perceived as victims, often suffering from rape and being portrayed as defenseless and inactive during these periods. These gendered portrayal of defenseless women in war were thoroughly deconstructed during the war, with the Eritrean women forces being at the forefront of this conflict. This opened up opportunities to reconstruct ‘given’ gendered stereotypes by directly challenging them.

== Division of labor ==
Eritrea is an agricultural subsistence society, both men and women work in agriculture and gendered divisions of labour exists in these practices. They depend on a regional agrarian system. Pastoralist and semi-pastoralist areas in the lowlands are dependent on livestock breeding. Women's role is centered on processing and preparing food as well as milking of goats and cows. In most areas farming is the mainstay, men and women work in the fields and share agricultural work in the communal land of Eritrea. In addition to this, women are involved in backyard gardening, poultry and beekeeping as well as weaving.

In most regions, women are responsible for most aspects of child care in their household. In the central highlands both men and women work in the fields. However ploughing remains a male practice, while hoeing and weeding is shared by both men and women. In some areas men and women produce the same crops but have separate fields, for subsistence and for sale. There are also separate tasks within the cropping cycle, with men planting cereals and fodder crops together with vegetables, while women plant some varieties of vegetables. In livestock production men tend the livestock, while women do the milking.

In Africa, women are assumed to perform 65% of the work for food production, in Eritrea the rate is 70% - 80%. Women also provide the labour for 80% of the food storage and transport from farm to the home, 90% of hoeing and weeding, and 60% of harvesting and marketing. Women also work in the fields of their husbands, weeding, hoeing, transporting and storing, while men plough women's field. Men do most of the fishing in the Red Sea while women make up 50% of the workforce in beach seining. Women also contribute to the harvesting of fisheries resources, such as catching small pelagic fish, collecting sea snails for the incense and perfume production in Yemen and other Arab countries.

Eritrean women work much longer hours than men, which is corroborated by numerous studies of gender roles and responsibilities, women in Eritrea reported that they commonly work up to 9 hours a day during the cropping season. In the field of education women represent 50 percent of all elementary school teachers in the country. Which is an even ratio from men to women. This number drops significantly to 10 percent for middle and secondary schools in Eritrea. This arises because women's secondary education is hindered by cultural expectation of raising a family at a young age and the prevalence of childhood marriages correlated with lower education levels. Many women stop schooling during their secondary education which prohibits them from having the educational requirements to teach the secondary level of school. Although this number is low, efforts are being made to increase this statistic and allow women more access to education while supporting their family. Women and men are paid equally for their jobs as elementary and secondary school teachers.

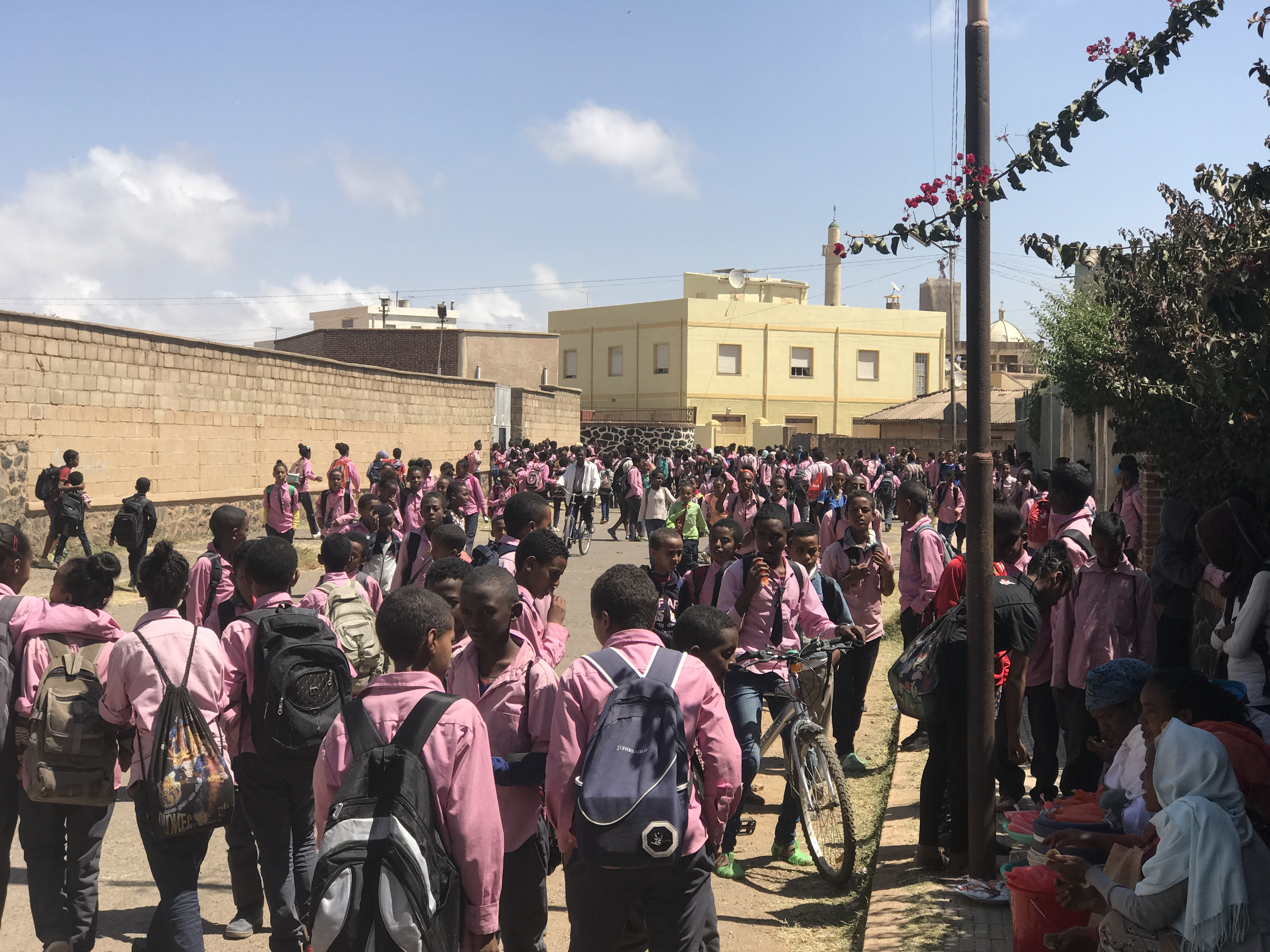
School in Asmara

=== Education ===
While the current government maintains a dedicated stance on girls’ education, the historical legacy of male and female education is difficult with certain cultural attitudes and practices still pervasive in Eritrean society. Many Eritrean women in isolated and rural areas are expected to work in agriculture and maintain domestic responsibilities in early adulthood. UNICEF reports only 43 percent of girls are enrolled in primary school education. While 50 percent of boys are enrolled. Enrollment in secondary school is much lower with about 25 percent of girls enrolled and 32 percent of boys. Although educational access decreases the literacy rates in Eritrea is high with women at 87.7 percent compared to men at 92.6 percent. The percent of women in education is steadily rising.

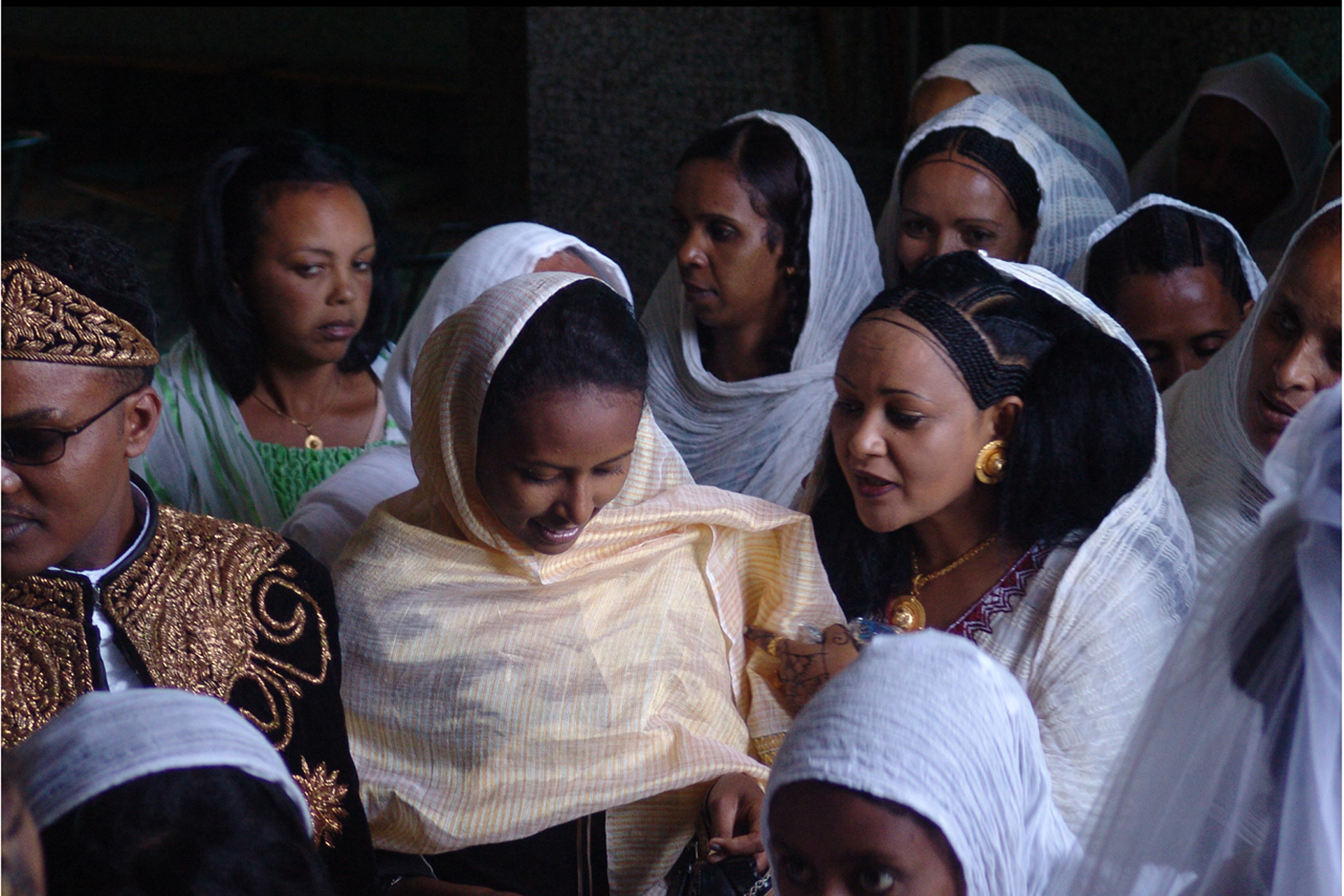
Women at Eritrean wedding

A decade ago, only 25 percent of university graduates were women. Today that number ranges between 40 and 50 percent, depending on the institution and the field of study. In Eritrea it is believed that early marriage secures more children. On the other hand, an unmarried female can be considered as a burden to the collective family and societal structure. Families in rural areas expect there daughters to get married early sometimes before the age of 18 years old. The average distance for elementary, middle and secondary school levels is contributing to the low education enrollment for women. At a national level, on average students are required to travel 5.3 km at elementary school level, 21.76 km at middle school level and 63.53 km at secondary school level. Schools are not close to students’ homes or villages and the average distance increases with the increase in the level of schooling (elementary school, middle school, secondary school). The reason for this is due to a lack of schools particularly middle and secondary schools being built in more remote areas of Eritrea.

An Eritrean girl must travel a long distance, or either, leave home to live in a rented house or with relatives outside the family village. This is hard for girls who are generally not allowed to travel long distances or rent houses in the urban areas to continue their education for safety reasons. Distance to the schools is a major barrier to girls education in Eritrea. Women represent about 50% of all teachers in elementary-level schools, and about 10% of all teachers at middle and secondary-level schools.

== Marriage ==
Almost 40 percent of women in Eritrea are married by their 21st birthday. Limited access to education is associated with the high prevalence of child marriage in Eritrea. 64% of women aged 20–24 with no education and 53% with primary education were married by 21 years old, compared to just 12% of women with secondary education or higher. UNICEF estimates that 4 in 10 women are married in childhood. The Eritrean Civil Code (articles 329 and 581) sets the minimum age of marriage at 18 years for both girls and boys although this is the case because of social norms women still get married at younger ages. This makes it difficult for women to pursue higher education because they are expected to work in subsistence agriculture and prepare food for their family at a young age. (Nolan White, All)

== See also ==
- Women in Africa
