= Women in Tanzania =

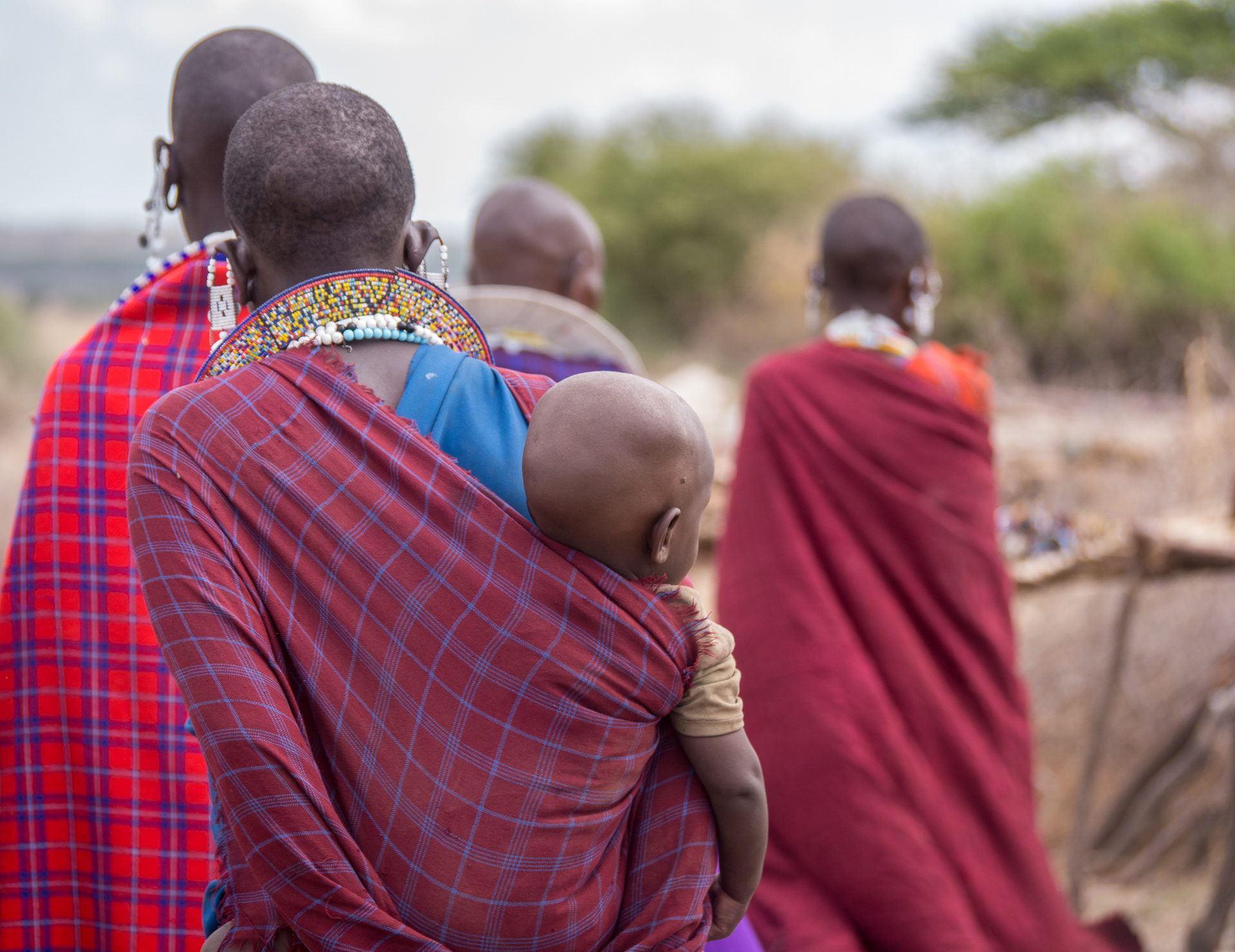
- Maasai women in Tanzania

General statistics
- Maternal mortality (per 100,000): 524 (2017)
- Women in parliament: 36.7% (2020)
- Women in labour force: 81.1

Gender Inequality Index
- Value: 0.560 (2021)
- Rank: 146th out of 191

Global Gender Gap Index
- Value: 0.719 (2022)
- Rank: 64th out of 146

Girls going to school using a bicycle

Roles, livelihoods, and the safety of women in Tanzania have improved since the 20th century. For instance Tanzania got Samia Suluhu Hassan as their first female president. There are still certain marital laws that favour Islamic and Christian traditions. But in modernised locales – like Dar es Salaam and Arusha –there are more upward mobility opportunities for women. Long-term visitors will notice a number of female business owners, middle managers and even security guards. Relatively high rates of gendered violence, as well as barriers to full legal rights and education, leave nevertheless room for improvement even though the average woman's experience in Tanzania is better.

== Gender roles ==
Status in Tanzanian society starts from birth and is highly gendered. Female babies are given a title, based on gender, instantly subjecting them to their social identity. Female's are hheekuuso'oo "child who will fetch water", while males are called hee sla/a or muk sla/a "child of the bush". The logic behind this tradition is that the female rite of passage is motherhood, therefore women must stay close to their household to avoid polluted climates and remain fertile.

However, in the 80s, women started to express destain for the weighting of tasks in their village – observing that they did more work than male villagers. In 2006, a local Tanzanian organization reiterated this belief with a survey. It was found that although both boys and girls did work on the farms side by side, girls would also cook, fetch water and continue household chores while boys would rest for the day and wait for food.

== Domestic differences ==
Traditionally, as young girls become wives, they get a portion of land from their husbands for the food production. On top of all the household duties, caring for the children and the elderly, the wives did all the weeding, planting and harvesting, while men were only needed to complete the heavy lifting. Anytime the husband leaves the home for an extended period of time to look for work, the wife had the full responsibility of tending the crops. Despite this, land was controlled almost entirely by the men and women had their economic autonomy limited to the selling of surplus crops.

The gendered violence women experience stems from the origins of the dynamic in marriage. With the popularity of polygamy and the trading women for goods and money (in the most rural parts of the country), they were perceived as objects. This culture left 21% of women claiming to have either experienced physical violence or threats of such acts – including sexual assault (usually at the hands of their spouse). Unfortunately, some of the laws that exist in Tanzania limit the ability for women to escape these abusive marriages.

== Legal rights and parliamentary representation ==
The nation's 1977 constitution guarantees women equal protection under the law and prohibits discrimination based on gender.

The 1971 Law of Marriage Act set the legal age for marriage at 15 for girls and 18 for boys. Though the intention behind this discrepancy was supposed to account for the difference in martial responsibilities between men and women, in 2016, a case to raise the legal age for girls to 18 was petitioned by Rebeca Gyumi, the founder and executive director of the msichana initiative – an NGO that advocates for the rights of women. With no legal recourse on the part of the opposition, the High Court directed the government to raise the legal age to 18 for girls, aligning the legal age for both genders. The government filed an appeal in 2019 but the High Court upheld their ruling. Tanzania does not maintain official statistics on child marriage, but human rights organizations estimate that the country still has one of the highest rates of child marriages in the world.

The Tanzanian Sexual Offences Special Provisions Act explicitly excludes marital rape as a criminal offence.

On a more positive note – In 1985, Tanzania was one of the first countries to establish a women's quota for parliament and the number of reserved-seats and female members of parliament has steadily increased since. Female members of parliament are elected indirectly: political parties provide a list with their female candidates to the Electoral Commission before the elections and the distribution of the reserved-seats is carried out proportionally between all parties that gain more than 5% of the popular vote.This quota-system was not intended to be established permanently and female politicians can switch from a reserved-seat to a constituency seat in subsequent elections. In all the past elections however, the number of women gaining a constituency seat has been significantly lower than the number of women who gained a reserved-seat.

On 19 March 2021, Samia Suluhu Hassan became the first female president of Tanzania.

== See also ==
Human rights in Tanzania

- Women in Africa
