= Women in Angola =

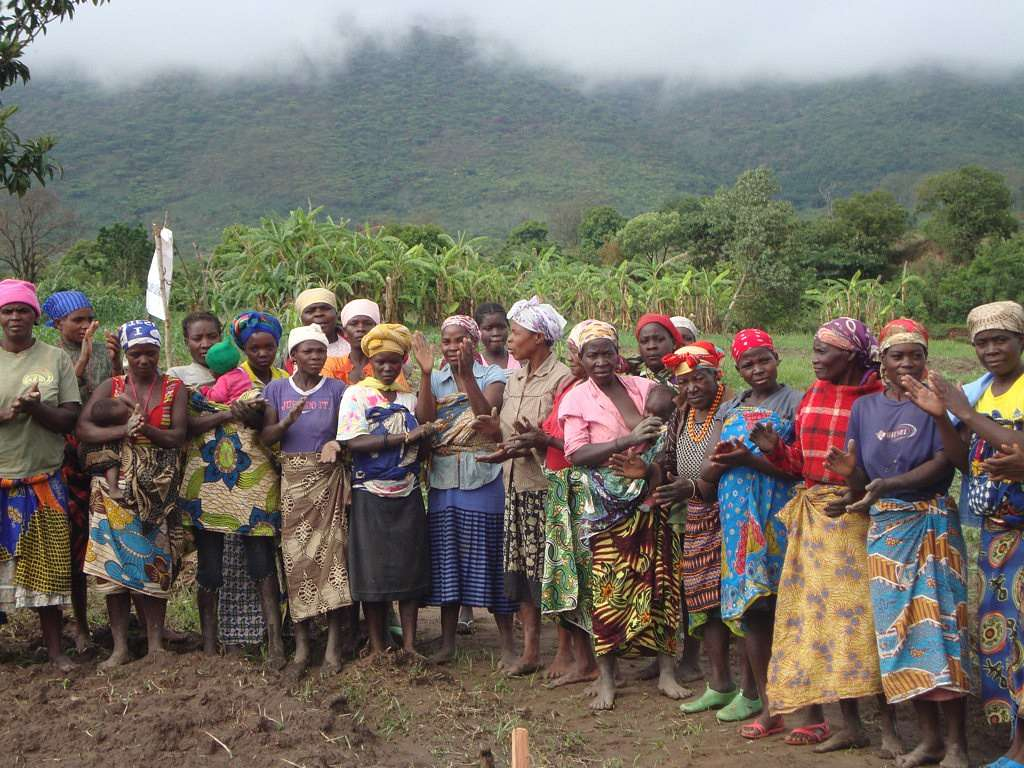
- Angolan Women 2014

Gender Inequality Index
- Value: 0.537 (2021)
- Rank: 136th out of 191

Global Gender Gap Index
- Value: 0.668 (2025)
- Rank: 117th out of 148

Women in Angola face significant societal barriers regarding equal pay, physical and sexual safety, and access to assets. Progress has been made to improve the gender equality and in 2024, 38.6% of seats in the Angolan National Assembly were held by women. Still, Angola lacks data on key as only 36% of indicators needed to monitor the SDGs from a gender perspective are available.

In rural Angola, as in many African economies, most of the population engaged in agricultural activities. Women performed much of the agricultural labor. Marriage generally involved familial, political, and economic interests as well as personal considerations and gains. The household was the most important unit of production and was usually composed of several generations. The women grew and prepared most of the food for the household and performed all other domestic work. Because of their major role in food production, women shared relatively equal status with men, who spent much of their time hunting or tending cattle.

== Health ==
It has been calculated that almost 25 million adults and children were living with HIV in sub-Saharan Africa at the end of 2005. During 2005, an estimated two million AIDS-related deaths occurred in Africa, leaving

behind some twelve million orphans. A study of nearly 2000 individuals in 2005 shows that intervention programs that promote condom use are very effective in reducing this number, by addressing common myths surrounding birth control. Separate

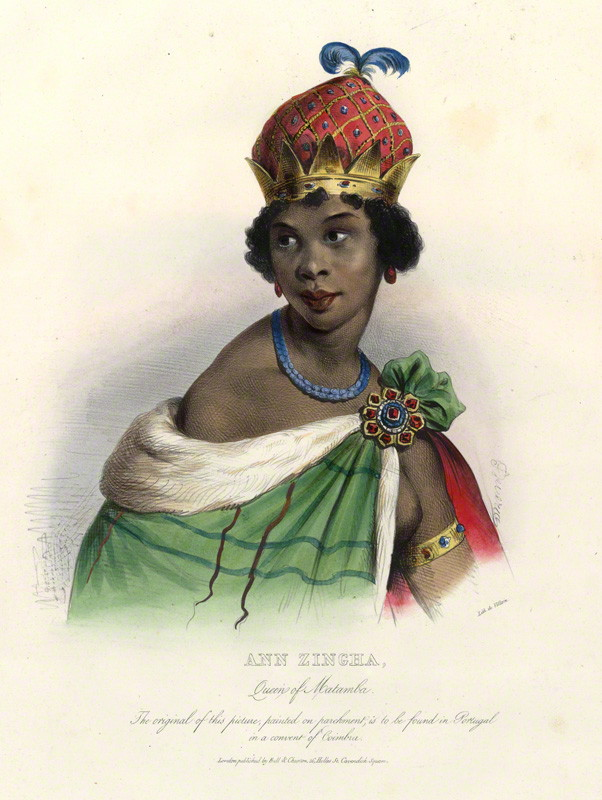
Nzinga Mbande, queen of the Ambundu Kingdoms of Ndongo (1624–1663) and Matamba (1631–1663), located in present-day northern Angola

studies have shown that HIV positive pregnant women have much worse mental health than those who don't and that two-thirds of this same group had severe mental distress.

Angola has a high breast cancer mortality rate, which has been attributed to a lack of symptom awareness that leads to a late diagnosis. In a survey of 595 students in university, around 65% were not aware that breast cancer was one of the deadliest cancers in Sub-Saharan Africa, and less than 35% knew that it could also affect men. Progress is being made to use universities as well as popular social media networks (Facebook, Twitter) to further teach students about awareness and self-examinations, which students also admitted that they were not familiar with.

== Legal rights and parliamentary representation ==
In 2024, 30.3% of women aged 20–24 years old who were married or in a union before age 18. The adolescent birth rate is 162.7 per 1,000 women aged 15-19 as of 2014, up from 10.64 per 1,000 in 2013.

Many women belonged to the Organization of Angolan Women (Organização da Mulher Angolana—OMA). Before independence, the OMA was instrumental in mobilizing political support for the MPLA among thousands of Angolan refugees, through leaders such as Rodeth Gil. After independence, and especially after the creation of the MPLA-PT in 1977, the mass organizations came under the strict control of the party and were given the role of intermediaries between the MPLA-PT and the population. Women's participation in the government has not increased at the rate that participation in other countries with similar political environments have, but women-friendly policies have still been enacted since the 1980s. As stated in the Quota Project of 2012, the National Assembly (Angola) consisted of 26.9% women, and the number of female justices in Constitutional Court of Angola was 4 out of 11. Angolan media is also to blame for the gender-stereotyped roles present in current day Angola. One example of this can be found the highly publicized Miss Angola program, endorsed by many provinces of Angola who spend large sums of money promoting the event.

Another program of which the Angolan government created in order to elevate women's status is the Ministry for Family and Women, a group that helped separate women's issues from the political agenda. However, even with new programs like these, little progress has been made to institutionalize proper programs to reform issues such as voting rates and pregnancy awareness. The Ministry for Family and Women continues to be one of the most underfunded programs in Angola, giving it little room to expand or produce tangible results.

In 1987, the OMA had a membership of 1.3 million women, most of whom lived in rural areas. Among the many contributions of OMA's members were the establishment of literacy programs and service in health and social service organizations. Most OMA members, however, were poor and unemployed. In 1988 only 10 percent of MPLA-PT members were women, although more women found jobs in teaching and professions where they had been excluded in the past.

== Gallery ==
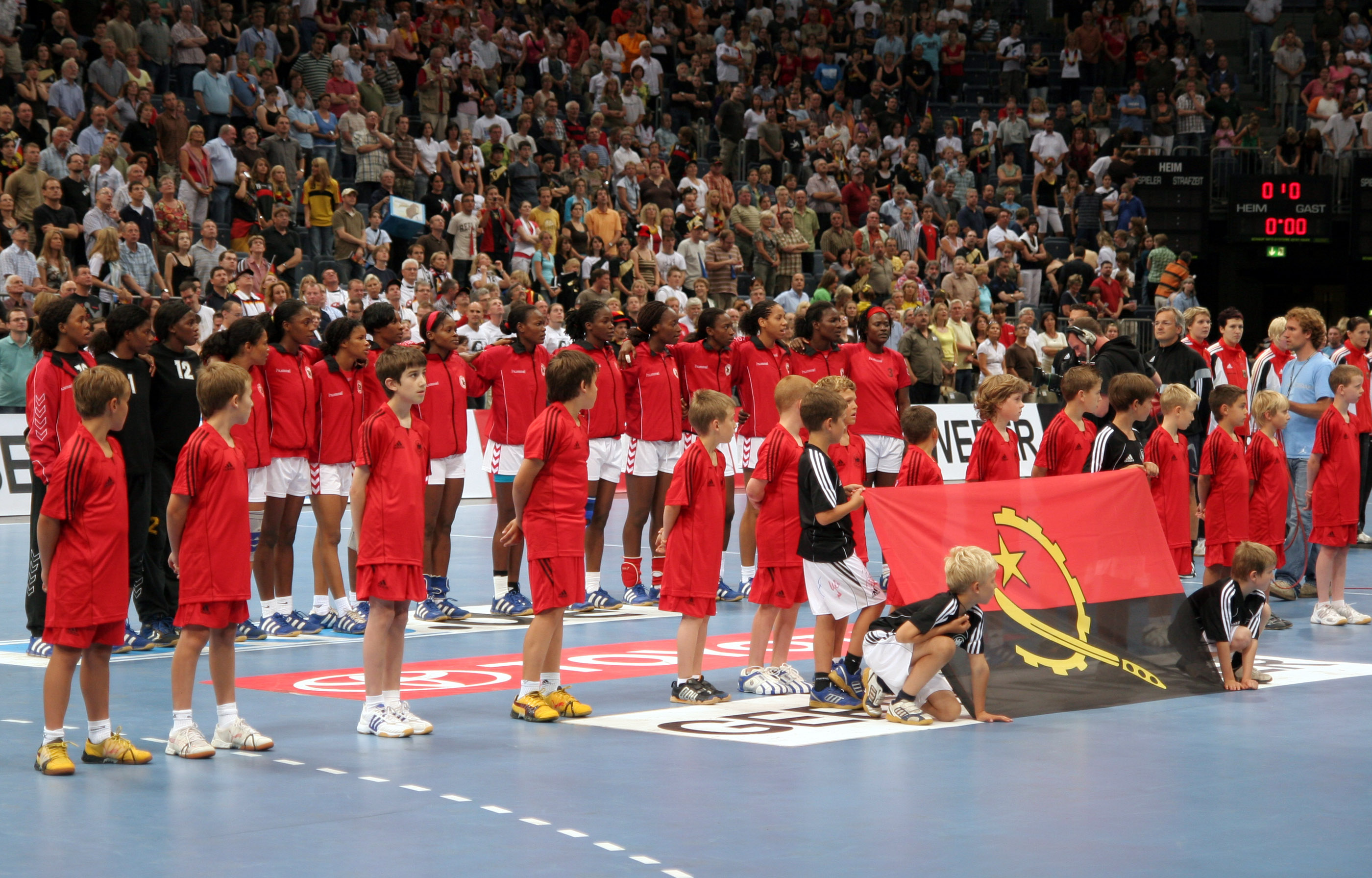
Angolian national handball team prior the cap against Germany, July 26th 2008

== See also ==
- Women in Africa
