= Women in Namibia =

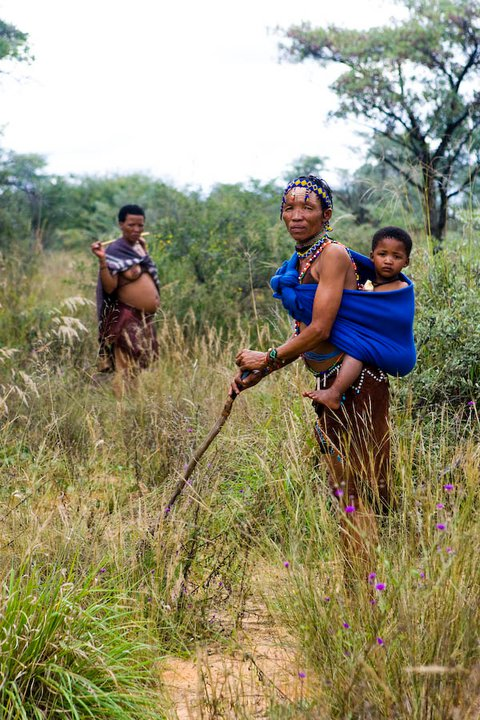

General statistics
- Maternal mortality (per 100,000): 195 (2017)
- Women in parliament: 44.2% (2021)
- Women over 25 with secondary education: 39.9%
- Women in labour force: 58.5% (2017)

Gender Inequality Index
- Value: 0.445 (2021)
- Rank: 111st out of 191

Global Gender Gap Index
- Value: 0.807 (2022)
- Rank: 8th out of 146

Women in Namibia face challenges in their health, gender based violence, and access to education. The government of Namibia is taking steps to provide women with equal rights to a degree that is largely unparalleled in Sub-Saharan Africa, including the promise of gender equality and increased parliament representation in the Namibian constitution. Women currently serve in nearly half of all seats in parliament and the first female Prime Minister was elected in 2015. The country's first female president, Netumbo Nandi-Ndaitwah, was elected in 2024. In addition, the country's first female speaker was elected in 2025. Namibia currently has a female president, vice president, and speaker.

== Health ==
HIV/AIDS is largely prevalent within Namibia. HIV-related deaths reached its peak in 2004, when 12,000 people died, but has since declined to around 2,900 deaths in 2021.

The socioeconomic status of women remains a significant indicator of HIV status. Of the poorest women in Namibia, the HIV prevalence rate is at 21.4%, compared to the richest households with an HIV prevalence rate of 3.7%.

Large strides have been made in the last decade to decrease the rate of maternal mortality in Namibia. In 2017, maternal mortality was at a rate of 195 deaths per 100,000 live births, down from 358 deaths per 100,000 live births in 2004. Life expectancy of women in Namibia has also improved. In 2020, the female life expectancy was 67 years, a large gap from 53 years in 2004.

== Domestic violence ==
The nation's 1990 constitution guarantees women equal protection under law and prohibits gender discrimination. Although unprecedented for its time, there is much to be done to close the gender gap between men and women in Namibia.

Domestic violence remains a large concern in Namibia. On average 26.7% of Namibian women between ages 15–49 have experienced domestic and/or sexual violence at least once, with 52% of these women aged 15–19.

Namibia outlawed marital rape in 2000.

== Legal rights and parliamentary representation ==
The nation's 1990 constitution guarantees women equal protection under law and prohibits gender discrimination.

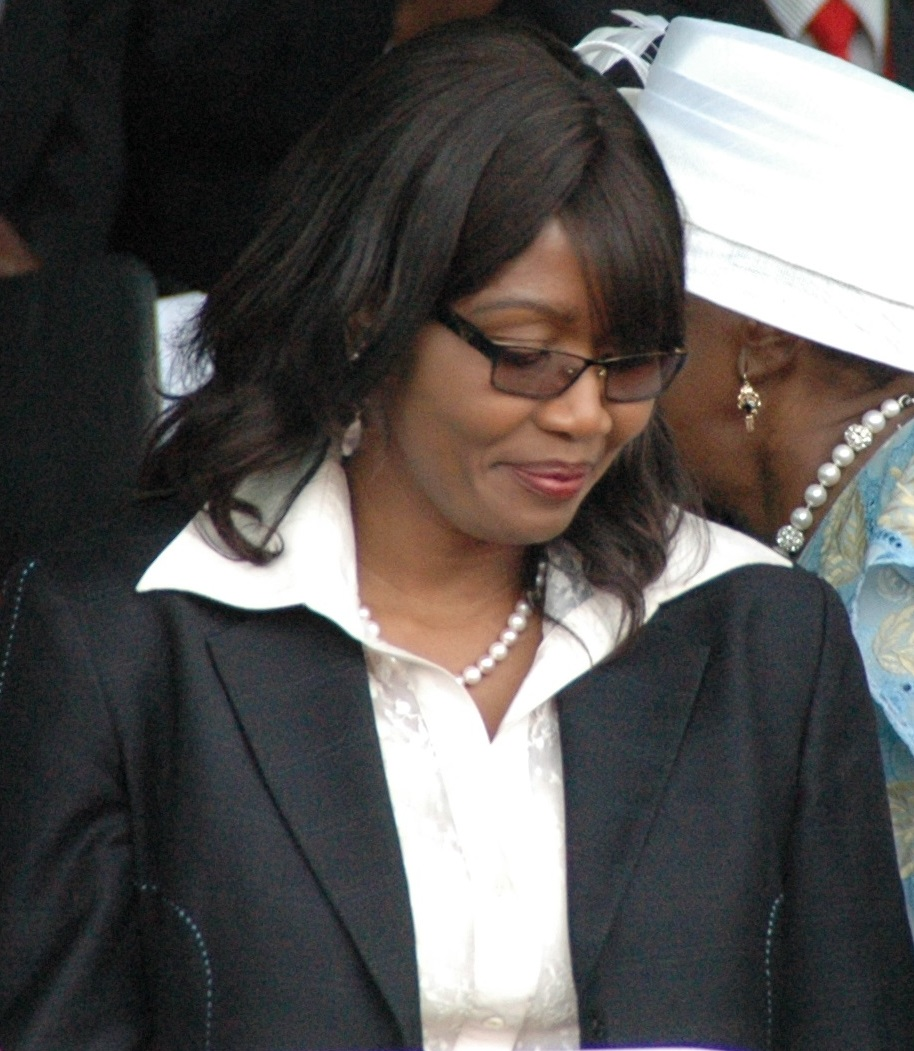
Saara Kuugongelwa, the current and first female Prime Minister of Namibia

Within the past decade, Namibia has seen increased pushes for the representation of women in parliament. In 2004, women constituted 29% of all parliament members, placing Namibia at seventeenth in the world for female representation in parliament. In 2014, the South West Africa People's Organisation introduced a policy committing to filling half of its seats in parliament with women, in addition to a "zebra" system in which a male prime minister would have a female deputy minister and vice versa. As of 2021, 44% of the Namibian parliament has seats filled by women.

In March 2015, Saara Kuugongelwa was appointed as Prime Minister of Namibia, making her the first woman to serve as Namibian Prime Minister. Netumbo Nandi-Ndaitwah became Namibia's first female vice president in 2024, and became the country's president in 2025. Lucia Witbooi is currently vice president, and Saara Kuugongelwa is the country's first female speaker of the National Assembly.

== See also ==
- Women in Africa
