= Women in Botswana =

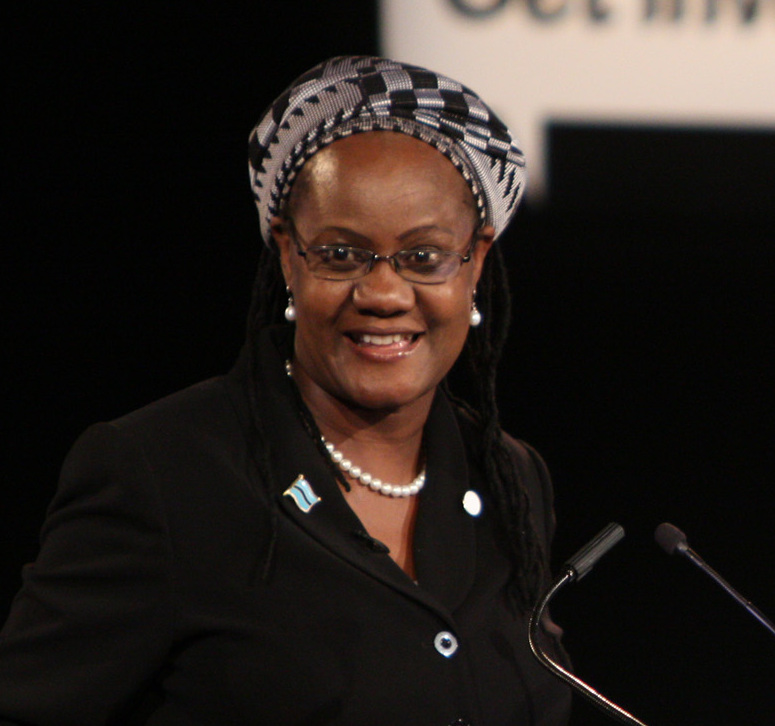
- Athalia Molokomme, the first woman to hold the office of attorney general.

Gender Inequality Index (2022)
- Value: 0.730
- Rank: 120 out of 166

Global Gender Gap Index (2024)
- Value: 0.730
- Rank: 57 out of 146

The political representation of women in Botswana has fallen behind neighbouring countries.

== History ==
The Abolition of Marital Power Act 2004 provided equal power for women in a common-law marriage.

== See also ==
- Women in Africa
