= Women in the Comoros =

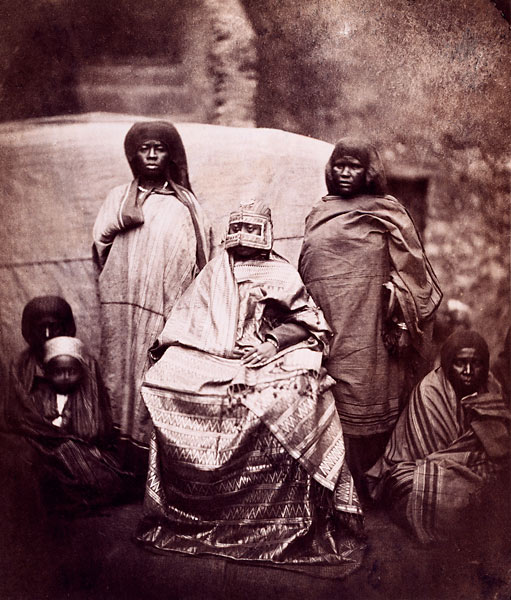
- Queen Jumbe-Souli, queen of the Comorian island of Mohéli, with other Comorian women. The woman at the lower left is holding a child on her lap. Photographed in 1863.

General statistics
- Maternal mortality (per 100,000): 280 (2010)
- Women in parliament: 3.0% (2012)
- Women over 25 with secondary education: NA
- Women in labour force: 35.1% (2010)

Gender Inequality Index
- Value: NR

Global Gender Gap Index
- Value: 0.631 (2022)
- Rank: 134th out of 146

Among men who can afford it, the preferred form of marriage appears to be polygyny with matrilocal residence. Although possible, the first marriage is formally initiated with the grand marriage when possible, subsequent unions involve much simpler ceremonies. The result is that a man will establish two or even more households and will alternate residence between them, a reflection, most likely, of the trading origins of the Shirazi elite who maintained wives at different trading posts. Said Mohamed Djohar, elected president in 1990, had two wives, one in Njazidja and the other in Nzwani, an arrangement said to have broadened his appeal to voters. For men, divorce is easy, although by custom a divorced wife retains the family home.

In the Comoros certain landholdings called magnahouli are controlled by women and inherited through the female line, apparently in observance of a surviving matriarchal African tradition.

Despite their lower economic status, women in the Comoros who are married to farmers or laborers often move about more freely than their counterparts among the social elite, managing market stands or working in the fields. On Mwali, where traditional Islamic values are less dominant, women generally are not as strictly secluded. Women constituted 40.4 percent of the work force in 1990, a figure slightly above average for sub-Saharan Africa.

== Education ==
Girls are somewhat less likely than boys to attend school in the Comoros. The World Bank estimated in 2010 that 70.6 percent of girls were enrolled in primary schools, whereas 80.5 percent of boys were enrolled. In secondary school, 15 percent of eligible Comoran girls were in attendance, in comparison with about 19 percent of eligible boys.

As of 2014, 48.7% of girls and 46.3% of boys completed lower secondary school. The female rate in the Comoros is higher than Sub-Saharan Africa but lower than the lower middle income group. Lower secondary education completion rate measures how many children have completed the last grade of lower secondary education regardless of age completed.

In 2022, the female literacy rate was 56.9% whereas the male literacy rate was 66.6% and the female literacy rate for Sub-Saharan Africa in general stood at 61.4%.

== Political Participation ==
Although the 1992 constitution recognizes their right to suffrage, as did the 1978 constitution, women otherwise play a limited role in politics in the Comoros. By contrast, in Mahoré female merchants sparked the movement for continued association with France, and later, for continued separation from the Republic of the Comoros.

In one of Comoran society's first acknowledgements of women as a discrete interest group, the Abdallah government organized a seminar, "Women, Family, and Development," in 1986. Despite participants' hopes that programs for family planning and female literacy would be announced, conference organizers stressed the role of women in agriculture and family life. Women fared slightly better under the Djohar regime. In February 1990, while still interim president, Djohar created a cabinet-level Ministry of Social and Women's Affairs, and appointed a woman, Ahlonkoba Aithnard, to head it. She lasted until a few weeks after Djohar's election to the presidency in March, when her ministry was reorganized out of existence, along with several others. Another female official, Situ Mohamed, was named to head the second-tier Ministry of Population and Women's Affairs, in August 1991. She lost her position—and the subministry was eliminated—hardly a week later, in one of President Djohar's routine ministerial reshufflings. Djohar made another nod to women in February 1992, when he invited representatives of an interest group, the Women's Federation, to take part in discussions on what would become the constitution of 1992. Women only apparently organized and participated in a large demonstration critical of French support of the Djohar regime in October 1992, following government suppression of a coup attempt.

== Demographics ==
The Comoros accepted international aid for family planning in 1983, but it was considered politically inexpedient to put any plans into effect. According to a 1993 estimate, there were 6.8 births per woman in the Comoros. By contrast, the figure was 6.4 births per woman for the rest of sub-Saharan Africa. In 2023, the birth rate had contracted to 29.884 births per 1000 people, a 1.45% decline from 2022.

The maternal mortality ratio in the Comoros has improved from 456 in 2000 to 217 in 2020. Maternal mortality in the Comoros is lower than its regional average. The maternal mortality ratio is the number of women who die from pregnancy-related causes while pregnant or within 42 days of pregnancy termination per 100,000 live births.

== See also ==
- Women in Africa
