= Women in Seychelles =

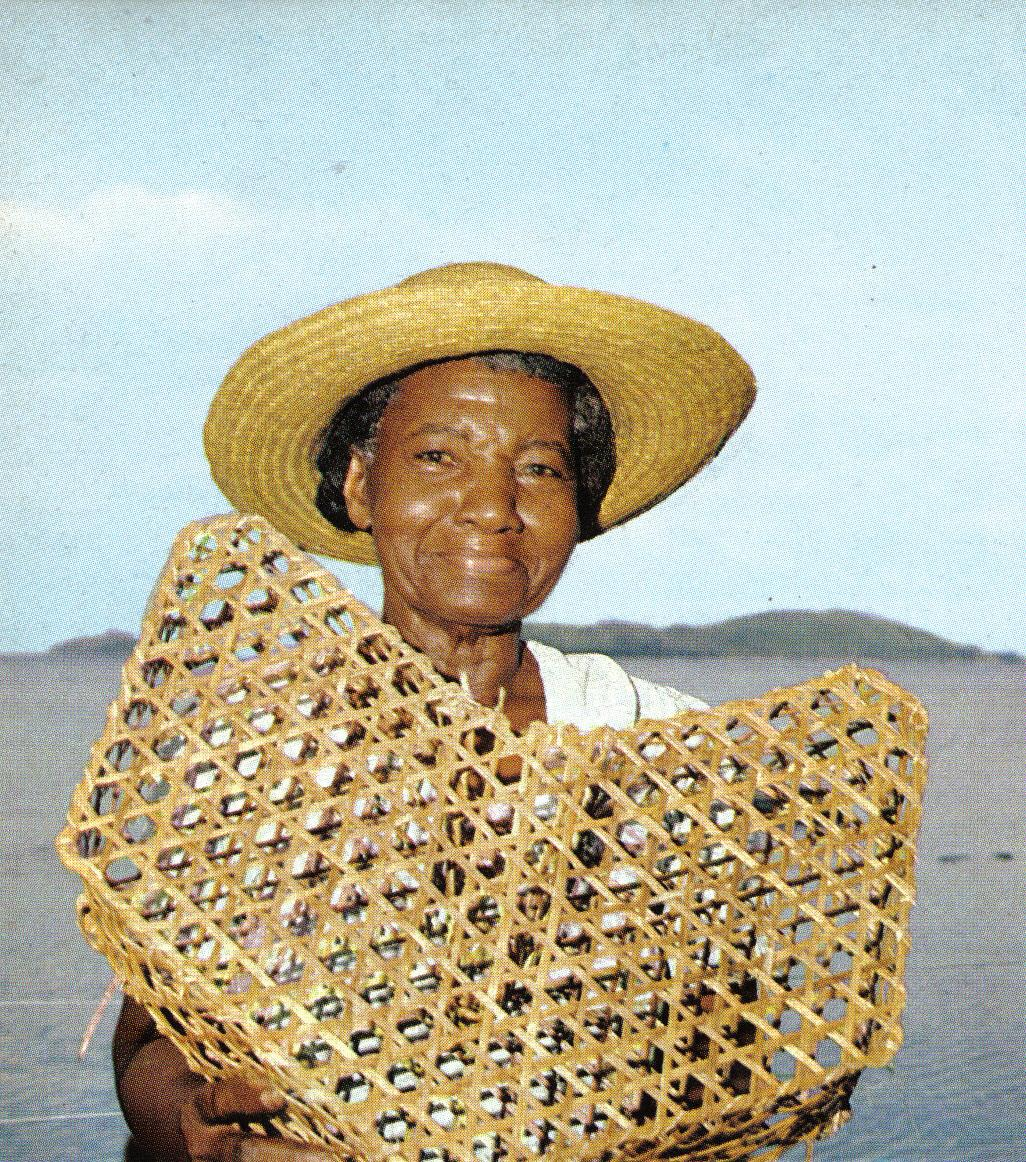
- A woman in the Seychelles and her fishtrap, during the early part of the 1970s.

General statistics
- Women in parliament: 22.86% (2020)
- Women in labour force: 64.29% (2020)

Women in Seychelles hold the same legal, political, economic, and social rights as men.

== Family life ==
Seychellois society is essentially matriarchal, which stems from the 'matrifocal' nature created through slavery. Mothers tend to be dominant in the household, controlling most current expenditures and looking after the interests of the children. Many couples remain unwed because the cultural standards for weddings require luxury and are extremely expensive. There is not much social stigma around remaining unwed, patricularly in low-income communities. Unwed mothers are the societal norm, and the law requires fathers to support their children. Men are important for their earning ability, but their domestic role is relatively peripheral. Women over 50 are considered elderly and are largely excluded from the labour market, leaving them with poor social standings. Elderly women must usually count on financial support from family members living at home or contributions from the earnings of grown children.

=== 'Matrifocality' in Seychelles ===
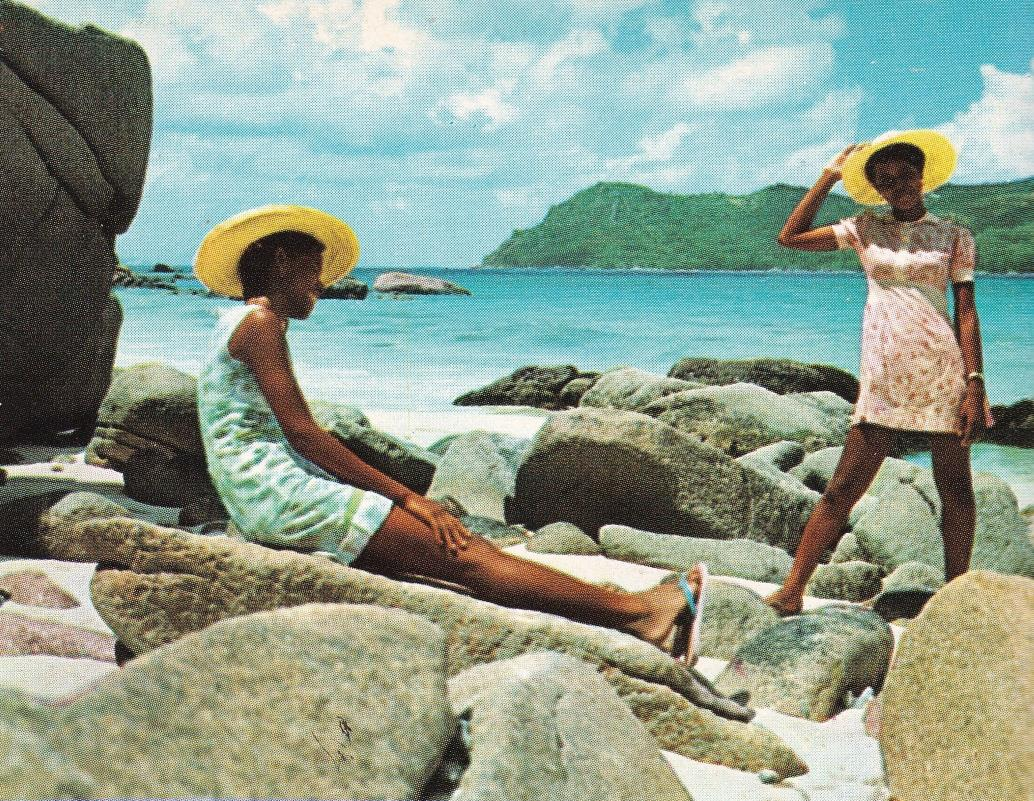
Seychelles Women, 1970

Seychelles is largely considered to be a 'matrifocal' society, meaning that the central kinship lines, source of income, and relational contacts are traced through the mother's ancestry rather than the father's. It does not mirror patriarchal societies social hierarchies as women are not necessarily in better social positions than men. This dynamic is rooted in the socio-historical context of colonialism and slavery in Seychelles, which did not encourage marriage or family life, but required reproduction to sustain itself. Enslaved men were taken by their masters to habituate other colonies, leaving women behind to maintain the family and community. This process is what created the matrifocal social structure that persists in Seychelles today.

=== Violence against women ===
Domestic violence against women was a continuing problem. Police rarely intervened in domestic disputes unless it involved a weapon or major assault. The authorities often dismissed the few cases that reached a prosecutor, or the court gave the perpetrator a light sentence. There was growing societal concern about domestic violence and increased recognition of the need to address it. In 2013 the Minister for Social Affairs, Vincent Meriton, helped develop a plan of action with the United Nations Office on Drugs and Crime (UNODC) to tackle gender-based violence through revised police training, awareness-raising, and a legal focus on prosecuting sex-trafficking and organized crime.

Rape, spousal rape, and domestic abuse are criminal offences punishable by a maximum of 20 years' imprisonment.The law prohibits sexual harassment but is rarely enforced. During 2007, the Family Tribunal registered 74 domestic violence complaints. The police registered 56 rape cases and four cases of attempted sexual assault. The Social Affairs Division of the Ministry of Health and Social Development and Women in Action and Solidarity Organization, a local NGO, provided counseling services to rape victims.

== Wider society ==
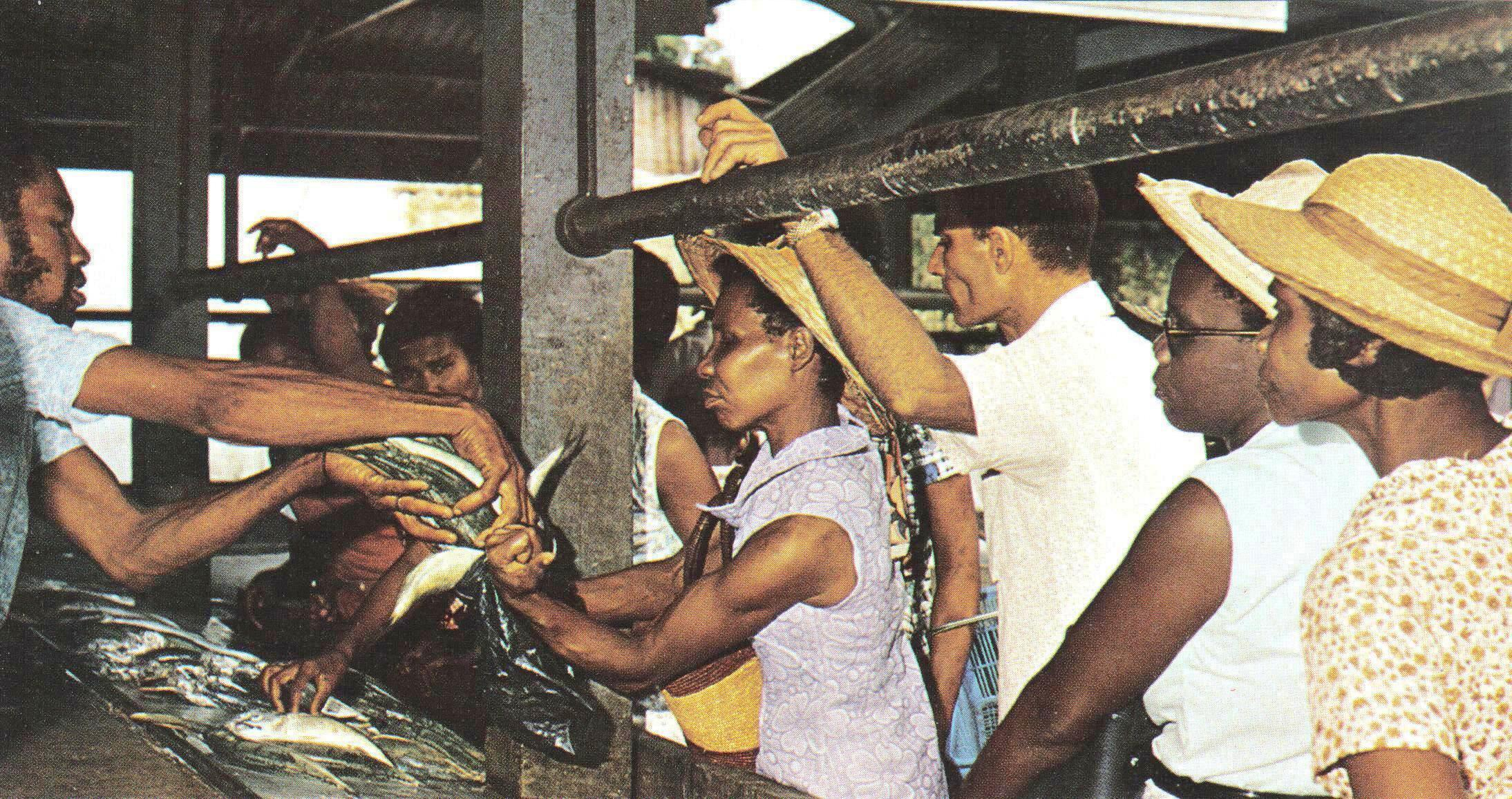
Women at a Fish Market in Seychelles

Seychelles is a very young population, with a relatively low average birth and death rates. Both women and men have significantly higher life expectancies compared to global averages. Inheritance laws do not discriminate against women.

There is no officially sanctioned gender discrimination in employment and women are well represented in business.

Prostitution is illegal but remains prevalent. Police generally do not apprehend prostitutes unless their actions involved other crimes.

=== Women's education in Seychelles ===
Seychelles has equally high literacy rates across gender lines.There is equal access to primary education for boys and girls, and the education standards continually improve.

Seychelles' Ministry of Education launched the #AfricaEducatesHer campaign in October 2024, targeting issues like school dropouts, teenage pregnancies, and mental health. The #AfricaEducatesHer campaign has been similarly launched in 14 African Union member states, with different programs for their nations' needs. Seychelles was recognized for being one of the most successful countries in implementing the campaign.

As of 1994, women formed nearly half of the enrollment at the prestigious Seychelles Polytechnic, the formerly highest level of education on the islands. The University of Seychelles, the country's first university, opened in 2009.

In 2022, women led research on the native seagrass in the coasts of Seychelles to support the government's commitment to make sure all seagrass meadows are protected by 2030. These scientists and students are researching the carbon in seagrass to find nature-based solutions to climate change.

=== Women in sports and recreation ===
Judoka Amandah Payet was recognized as the Seychelles Sportswoman of the year for 2025 by the National Sports Council. Payet is a weightlifter who won a silver medal at the African Senior Judo Championship in Mauritius in 2025, and a gold medal at the TiSey 2025 international judo tournament.

Chris Yip-Au, a woman from Singapore, is working on building a presence for women's football in Seychelles as the new head coach of the women's national team for the Seychelles Football Federation. In 2025, Emy Casaletti-Bwalya organized the FIFA Beach Soccer World Cup in Seychelles, which was the first FIFA tournament to have ever taken place in Africa.

The Seychelles Women's Volleyball Team won gold at the Indian Ocean Island Games for four consecutive years from 2020-2023. Women's volleyball was the only team sport that produced a gold metal for Seychelles at the games.

In 2023, in honor of World Ocean Day (June 8), an all-female crew embarked on an 18-day sail around the Seychelles' islands of Mahe, Praslin, and La Digue in a catamaran under a female captain. These women responded to the fact that there were no female sailing instructors in the islands and wanted to empower women to get involved in sailing leadership. The sail was meant to show the strength and capability of Seychelles' women at sea, while also sparking a dialogue about marine preservation. Most of the women had marine-related profession and used media coverage of the sail to raise awareness of conservation efforts.

== Women in Seychelles governance ==
As of 2007, there were 10 women in the 34-seat National Assembly, seven elected by direct election and three by proportional representation. Following the July 2007 cabinet reshuffle, there were two women in the cabinet.As of 2013, Seychelles held the fifth highest proportion of women in a national parliament in the world, making a substantial jump in equal gender representation in governance. Most of the population supports and advocates for gender equality in government representation, but over 60% of the population believes that women in political office face backlash for becoming public representatives. As of 2023, over half of the population believes that there is still much work to be done on promoting gender equality in the government.

=== Notable women in Seychelles governance ===
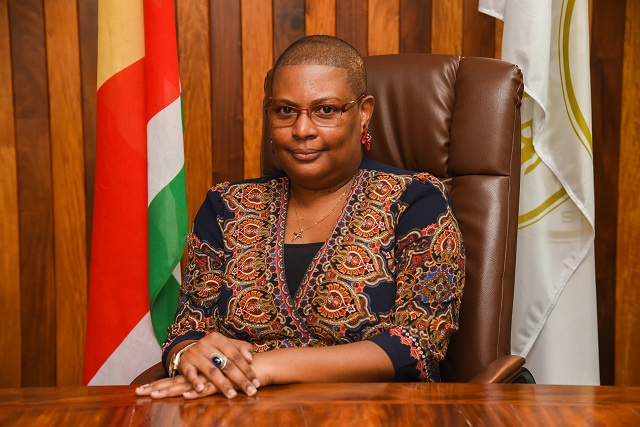
Caroline Abel - first woman to be appointed Governor of the Central Bank in 2012

1. Jutta Alexis - In 2026, Alexis was appointed Deputy Chief Executive Officer of Seychelles Investment Board (SIB). Alexis ran the Ministry of Education from 2021-2024
2. Caroline Abel - In 2012, Abel became the first woman to be appointed Governor of the Central Bank and was awarded Central Bank Governor of the Year Award in 2020. She was also celebrated at the Africa's Woman Leaders Awards in 2020.
3. Angela Servina - After over 11 years in the Town & Country Planning Authority, Servina became the first woman to be appointed chief executive of the Seychelles Town & Country Planning Authority.
4. Astride Tamatave - On March 11, 2024, Tamatave was appointed principal secretary for finance.
5. Varsha Singh - Singh was appointed commissioner general of the Seychelles Revenue Commission (SRC) in 2024.
6. Li Fa Cheung Kai Suet - After 10 years as chief executive of the National Statistics Agency in Mauritius, she was appointed as the Seychelles chief executive of the National Bureau of Statistics.

== See also ==
- Women in Africa
