= Kakenya Ntaiya =

Kenyan feminist, educator, and academic

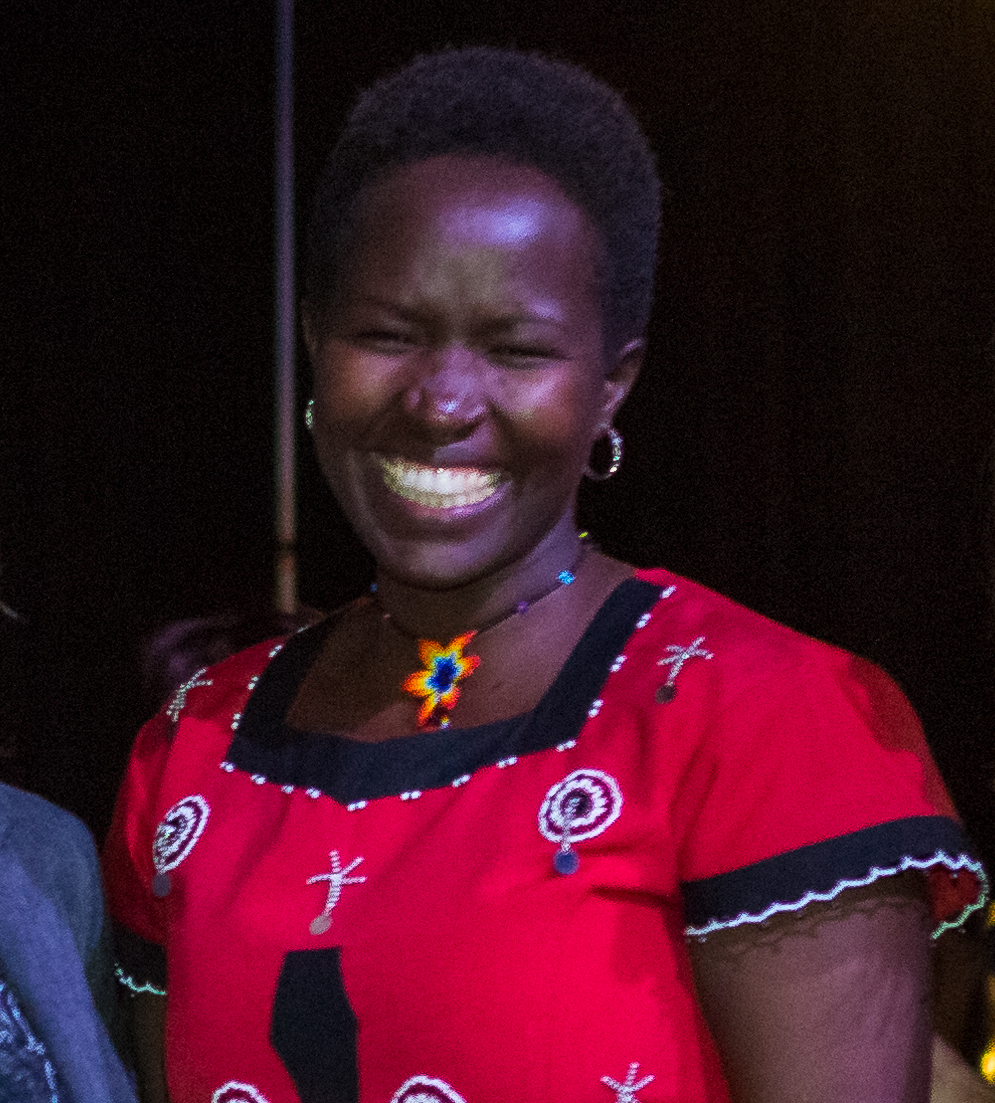
- Ntaiya in 2016
- Born: 1978 (age 47–48); Enoosaen, Kilgoris, Kenya
- Citizenship: Kenyan
- Education: Randolph-Macon Woman's College, University of Pittsburgh
- Occupations: Educator; Feminist; Social activist
- Years active: 2009–present
- Organization: Kakenya Center for Excellence
- Known for: Anti-FGM work
- Title: Founder and President of Kakenya Center for Excellence
- Awards: Vital Voices Global Leadership Award (2011); CNN Top Ten Hero of the Year (2013); Global Women's Rights Award (2013)

Kakenya Ntaiya (born 1978) is a Kenyan educator, feminist and social activist.

She is the founder and president of the Kakenya Center for Excellence, a primary boarding school for girls in the Maasai village of Enoosaen. The first class of 30 students enrolled in May 2009. The center requires that parents agree not to subject their enrolled daughters to female genital mutilation (FGM/C) or forced marriage.

== Early life and education ==
Ntaiya is the eldest of eight children. Maasai tradition and culture dictated that Ntaiya should be engaged around the age of five, undergo female genital mutilation (FGM) as a teenager, and then leave school to marry. Instead, she negotiated with her father that she would undergo FGM if that meant she could continue her education and complete high school.

Ntaiya holds an undergraduate degree from Randolph-Macon Woman's College in Lynchburg, Virginia. While a student there, she was the subject of a four-part series in the Washington Post titled "Kakenya's Promise". Ntaiya went on to earn a Doctorate in Education from the University of Pittsburgh, where she was the recipient of the Sheth International Young Alumni Achievement Award.

== Awards ==
Ntaiya is the recipient of a number of awards that recognize her work to educate girls: Vital Voices Global Leadership Award (2011), CNN Top Ten Hero of the Year (2013), and the Global Women's Rights Award from the Feminist Majority Foundation (2013).
