= Women in the Western Sahara =

Women in the Western Sahara, commonly known as Sahrawi women, play important roles in family life, refugee camp administration, political activism, and social services, both within the territory controlled by Morocco and in the Sahrawi refugee camps in Tindouf, Algeria. Sahrawi women have been prominent within the Polisario Front’s institutions and in managing long-term refugee camps. In contrast, women living in the Moroccan-administered areas face legal and political constraints and documented human-rights concerns. The modern political mobilization of Sahrawi women is closely linked to the Western Sahara conflict between Morocco and the Polisario Front. Since the 1970s, and the establishment of refugee camps near Tindouf, Sahrawi women have taken on public responsibilities, including health, education, and camp administration roles that challenged traditional gender divisions in Sahrawi society and became integral to the national liberation project.

== Culture and family life ==
Sahrawi culture retains important traditional social practices through language, dress, and family networks. However, wartime displacement and political mobilization have influenced family structures and gender roles. Women’s public visibility in camps and political life is often framed in Sahrawi narratives of national resistance. When it comes to political participation and activism, Sahrawi women are active in Polisario front structures and civil society organizations advocating for self-determination, social services, and women’s rights. Women have also participated in protests and public demonstrations related to the occupation and human-rights complaints. Some women activists in Moroccan-administered Western Sahara have faced arrests, harassment, or violence.
