= Women and agriculture in Sub-Saharan Africa =

The agricultural system in Sub-Saharan Africa is a predominantly small-scale farming system with more than 50% of the agricultural activity performed by women, producing about 60-70% of the food in this region. While women provide the majority of the labor in agricultural production, their access and control over productive resources is greatly constrained due to inequalities constructed by patriarchal norms.

== Women’s role in agriculture ==
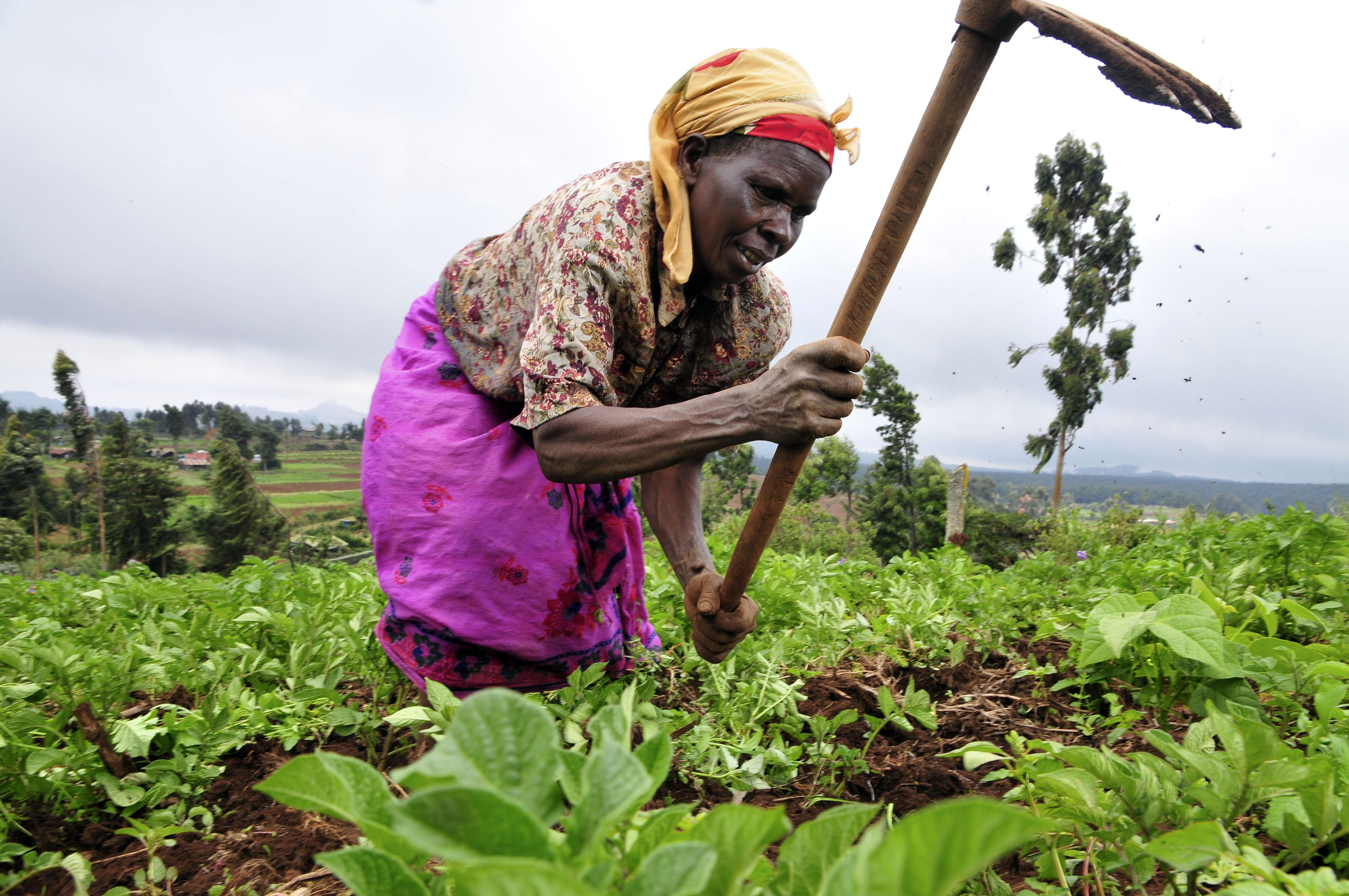
A Kenyan farmer at work in the Mount Kenya region.

Women play a critical role in food security in this region of Africa by fulfilling their role as food providers. They make essential contributions to the agricultural and rural economies in all developing countries. There are 3 basic variants of household food production systems in Sub-Saharan Africa:

1. Women are responsible for the production of all or most food crops. In this variant, food plots are considered women's plots.
2. Men and women jointly cultivate staple food crops in fields controlled by male household heads. In this type, the male household head controls the output.
3. Men produce food, while women transform the agricultural products into food. This variant is mainly encountered where Islamic practices of female seclusion prevent women from engaging in fieldwork.

In many countries in Africa, there is a rigid division of labor by gender in agriculture. This division may be based on types of activities performed on the farm or types of crops grown by men and women. The division of labor is based on patriarchal norms that typically require women to care for the needs of the members of the household and men to bring money. Women are also expected to help their fathers and later on their husbands in the fields, which increases women's workload. Sometimes men help women in clearing their plots to prepare the land.

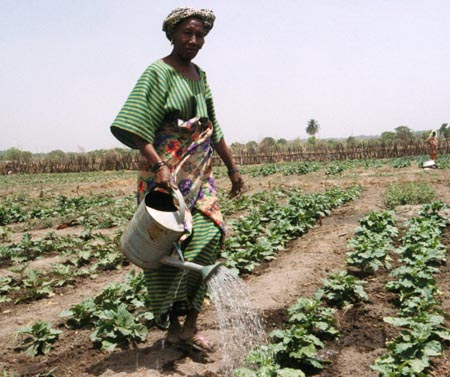
A farmer at the women's agricultural cooperative of Walikaly village in Siguiri Prefecture, Guinea

In regions where women and men work on separate plots growing different crops, women are usually engaged in subsistence farming to provide food to fulfill the needs of the members of the household, while men are engaged in the production of a different subsistence crop and/or cash or export crops. Since the early 21st century, this pattern has been prevalent in several Sub-Saharan African countries like Tanzania, Uganda, Cameroon, Burkina Faso, etc. This distinction can be explained as a result of gender norms that assign women with the responsibility of feeding the family and men with the responsibility of providing cash income.

In Southeast Nigeria, for example, there exist distinctions between traditionally "male" and "female" crops. "Female" crops are normally ephemeral or short-lived household crops, including cassava, beans, maize, plantains, and cocoyams. "Male" crops, meanwhile, include food staples such as yams, which are also considered the "prestige" crop.

Rural women often manage complex households and pursue multiple livelihood strategies, Although women mainly grow food crops for household consumption, if there is any marketable surplus, they sell it in the market. However, women's primary responsibility is to feed the family and only after that they can engage in other income earning activities. The distinction between crops is sometimes not very clear especially in the case of maize which is a staple crop in several Sub-Saharan African countries as well as a cash crop. With the introduction of high yielding varieties of maize, now the distinction is that the high yielding varieties tend to be men's crop, and local varieties are women's crop. This pattern has been observed in Malawi where local varieties of maize are woman's crop while hybrid varieties are cash crops cultivated by men. The logic is the same: high yielding varieties provide large amount of marketable surplus which allows men to provide cash income while women continue with varieties that provide enough for subsistence consumption.

Women's role is not limited to food production; they are also required to process and prepare the food they grow, perform care work in the household and also help men in their cash crop production.

As for division of labor by tasks, traditionally, men cleared the forests, burned the bush, tended and harvested the fruits of tree crops such as the oil palm, fenced fields against wild animals, and in some regions planted crops. Women are responsible for weeding, post-harvest production, and food preparation. Women are also responsible for transporting and marketing the cash crops with male members of the household. In a study for Kenya in the 1980s, it was reported that women were mainly responsible for hand digging, harvesting and transporting the crops while men were responsible for building the granary. However, gradually the distinction between men's and women's tasks is becoming quite blurred. There are very few tasks that are done exclusively by men like clearing of field. Women perform most of the tasks on their plots from sowing, weeding to harvesting, and may get some assistance from men in clearing and preparing the land for cultivation. On a man's plot, women may provide help in weeding, harvesting, etc.

There is also some evidence that the roles of men in subsistence agriculture were traditionally somewhat greater in many regions before the period following the introduction of additional New World crops from the Americas such as plantains, maize, and cassava. In contrast to certain older traditional and indigenous staple food crops like yams or millet which tended to, and continued to be, grown mainly by men or with more male involvement (sometimes grown along with, varying by region, supplementary food crops often grown with more female involvement such as cocoyams or sometimes rice), New World crops were often grown with more female involvement. The introduction of cash crops as well as of wage labor during the colonial period (also incentivized partly by colonial-era taxes in cash), and the formation of a more cash-based economy, also tended to further lessen the participation of men in subsistence farming, as they increasingly participated in those newer more lucrative occupations in order to acquire and provide cash for their families at home. Men's traditional involvement in subsistence farming in pre-colonial times tended to be somewhat greater in West Africa than in Central and much of East Africa.

=== Changing roles ===
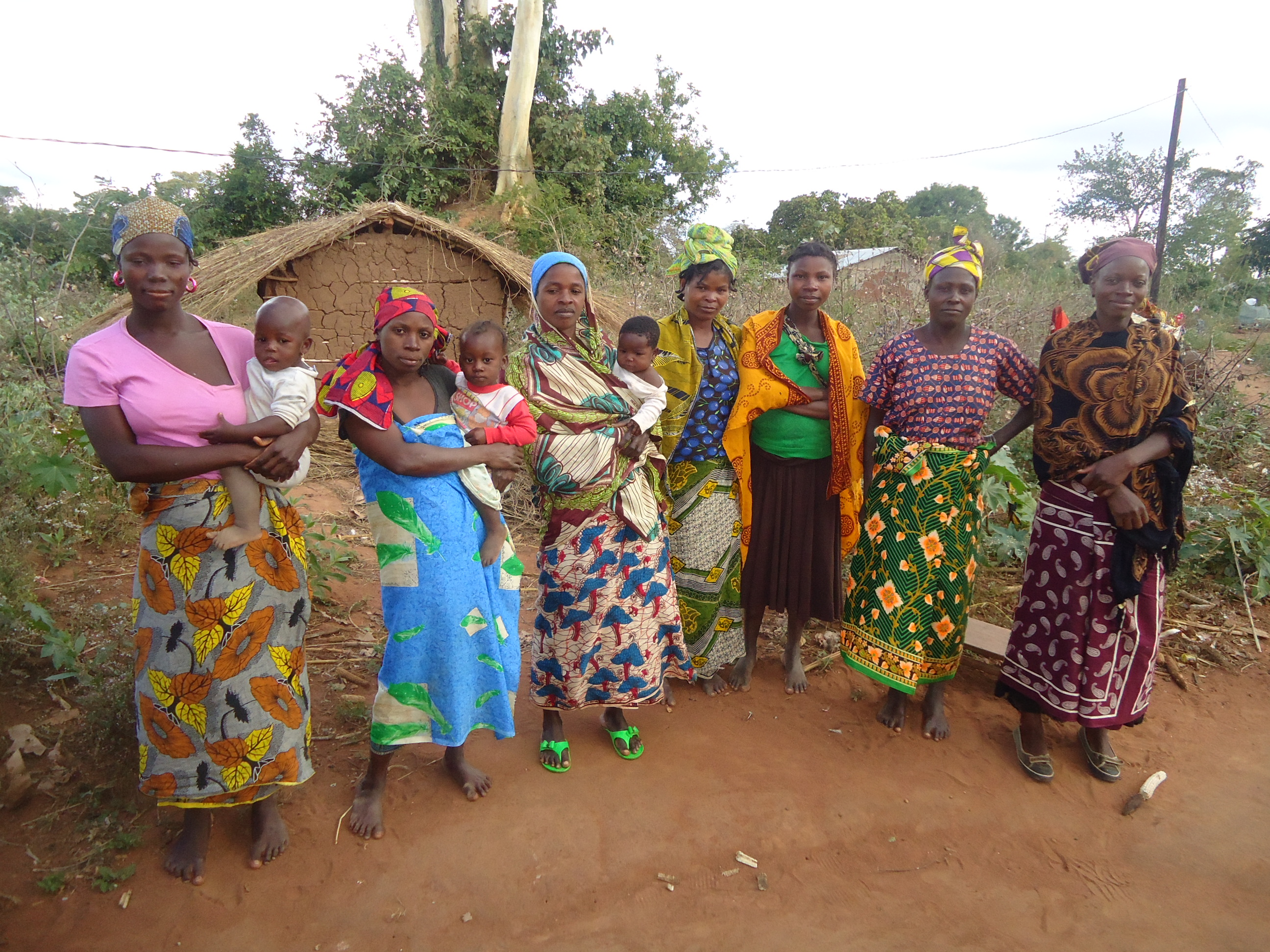
Women farmers near a Cashew farm in Nambiza Village in Nampula province of Mozambique

The gender roles and responsibilities in subsistence economies of Sub-Saharan Africa are dynamic and change with new economic situations. One of the important change noted in the first decade of 21st century is increased participation of women in agriculture as men migrate to work outside of agriculture. For example, in Kenya, Jolou women in the 1980s performed more tasks that were originally considered ‘male’ tasks. Also when men move to non-farm activities, women become more involved in cash cropping. As a result, the gender division of labor by crop and tasks becomes less rigid.

The change in roles is more uni-directional as when economic situation changes it does not appear that men are taking over household activities or production of subsistence crops. Men will increase their participation in women's activities only if some profitable economic opportunity arises. In Burkina Faso, men are becoming involved in picking of Shea nuts which was traditionally women's activity as in the 1980s the sale of these nuts has become highly profitable.

=== Female-headed households ===
The proportion of female-headed households surged significantly since the 1990s. However, the majority of those are de facto headed households and arise because male heads migrate in search of other income-earning opportunities. The proportion of female-headed households varies from 12.9 percent in Niger to 39.3 percent in Namibia between 1998 and 2003. The female-headed households tend to be more heterogeneous. On an average, they tend to be small in size, have lower incomes and be less likely to adopt technology.

Household headship plays an important role in agricultural productivity. To the extent female-headed households are smaller, it may be that they are less productive than male-headed households due to shortage of labor especially in peak seasons. The causality may be reversed as well. If the household is poor and has low incomes, the male head will migrate to find other opportunities. Further, as these households have lower incomes, their ability to adopt technology is also restricted. A study in Zambia finds a negative relationship between female headship and fertilizer adoption.

=== Access to land ===
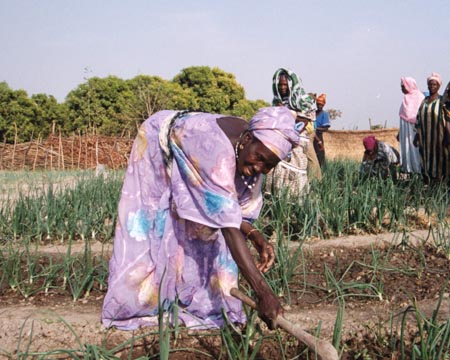
President of an agricultural cooperative in Guinea, working in an onion field

The land tenure systems in Africa vary across the continent. Both women's access to land and security of women's land tenure affects overall productivity. Traditionally, land may be allocated through lineage or village heads which is a model which still persists despite increasing private or state ownership of land. In patrilineal lineages women have access to land through male relatives. For example, in the Beti of Southern Cameroon, women cannot inherit land. They are granted food plots by their husbands but they are not allowed to plant cash crops. When allocations are made by village heads, a lot depends on their perception of different individuals' need for land. To the extent that women are perceived to be less capable of farming their allocations are smaller.

Overall, women's access to land in African societies is quite restricted, even in cases where the law protects women's rights to land, traditional customs inhibit their access and control over land. An example from Mozambique points out that customary law protects single-women and widowed women in access to land. However, there are customs that constrain women's access to land. Single-women can gain access to land through their fathers, brothers or uncles. But, upon marriage in patriarchal communities women's access to land held by these relatives is lost, as they are expected to have access to land through their husbands. Generally, women tend to have smaller land holdings and less fertile plots.

Finally, control over land is an important factor which explains the large differences in investments on land made by men and women. A woman who may have obtained land through her husband may be hesitant to invest in technology if she perceives her marriage to be unstable. In Zambia, if a marriage is dissolved the land reverts to the lineage and woman has only a limited claim on the land. Among the Haya of Tanzania, women farm grassland plots but do not have permanent rights to the land.

=== Technological development ===
According to the agricultural intensification hypothesis, as the population pressure increases and agricultural production moves away from a more traditional practice to a more tool based or mechanized (use of plough) farming, role of women in agriculture declines. However, this decline in women's role is more in relative terms than in absolute terms. With increased capital intensification like increased use of tractors and ox implements, acreage increases and that implies women have to do more weeding and harvesting and increased work of caring for domestic animals, thus, more labor demands from women.

Besides tools, fertilizers and pesticides may be quite useful in increasing productivity. Fertilizer use depends on: availability and farmer's resources to purchase. As women farmers generally have less access to cash and credit, they are less likely to purchase and use fertilizers. Research in Burkina Faso on men and women who grew same crop on individual plots showed that most of the inputs such as hired labor, fertilizers, tools went to man's plot. A study from Cameroon and Malawi shows that the structural adjustment programs that remove fertilizer subsidy affect female farmers more than male farmers as they reduce fertilizer application on maize, which is a female crop. Another study conducted in Malawi show that women are less likely than men to adopt new cultural techniques to avoid erosion and that the difference in productivity is related to structural disadvantages.

=== Agricultural extension ===
Agricultural extension service has a significant impact on productivity and output. However, there is evidence that women farmers are not reached by extension services. A study in Malawi found that women had no contact with extension agents and their participation was very limited. Besides the deficiency of extension program to target women farmers, women's participation is constrained by practices like the expectation that woman needs husband's approval for any legal transaction. Lack of education and higher levels of illiteracy among women is another constraint to women receiving extension services.

An agricultural extension program or input provision policy insensitive to gender roles in agriculture will intensify and increase absolute women's work. For example, in 1987 an agricultural extension program in Malawi started a groundnut seed multiplication project with male heads of the households while women were mainly involved in groundnut production. Another research in Kenya shows that agricultural extension programs always tend to ignore plots which are individually managed by women. They would provide assistance to plots which are managed by men and women or only men.

=== Finance and credit ===
Another factor that reduces a woman's efficiency and productivity on her plot is lack of access to credit. Credit is important for securing fertilizer, improved varieties of seeds and other technology on farms. Most women farmers are not able to obtain credit without a male guarantor or without husband's assistance. The disparity between who farms and who receives inputs, credit etc. is due to institutional barriers and social constraints. The perception that women produce crops for subsistence and not for the market, women's less secure land tenure and provision of credit through organizations geared towards men affect provision of credit to women farmers. A study on Kenya, Zimbabwe, Malawi, Zambia and Sierra Leone found that women received only 10% of the credit for smallholder farmers and 1% of total credit to agriculture. Thus, an agriculture development policy intended to create an all-round development in rural Africa needs to be sensitive to needs of women in these subsistence societies.

=== Output and income control ===
In Sub-Saharan Africa both women and men are responsible for selling the cash crops along with some help from other household members. However, women do not get the control over the income. Evidence from Uganda shows that majority of women are involved in producing cash crops still they do not have control over income. Mainly because the rural households and marketing institutions work within a wider framework of patriarchal systems that were tilted in favor of men's control of major household resources.

=== Policy ===
It is quite clear that women's role in agriculture in Sub-Saharan Africa is critical. However, it is often neglected by the households and society in general. This has serious implications for agricultural and overall development of the region. Galdwin and McMillan (1989) address the question of whether a turnaround is possible in Africa without helping women farmers. They specifically point to women farmers’ access to inputs and women being targeted by policies for agricultural and economic reforms. The lack of visibility of women's contribution and participation in agriculture stems from the patriarchal norms that make women's contribution in the household or in subsistence sector– “non-economic or non-market activity”. Moreover, the decision makers continue to regard women as home producers or assistants in farms and not as farmers and economic agents.

The impediments to women's empowerment encompass their lack of access to decision making processes, their low participation in local governance, as well as their limited access to technology inputs and credit. Land tenure is another stumbling block to women's full access and control of land and the agricultural output. These impediments to women's empowerment are also obstacles to agricultural development and food security in this region.

Table 1: Gender-Based Differences in Agriculture
Land	Land title and tenure tend to be vested in men, either by legal condition or by socio-cultural norms. Land reform and resettlement have tended to reinforce this bias against tenure for women. Land shortage is common among women. Women farm smaller and more dispersed plots than men and are less likely to hold title, secure tenure, or the same rights to use, improve, or dispose of land.
Extension	Women farmers have less contact with extension services than men, especially where male-female contact is culturally restricted. Extension is often provided by men agents to men farmers on the erroneous assumption that the message will trickle “across” to women. In fact, agricultural knowledge is transferred inefficiently or not at all from husband to wife. Also, the message tends to ignore the unique workload, responsibilities, and constraints facing women farmers.
Technology	Women generally use lower levels of technology because of difficulties in access, cultural restrictions on use, or regard for women's crops and livestock as low research priorities.
Finance	Women have less access to formal financial services because of high transaction costs, limited education and mobility, social and cultural barriers, the nature of their businesses, and collateral requirements, such as land title, they cannot meet.
Time	Women face far greater time constraints than men. They may spend less time on farm work but work longer total hours on productive and household work and paid and unpaid work, due to gender-based division of labor in child care and household responsibilities.
Mobility	Women are less mobile than men, both because of their child care and household responsibilities and because of sociocultural norms that limit their mobility.
Education and Training	Women are less educated in parts of Africa, Asia, and the Middle East. Illiteracy hampers their access to and ability to understand technical information. Worldwide, women have less access to education and training in agriculture.

In the early 1990s, there has been a growing recognition of women's role in agriculture and the impediments to their development. Research shows that if women are given similar access to resources and inputs as men, they stand to achieve equal or higher yields as that of men. For example, if women in Kenya were to apply the same volume and quality of inputs as used by men, women's yields could increase by 10.5%. If men's average input levels were transferred to women maize farmers, yields would increase by 9%.

=== Women researchers and leaders ===
Vicki Wilde, founder of African Women in Agricultural Research and Development (AWARD), states that only one in four agricultural researchers are women and only one in seven hold a leadership position in an agricultural institution in Africa. According to Wilde this is partly a reason for Africa not being able to achieve food security. Bringing women on board would ensure better and faster progress and would serve as a means for boosting food production.

Mary Njenga, an AWARD fellow form Kenya, is an environmental scientist and has worked to make clean, simple technologies available to poor rural communities. She says, “I can work with women and come up with good technologies, but if I do not have voice with policy-makers, my technologies will remain in the books".

Elizabeth Nsimadala is the President of the Pan Africa Farmers' Organization (PAFO) and President of Eastern Africa Farmers Federation (EAFF). She has been championing farmer-led agriculture technology and innovation at the EAFF through the E-Granary initiative that virtually aggregates farmers' produce for markets. She has been recognized as a champion for sustainable development by World Farmers' Organization through her leadership in a farmer organization.

== See also ==
- Economy of Africa
- Economic history of Africa
- Feminization of agriculture
