= Ruth Neto =

Angolan independence activist (born 1936)

- Born: Maria Ruth Neto; 22 August 1936 (age 89); Luanda, Portuguese Angola
- Occupations: Political organizer; Independence activist; Women's rights activist
- Years active: 1968–2016
- Relatives: Agostinho Neto (brother); António Alberto Neto (nephew); Deolinda Rodrigues (cousin); Roberto Francisco de Almeida (cousin)

Maria Ruth da Silva Chela Neto (born 1936) is a former Angolan independence activist, political organizer, and women's rights campaigner. Although she studied nursing in Portugal and Germany, in 1968 she joined the Movimento Popular de Libertação de Angola (People's Movement for the Liberation of Angola, MPLA) and focused on securing Angola's independence from Portugal. Fearing retaliation from the Polícia Internacional e de Defesa do Estado (International and State Defense Police, PIDE), she lived abroad in Germany, Tanzania and Zambia until 1975, when independence was achieved. From the early 1970s, she was the leader of the Organização das Mulheres de Angola (Organization of Angolan Women, OMA) and became the organization's first national coordinator in 1976. OMA was an affiliate of the Women's International Democratic Federation (WIDF) and from 1976 she served as a vice president on their executive committee and attended and spoke at many of the organization's conferences and seminars over the next decades. In 1977, she was elected to the Central Committee of the MPLA, and was re-elected in 1985. When the leadership of the OMA was restructured in 1983, she served as its secretary general until 1999. In 1986, she became the secretary general of the Pan-African Women's Organization and held that post until 1997.

Neto has been recognized with numerous honors. She received Cuba's highest recognition of women, the Orden Ana Betancourt (Order of Ana Betancourt), in 1985 and was honored as a grand companion in the Order of the Companions of O. R. Tambo of South Africa in 2014. In 2015, she became the first woman to receive the Son and Daughter of Africa Awards for the Promotion of Peace from the African Union. Her portrait was hung in the headquarters of the African Union in 2017 along with other women considered to be the founding mothers of the Pan-African Women's Organization. That year, the OMA hosted a tribute to honor her twenty-one years of service as the secretary general of the organization, and Rádio e Televisão de Portugal (Portuguese Radio and Television Service) featured her biography in its program Rostos (Faces).

== Early life and education ==
Maria Ruth Neto was born in 1936 in Luanda in Portuguese Angola, as the younger sister of Agostinho Neto, who would become the first president of independent Angola. Their father, Agostinho Pedro Neto, was a Methodist minister, who worked at an American mission in Luanda, and their mother, Maria da Silva, was a school teacher. Neto was first educated at the Mission School in Luanda, along with her cousin, Deolinda Rodrigues, niece of Maria da Silva, who had joined the Neto household in 1954 to further her education. In 1956, Neto received a scholarship to study in Portugal at the Seminário de Carcavelos (Seminary of Carcavelos). Her brother Agostinho had been involved with the anti-colonialist movement since the early 1950s and in 1960 became president of the Movimento Popular de Libertação de Angola (People's Movement for the Liberation of Angola, MPLA). This led to his arrest in Portugal and eventual exile to Cape Verde. In response, large numbers of Angolan students studying in Portugal at Carcavelos and Lumiar gathered in a protest at Lisbon Airport in December 1960, and were assisted in leaving by the World Council of Churches and the Comité inter-mouvements auprès des évacués (Inter-Movement Committee for Evacuees). From 1961, the Angolan War of Independence was fought by opposing factions including Frente Nacional de Libertação de Angola (National Liberation Front of Angola, FNLA) and the MPLA, which were joined in 1966 by the União Nacional para a Independência Total de Angola (National Union for the Total Independence of Angola, UNITA), in the struggle against Portuguese rule.

== Career ==
=== Exile (1960–1975) ===
Neto and her fiancé fled to Lüdenscheid, near Cologne, Germany, and she found work in a factory. In 1961, she received a letter from Maria Helena Trovoada, later to become the first lady of São Tomé and Príncipe, urging her to make use of her time there to research upcoming conferences and networks of international women's organizations in which Angolan women could participate. Fearing persecution from the Polícia Internacional e de Defesa do Estado (International and State Defense Police, PIDE) Neto felt she could not return to Angola and moved to Frankfurt. (Note: Scholar Margarida Paredes noted that between 1961 and 1975, women's names that appeared on PIDE's lists included Maria Mambo Café, Margarida Chipenda, Guida Ferreira, Rodeth Gil, and Neto.) After taking nursing courses she transferred to Freiburg to study clinical analysis. In early 1968, Agostinho met her in Vienna, Austria, and in April Neto moved with his family to Dar es Salaam. In Tanzania, she worked in the office of the MPLA and became involved in the work of the Organização das Mulheres de Angola (Organization of Angolan Women, OMA), which had been created in December 1962 by the MPLA with a view to extending its work in rural areas. As most women lived in the countryside, the organization mobilized village women through seminars focused on building cooperation and practical skills, such as literacy campaigns, political and child care education, and sewing classes. In 1971 in Tanzania, Neto met with members of the Chicago Committee for the Liberation of Angola, Mozambique and Guinea, hoping to strengthen ties between the OMA and international women's groups. From the early 1970s, despite living abroad, Neto headed the OMA. After several years, she transferred to the MPLA office in Zambia in the border region with Angola. The Portuguese coup d'état in April 1974, suspended Portugal's military involvement in Angola, leading to Angolan independence on 11 November 1975. Agostinho was proclaimed president on that day, and Neto returned to Luanda.

=== Angola (1975–2008) ===
Upon her return to Angola, Neto became the national co-ordinator for OMA in 1976, when the first national executive body was established. In June, she was one of the main speakers at the Women's International Democratic Federation (WIDF) Bureau meeting that assembled in Lisbon. The executive committee of the WIDF was called the bureau and included the organization's elected officers. Neto was the vice president on the WIDF Bureau from Angola. That year, she traveled to Sweden to meet with activists of the Svenska Kvinnors Vänsterförbund (Swedish Women's Left-wing Association, SKV). Activists from the SKV provided linen and sewing machines, raised funds for the OMA, and sent care packages which included used clothes, that could be given to those in need or sold. Among the many programs she fostered within the OMA were initiatives to organize laborers and teach them self-help processes to fight for equal pay of black and white workers. They organized village committees to tackle adult illiteracy, distribution problems for food and water, and in rural areas they also held courses on new methods of agriculture and hygiene. During the 1977 Congress of the MPLA, Neto was one of three women, including Maria Mambo Café and Rodeth Gil, elected to serve on the Central Committee. She represented the MPLA, along with her sister-in-law Maria Eugénia Neto, in a visit to the Soviet Union the following year.

Neto attended the WIDF's Leadership Training for rural women in Manila in 1979. That year, the OMA established the Nadejda Krupskaya Creche in Luanda to provide child care for children and war orphans and devoted special attention to the well-being of children. They also urged the ministry of health to expand its training for midwives and develop centers in rural areas to address high infant-mortality rates. Neto expressed concerns that insufficient sex and family planning education and punishments for abortion led to the deaths of women and children, and that health institutions should make such programs a priority. OMA favored the elimination of polygamy and the dowry system, and pushed for amendments to the Family Code to equalize rights of men and women within families and other legislation to eliminate inequalities for women's rights in both the workplace and society in general. Neto urged institutions to make more efforts to protect women's rights. In March 1981, she met in Algiers with Fatma-Zohra Djeghroud, the head of the National Union of Algerian Women, to co-ordinate their recommendations on nationalist and women's struggles to be presented at the 1981 Congress of the WIDF to be held in Prague, Czechoslovakia. In June, she traveled to Bulgaria to attend a conference on early childhood development. She led the OMA delegation, which included Luisa Chongololo and Luzia Paim and other officers of the organization, at the October Congress.

At the First Congress of the OMA, held between 2 and 8 March 1983, the organization was restructured and Neto was elected as the secretary general. She led the Angolan delegation which attended the Tenth Congress of the Portuguese Communist Party in December 1983. Speaking at the congress, she stressed the need for Angola to develop as a socialist nation. She protested the involvement of South African troops in the Angolan Civil War and reiterated that Cuban troops would not withdraw until South African aggression ended. She traveled to London in 1984, to attend a protest rally denouncing South African intervention and US support for their actions. She called for peace across the continent of Africa. Neto, Café, and Neto's sister Irene, were elected to the MPLA Central Committee in 1985. That year, Neto, WIDF president Freda Brown, and women representatives for Nicaragua and the Soviet Union were awarded by Fidel Castro the Orden Ana Betancourt (Order of Ana Betancourt), Cuba's highest distinction for women. Neto was elected to succeed Fathia Bettahar of Algeria as the secretary general of the Pan-African Women's Organization (PAWO) in 1986. (Note: Although Angola had not achieved independence, the MPLA sent Maria dos Anjos Nelumba and Maria Judith Santos as delegates to the founding congress of the PAWO held in July 1962, in Dar es Salaam, Tanganyika.) PAWO is an umbrella organization, which was designed to create a platform for women to become political activists in the African nationalist movements, through opposition to colonialism and racist policies and in favor of equality. When African countries gained their independence and the Cold War and Apartheid ended, the focus of PAWO shifted toward peace activism and the human rights of women and girls.

At the June 1987 WIDF Moscow congress, Neto was one of the featured speakers and gave a presentation on the organization and committees that participated in planning the event. In December, she traveled with other representatives of the People's Assembly to West Germany, visiting Bonn, Düsseldorf, and West Berlin, to meet with various groups to discuss developing projects for economic cooperation and fostering commerce. At the 2nd Congress of the OMA, held in March 1988, she was re-elected as secretary general. During the 1990 Congress of the MLPA, Neto chastised President José Eduardo dos Santos, who had succeeded her brother upon his death in 1979, for the lack of women in his administration. She noted that only 59 of the 700 congressional delegates were women, only one woman served in the Political Bureau, and the Central Committee had only six women members. Her comments were met by a "storm of applause" from the participants and a statement by Santos to encourage delegates to elect more women. Neto stepped down as PAWO secretary general in 1997 and was succeeded by Assetou Koité of Senegal. She was succeeded by Luzia Inglês Van-Dúnem as secretary general of OMA in 1999, and until 2008, she served as the OMA's secretary of foreign relations.

== Legacy ==
In 2014, Neto was honored as a Grand Companion in the Order of the Companions of O. R. Tambo of South Africa for her contributions leading to the independence of Angola. Along with the first Namibian president, Sam Nujoma, Neto received the Son and Daughter of Africa Awards for the Promotion of Peace and Security in Africa in 2015 from the African Union. They were the second recipients of the distinction, which was first presented in 2014 to Tanzanian diplomats Hashim Mbita and Salim Ahmed Salim. Neto is recognized one of the founding mothers of the Pan-African Women's Organization. Along with other past presidents Jeanne Martin Cissé, Bettahar, and the then current president Assetou Koité and other founding members, she appeared on a composite portrait that was unveiled in 2017 and is displayed alongside portraits of the heads of state of African nations at the headquarters of the African Union in Addis Ababa, Ethiopia. In 2017, the Rádio e Televisão de Portugal (Portuguese Radio and Television Service)'s program Rostos (Faces) aired a 30-minute episode titled "Ruth Neto", presenting her biography. She was also honored that year in a tribute sponsored the OMA, marking her twenty-one years' service as secretary general of the organization.
