= Senufo =

Senufo may refer to:

- Senufo people
- the Senufo family of languages
- Ceremonial Drum of the Senufo People

== See also ==
- Senufo Bird, a type of hat
