= Fathia Bettahar =

Algerian teacher, policy advisor and women's rights activist

- Bettahar in 1974
- Born: Fathia Saïdi; 27 August 1936; Aleppo, French Mandate of Syria
- Died: 4 August 2021 (aged 84); Algiers, Algeria
- Other names: Fatha Bettahar, Fatiha Bettahar, Fethia Bettahar
- Occupations: Teacher, policy advisor, and activist

Fathia Bettahar (27 August 1936 – 4 August 2021) was an Algerian teacher, policy advisor, and women's rights activist. After completing her schooling at the normal school in Oran in 1955, she taught from 1956 to 1964 before moving into school administration until 1974. During this time, she became involved in women's rights issues and joined the Union nationale des femmes algériennes (National Union of Algerian Women). She was particularly interested in initiatives to help women and girls gain an education. In 1974, she was elected as secretary general of the National Union of Algerian Women, and simultaneously served as the secretary general of the Pan-African Women's Organization (PAWO). She attended numerous women's conferences including the 1975 World Conference on Women hosted in Mexico City, the 1975 Women's International Democratic Federation Congress of Berlin, East Germany, and the 1985 World Conference on Women held in Nairobi, Kenya. She was a vice president of the WIDF from 1975 to 1981, while continuing as the PAWO leader until 1986.

Between 2001 and 2021, Bettahar served on the Commission nationale consultative de protection et de promotion des droits de l'homme (National Advisory Commission for the Protection and Promotion of Human Rights, CNCPPDH). This independent Algerian body monitored human rights legislation and conditions in the country. Throughout her life, she received numerous honors, including Cuba's Order of Ana Betancourt, the Guinean National Order of Merit, and the National Order of Mali. Along with the founding mothers of PAWO, her portrait is displayed at the headquarters of the African Union in Addis Ababa, Ethiopia.

== Early life and education ==
Fathia Saïdi was born on 27 August 1936 in the French Mandate of Syria. (Note: Modern Syria was part of the Ottoman Empire until its collapse at the end of World War I. France was assigned administration of the territory under the League of Nations mandate system in 1920. Although France recognized the need to grant self-rule in Syria in 1936, the country was not granted independence until 1945.) Her mother was Syrian and her father was Algerian. She attended the École Normale d'Instituteurs d'Oran (Normal School for Teachers of Oran) in the northwestern part of French Algeria, where she studied Arabic, French, and English. Earning her Baccalauréat with honors in 1955, Saïdi continued her studies and completed a specialization in applied teaching the following year.

== Career ==
Having completed her studies, in 1956, Saïdi began teaching in Oran. At the end of the year, she married El Habib Bettahar, with whom she would have five children: Rachid, Amira, Amir, Redouane and Ramzi. She was involved in the Oran teachers union and served on its peace committee. During the Algerian War of Independence, women's organizations were banned, but in 1963, the Union nationale des femmes algériennes (National Union of Algerian Women) reorganized. Bettahar joined the organization and quickly became involved in initiatives to help women gain training and schooling. At the time, few Algerian women were educated and the organization recognized the importance of giving women the knowledge to improve their socio-economic situations. She worked on programs that taught women sewing and tapestry skills which they could do from home. In 1964, Bettahar moved from teaching into administration and became a school director for the next decade. When the National Union of Algerian Women launched a women's health initiative in 1967, she worked to help establish family planning and birthing centers in Algiers, Constantine, and Oran. She was a member of the Afro-Asian People's Solidarity Organisation and attended the women's symposium held in 1967 in Moscow and in 1968 in Albania. She studied law at the University of Oran in 1970 and 1971, but did not complete her studies because she wanted to focus on helping other women.

After leaving education in 1974, Bettahar became more involved in women's rights organizations. She contributed articles to feminist publications, such as Tricontinental, discussing both needs and progress women were making in striving for political and educational rights in their struggle for national independence across the Global South. She attended the 3rd Congress of the National Union of Algerian Women, held the first week of April 1974 in Algiers. At the Congress, the organization stressed the need to continue educational and health initiatives to improve opportunities for women. Bettahar was elected as the secretary general, leading the executive board made up of Lauiza Ben Amor, Saliha Boumerteg, Doria Cherifati, Ain Tair Gundez, Fouzia Hadj-Aissa, Louisa Handan, Sassia Mohammedi, and Leila Saoudi. In July, Bettahar attended the Pan-African Women's Organization Congress in Dakar, and was elected to succeed Jeanne Martin Cissé as PAWO's secretary general. As the Pan-African Women's Organization held observer status since the creation of the Organization of African Unity (OAU), the precursor organization to the African Union, in 1963, Bettahar was able to attend all of the meetings of the OAU and influence the policies about women which the organization considered. The goals of PAWO announced in the conference by Bettahar were not just to improve the condition of women in their countries, but to integrate them equally into all sectors of society. In November, along with numerous other prominent women such as Angela Davis, and Valentina Tereshkova, Bettahar was an invited guest at the II Congreso de la Federación de Mujeres Cubanas (2nd Congress of the Federation of Cuban Women), and was awarded by Fidel Castro the Orden Ana Betancourt (Order of Ana Betancourt), inaugurated that year by the Federation of Cuban Women as Cuba's highest distinction for women.

Bettahar gave the opening address at the conference "African Women's Equality: Roles in National Liberation, Development, and Peace" held in Mogadishu, Somalia, in March 1975, as part of the celebrations of the United Nations' declaration of the year as International Women's Year. Her speech highlighted the importance of women working together to fight imperialism and promote peace to create an environment that would allow development for improving the socio-economic status of women in the region. Three months later, Bettahar, Boumerteg, and Mohammedi were the representatives of the National Union of Algerian Women who attended the World Conference on Women held from 19 June to 2 July in Mexico City, as part of the Algerian delegation. This conference was pivotal in changing the global perspective of governments towards women's rights. Prior to that time, governments had viewed women's roles within the confines of traditional and religious norms and public policies had not typically addressed disparities in rights and equal opportunities. Bettahar was one of the speakers at the followup to the conference held on 3 and 4 July to discuss how the conference had been portrayed by the media. Other speakers at the event were American Jane Fonda, Jamaican Beverley Manley, and Panamanian Berta Quesada de Moscote. Leaving Mexico, Bettahar attended the Congress of the Women's International Democratic Federation held in Berlin, East Germany in October and was one of the dignitaries seated on the dais. She was elected as one of the vice presidents of WIDF at the congress.

Bettahar was succeeded by Fatima-Zohra Djeghrour at the 4th Congress of the National Union of Algerian Women held in 1978. At this conference, the participants resolved to continue their initiatives to improve women's education and health, but added the need to push for agrarian reforms and rural outreach. Bettahar was elected to a second term as the secretary general of the Pan-African Women's Organization in 1980. Over the next several years, she traveled to numerous African countries to observe and assist in organizing women's events in Algeria, Burundi, Cameroon, the Congo, Gambia, Libya, Madagascar, Mali, Senegal, and Tanzania. Bettahar attended the 8th WIDF Congress held in Prague and made a report for the commission on creating support between NGOs and the United Nations. She urged continued cooperation with women's organizations and various UN bodies to address women's and children's issues, promote peace, and advance human rights. In 1983, she was invited to Zimbabwe by the Ministry of Community Development and Women's Affairs and gave a radio address during her four-day trip, encouraging African nations to continue to press for gaining their independence and to fight against racism and Apartheid. She was honored as a commander of the Guinean National Order of Merit at the end of 1983. Bettahar attended the first congress of National Union of Sahrawi Women held in the Liberated Territories of the Sahrawi Arab Democratic Republic in March 1985. Four months later, she attended the 1985 World Conference on Women in Nairobi, Kenya, which ended the United Nations Decade for Women. She continued as PAWO president until 1986, when she was succeeded by Ruth Neto of Angola. Bettahar began serving as a school inspector in 1988.

At the 8th Congress of the Pan-African Women's Organization held in Harare, Zimbabwe, in 1999, Bettahar was named as honorary life-time president of the organization. That year she was also honored with the National Order of Mali. Between 2001 and 2016, she served on the Commission nationale consultative de protection et de promotion des droits de l'homme (National Advisory Commission for the Protection and Promotion of Human Rights, CNCPPDH). She chaired the mediation committee of the CNCPPDH. Established in 2001, this independent body monitored and oversaw the compliance of Algeria with international and regional treaty obligations for the protection of human rights. During Bettahar's tenure, the CNCPPDH recommendations led to changes in the laws concerning women's ability to participate in political processes and hold office, to election reform, to protections for religious freedom, to revision of the judicial and penal codes, to protections for expansion of the free expression of the media, to reforms in equal access to education, and to revision of the family and nationality codes, which included measures to protect the rights of women, children, the elderly, and the disabled. For the 50th anniversary of the creation of PAWO in 2012, UNESCO sponsored an event to recognize its founding members. The following year, the African Union decided at its 50th anniversary meeting to hang the portraits of the founding mothers of PAWO alongside the heads of state portraits at their headquarters in Addis Ababa, Ethiopia. The group portrait composition was unveiled in 2017, featuring the likenesses of past presidents Cissé, Bettahar, and Neto, alongside the current president Assetou Koité across the top. Other founding members were also pictured, along with a plaque naming them as a visible reminder of women's contributions to the development of Africa.

== Death and legacy ==
Bettahar died on 4 August 2021 and was buried at the Cimetière Djenane Sfari (Djenane Sfari Cemetery) in Algiers. Alberto García Molinero and Teresa María Ortega López called Bettahar one of the "most notably prestigious intellectual authors who published in the feminist magazine Tricontinental".
