= Adja =

Adja may refer to:

- Adja Rose Basse (1920–2005), Senegalese trade unionist
- Adja Kane (born 2005), French basketball player
- The Aja language, mainly spoken in Benin
- Aja people of west Africa, mainly residents of Benin
- Abbreviation of Adjassou-Linguetor, a loa in the religion of West African Vodun
