= Edwige-Renée Dro =

Writer, translator and literary activist from Ivory Coast

- Born: 1980s Côte d'Ivoire
- Occupations: Writer, translator and literary activist
- Known for: Co-founder of Abidjan Lit
- Awards: Morland Writing Scholarship

Edwige-Renée Dro (born 1980s) is a writer, translator and literary activist from Côte d'Ivoire. She is co-founder of the literature collective Abidjan Lit.

== Career ==
In 2014, Edwige-Renée Dro was named as one of those chosen for the Africa39 project intended to showcase 39 promising young African writers under the age of 40, and was included in the anthology Africa39: New Writing from Africa South of the Sahara (edited by Ellah Allfrey, 2014).

She was a PEN International New Voices award judge, and was also on the judging panel of the Etisalat Prize for Literature in 2016.

About the literature collective that she co-founded in Abidjan, Côte d'Ivoire, she has said: "Whatever Abidjan Lit is, it wants to put books at the centre of lives and at the heart of cities, cities in Côte d’Ivoire but also cities throughout the black world." Other literary ventures with which she has been involved include Jalada and Writivism.

She was awarded a Morland Writing Scholarship in 2018.

In March 2020, she opened a public library with a focus on women's writing from Africa and black diaspora, located in Yopougon, Abidjan, and called "1949" to commemorate the Ivorian women who in 1949 marched against colonial power.

She is a contributor to the 2019 anthology New Daughters of Africa, edited by Margaret Busby.
