= Pan-African Women's Organization =

African women's activist organization

Pan-African Women's Organization Organisation Panafricaine des Femmes
- Abbreviation: PAWO
- Predecessor: African Women's Union
- Successor: 31 July 1974; 52 years ago
- Formation: 31 July 1962; 64 years ago
- Founded at: Dar es Salaam, Tanganyika
- Type: NGO
- Headquarters: Addis Ababa, Ethiopia
- Official language: Arabic, English, French, Portuguese
- Secretary General: Grace Kabayo (Uganda)
- President: Eunice Lipinge (Namibia)
- Publication: African Woman
- Website: www.opfpawo.com
- Formerly called: African Women's Organization, All-Africa Women's Conference, Conference of African Women

The Pan-African Women's Organization (PAWO, Organisation Panafricaine des Femmes, (OPF)) was founded as the African Women's Union in 1962. In 1974, the organization changed its name to the Pan-African Women's Organization. It was originally formed as an organization to fight against colonialism and racial discrimination and allow women across Africa to unite in their efforts for gaining socio-economic equality. Independence and an end to Apartheid, shifted the organizational goals toward human rights and peace activism. It is currently headquartered in Addis Ababa, Ethiopia.

== History ==
Aoua Kéita, a French Sudanese midwife and trade unionist, and Jeanne Martin Cissé, a Guinean teacher, led a series of meetings to generate discussion on Pan-Africanism throughout Africa in 1961. A conference was held in Guinea in July for women's associations to discuss organizing together in their struggles for national liberation. Women from Dahomey (now Benin) Egypt, Liberia, Morocco, Niger, Sierra Leone, Senegal, Togo, and Tunisia, met to plan an organizational conference to be held in Dar es Salaam, Tanganyika( now Tanzania) on the last day of July. The planning committee sent invitations to all known women's groups across the continent. Delegates attended from, Algeria, Angola, Cape Verde, Ethiopia, Gabon, Ghana, Guinea, Guinea-Bissau, Ivory Coast, Uganda, Kenya, Liberia, Mali, Mozambique, Namibia, Niger, Northern Rhodesia, Republic of Congo, Senegal, South Africa, Southern Rhodesia (Zimbabwe), Tanganyika, Togo, Tunisia, and Zanzibar, who formed the African Women's Union, sometimes referred to as the All-Africa Women's Conference, or Conference of African Women.

The organization names its founders as Putuse Appolus (1930–1986, Namibia), Phoebe Asiyo (1932, Kenya), Nima Ba (1927–2021, Guinea), Fatoumata Agnès Diaroumeye Bembelo (Niger), Fathia Bettahar (1936–2021, Algeria), Angie Brooks (1928–2007, Liberia), Jeanne Martin Cissé (1926–2017, Guinea), Fatou Toure Conde (1929, Guinea), Jeanne Gervais (1922–2012, Ivory Coast), Radhia Haddad (1922–2003, Tunisia), Jeannette Haïdara (1924–2008), Yodit (Judith) Imru (1931–2007, Ethiopia), Betty Kaunda (1928–2012, Zambia), Aoua Keita (1912–1980, Mali), Margaret Wambui Kenyatta (1928–2017, Kenya), Pumla Ellen Ngozwana Kisosonkole (1911–1997, South Africa/Uganda), Muthoni Likimani (born 1925, Kenya), Bibi Titi Mohammed (1926–2000, Tanzania), Joyce Mpanga (1934–2023, Uganda), Rebecca Mulira (1920–2002, Uganda), Ruth Neto (Angola), Fathia Nkrumah (1932–2007, Egypt/Ghana), Maria Nyerere (1930, Tanzania), Aïssata Sow-Coulibaly (1920–1971, Mali), Adelaide Tambo (1929–2007, South Africa), Jacqueline Tapsoba (Burkina Faso), Aïssata Berthe Traore (1927–2005, Mali), and Marguerite Adjoavi Thompson Trénou (1921–2008, Togo).

== Organizational structure and goals ==
The initial goals of the organization were to create a platform where women could become politically active in the African nationalist movements and oppose colonialism and racist policies in their fight for equality, in the socio-economic and cultural development of their nations. The women's fight to improving their living conditions in the independence movements focused on both violence against women and the dual constraints placed upon women by colonial and traditional cultural power hierarchies. The first secretary general of the organization was Jeanne Cissé, and it was headquartered in Bamako, Mali until the 1968 coup d'état, when the headquarters relocated to Guinea. In honor of the founding congress, 31 July became recognized in 1970, as Pan-African Women's Day. At the July 1974 Congress, the name of the organization was changed to the Pan-African Women's Organization (PAWO) / Organisation Panafricaine des Femmes (OPF), the headquarters moved to Algiers and Fathia Bettahar was elected to succeed Cissé as secretary general. At the 6th Congress of PAWO, held in March 1986, Bettahar stepped down when Ruth Neto was elected as general secretary and the organizational headquarters moved to Luanda, Angola. Neto was succeeded by Assetou Koité of Senegal as secretary general in 1997. Besides its headquarters, the organization has regional division offices in Equatorial Guinea, Niger, Tanzania and Tunisia, which work in conjunction with national organizations. All national women's organizations of the members of the Organisation of African Unity, until its demise in 2002, were members of the Pan-African Women's Organization. The Organisation of African Unity was founded in 1963 and from that date PAWO had observer status with the organization.

The executive council of the organization meets biennially and congresses were initially held every four years for delegates of all member organizations. The umbrella organization unites women from 54 countries and territories, and publishes African Woman quarterly in Arabic, English, French, and Portuguese. Congresses have been held in 1962 in Dar es Salaam, Tanganyika; in 1964 in Monrovia, Liberia; in 1968 in Algiers, Algeria; in 1974 in Dakar, Senegal; in 1980 in Tripoli, Libya; in 1986 in Angola; in 1992 in Ouagadougou, Burkina Faso; in 1997 in Harare, Zimbabwe; in 1999 in Windhoek, Namibia; in 2002 in Luanda, Angola; in 2003 and 2008 in Pretoria, South Africa; and in 2020 in Windhoek, Namibia.

With the independence of countries in the continent and the end of the Cold War and Apartheid, the focus of PAWO shifted toward peace activism and the human rights of women and girls. Top priorities include cultural development and ending gender disparities, particularly in the areas of education, eradicating poverty, and improving opportunities. Health and well-being programs, as well as political representation are also among the focuses of the organization. It also provides a networking platform for the women of Africa to interact and coordinate activities with other international feminist organizations. The headquarters moved from Angola to Pretoria, South Africa, in 2008 when Koité was elected as PAWO president, and later relocated to Addis Ababa, Ethiopia. Eunice Lipinge of Namibia was elected to succeed Koité as president in 2020, and Grace Kabayo (Uganda) succeeded Yatima Nahara (South Africa), and Pinky Kekana (South Africa) as secretary general. PAWO has consultative status with the International Labour Organization, the United Nations Educational, Scientific and Cultural Organization and the United Nations Economic and Social Council. Since 2017, the organization has been an official specialized agency of the African Union.
