= Hortense Aka-Anghui =

Ivorian politician (1933 – 2017)

Mayor of Port-Bouët
- In office 1980–2017

Minister for Women's Affairs
- In office 1986–1990

President of the Association des Femmes Ivoiriennes
- In office 1984–1991

Personal details
- Born: Hortense Dadié; December 18, 1933 Agboville, Ivory Coast
- Died: September 30, 2017 (aged 83)
- Party: Democratic Party of Côte d'Ivoire – African Democratic Rally
- Relatives: Bernard Dadié (brother)
- Education: University of Paris

Hortense Aka-Anghui (December 18, 1933 – September 30, 2017) was an Ivorian politician.

Born Hortense Dadié in Agboville, Aka-Anghui was the sister of Bernard Dadié.

She was elected to the National Assembly as a member of the Democratic Party of Côte d'Ivoire – African Democratic Rally in 1965, later serving as vice-president of the Assembly and remaining a member until 1990. With Gladys Anoma and Jeanne Gervais, she was one of the first women elected to that body.

From 1980 to 2017, she served as mayor of Port-Bouët. She also served as the Minister for Women's Affairs from 1986 to 1990, and from 1984 until 1991 as president of the Association des Femmes Ivoiriennes. She also served as a member of the Central Committee and the Political Bureau of her political party.

Aka-Anghui trained, as a pharmacist, earning a doctorate from the University of Paris in 1961, and operated a pharmacy and medical laboratory in Treichville, in which town she had been raised, prior to entering politics.

== See also ==
- Agboville
- Bernard Dadié
- National Assembly
- Port-Bouët
