= Abassia =

Abassia is an old spelling of several places:

- Abassia Fodil (1918–1962), Algerian trade unionist
- Abbassia, a town in Egypt
- The Ethiopian Empire, also called Abyssinia
- The Kingdom of Abkhazia, also called Abasgia
