= Rodeth Gil =

Angolan soldier, nurse and politician (born 1948)

- Born: Rodeth Teresa Makina dos Santos; 26 October 1948 (age 77); Cuíto, Portuguese Angola
- Citizenship: Angola
- Education: London Metropolitan University
- Occupations: Soldier; Nurse; Politician
- Years active: 1965–2014
- Political party: MPLA
- Spouse: Henriques Leonel Gama Gil (?–1967; his death)
- Children: 4

Rodeth Teresa Makina dos Santos Gil (born 26 October 1948) is an Angolan nurse, army general, and politician. Orphaned at a young age, she joined the People's Movement for the Liberation of Angola while still a teenager, ultimately serving as both a soldier and a nurse during the Angolan War of Independence. Following Angolan independence in 1975, Gil initially continued her career as a nurse before being appointed as Secretary of Social Affairs for the Angolan government for much of the 1980s. She later returned to politics as a member of parliament in 2008, where she helped write the new Angolan constitution, before retiring in 2014. An early influential female member of the MPLA, in 2021 she was appointed to the organisation's honorary council.

== Early life ==
Gil was born on 26 October 1948 in the Cantinflas neighbourhood of Cuíto. She spent her first years living in Lunda Norte Province, where her father, Cassanje Makina, worked as a shepherd; they later moved to Luau. When Gil was four years old, her father died; when she was six, her mother also died, following which Gil was moved to a Catholic mission, before being cared for by her uncles.

== Career ==
=== Angolan War of Independence (1965–1975) ===
When Gil was 16 and living in Luau, she first heard the anti-colonial radio station Rádio Angola Combatente, and subsequently joined a regional cell of the People's Movement for the Liberation of Angola (MPLA). At the end of 1965, Gil moved to Dilolo, and later secretly to Kinshasa and then Brazzaville, the location of the MPLA's headquarters in exile. While she was in Dilolo, an officer from the United Nations Operation in the Congo changed her date of birth on her documents to 1945, making her legally an adult, so that she could freely travel around the First Congolese Republic. After receiving training and instructions from the MPLA, Gil travelled to Zambia where, under the supervision of Aníbal de Melo Camaxilo, she became a combatant in the Angolan War of Independence, being given the pseudonym Njinga Mbandi. Gil subsequently joined the People's Armed Forces of Liberation of Angola (EPLA), and began fighting on the frontlines in Bié Province. She was later appointed as the commander of the Fura-Mata group in Cazombo.

In 1967, the MPLA enrolled Gil onto a nursing course, which operated at Base Hanói II under the instruction of Américo Boavida and Manuel Gonçalo Ribeiro de Sousa. After graduating from the programme, Gil worked as an MPLA nurse until 1973, based within various maquis on the war's eastern front. In addition, she was also tasked with the organisation and logistics of the maquis.

In 1973, Gil was sent to work at the MPLA's base in Dar es Salaam, where she coordinated the training of military recruits at the EPLA's Eringa base in Tanzania. At this time, she also began working for the Organisation of Angolan Women.

=== Nursing career (1975–1977) ===
In 1975, Gil resumed her work providing medical and military assistance on the front line, including being assigned to provide nursing care to commander Aníbal de Melo Camaxilo in Luanda. After Angola gained its independence, Gil was appointed as a nursing coordinator at the Luanda Main Military Hospital, where she completed her formal nursing training.

=== Initial political career (1977–1987) ===
During the 1977 MPLA Congress, Gil was among three women, alongside Maria Mambo Café and Ruth Neto, who were elected to serve on the MPLA's Central Committee.

In 1980, Gil was appointed Secretary of Social Affairs, a ministerial position, succeeding Maria Vahekeni; she remained in post until 1987. During her time in government, Gil was able to organise logistics for widespread food distribution, and largely removed homelessness in Luanda through the provision of shelter, healthcare, and social reintegration services. Gil also called publicly for the social integration of combatants from the war.

In 1987, Gil left the Ministry of Social Action in order to begin her medical studies at Agostinho Neto University, though she did not complete her studies. In 1989, the MPLA sent her to study computer engineering at London Metropolitan University.

=== Interpolitical period (1987–2008) ===
After completing her studies in London, Gil returned to Angola, where she resumed her work with the Organisation of Angolan Women and was re-elected to the MPLA's Central Committee, working in the Disciplinary and Audit Commission. In 2006, Gil was one of the founders of the Tchiweka Documentation Association, a public body responsible for preserving and promoting Angolan history.

=== Later political career (2008–2014) ===
In the 2008 Angolan parliamentary election, Gil was elected as an MPLA member of parliament for the National Electoral District. As a member of the National Assembly, she was one of the signatories of the 2010 Angolan constitution. Gil returned to the Angolan Armed Forces, where she retired in 2014 as an army general. In 2015, she was awarded the Order of the Freedom Fighters.

=== Post-retirement (2014–present) ===
In 2015, Gil became the non-executive director of the public company Imprensa Nacional de Angola that publishes official periodicals. She was reappointed to the role in 2017 and 2023.

In December 2021, Gil was elected to the MPLA's Honorary Council.

== Personal life ==
Gil's first marriage was to Henriques Leonel Gama Gil, who was commander of the 4th Political-Military Region of the EPLA, covering Lunda Norte, Malanje and Uíge provinces, with whom she had four children. He was killed in combat in 1967 during the War of Independence following an ambush by the National Liberation Front of Angola.
