= Korhogo cloth =

Textile made in Korhogo, Ivory Coast

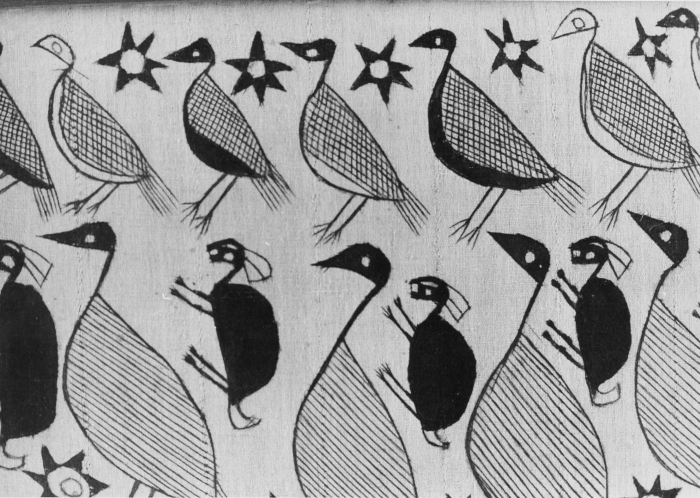
- Korhogo cloth, 1960–1970, National Museum of World Cultures, Netherlands
- Type: Painted cloth
- Material: Hand-spun cotton; mud-based dye
- Production method: Strip weaving on hand looms
- Production process: Hand painting
- Place of origin: Korhogo, Ivory Coast
- Introduced: Late 1960s – early 1970s
- Manufacturer: Senufo people

Korhogo cloth is a hand-painted African textile made by the Senufo people of the Korhogo area in northern Ivory Coast. Often described as standing in the shadow of bogolanfini (mud cloth) and kente, it comes in neutral, earthy tones such as browns, blacks and creams.

The designs – humans, animals and natural elements such as the sun, moon and stars – are painted with a fermented mud-based dye on hand-spun, hand-woven cotton, and draw on Senufo culture and mythology. The modern pictorial cloth developed in the late 1960s and early 1970s from an older striped cloth called fila, and is popular with tourists, urban Ivorians and interior designers abroad.

== Production ==
Painted cloth from Fakaha

Men and women share the work. Both cultivate the cotton; women spin it into yarn and prepare the dye, while men weave narrow strips of about 4 inches (10 cm) on hand looms, sew them into a large canvas and paint it. The first fine lines of the images are drawn with a knife, and designs are often traced with a stencil. The dye is made from swamp mud, decaying roots and boiled leaves; the iron in the mud binds to the fibres, and the colour darkens over time. Its strong smell before drying has earned the textile the nickname "dung cloth".

== History ==
The pictorial cloth grew out of fila, a cloth of six sewn-together cotton strips decorated mainly with painted stripes and zigzags symbolising the leopard. In the late 1960s and early 1970s, American Peace Corps volunteers encouraged Senufo makers to develop the cloth for a wider market, and it became popular with tourists and urban Ivorians. The cloths grew larger and their imagery more varied, and the Senufo began buying hand-woven strips from their Dyula neighbours. The earliest examples keep the fila strips as a grid for the painted motifs; by the early 1980s makers had abandoned the strips and used the whole cloth as the field for their designs. The cloth is now widely used in Europe and the United States, especially in interior design.

In January 2024, the Korhogo workspace of the cloth painters of Fakaha was demolished during road clearances ahead of the 2023 Africa Cup of Nations; their association asked to be relocated so that visitors could watch them paint.

== Uses and symbolism ==
Traditionally, the Senufo wore the cloth or hung it in homes and shrines as protection against vengeful spirits; it was commissioned for hunters, who wore it for protection and luck, and for rites of passage such as funerals. Today it is also used for clothing and decoration.

Makers use more than 80 motifs, which are combined to tell a story. Common symbols include:

- Guinea fowl: feminine beauty
- Chicken: maternity
- Goat: male prowess
- Trees: the sacred wood where Poro societies met
- Chameleon: death
- Fish: life and water
- Fish bones: drought
- Lion: royal power
- Hunter: mysteries of the forest
- Swallow: trust
- Crocodile and lizard: male fertility
- Snake and turtle: the earth
- Antelope: hope and good fortune
- Sun, moon and stars: the first elements created by God

== See also ==
- Ceremonial Drum of the Senufo People
- Senufo bird
