= Women in Ivory Coast =

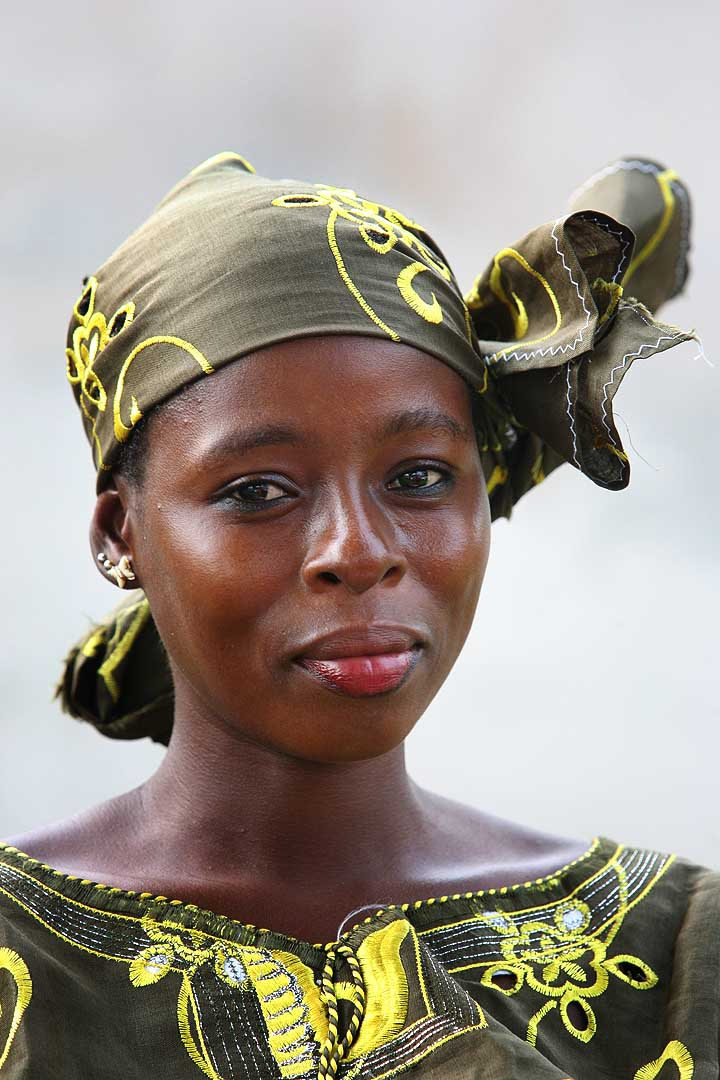
- Woman in Abidjan, Ivory Coast, 2007

General statistics
- Maternal mortality (per 100,000): 400 (2010)
- Women in parliament: 11.0% (2012)
- Women over 25 with secondary education: 13.7% (2010)
- Women in labour force: 51.8% (2011)

Gender Inequality Index
- Value: 0.613 (2021)
- Rank: 155th out of 191

Global Gender Gap Index
- Value: 0.632 (2022)
- Rank: 133rd out of 146

Women in Ivory Coast formed less than half the country's population in 2003. Their social roles and opportunities have changed since the time of French colonialism.

From independence in 1960, women's status under the law was inferior to that of men, and this continued until the 1990s. The legal changes following President's Félix Houphouët-Boigny death brought improvement in legal and educational opportunities for women at all levels, and women have been moving into the highest levels of business and government.

Cultural traditions and practices, too, have usually marked women for inferior status. While adherence to traditional roles persists, this continuity—as well as the traditions themselves—vary greatly with place and social context. Ivory Coast has more than 60 ethnic groups, usually classified into five principal divisions: Akan (east and center, including the "Lagoon peoples" of the southeast), Krou (southwest), Mandé (Mandé west and Mandé northwest groups), and Senufo-Lobi (north center and northeast). Each of these groups has its own traditional roles for women, as do the religions practised in the country (Christian 20–30 percent, Muslim 15–20 percent, indigenous 35–50 percent).

Today's northern Ivory Coast was at the periphery of the Mali Empire and the great medieval states of the Sahel, while with Portuguese (from the 1460s) and later French colonial expansion, women of the southern regions experienced wars of colonialism and resistance firsthand. In the 1970s, Ivory Coast was considered the economic leader of West Africa, but since the 1990s, poverty and conflict have increased, at times affecting women disproportionately. The interplay of all these experiences has transformed the social roles of women in Ivorian society.

The main issue of gender equality in Ivory Coast is education. According to CIA World Factbook, the literacy rate in Ivory Coast in total is 43.1%. 53.1% of males can read and write and only 32.5% of females can read and write. This shows that more than half of men can read, and less than half of women can read. It also states that the school life expectancy for males is ten years, whereas for girls it is eight years. So far, no specific organizations have helped women education in Ivory Coast. However, many organizations have helped education for women in Africa as a whole, such as Africa Education Trust and Aid for Africa.

In order for women's education to be as equal as the men's in Ivory Coast, the government must provide more schools for free, so that the people do not think about financial issues once they put their child at school, and so the parents can afford to put both their sons and daughters in school. Education is free in Ivory Coast, but the parents must provide the school supplies, which might be a challenge if they have more than one child (Our Africa). This might lessen the need for women to go to school. For this to happen, the people must inform the government and if they refuse, protest. Education is a basic right everyone should afford, no matter the gender.

== Women's roles on the eve of colonialism ==
Ethnic and cultural groups defined women's status in different ways on the eve of colonialism, with beliefs about the role of women in society partly the result of specific ethnic background and historical circumstance. It has been argued that Ivorian cultures largely had a cultural bias against equality between the sexes, embodied in customary law and codified in the colonial period. But this view has been challenged by Ivorian writers, who argue that in many pre-colonial societies, women held political and /or economic power equal to many men. Looking specifically at the N'Gongbo Baoulé people, one writer contrasts Ivorian women's roles the traditional Western tradition where the public and the private spheres are separated, with the superior public sphere reserved for men, and argues that Western intellectuals transpose this model onto "traditional" societies in Africa. Rather, the African experience is said to be characterized by coexistence of parallel positions, overlapping roles, and cross-gender cooperation.

Amongst the Mossi peoples, women's inheritance of family land and possessions, while uncommon, is possible.

Women of the Dyoula Mande peoples, living traditionally in scattered communities across in long-distance trade communities, were often powerful merchants in their own right.

The Gio or Dan people of the southwest regard domestic duties as the preserve of women, while many Mandinka women engage in farming and trade.

Women in bond labor communities, or those in cultures with strong caste systems found themselves doubly discriminated against.

From the 12th century, but progressing more deeply into the north of Ivory Coast from the 16th century, Islam defined the status of women in Muslim communities. Polygamy, practised among most Mande peoples since pre-Islamic days, was codified under Islam, which offered both protections and disadvantages. In Mande Muslim communities, the first wife has authority over any subsequent wives, sharing domestic work, and caring for the extended family, into which the wives' parents may be folded into the husbands family.

Finally, the African slave trade, beginning in the 15th century destroyed whole communities, with women killed in slave raiding and associated warfare and those enslaved separated from families, and transported to the Americas (or to neighboring states) in brutal conditions. The beginning of the direct colonial period in the 19th century brought general dislocation, warfare, and large population movements, especially in the southern forest zones of West Africa, as the French moved in from the West and South in the 1860s–90s.

== Under French colonialism ==
=== Colonial law and women ===
Role expectations for women were altered somewhat by colonial legislation, which liberated captives throughout francophone Africa in 1903, and then by the Mandel Decree of 1939, which fixed the minimum age of marriage at fourteen and made mutual consent a formal necessity for marriage. These decrees, while promulgated by colonial officials, affected rural areas only fleetingly. Bonded and caste communities remained in serfdom like conditions until at least the World War I period, when a series of population movements and communal resistance changed many of these dependence relationships. Wars during the early colonial period caused an increase in slave taking, in which women were separated from men and moved into new communities. The Jacquinot Decree of 1951 invoked the power of the state to protect women from claims to their services—by their own or their husband's family—after marriage, and enabled women to obtain a divorce more easily and invalidated in-laws' claims to any bride-price that had been paid to a woman's family to legitimize the marriage. This decree also recognized monogamy as the only legal form of marriage and allowed couples to marry without parental consent. Small numbers of girls were offered primary education by the French government (in urban areas), while Catholic missions, offered education to others, especially in the south.

At the same time, almost the entire population of the colony were colonial Subjects, ruled under the French Code de l'Indigénat. In practice, this meant that women, like men, were ruled by decrees from a handful of French Cercle Commanders, who administered with little oversight, and carried out policies through a series of French appointed "Canton chiefs". "Customary" law, outside Muslim areas, was usually rule decided by appointed chiefs and their officials, while only whites and a tiny number of educated African men were subject to French courts. Whatever decrees issued at the colonial capital in Dakar were implemented at the discretion of local commanders, who usually preferred to leave social concerns to chiefs.

=== Colonial dislocation ===
Women were especially affected by three colonial practices that increased in the early 20th century: forced labor, taxation, and military draft. All of French West Africa was subject to periodic forced labor campaigns, which peaked in the 1930s, and declined thereafter. Ivory Coast was unique, though, in that the north of the colony had white run cotton plantations, for which locals were pressed into service when migrant labor (mostly from modern Burkina Faso) was unavailable. Unlike road building or other forced labor projects, for which men were called up for a period ranging from days to months, men (and some women) were pressed into cotton work for years at a time. While only a small number of women were drafted into French labor schemes, the process of taking men out of their communities for long periods of time meant that women were forced to provide for their communities. This, from the beginning of the 20th century, also meant some involvement in the marketplace, as French colonial taxation (in currency) superseded taxation in kind from the 1930s to 1950s. Women were also placed in positions of independence due to the recruitment of African troops (the Tirailleurs) which was especially heavy in Ivory Coast during the World Wars. Men who survived these experiences came home less likely to accept the strictures of colonial or customary rule, and while they were away, women were forced to provide for, and sometimes lead, communities.

=== Independence struggle ===
The political struggle for independence after the Second World War was organized around the Rassemblement Démocratique Africain (RDA), whose Ivorian section was led by Félix Houphouët-Boigny. After his break with the French Communist Party in 1950, under pressure from the French administration, many of the socially progressive planks of the RDA platform were dropped, and once in power, many legal advantages given to women (in law alone) were reversed. Women played little role in the formal leadership of the RDA, yet women were crucial in demanding independence from France.

At the grassroots, women played an active role in the independence struggle across French West Africa. One dramatic example occurred in 1949, when protests by local women in Grand Bassam and Abidjan caused the administration to back down from the detention of RDA leaders, and help spread support for the party at a time in which it was facing severe repression.

== Post-independence ==
At independence, the government of President Félix Houphouët-Boigny acknowledged existing decrees affecting the status of women and went on to establish the primacy of the nuclear family, raise the minimum age for marriage to eighteen, and condemn in general terms the notion of female inferiority. At the same time, however, legislation during the 1960s established a husband's right to control much of his wife's property, and it required a woman to obtain her husband's permission to establish a bank account or obtain a job. The government also placed restrictions on a woman's right to divorce, denied legal recognition of matrilineal rights of inheritance (inheritance by a man's nephews before his sons), and finally, condemned the practice of bride-price.

Houphouët-Boigny's political style and longevity shaped Ivorian elites into a wealthy, male, educated social stratum. By the late 1980s, women were beginning to emerge within this group, as education and acculturation enabled them to challenge the established order. Official attitudes toward the status of women were pragmatic, like most official attitudes in Ivory Coast.

In 1963 women reacted to the extent and direction of government control by forming the Association of Ivoirian Women (Association des Femmes Ivoiriennes—AFI). They also persuaded the president to establish the Ministry of Women's Affairs (Ministère de la Condition Féminine, later the Ministre de la solidarité et de la Promotion de la Femme) in 1976 and to appoint AFI leader Jeanne Gervais as minister. Gervais's goals were to obtain better educational and employment opportunities for women and to establish judicial equality for women. Legislation was enacted in 1983 to allow a woman to control some of her property after marriage and to appeal to the courts for redress of a husband's actions.

== Civil War ==
Women were greatly affected by the Ivorian Civil War, begun in September 2002, but coming on the heels of a decade of internal conflict. The growth of the concept of Ivoirité, a 1990s nationalist movement which sought to exclude large portions of the population from "true" citizenship, was both championed by and caused the suffering of women. Changes in nationality law meant that women married to Ivorian born men no longer considered citizens lost their citizenship as well. On the other side, some women leaders were prominent exponents of Ivoirité, most notably Simone Gbagbo, the wife of the president.

Once the war broke out into open conflict in 2002, women formed 52 percent of the estimated 700,000 Internally displaced persons during the war, while rape and sexual violence were widespread, especially in the north and west of the country. Both rebel and government forces have been accused of systemic sexual violence towards women as a tactic to terrorise populations suspected of opposition to their forces. Women suffering the effects of such violence are often shunned, while customary law offers few remedies, and the formal court system has largely failed to prosecute perpetrators. Women have found themselves forced into prostitution in the wake of economic collapse in war-torn areas.

Even with the coming of relative peace in 2004, sexual violence remained a significant problem throughout both rebel- and government-held areas.

The civil war also was a venue for women's active participation. Both sides had special women's political organisations, most active of which are "Cadre de concertation permanent des femmes" (Ccpf) led by Dao Coulibaly Henriette, and the "Coordination of Patriotic Women of Côte d'Ivoire" ("Coordination des femmes patriotes de Côte d'Ivoire" - CFPCI). A pro government group, the CFPCI is led by former Sports Minister Geneviève Bro-Grebé, and allied to the "Young Patriots" student organisation, itself accused of fomenting violence against those perceived as disloyal to the government, including rape. Women's political organisations continue to be very publicly involved in the sometimes rocky peace process which brought rebel leader Guillaume Soro into power sharing with the government.

Closer to the ground, Ivorian and international organisations have attempted to serve women suffering the effects of war, including one of Africa's first women-run local sexual violence recovery centers in the northern town of Man.

== Recent years ==
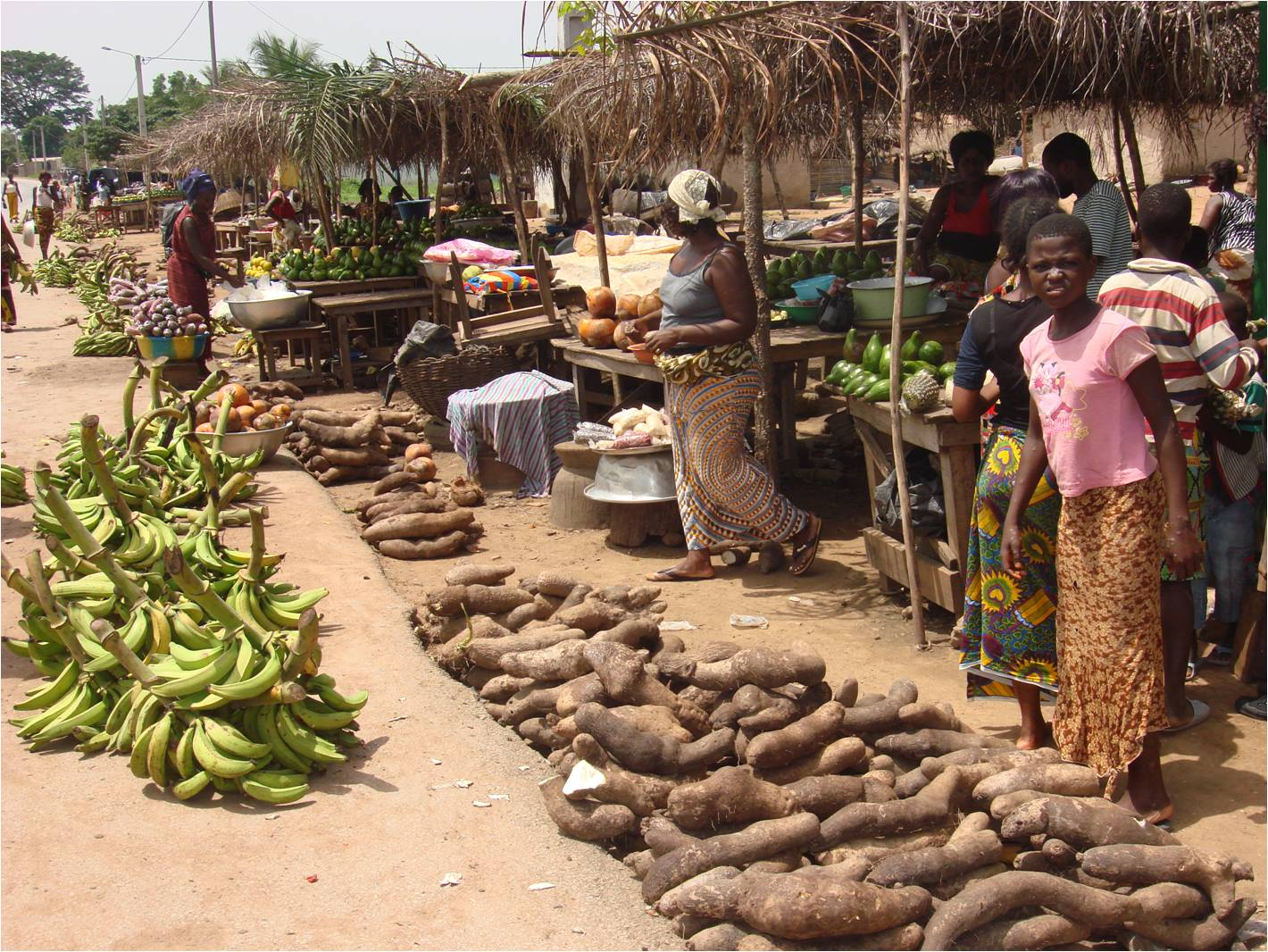
In spite of the ubiquity of women selling products in markets like this, Ivorian women are only half as likely to be in regular employment as men.

Through most of the 1980s, the status of women, in practice and in the law, was still well below that of men, but educational opportunities for women were improving at all levels. In 1987 about one-sixth of the students at the National University of Ivory Coast were women, and the number of women in the salaried workforce had also increased. As of the late 1980s, women made up almost one-fourth of the civil service and held positions previously closed to them, in medicine, law, business, and university teaching.

=== Politics ===
While prominent women take leadership roles in politics, their numbers are minimal. The first female parliamentarian was elected in 1965, and only 5.7 percent of parliamentary seats were held by women in 1990, and 8.5 percent in 2005. These women are disproportionally appointed to oversee ministerial portfolios (17.1 percent of ministerial posts in 2005). At the highest political level, the wife of current President, Simone Gbagbo, holds a powerful position as head of the ruling party's parliamentary bloc, and has been frequently spoken of as future head of state or Prime Minister.

== Women's Rights ==
=== Demographics ===
The total population of Ivory Coast consists of more males than females. The life expectancy of males at birth is roughly the same as that of females (female: 41.2; male: 40.8). This marks a downward trend since 1990, when average life expectancy was 53.4 for women and 49.6 for men.

==== Comparative rankings ====
Since 1995, the United Nations Development Program has been keeping Gender-related Development Index (GDI), a ranking of aggregate statistics of development, with focus on gender inequality. Ivory Coast has consistently ranked in the lowest quarter of the GDI, dropping to 166 of 177 in 2007, from 145 in 2005. Out of the 156 countries with both HDI and GDI values, 150 countries have a better ratio than Ivory Coast's. This movement is in line with Ivory Coast's Human Development Index trend, which peaked in 1985, and has dropped ever since. While leading neighbors like Mali and Niger, Ivory Coast consistently lags Senegal, Ghana, and The Gambia. In comparison to Senegal and France, female life expectancy at birth is around 60 percent of French totals, and 14.1 years less than Senegal, but this trend roughly mirrors male life expectancy at birth. Adult literacy rates are higher than Senegal's, but current female enrollment as a percentage of males is now less, and estimated earned income for females in Ivory Coast is dramatically less, while Ivorian men may expect to earn more than their Senegalese neighbors. A Senegalese man (per person/year) will be expected to earn US$2,346, and a Senegalese woman US$1,256, while an Ivorian man will average US$2,472, but Ivorian women average just US$795. As of 2004, Ivory Coast's combined primary, secondary and tertiary gross enrollment ratio (female enrollment as a percentage male) trails Niger and Eritrea, even though its total percentage of children enrolled is much higher.

=== Reproductive health ===
2005 estimates are that the average Ivorian woman gives birth to 4.73 children, and 690 women per 100,000 die in childbirth. While maternal mortality and fertility rates are declining, they are far above those of developed countries. Child mortality has in fact increased since 1990, with 101.3 children out of every 1000 live births dying before the age of five in 2005, an increase from 97.2 in 1990. 43.5 percent of women are married by the age of 18 (median: 19.8 for women, 27.6 for men), while the median age at first sexual intercourse for women is 16.1 years. 115.6 per 1000 women aged 15–20 have given birth. Only 53 percent of women aged 15–24 know that condom use can protect them from HIV.

There are stark disparities in women's lives in rural areas versus urban areas. Women in rural communities are more likely to be married younger, give birth, and see children die in their first five years than urban women. In rural areas 41 percent women between the ages of 15 and 19 will give birth to their first child, with only 32.1 percent aided by a skilled attendant, in contrast to 18.9 percent of urban women of this age group giving birth, and 79.1 percent with birthing aid.

=== Literacy ===
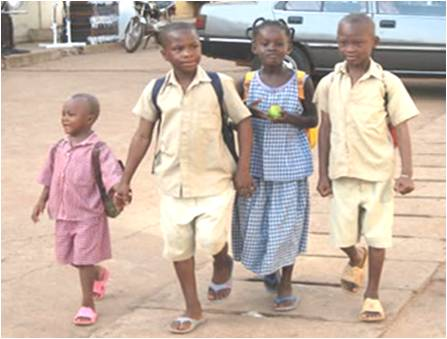
Boys and girls head to school in a northern town. Illiteracy rates for females, while still well above males, have dropped since 1990.

Female literacy trails that of males, though both are low by developed nation standards, at 50.9 percent overall, 57.9 percent male literacy, and 43.6 percent female literacy. 2005 illiteracy rates for females, while still well above males, has dropped since 1990 (74 percent to 57 percent for females 15 and over, 49 percent to 36 percent for males 15 and over). Females between 15 and 24 saw their illiteracy rate drop from 60 percent to 41 percent in this period (35 percent to 26 percent for males). School enrolment for girls still lags boys, with 68 percent of primary-school-aged and 17 percent of secondary-school-aged girls enrolled (89 percent and 30 percent for boys). The poorest children of both sexes are less likely to receive schooling, yet even in the top wealth quintile only 70.7 percent of girls aged 6–10 attend school (82.9 percent for boys). This falls to 48 percent in the next lowest rung for girls (62.2 percent for boys).

== See also ==
- Women in Africa
