= Cuíto =

Cuíto Silva Porto
- Municipality
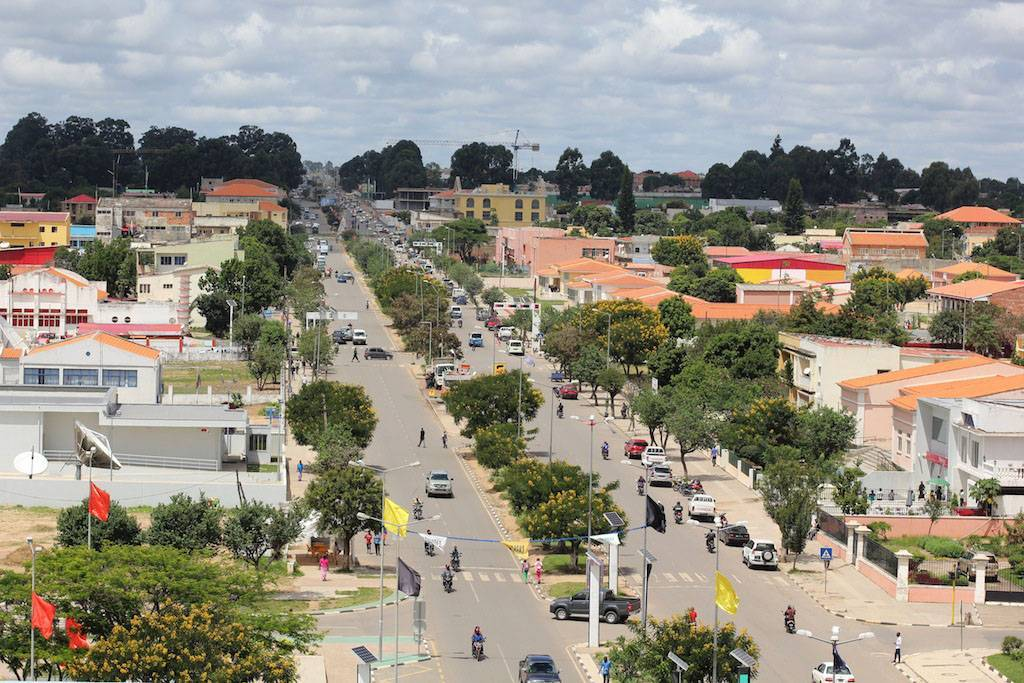

- Location in Angola
- Coordinates: 12°23′S 16°56′E
- Country: Angola
- Province: Bié Province
- Founded: 1750

Area
  - Municipality: 1,560 km^{2} (600 sq mi)
- Elevation: 1,695 m (5,561 ft)

Population (2014 Census)
  - Municipality: 450,881
  - Density: 289/km^{2} (749/sq mi)
  - Urban: 355,423
- Time zone: UTC+1 (WAT)
- Area code: (+244) 48
- Climate: Cwb

Cuíto, formerly known as Silva Porto, is a city and municipality in central Angola, capital of Bié Province. The municipality had a population of 450,881 in 2014. The city is projected to be the tenth fastest growing city on the African continent between 2020 and 2025, with a 5.56% growth rate.

== History ==
The city of Cuíto is built in the historical heart of the Ovimbundu kingdom. The ruler of the Ovimbundu was named Viye and he married a Songo woman named Cahanda. Together they built the city and later the Portuguese would name the Bié Province after the ruler. The Ovimbundu were known for selling captives from neighbouring tribes to the European slave traders which made the area an ideal location for the slave business and brought colonists to the area. The Portuguese "founded" the city in 1750. They later called it Silva Porto after António da Silva Porto who built his home embala Belmonte in the area. The pleasant climate in the Bié Province was attractive to Portuguese settlers and many made their home in Silva Porto in the early 1900s when the Benguela Railway connected the city to the coast.

Cuíto had a long history of violence starting with the African slave trade and tribal warfare. Later in the 1960s the Portuguese used the town of Silva Porto as a training centre for training black Portuguese Army soldiers to send to Northern Portuguese Angola in order to fight the nationalist guerrillas, during the Portuguese Colonial War.

After independence from Portugal in 1975, Cuíto saw its worst times on 6 January 1993 when UNITA, during the Angolan Civil War, laid siege of the city for over 9 months and over 30,000 people were killed, both from war effects and starvation. Nobody was permitted to enter or leave the city for 9 months and the city suffered heavy damage. UNITA was eventually driven from Cuíto and a second attempt was made to capture the city in 1998 using huge artillery and tanks.

== Climate ==
Cuíto has a monsoon-influenced temperate oceanic climate (Cwb) according to the Köppen climate classification. The city sits on the eastern flank of the Bie Plateau. Due to its elevation, the climate is unusually cool for its tropical location with an average annual temperature of 18 °C or 64.4 °F. The coolest period is May to August when almost no rain falls. September and October are the hottest months with a little rain. Heavy rain falls in the main rainy season November to April.

Climate data for Cuíto
Month	Jan	Feb	Mar	Apr	May	Jun	Jul	Aug	Sep	Oct	Nov	Dec	Year
Record high °C (°F)	29 (84)	28 (82)	28 (82)	29 (84)	28 (82)	27 (81)	27 (81)	30 (86)	31 (88)	31 (88)	29 (84)	28 (82)	31 (88)
Mean daily maximum °C (°F)	25 (77)	24 (75)	24 (75)	24 (75)	24 (75)	23 (73)	24 (75)	26 (79)	28 (82)	26 (79)	24 (75)	23 (73)	25 (77)
Daily mean °C (°F)	19 (66)	19 (66)	19 (66)	18 (64)	17 (63)	14 (57)	15 (59)	17 (63)	20 (68)	19 (66)	19 (66)	18 (64)	18 (64)
Mean daily minimum °C (°F)	14 (57)	14 (57)	15 (59)	13 (55)	10 (50)	6 (43)	7 (45)	9 (48)	12 (54)	13 (55)	14 (57)	14 (57)	12 (54)
Record low °C (°F)	3 (37)	7 (45)	5 (41)	0 (32)	−1 (30)	−5 (23)	0 (32)	0 (32)	3 (37)	6 (43)	6 (43)	5 (41)	−5 (23)
Average rainfall mm (inches)	193 (7.6)	196 (7.7)	203 (8.0)	76 (3.0)	10 (0.4)	0 (0)	0 (0)	3 (0.1)	23 (0.9)	109 (4.3)	193 (7.6)	221 (8.7)	1,227 (48.3)
Source: weatherbase.com

== Transportation ==
Cuíto is served by the Benguela railway that once connected the inland provinces to the coast. The actual railway station serving Cuíto is located a few kilometers north of the town.

There are also direct flights from Luanda out of the Joaquim Kapango Airport.

== Notable residents ==
- Rodeth Gil (born 1948), soldier and nurse during the War of Independence.

== See also ==
- Railway stations in Angola
