= Senufo bird =

Type of hat used in Poro ceremonies

In the initiation ceremonies of the Poro of Sierra Leone and Ivory Coast, a Senufo bird is a hat worn by men or carried in a procession, especially during an initiation ceremony. Between uses it is kept the Poro’s secret tree grove. The base is hollowed out underneath so that it may fit like a cap on the head. However, many of the birds stand on cylindrical bases that seem to be designed to rest upon the ground.

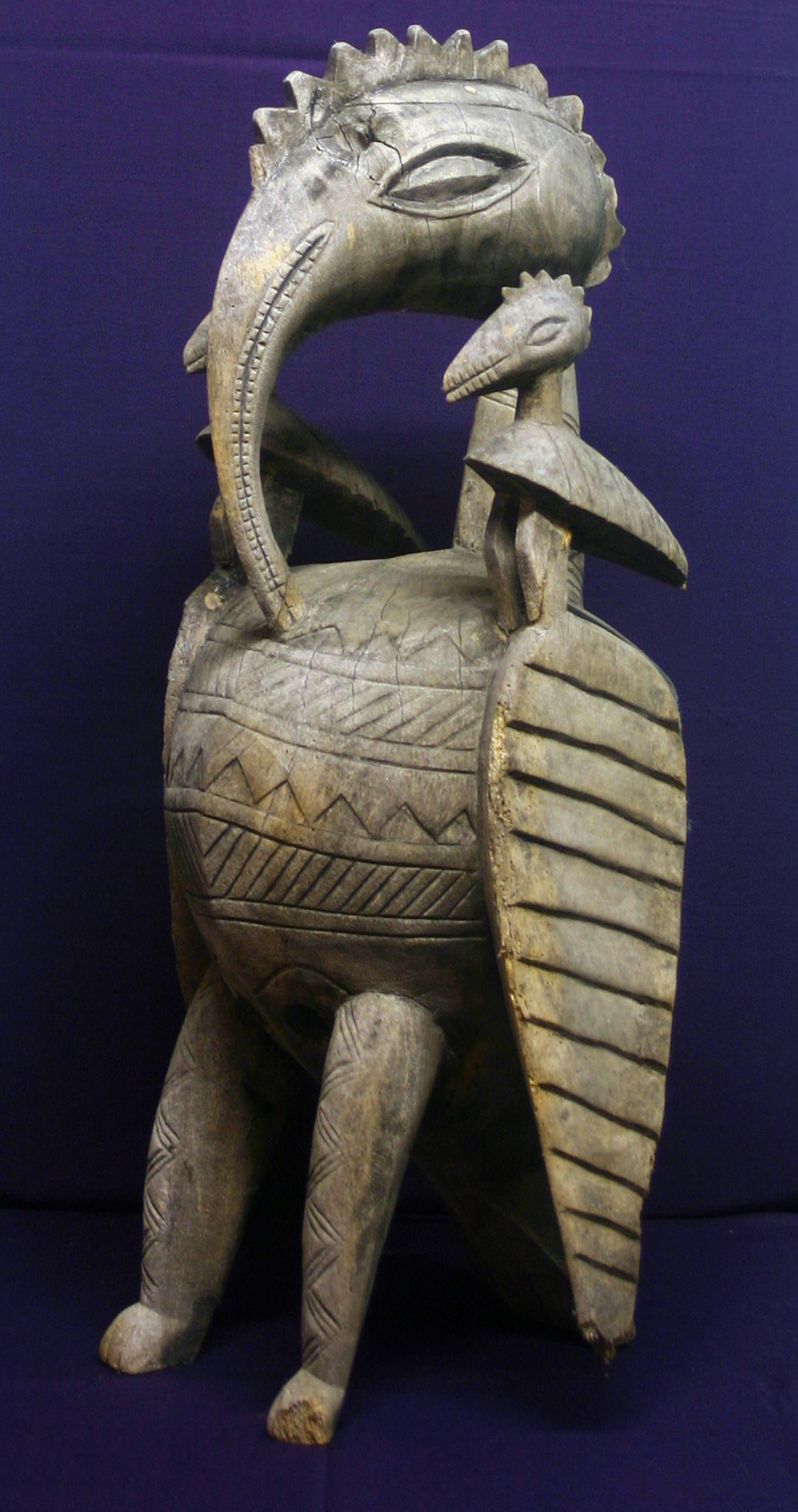
A wooden Senufo bird

The Senufo "is said to symbolize fertility, increase and the continuity of the community."

According to Senufo belief, the hornbill was one of the first living creatures.

The long phallic beak touching its swollen belly suggesting pregnancy, represents the dual forces of the male and female parts.

== See also ==
- Ceremonial Drum of the Senufo People
- Korhogo cloth
