= Aïssata Coulibaly (activist) =

Aïssata Coulibaly (March 1, 1920 – c. 1967), also known as Aïssata Sow Coulibaly, was a Malian trade unionist, activist, and educator.

== Early life and education ==
Aïssata Coulibaly was born in 1920 in Kati, in what was then French Sudan, now Mali.

In 1932, she was sent to be educated at the Foyer des métisses de Bamako, one of the few schools for girls in the region. After graduating, she was accepted at Senegal's École normale de Rufisque in 1939. She earned her diploma in 1945, becoming only the eighth French Sudanese teacher to graduate.

== Career ==
After completing her teacher training, Coulibaly was sent to work at a school in Ouahigouya before transferring back to Bamako, where she would serve as director of the École des filles de la Poudrière de Bamako until 1965.

She also became engaged in labor activism, gaining recognition as an important figure in the regional trade union movement in the 1950s. In 1956, she represented French Sudan at the World Federation of Trade Unions' first World Conference of Women Workers in Hungary. On her return, she worked to found the Comité des femmes travailleuses (Committee of Women Workers) in November of that year, serving as secretary-general of the organization.

Around the same time, she also became active in the World Peace Movement-affiliated Mouvement soudanais de la Paix (Sudanese Peace Movement). In 1957, she became a vice president of the movement, the only woman among its leadership. She was also involved in the effort for independence from France, campaigning against the 1958 French Sudan constitutional referendum, which brought about the intermediary step of a French Community rather than immediate decolonization.

Having co-founded the Union des femmes de l'Ouest africain in 1959, three years later, she became a founding member of the Pan-African Women's Organization.

== Personal life, death, and legacy ==
Coulibaly was married to fellow labor activist and Sudanese Union – African Democratic Rally politician Lamine Sow, and she was sometimes known by her married name, Aïssata Sow Coulibaly. The couple had seven children. While her husband went on to become a government minister after Mali's independence, she largely shifted into a background role, likely due to health issues.

She died around 1967 in Bamako, Mali. In 1971, she was posthumously recognized for her work as an educator by the Moussa Traoré government with the Malian Silver Star of National Merit With Bee.
