= Martine Djibo =

Ivorian educator and politician (died 2022)

Member of Parliament for Bouaké
- In office 1990–2010
- In office 1975–1980

Personal details
- Died: 30 October 2022 Abidjan, Ivory Coast
- Party: PURCI (after 2004); PDCI-RDA (until 2004)

Martine Aya Djibo (died 30 October 2022) was an Ivorian educator and politician who served in the National Assembly from 1975 until 1980 and from 1990 until 2010. Although initially a member of the PDCI-RDA party, she defected in 2004 and founded the Party for the Unity of the Republic of Côte d'Ivoire, citing frustrations with the party amid the First Ivorian Civil War.

== Career ==
Djibo began her teaching career in the central city of Bouaké. After initially teaching Spanish at Martin Luther King College and CEG Koko, she later became the director of the Modern College for Young Girls. A member and activist of the Democratic Party of Ivory Coast – African Democratic Rally (PDCI-RDA), Djibo was appointed to the National Assembly by President Félix Houphouët-Boigny in 1975, becoming the first woman to represent Bouaké. Djibo served in parliament until 1980.

After leaving parliament, Djibo resumed her teaching career; in 1985, she became the principal of the Municipal College of Bouaké, and in 1988, she was appointed principal of the newly-opened Djibo Sounkalo Municipal High School by Education Minister Balla Kéita. In the 1990 Ivorian parliamentary election, Djibo was elected back into parliament for the same constituency. In 1996, she sat as the Ivory Coast's representative on the council of the Inter-Parliamentary Union. At some point during this period, she also served on the politburo of the PDCI-RDA.

During her tenure in the 2000s, Djibo was a supporter of President Laurent Gbagbo. In 2004, she was critical of politicians who aligned with rebels fighting against Gbagbo's government in the First Ivorian Civil War, stating that Gbagbo was "elected and chosen by the people". On 12 December 2004, due to frustrations with her party and the ongoing civil war, Djibo defected from the PDCI-RDA and founded a new party, the Party for the Unity of the Republic of Côte d'Ivoire (PURCI). Serving as the party's president, Djibo stated that the party would be centered on "the triptych [of] love, unity and peace". PURCI was a member of the National Resistance Congress for Democracy coalition.

Djibo supported the 2007 Ouagadougou Peace Agreement, praising Gbagbo's role in ending the civil war and stating that the agreement was proof that "Africans in general and Ivorians in particular can think for themselves and find a solution to their problem" without European interference. However, in the leadup to the 2010 Ivorian presidential election, Djibo was opposed to the presence of Burkinabe soldiers in the Ivory Coast, a provision of the peace agreement to ensure election security. Djibo stated that the country already had peacekeepers from the United Nations and France, and that the presence of the Burkinabe soldiers was suspicious. Djibo also accused the Independent Electoral Commission of tampering with voter rolls, and demanded an audit which would reinstate anyone who was removed. Djibo served in parliament until 2010 and retired from politics, citing health issues.

Djibo was an officer of the French National Order of Merit, and served as the president of the Association of Ivorian Women. She died on 30 October 2022 at the Polyclinique internationale Sainte-Anne-Marie in Abidjan, after suffering from a long illness.
