= World Conference of Women Workers =

Postcard from the first World Conference of Women Workers (1956)

The World Conference of Women Workers is a feminist event organized by the World Federation of Trade Unions. During the conferences, activists from all over the world get together and draft recommendations for the World Federation of Trade Unions and the International Labour Organization. Their goal is the inclusion of women within the labor movement and the improvement of their working conditions.

The first World Conference of Women Workers took place in Budapest in 1956, the second in Bucarest in 1964, the third one in Dakar in 2023.

== Origins ==
=== Political context ===
The first World Conference of Women Workers was organized in 1956 in Hungary, which put together its first National Conference of Women Workers in 1947. During the 1950s, the labor movement was centered around men and focussed on worker's rights within a capitalist system.

However, women worker's rights were important for labor unions with communist leanings or legacy: their goal was both to become attractive to women so that they would unionize, and to educate unionized women in order to make them activists in the labor movement. At the time, union women were doing the best they could to fight for gender equality within the movement.

The first Conference took place in june 1956, a few months before the Hungarian Revolution against the communist government. In this context, women's rights weren't a priority for the State. Labor unions were the only way for the women of Hungary to fight for their rights.

=== Beginnings ===
The project was first suggested by Benoît Frachon, the head of the General Confederation of Labour, a french labor union who was a member of the World Federation of Trade Unions (WFTU). The concept was debated during the 1954 WFTU assembly. At first, the WFTU chose the city of Vienna to host the even, but in the end Budapest was selected. The WFTU was worried about the rise of political tension in Europe and thought it would result in a third World War. According to Louis Saillant, director of the WFTU at the time, it was of utmost importance to promote unity between labor unions and both unionized and non-unionized workers to face the eventuality of warfare.

The WFTU made a point of integrating African women workers in the Conference. Louis Saillant,

Madeleine Colin and Germaine Guillé were put in charge of their recruitment, which was difficult because Europeans didn't know much about working conditions in Africa, and it wasn't easy for African unionized women to travel to Europe in order to relay their experience.

Nina Popova, then president of the Antifascist Committee of Soviet Women supported the project. Multiple union delegates from Eastern Europe, Africa and Asia were invited to participate in the preparatory assemblies. Maddalena Grassi, head of the WFTU Women's Committee, was particularly active during this stage.

=== Ideology ===
Poster from the General Union of Textile Workers where a woman worker adresses people looking at the drawing : "Your labor union activist doesn't scare us anymore; thanks to him, we won!" (1916)

The WTFU promoted a bottom-up organization and the "action in unity" principle, meaning cooperation between unions regardless of their political leanings. The WFTU clearly stated that the delegates sent to the conference were to be selected regardless of their personal or official political affiliation, or status within their respective unions. The point was to create a network of activists who shared similar goals, and to undermine political rivalry between union leaders.

In archived documents, Luigi Grassi (politico 1891) wrote that the conference's objectives were to gather women from capitalist, socialist and colonized countries in order for them to compare their living and working conditions, and hopefully to become allies and friends. The long-term goals were also to give women an incentive to unionize and encourage labor unions to create outreach programmes tailored to recruit more women.

Publicly, the WFTU gave three main reasons for the creation of the Conference : to fight against wage disparity between men and women, to fight for world peace and to fight along colonized countries for their independence.

Conscious of Cold War tensions, the WFTU was also looking to temper political tensions by promoting international female friendship. The Federation was trying to get powerful labor unions to fight together for something they all thought to be important: the end of gender inequality in the attribution of wages. All labor unions could get behind this fight because the female workforce was traditionally used to replace men when they tried to fight for better working conditions. Making women's wages the same as men's would decrease the attractiveness of this practice.

== The first Conference (1956) ==
=== 14th-16th of june 1956 ===
Cover of a french magazine with illustrations representing the Word Conference of Women Workers (1955)

The first Conference took place between the 14th and the 16th of June 1956. 40 to 49 Nation States were representated and around 500 activists came together in Budapest.

The delegates who were invited didn't always have leading roles in their unions, but instead were chosen to relay their colleague's experience and concerns. The WFTU pushed working women from Hungary to the forefront, and made them to be a perfect example of socialist progress. This role prevented them from talking about their actual issues in Hungary. The goal for the WFTU was to show capitalist and colonized countries the superiority of socialist systems for workers. This silencing of women's voice was remarked upon by the Hungarian delegate during the Conference.

The Conference was made up of debates and presentations explaining women's conditions in labor unions. Those reports also suggested ways for unions to adapt to women. The most well rounded account was presented by Tsune Deushi and suggested the following :

- better inclusion of women in high ranking roles in labor unions, both nationally and internationally
- better access to labor union schools for women
- creating more childcare centers in labor union buildings so that women activists could become more involved in the movement.

=== Consequences ===
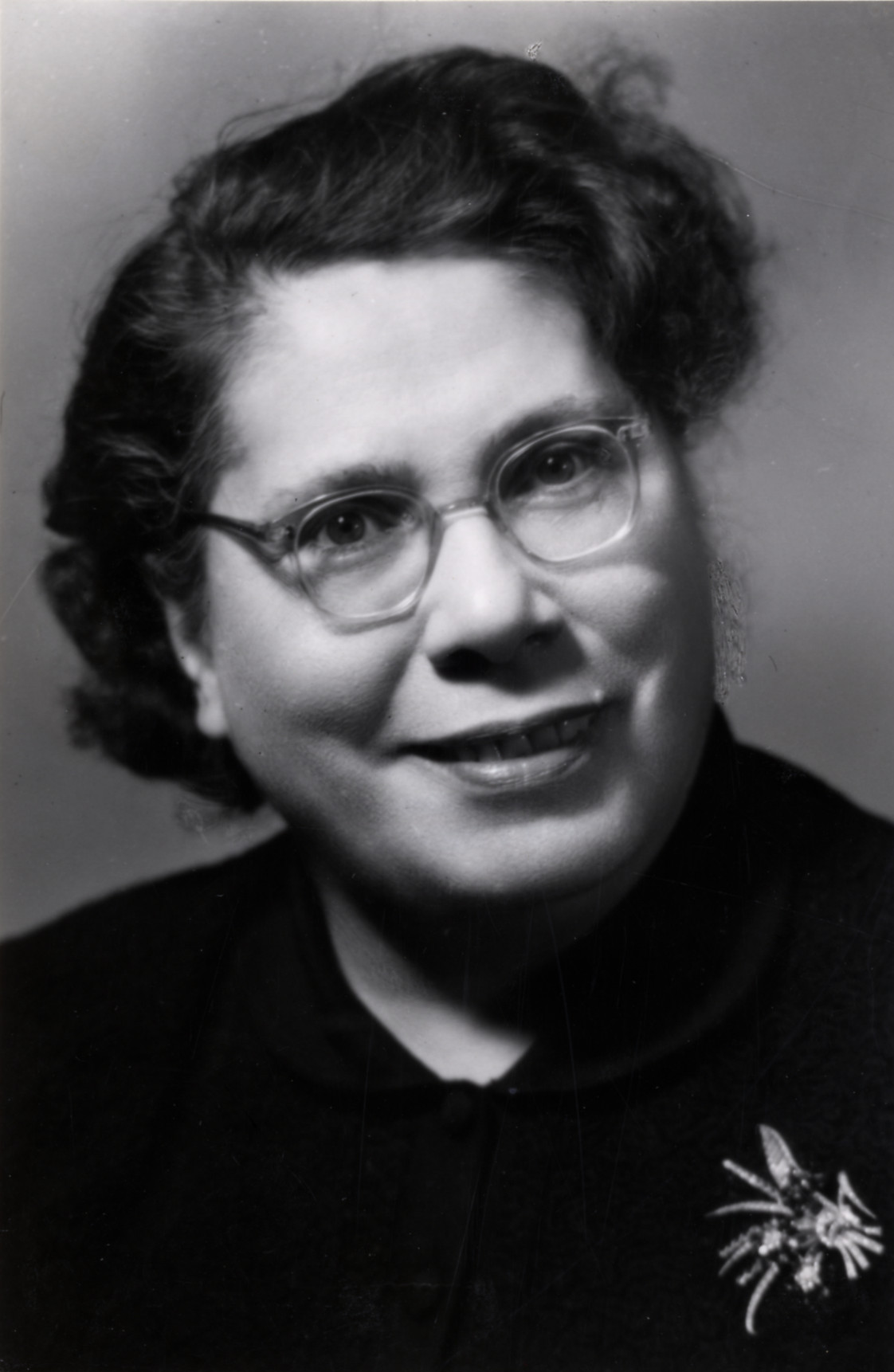
Teresa Noce

Following the Conference, the WFTU took multiple resolutions to reform labor unions in order to include more women. The most important decision was to elect more women in positions of power, which was starting to happen more and more in the 1950s. Women activists became leaders in the WFTU : Elena Teodorescu for Romania, Maddalena Grassi and Teresa Noce for Italy, Germaine Guillé for France. Within the WFTU, the fight for women's rights wasn't personalized in a single key figure because its members changed regularly. Madeleine Colin, however, was a particularly successful activist for working women's rights at the time.

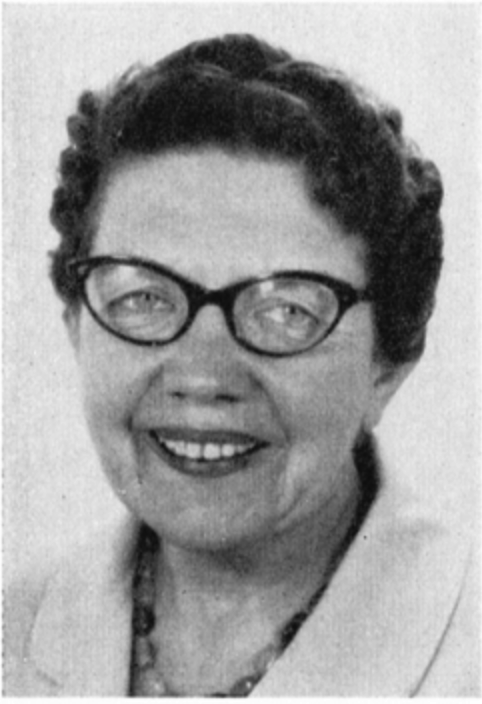
Sigrid Ekendahl (1959)

The second decision was to make women's work an international priority in policy-making. To act on this, the WFTU had an audition with the head of the International Labour Organization (ILO) in which they asked for the creation of a Women's Committee.

Other decisions included :

- integrating women's rights in the fight for worker's rights
- creating union seminaries specifically for women
- launching recruitment campaigns targeted towards working women.

After the Conference, Sigrid Ekendahl asked the International Confederation of Free Trade Unions to recruit someone who would be in charge of educating union leaders about best practices regarding women worker's inclusion. Marcelle Dehareng was chosen in 1957 to fulfill this role.

In order to select delegates, and following their return home, two women-only worker's unions were created : the Senegalese Women's Union and the Committee of Working Women in french Sudan.

=== Known participants ===
- Jorgelina Martínez (Uruguay)
- Delia Maldonado (Uruguay)
- Anna Leydet (France)
- Simone Cabasud (France)
- Justine Ranivosoa (Madagascar)
- Suzanne Sousadte (Gabon)
- Paulette Kassy (Ivory Coast)
- Marion Liandrat (France)
- Elli Tattari (Finland)
- Andrée Jeanny (France)
- Fatou Diarra (Senegal)
- Aïssata Coulibaly (french Sudan)
- Émilie Ngo-Toum (Cameroon)
- Jeanne Martin Cissé (Guinea)
- Catherine (Kath) Williams (Australia)
- Cecilia Shelley (Australia)
- Esther Taylor (Australia)
- Flo Davis (Australia)

== The second Conference (1964) ==
The second World Conference of Women Workers happened in May 1964 in Bucharest. In this Conference, women from socialist countries were allowed more freedom to talk about their issues at home.

After the event, the WFTU adopted a charter of social and economic rights for women workers, which included the improvement of women's literacy and programmes to secure better jobs. The Federation also created an International Committee for Women Workers, and tried to convince the ILO to apply a list of resolutions decided upon by women delegates in the Conference. Those decisions regarded better access to vocational training for women, freedom to choose one's job, the recognition of women's experience on a job, etc. Another Committee for women was created within the ILO to represent women's interests.

The decisions agreed upon during the Conference protected mothers and married women specifically because they were most impacted by gender inequality in the workforce.

=== Known participants ===
- Louisette Blanquart (France)
- Júlia Turgonyi (Hungary)
- Sri Ambar Rukmiati (Central All-Indonesian Workers Organization)

== The third Conference (2023) ==
The third World Conference of Women Workers took place on the 22nd and 23rd of November 2023 in Dakar. During the event the WFTU elected the new members of their Women's Committee. The Conference was presided over by Pambis Kyritsis, Cinzia della Porta and Awa Sy, all WFTU cadres.

The Conference was very aware of the worldwide rise of far-right politics, and suggested to look at women worker's rights as a way to protect all workers, regardless of gender. Debates centered around remote work and reproductive labor, as well as the gender dynamics of allied health professionals.

=== Known participants ===
- Amanda Verrone (LAB)
- Suzan Abdel-Salam (Palestine)
