= École normale de Rufisque =

Location
- Rufisque; Senegal; 14.7136°N 17.2722°W

Information
- Type: Teacher training
- Established: 1938
- Closed: 1958

The École normale de Rufisque was a teacher-training institute for women from French West Africa in Rufisque, Senegal. It existed from 1938 to 1958.

== History ==
The École normale de Rufisque for girls was founded thirty-five years after its equivalent for boys, the École normale William Ponty. Run by the colonial administration, the teacher-training college offered the highest level of education girls could get in the areas of West Africa colonised by France. The first director of the school was from 1938 to 1945 was a Frenchwoman Germaine Le Goff, who had been commissioned by the Senegalese government to create its first normal school for teachers.

The pupils were girls and young women aged between thirteen and twenty, who were from a variety of West African countries. In the first few years of the school's foundation, a large number of pupils attended from the southern colonies such as Dahomey and a few directly from Senegal. The training scheme lasted for four years. The girls were only allowed to speak French to each other and wore school uniforms they had made themselves. A boarding school was attached to the school and pupils were separated from their families during the school year, from November to July. Graduation ceremonies were shared with the boys school. During the Second World War, the school struggled without financial resources.

A total of around 800 students graduated from the École normale de Rufisque during its existence from 1938 to 1958. One of the first teachers to graduate from the school was Ndèye Coumba Mbengue Diakhaté.

== Curriculum ==
The curriculum of the school was a colonial product, based on nineteenth-century French educational practice. Its established aims were to train women who wanted to be elementary school teachers, as well as preparing women to be the wives of successful men.

== Legacy ==
The school building that has been preserved and has housed the Lycée Abdoulaye Sadji since 1972.

== Notable alumni ==
- Mariama Bâ - Senegalese writer.
- Adja Rose Basse - Senegalese activist.
- Jeanne Martin Cissé - Guinean politician.
- Aïssata Coulibaly - Malian educator and activist.
- Ndèye Coumba Mbengue Diakhaté.
- Fatou Djibo - Nigerien women's rights activist and teacher.
- Annette Mbaye d'Erneville - Senegalese writer.
- Safi Faye - Senegalese film director and ethnologist.
- Jeanne Gervais - Ivorian politician.
- Aminata Tall - Senegalese politician.
