= Aminata Tall =

Senegalese politician

General Secretary of the Presidency of the Republic of Senegal
- In office October 2009 – April 2012

State Minister to the President of the Republic of Senegal
- In office March 2006 – February 2007
- President: Abdoulaye Wade
- Prime Minister: Idrissa Seck

State Minister, Minister of Local Autorhities and Devolution
- In office May 22, 2004 – March 2006
- President: Abdoulaye Wade
- Prime Minister: Macky Sall

State Minister to the President of the Republic of Senegal
- In office August 23, 2003 – 2004
- President: Abdoulaye Wade
- Prime Minister: Idrissa Seck

Personal details
- Born: 1949 (age 76–77) Diourbel, Senegal
- Party: Senegalese Democratic Party
- Education: Girls' Normal School of Thiès and Rufisque

Aminata Tall (born 1949 in Diourbel) is a politician of the Senegalese Democratic Party (PDS).

== Life and career ==
Tall attended the Girls' Normal Schools of Thiès and Rufisque, where she earned a D-series Baccalauréat. She earned a doctorate in Canada and taught at the École normale supérieure of Dakar.

She was a State Minister, the Minister of Local Authorities and Devolution, also a deputy to the National Assembly and mayor of Diourbel. However, in 2007, she refused her nomination as the deputy chairwoman of the National Assembly and did not join the government of Cheikh Hadjibou Soumaré.

In October 2009, she became the General Secretary of the Presidency of the Republic of Senegal, succeeding Abdoulaye Baldé who was appointed Minister of Armed Forces. She became the chairwoman of the Social and Environmental Economic Council on January 17, 2013.

== Bibliography ==
- Who's who of women in world politics. London/New York: Bowker-Saur. 1991. p. 236. ISBN 9780862916275.
- "Aminata Tall : La 'baronne' de Diourbel, in Femmes au Sénégal". Les Cahiers de l'Alternance (in French). No. 10. Dakar: partnership between the Konrad Adenauer Foundation and the Centre d'études des sciences et techniques de l'information (CESTI). December 2006. p. 88.
