= Mbengue =

Mbengue, Mbengué or M'bengue is a Senegalese surname. Notable people with the surname include:

== M'bengue ==
- Alioune Badara M'Bengue (1924–1992), Senegalese politician
- Babacar M'Bengue (born 1991), German footballer
- Cheikh M'Bengue (born 1988), French footballer
- Jessi M'Bengue (born 1989), French-born model and actress
- Moussa M'Bengue (born 1955), Senegalese basketball player
- Papa M'Bengue (born 1953), Senegalese judoka

== Mbengue and Mbengué ==
- Ablaye Mbengue (born 1992), Senegalese footballer
- Adama Mbengue (born 1993), Senegalese footballer
- Amadou Mbengue (born 2002), Senegalese footballer
- Aminata Mbengue Ndiaye, Senegalese politician
- Badara Mbengue (born 1966), Senegalese long jumper
- Mame Maty Mbengue (born 1968), Senegalese basketball player
- Ndèye Coumba Mbengue Diakhaté (1924–2001), Senegalese educator and poet
- Ngombe Mbengue (born 1993), Cameroonian footballer
- Sayna Mbengue (born 1998), Spanish handball player
- Seynabou Mbengue (born 1992), Senegalese footballer
- Youssoupha Mbengué (born 1991), Senegalese footballer
