= Jorgelina Martínez =

Uruguayan trade unionist (1927–2009)

- Born: 23 April 1927; Montevideo, Uruguay
- Died: 22 December 2009 (aged 82)
- Resting place: Cementerio del Norte de Montevideo
- Other name: La negra Jorgelina
- Citizenship: Uruguay
- Occupations: Trade unionist, politician, factory worker
- Organization(s): Centro Obrero de Alpargatas, Congreso Obrero Textil, Central de Trabajadores del Uruguay, Plenario Intersindical de Trabajadores – Convención Nacional de Trabajadores, Red de Mujeres Políticas

Jorgelina Martínez (23 April 1927 – 22 December 2009), also known as La negra Jorgelina, was a Uruguayan trade unionist, politician and factory worker who campaigned for women's rights. She co-founded the Central de Trabajadores del Uruguay and the Convención Nacional de Trabajadores, and took part in national political projects such as the Congreso del Pueblo and the Concertación Nacional Programática.

== Early life ==
Martínez was born on 23 April 1927 in Montevideo. Her mother was a housewife and her father a dockworker. She was the tenth child in the family. She lived in the Fraternidad neighbourhood until she was nine, when the family moved to Colón. After her father died, she had to leave school at 11 to work as a domestic servant. She later said that leaving school was the worst thing that ever happened to her.

In 1941, she began working at a meatpacking plant, and later at Anselmi, a biscuit factory. On her first day there, she went to a meeting about setting up a trade union, and she was fired the next day. The family later moved to Las Acacias and then to Brazo Oriental. In 1942, aged 15, she met the communist activist Julia Arévalo at a political meeting held in a private home, and was impressed by her speeches.

She then moved in with her brother in Buenos Aires, where she worked in a powdered milk factory and later as a domestic servant for a Nazi family. On 17 October 1945, she joined the Loyalty Day demonstration in the Plaza de Mayo. She returned to Uruguay that December.

In 1947, she started working for Alpargatas S.A. in a shoe factory, a job she kept for 27 years.

== Trade union leader (1952–1965) ==
When she started at Alpargatas, the workers had no union. In 1952, a group of workers who had come from rural areas proposed a strike for higher pay. The workers occupied the factory for 24 hours and stayed on strike for seven days until their demands were met. Afterwards, they founded the Centro Obrero de Alpargatas, where Martínez began her career as an activist.

In 1955, she helped found the Congreso Obrero Textil (Textile Workers' Congress), and was the only woman among its 12 leaders. Most textile workers at the time were women, but very few women held management positions. The same was true of trade unions, but according to the labour news site Rel-UITA, Martínez won wide respect as a union leader. She later said that, for her, being a woman and being a worker could not be separated.

In 1956, she and Delia Maldonado attended the first World Conference of Women Workers in Budapest. The following year, she joined the Socialist Party of Uruguay, as did Maldonado, Ignacio Huguet and Juan Ángel Toledo y Clavijo.

She left the party in 1963 and co-founded the Central de Trabajadores del Uruguay and the Convención Nacional de Trabajadores (CNT). In 1965, she participated in the Congreso del Pueblo as a representative of the Congreso Obrero Textil, to speak about workers' hardships under the National Party ("Blanco") government. Like many other workers, Martínez and her colleagues opposed the policies of the International Monetary Fund, which required austerity in return for loans.

== Dictatorship and return to democracy (1965–2009) ==
In the 1970s, under the civic-military dictatorship of Uruguay, Martínez faced political repression. She continued to campaign for workers' rights until the regime ended in 1985, even after the CNT was banned.

In 1983, she was one of five people asked to help set up the Plenario Intersindical de Trabajadores (PIT), a new union federation formed while the CNT was still banned. Over the next two years, she represented the CNT in the Concertación Nacional Programática, which brought together political parties, unions, businesses and other groups to agree on the main problems facing Uruguay after the dictatorship and how to solve them. The talks were modelled on Spain's Moncloa Pacts. Martínez worked on women's issues.

Within the CNT, she pushed for women's committees, where women union members could press for their rights within the labour movement. She pointed out, for example, that married women and mothers were paid less than single women, because employers expected them to leave work.

Martínez later joined the Broad Front, where she headed its Political Conduct Committee. She was also a member of the Red de Mujeres Políticas (Network of Women Politicians), and came out of retirement to join the PIT-CNT's Gender and Equality Committee.

She died on 22 December 2009, aged 82, and was buried in the Cementerio del Norte de Montevideo.

== Legacy ==
In 2013, she was one of the women chosen for the Uruguayan stamp series "Mujeres notables".

In 2014, the Chamber of Representatives held a session in her memory, in which members described her as a leading voice of the labour movement and a symbol of democracy's victory over dictatorship.

== See also ==
- Eumelia Hernández

== Bibliography ==
- Sapriza, Graciela (1988). Memorias de rebeldía : 7 historias de vidas (in Spanish). Montevideo, Puntosur: GREMCU.
