= Gladys Anoma =

Ivorian politician

- Born: Bonful Gladys Rose Anoma; 1930
- Died: October 26, 2006 (aged 75–76); Paris, France
- Burial place: Williamsville Cemetery, Abidjan, Ivory Coast
- Education: Ph.D., Sorbonne, Paris
- Occupations: Scientist, teacher, politician
- Spouse: Ambassador J. Georges Anoma
- Children: 4
- Father: Joseph Anoma

Gladys Anoma (1930 – October 26, 2006) was a scientist, professor and politician from the Ivory Coast in West Africa.

== Life ==
Anoma was born the daughter of Joseph Anoma, and while she later became known as Gladys Anoma, she was given the name Bonful Gladys Rose Anoma at birth. She was a student in Senegal for four years and in France for two years. She earned her doctorate in tropical botany from the Sorbonne, in Paris, France, and she also visited Tunisia, Germany, England, Ethiopia, Morocco and Ghana before she reached 37 years of age.

According to her obituary, she was married to HE Ambassador J. Georges Anoma. She also had a sister named Mrs. Aké.

A newspaper report about a five-week trip she made to Kingston, New York in August 1968, with 11 other African women leaders, states that her husband was, at that time, Secretary General of the Ministry of Foreign Affairs and that the couple had four children. The purpose of the trip was to explore "distaff matters in America and Africa."

She died in Paris in 2006 and was buried in Abidjan, Ivory Coast. A remembrance ceremony was held at Saint Jacques Church Two Plateaux for Anoma in 2016, 10 years after her death.

== Accomplishments ==
- Dr. Anoma taught at the University of Abidjan, Ivory Coast.
- She was co-author of an article on Ivorian flora that appeared in 1971.
- Politically, along with Jeanne Gervais and Hortense Aka-Anghui, she was one of three women elected to the Ivorian National Assembly immediately after independence; she served as the body's vice-president from 1975 until 1989.
- She was secretary-general of the Association des Femmes Ivoriennes (Association for Ivorian Women) for many years.

== Publication ==
- Kammacher, Paul, Adjanohoun, Edouard, Assi, L Ake, Anoma, Gladys. LA FLORE AGROSTOLOGIQUE DE COTE D'IVOIRE. Mitteilungen der Botanischen Staatssammlung München. 10, 1971, p 30-37. H. Merxmüller. München.
