= Association des Femmes Ivoiriennes =

Ivory Coast women's association

The Association des Femmes Ivoiriennes (AFI) or Association of Ivorian Women is a women's organization in the Ivory Coast, the women's wing of the Democratic Party of Ivory Coast (PDCI).

== History ==
The AFI was created in 1963 by Ivory Coast's First Lady, Marie-Thérèse Houphouët-Boigny, to replace the Feminine Committee, a previously active women's wing of the PDCI. Houphouët-Boigny was honorary president. Jeanne Gervais was the first vice president, and later the longrunning AFI president. Gladys Anoma was secretary general. In 1976 the AFI successfully pressed for Gervais to be appointed government minister for women. After maintaining a parallel existence with the party for several years, the AFI was formally affiliated with the PDCI in 1977.

The AFI has been criticized for subordinating the women's movement to PDCI party politics, restricting its activities to those regarded as appropriate for women while leaving 'real' politics to male party leaders. It has supported orphanages, held conferences on marriage and divorce, and sent representatives to international conferences. Others defend its role in promoting women's legal and economic rights.

One of the association's presidents was Martine Djibo.

== See also ==
- Gladys Anoma
- Martine Djibo
- Jeanne Gervais
