= Abassia Fodil =

Algerian trade unionist and feminist

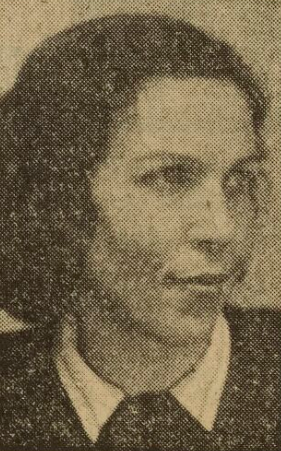
- Fodil in 1951
- Born: Abassia Dali-Ahmed; 1 March 1918; Sidi Bel Abbès, French Algeria
- Died: 2 February 1962 (aged 43); Oran, French Algeria
- Cause of death: Assassination
- Occupation: Trade unionist
- Known for: Women's rights activism
- Political party: Communist
- Children: 2

Abassia Fodil (1 March 1918 – 2 February 1962) was an Algerian regional secretary in Oran for the Algerian Communist Party and a prominent leader in the Algerian feminist movement. From 1943, until the organization was banned in 1954, Fodil was a leader in the Union des femmes d'Algérie (Union of Women of Algeria). The organization primarily worked to alleviate socio-economic issues in the post-war period and supported anti-war efforts and Algerian independence. She served on the executive committee of the Women's International Democratic Federation and was part of the delegation of WIDF members who investigated war crimes in North Korea in 1951. She and her husband were assassinated in 1962.

== Early life and education ==
Abassia Dali-Ahmed was born on 1 March 1918 in Sidi Bel Abbès, French Algeria. She married Mustapha Fodil, a leader in the Algerian Communist Party, with whom she had two children.

== Career ==
Fodil was the regional secretary in Oran for the Central Committee of the Algerian Communist Party and responsible for women's issues, including education, health, and social welfare concerns. Oran was one of the few districts with a majority of Muslim members in the communist party. Besides Fodil, militant Muslim women who were involved in the party in Oran included Leïla Mekki and Kheira and Yamina Nouar. In general, communists did not raise the issue of women's rights to avoid losing support from nationalists who opposed breaking women out of their traditional roles. Fodil recognized that appearances were important to her work for the party and was pragmatic about whether her audience would expect her to wear the traditional haik or a European dress.

In 1943, the Union des femmes d'Algérie (Union of Women of Algeria) was formed as the women's auxiliary of the Algerian Communist Party. The goals of the organization prior to 1946 were to build networks with other women and join in the fight to liberate and reconstruct France and to actively work against fascism. Primarily its members were European women, but Fodil was among the Muslim women leaders of the organization. The organization affiliated with the Women's International Democratic Federation (WIDF), and its initial activities focused on fighting against the high cost of living and towards equal pay. At the time, poor harvests and manufacturing shortages caused high food prices. Combined with low wages and discriminatory food rationing practices, the situation was dire and members of the organization took part in demonstrations aimed at promoting radical change. Activists also campaigned for Muslim women to gain voting rights, as the 1944 legislation extended that right only non-Muslim women and Muslim men. As the group aligned increasingly with anti-colonial goals after 1946, many of the non-communist European members left and more Muslim women joined. Fodil was responsible for organizing the activities of and recruiting members for the Union des femmes d'Algérie in Oran. She planned demonstrations against the First Indochina War and organized strikes by dock workers and agricultural laborers in Tlemcen Province.

Fodil was selected as one of the WIDF members sent to investigate conditions in North Korea in 1951 during the Korean War. The delegation visited the capital of Pyongyang, and other places, such as Huichon, Kanggye, Nampo, Sinuiju, and Wonsan which had been devastated by the war. The women gathered data meticulously outlining claims by the Korean government that war crimes, such as destruction of food supplies and housing, use of banned weapons, and torture against civilians, were being committed by United Nations Forces and bombing raids of the United States Air Force. The delegation wrote a report, We Accuse!, which was translated into Chinese, Korean, English, German, and Spanish. The United States Department of State and the United States Women's Bureau were concerned about the accusations in the report, had led to further investigation by the International Association of Democratic Lawyers. Apprehensive about the public perceptions of its wartime activities, the US government engaged in red-baiting the authors and covert actions by the CIA to discredit the WIDF and its investigators.

In 1953, Fodil attended the third WIDF Congress in Copenhagen and was reunited with eight of the women who had gone to North Korea. She was elected as a member of the executive council of the WIDF. At the congress, the women shared their observances in Korea and Fodil informed them that her husband was in prison and she was taking in sewing to support their children. At the time, members of the communist party were being arrested, stripped of their official positions, and disarmed because the French colonial authorities feared Soviet expansion and the Front de Libération Nationale (National Liberation Front, FLN) did not approve of plural-party rule. The following year, the National Union of Algerian Women was banned by the government and in 1955 the Algerian Communist Party was dissolved by the government.

== Death and legacy ==
Fodil and her husband were assassinated on 2 February 1962, by the Organisation armée secrète at Hassan Lazreg's Clinique Front de Mer in Oran. Assia Djebar, a novelist and one of the first Algerian women to write about terrorism in Oran in both the 1962 attacks during the quest for Algerian independence from France and during the 1992 Algerian Civil War, described their deaths in her work Oran, langue morte (Oran, Dead Language). Mustapha was in hospital when gunmen shot him. He died immediately. Fodil was in her room when they broke in and shot her. She was taken to a nearby hospital where she died a few hours later.

== See also ==
- List of assassinations in Africa
