= Ndèye Coumba Mbengue Diakhaté =

Senegalese educator and poet (1924–2001)

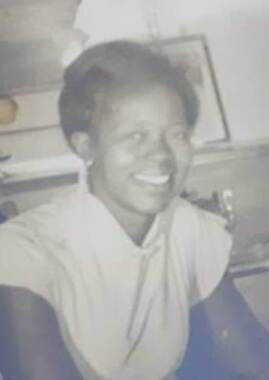
- Ndèye Coumba Mbengue Diakhaté, 1940
- Born: 9 December 1924; Rufisque
- Died: 25 September 2001 (aged 76); Dakar
- Writing career
- Genres: poet and educator

Ndèye Coumba Mbengue Diakhaté (9 December 1924 – 25 September 2001) was a Senegalese educator and poet who was active in promoting the education of mothers and their children. Her poetry is published in Filles du soleil (Daughters of the Sun, 1980).

== Biography ==
Born in 1924 in Rufisque, Senegal, Mbengue Diakhaté was one of the first schoolteachers to graduate from the Rufisque Normal School. She was an active member of Rufisque's Association pour l'Action sociale des femmes (Women's Social Action Association).

== Works ==
Her poetry conveys her views on how women are placed in society, for example, when a man tells his sister or mother "Jiguen rek nga!" (After all, you're just a woman). The conflict with the white population comes through in "Ils étaient Blancs, j'étais Noire..." (They were white, I was black). She not only conveys her innermost thoughts through her poetry but reproduces the forms and rhythms of the Serer oral tradition in her French verses.

== Death and legacy ==
Ndèye Coumba Mbengue Diakhaté died on 25 September 2001 in Dakar.
