= Adja Rose Basse =

- Born: c. 1920
- Died: October 31, 2005 (aged 84–85); Dakar, Senegal
- Education: École normale de Rufisque
- Occupation: Trade unionist

Adja Rose Basse (c. 1920 – October 31, 2005) was a Senegalese trade unionist and independence activist. She is considered the founder of the Senegalese Working Women's Movement

== Early life and education ==
Adja Rose Basse was born around 1920. Orphaned at a young age, she was sent to be educated at the École normale de Rufisque by her maternal grandmother. After marrying, she began working as a secretary.

== Activism ==
Rose Basse is considered one of the first women to become politically active in pre-independence Senegal.

She was introduced to politics by Amadou Lamine-Guèye of the French Section of the Workers' International (SFIO) in 1946. She joined that party, as well as the Senegalese Democratic Bloc. When the Union progressiste sénégalaise party was founded in 1958, she was the only woman named to its provisional executive committee, serving as secretary of propaganda.

She became vice president of the Union des femmes du Sénégal (UFS), a nonpartisan women's association. She represented the UFS at the Rassemblement Démocratique Africain congress in Cotonou, Benin, in July 1958. There, she called for complete Senegalese independence without continued attachment to Europe. She and fellow UFS members demonstrated in front of Charles de Gaulle during his 1958 visit to Dakar. She participated in a major gathering of African women activists in Nigeria in 1960.

As a trade unionist, she is considered the founder of the Senegalese Working Women's Movement. After independence, she was also active during the founding years of the National Confederation of Senegalese Workers. As a rare woman to serve as a union president in Senegal at the time, she saw the successful conclusion of 20 years of negotiations over municipal workers' rights.

She was closely allied with Mamadou Dia, Senegal's first prime minister. In 1963, after the political crisis between Dia and President Léopold Sédar Senghor, she was briefly imprisoned.

Having stepped back from activism for a few years, she later took an interest in the organization of Muslim associations. She also mentored young women who were interested in politics.

== Death and legacy ==
Rose Basse died in Dakar in 2005. A previous design of the 5,000-franc bill featured her image.
