= Ceremonial Drum of the Senufo People =

Ceremonial drum

The ceremonial drum of the Senufo people, who live along the Ivory Coast in Africa, is important to their culture. The drum represents various aspects of tradition and life for certain Senufo communities. The construction of the drum is particularly indicative of the roles of women within Senufo communities and how they are seen as "preservers of life" those that hold up the structure and spirituality which govern their world. In fact, of the four Senufo societies, which educate and govern the individual acts of people, the divination governing sandogo society is composed mostly of women. Senufo culture is matrilineal and certain societal positions such as the artisans, are determined by matrilineal inheritance. While ruled by elder male leaders, one's place in society, as well as their position for the future, is determined by the lineage of the mother. The ceremonial drum owned and housed in the Art Institute of Chicago epitomizes Senufo culture, and it is through drum's embellished designs that viewers are exposed to core beliefs of the Senufo, particularly, in how women are seen as guardians of divinity and supporting foundations of society for the Senufo.

== Provenance ==
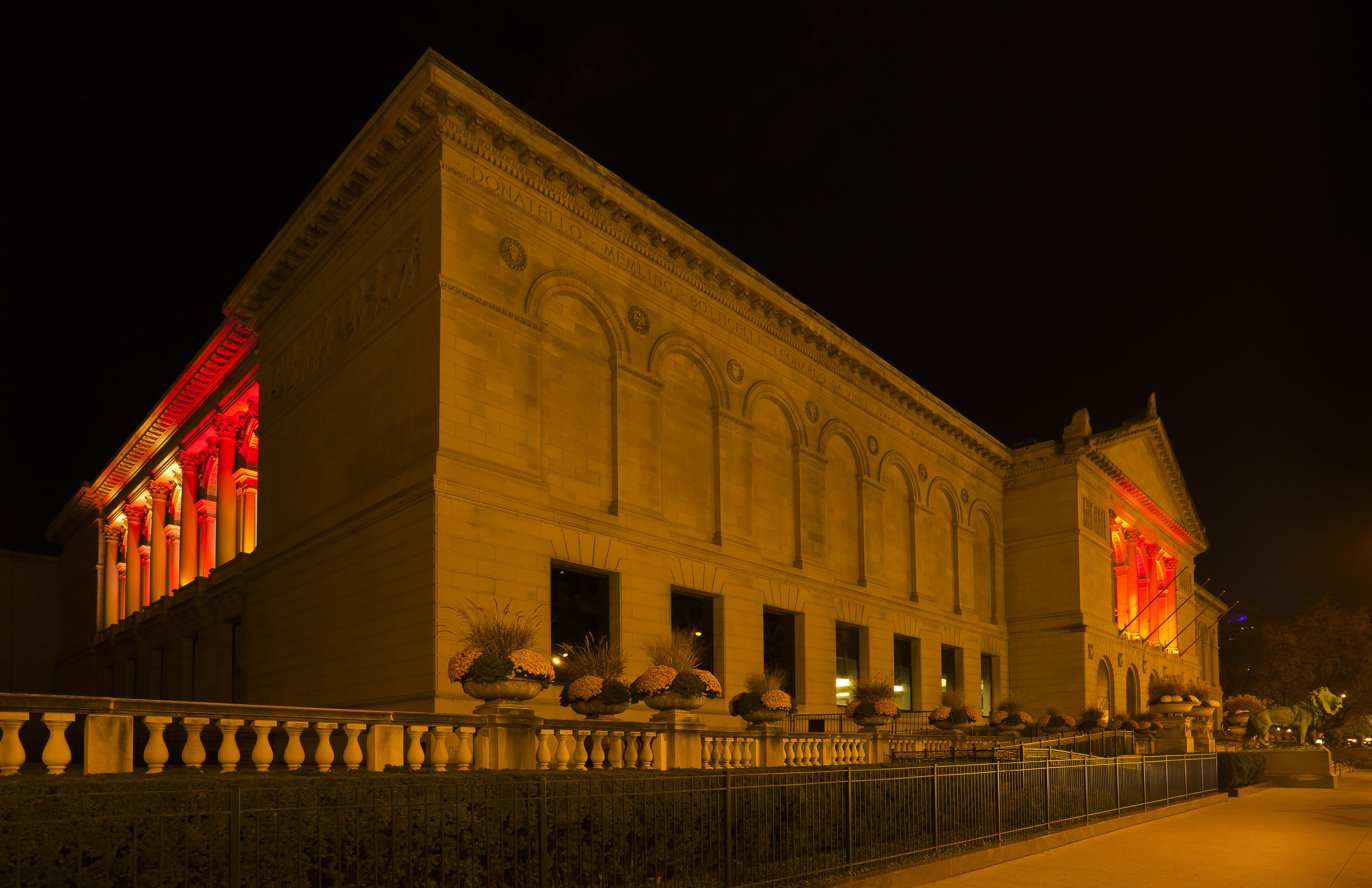
The Art Institute of Chicago are the current owners of the Senufo Ceremonial Drum.

The drum is thought to have been made within a Senufo community, in the Ivory Coast, sometime between the years of 1930 and 1950. The style is similar to that of the Kulebele artisans, known in particular for traveling to the commissioning patron in order to complete their work in person. The drums iconography and bas-relief motifs indicate the drum as having been most likely manufactured in eastern Kulebele settlements of the Mbengue region, where similar caryatid designs have been located by researchers. The aesthetic of the drum has been appreciated within collections and exhibitions, since its acquisition by Charles Ratton in 1957. Charles Ratton, a famous art dealer in his own right, recognized the importance aesthetic elements, which lay within the untapped realm of African art, and pushed for its display across the art world. The first record of exhibition of the object is at Cannes, France, Palais Miramar, Arts d'Afrique et d'Oceanie, from July 6 till September 29, 1957. In 1963, the ceremonial drum began a tour of the American museums, which were just opening up to appreciating African art as more than just an exotic fascination; New York, Museum of Primitive Art, Senufo Sculpture from West Africa (Feb 20 – Mar 5, 1963); traveled to Art Institute of Chicago (July 12 – Aug 11, 1963), Baltimore Museum of Art, (Sep 17 – Oct 27, 1963) cat. no. 117 (not ill.) In 1965 the object was sold to |Harry A. Franklin, relocating to Beverly Hills, California from the museum shelves. However, it was not long before it was again displayed publicly in Berkeley, Calif., Lowie Museum, African Arts, 1967. It made its final appearance under the ownership of Harry A. Franklin, at the Smithsonian Institution exhibit, "Sounding Forms: African Musical Instruments", from Apr 26 – June 18, 1989 It was then sold at Sotheby's, New York to the Art Institute of Chicago where it has been displayed for various exhibits such as; "Senufo Woman and Art: A Caryatid Drum" (Apr 27 – Oct 27, 1991), and "For Hearth and Altar: African Ceramics" (Dec 3, 2005 – Feb 20, 2006). Currently, the object is on exhibition being shown in Cleveland and St. Louis for the exhibit, "Senufo: Dynamics of Art and Identity in West Africa", but it will return after March 6^{th.}

== Construction ==
=== Drum Construction ===
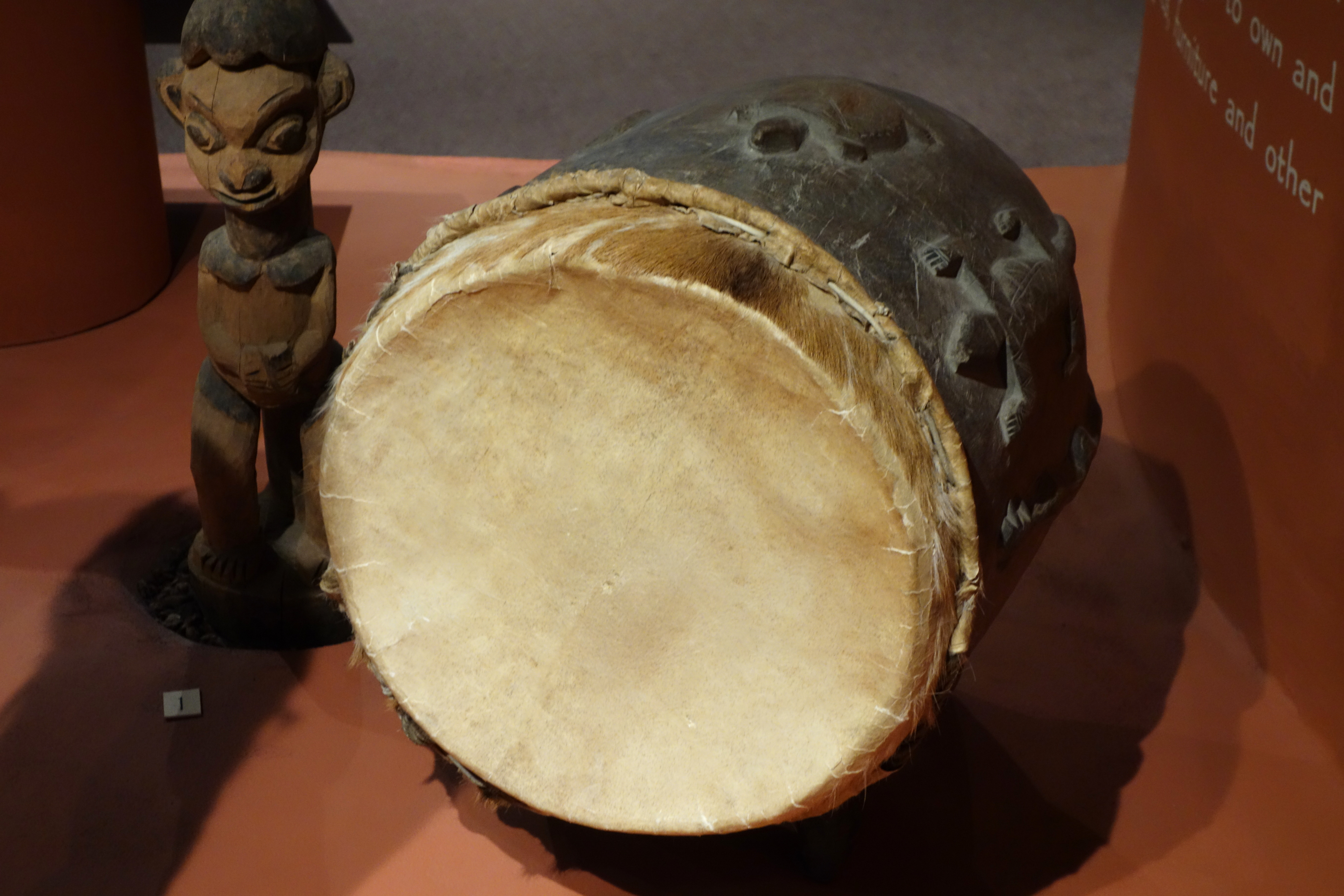
Example of a Senufo Punge Drum

The construction of the drum is unique; in the manner of its construction, the use of symbols, and even the colors used to decorate it. The drum itself has two main stylistic regional influences, the first being Western Sudanic, and the second being from the Guinea Coast. The drum is carved from a single piece of wood, made into a large vase shape and carved in bas-relief. The drum is supported by seated female who appears similar to Greek caryatid figures that would take the place of columns supporting entablatures upon their heads. As for the design of the caryatid figure, one can observe scarification marks on her face and abdomen; along with bracelets and carefully styled hair indicating high community status. The woman figure is further depicted as seated on four-legged stool reflecting a position of honor within the community, while the calm expression denotes the acknowledgement of the responsibility that she has within the community. This observation is derived from the fact that women are seen as the "preservers of life" within Senufo communities. They are seen as those that hold up the structure and spirituality, which govern their world. The drum contains on its surface many images which each denote their own individual meaning. There are snakes associated with divination; a male warrior with raised arms; a water snake attacking a tortoise which represents knowledge of medicine and sorcery, and how important winning is in hoeing contests; a male figure seated on a horse, holding a lance; a bird considered noble by the Senufo and a lizard/ crocodile carved in low-relief, considered to be one of the first creatures to inhabit the earth. These scenes and bas-relief designs demonstrate the universe of visual motifs that exist as part of Senufo visual and symbolic language. The theme of these motifs is regarding the role of knowledge and power within a world with competing spiritual and temporal forces.

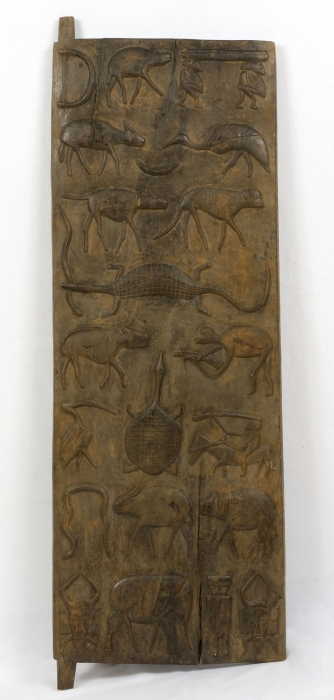
Example of bas-relief carving on a door by the Kulebele

The drum itself is classified as a Membranophone meaning that the sound is produced by creating a vibration in the membrane, or drum head. The membrane or drumhead is made from an unknown hide, affixed by seven wooden pegs, to a wooden drum indicative of the Kulebele wood carvers; a Senufo group known for traveling to work on location for their patrons. The drum is a rare find, and until 1993 there was only one other recorded and observed case of a drum with such a closely related style, and similar female caryatid figure. As of now, there are at least two other drums which share a likeness to the one located at the Art Institute; the first being located in the National Museum in Abidjan, Ivory Coast; the second, located, whose existence is only evident by a 1981 photograph taken in a Kasembele village neighboring the Mbengue Kulebele sculptors.

=== Makers of the Drum: The Kulebele carvers ===
The Kulebele Carvers form part of one of the oldest trade commercial networks of the Côte d'Ivoire with recorded migration the area as early as the eighteenth century. The Kulebele are well known throughout West Africa for their unique and detailed work on masks, statues, and artifacts for religious activities. The Kulebele carver who worked on this drum likely worked during the 1930s and 1940s, however it is possible that construction began as early as the 1920s. A distinctive characteristic of the Senufo Kulebele style is the use of bas-relief motifs utilizing animal iconography. The base-relief motifs and iconography evident found on the caryatid drum can be found in other Kulebele works, including the doors (to the right) made by western Kulebele workshops. However, Kulebele work does not only reside in Senufo culture. Since the 1940s the Kulebele have diversified their production, in order to sell their work to the changing tourist markets. This expansion has led away from the Senufo work, towards working Asante combs, Baule figures, and Dan masks.

== Uses ==
The drum in Senufo communities has many uses from ritual agricultural events, commemorating competitions, to being played to honor women of status at their funerals. The symbols and construction of the drum show the importance of divination within Senufo Society and of the role of women. The drum itself is a visual demonstration of how women and divination are intertwined tying to its construction as well as its use. While the majority of Membranophone drums are associated with males for agricultural competition based purposes and some ceremonial occasions, caryatid drums such as this one, are notable for their playing by women for funerary commencement within the Sandogo and the Poro Societies.

=== Agricultural Purpose ===
The members of a ton villa (a farming centered group consisting of young men and women) utilize music within agricultural competitions as a means of managing work productivity. The music itself creates a competitive atmosphere where each member attempts to outdo the other. In hoeing competitions for example:

"The competitors raise their hoes above their shoulders and bend low to cut deep into the soil. The quality of their work is as important as their speed. Women of the ton vala provide an important part of the music as they sing and play sichaala and sichaa-gun-go gourd rattles. Whether they join a djegele ensemble in the field, or sing as an independent group, they encourage the spirit of competition through songs of praise for each man's efforts. As the young farmers hoe their way through the fields, the musicians follow."

=== Ceremonial and divination purposes ===
Senufo culture is matrilineal, with certain positions such as the artisans being determined by matrilineal inheritance. Of the four Senufo societies, which educate and govern the individual acts of people, the divination governing Sandogo society is, notwithstanding those few men who inherit the position, mostly women. While ruled by elder male leaders, ones place in society, as well as their position for the future, is determined by the lineage of the mother For the Sandogo divination society, the drum would have been of great utilitarian importance. In particular, would have been used to summon spirits, played at ceremonial occasions such as funerals or memorials, and also at initiation ceremonies for young men in the tribe as they passed into adulthood.

The drum's design, of the load-bearing woman representing social and moral responsibility, has its roots in ceremony. In fact, the funerary associations of the drum can be seen to be drawn from one of the most important Senufo ceremonial events, a Kuumo or "great funeral". The ceremony draws hundreds of visitors who come to commemorate the lives of community elders who recently passed within a few years, as well as the spirits of the community's ancestral dead. The event is accentuated by performances of dances, masquerades, and instrumental groups. One of these instrumental group performances is particularly interesting for its live-action caryatid figure imitation by Poro society drum bearers. The demonstration itself is a Poro society ritual practice, whereby young, unmarried Senufo females actually bear the considerably heavy drums of the players, holding the instrument in the same pose as that of the caryatid figure.
