= Maria Mambo Café =

Angolan economist and politician (1945-2013)

Personal details
- Born: 6 February 1945 Cabinda Province, Angola
- Died: 1 December 2013 (aged 68) Lisbon, Portugal
- Party: MPLA
- Profession: Economist
- Nickname: Tchyina

Maria Mambo Café (6 February 1945 – 1 December 2013) was an Angolan economist and politician. She was a career member of the Movimento Popular de Libertação de Angola – Partido do Trabalho (MPLA).

== Biography ==
Café was born in 1945 in Cabinda Province, an exclave of Angola at the north of the country. She received a degree in economics in the Soviet Union in 1968. Café was part of the Angolan independence movement, first working from the present-day Kinshasa in the Democratic Republic of the Congo before returning to Angola in 1974. She was part of the Alvor Agreement negotiations which were signed on January 15, 1975 and led to Angolan independence. After independence, she was considered a loyal member of the MPLA who could bring people together.

Café's career began in 1977 when she was appointed Deputy Minister of Internal Trade, which lasted until 1978. In 1982, Café was appointed Minister of Social Affairs, becoming the first woman in Angola to be appointed to a cabinet position. In 1986, she left that Ministry to become Vice Premier and Minister of State for the Economic and Social Sphere, ending in 1988. She was from 1986 to 1987 considered one of the "super ministers". After a cabinet reshuffle, Café became a secretary for youth affairs. She nearly lost her position on the Central Committee of the MPLA. In 1992, she was elected to the People's Assembly.

According to media reports, she was, until her death, one of the 100 richest Angolans with assets oworthmore than 100 million dollars. Among other things, she had chaired the meeting of shareholders of the Bank of Commerce and Industry. She was one of several members of the Central Committee of the MPLA that received 10 million dollars from the Banco Espírito Santo Angola to develop the projects they wanted, without having to provide any guarantees to the bank.

Café died on 1 December 2013 in Lisbon, Portugal at the age of 68. She was buried at the Alto das Cruzes cemetery in Luanda on 6 December. The political bureau of Angola honored her in a statement that read, "Comrade Mambo Café 'Tchyina' holds an impeccable and enviable political trajectory in the struggle for freedom and democracy in Angola and the World." The Maria Mambo Café Airport in northern Cabinda province was named in her honor.

== See also ==
- List of the first women holders of political offices in Africa
