= Jeanne Martin Cissé =

Politician from Guinea (1926–2017)

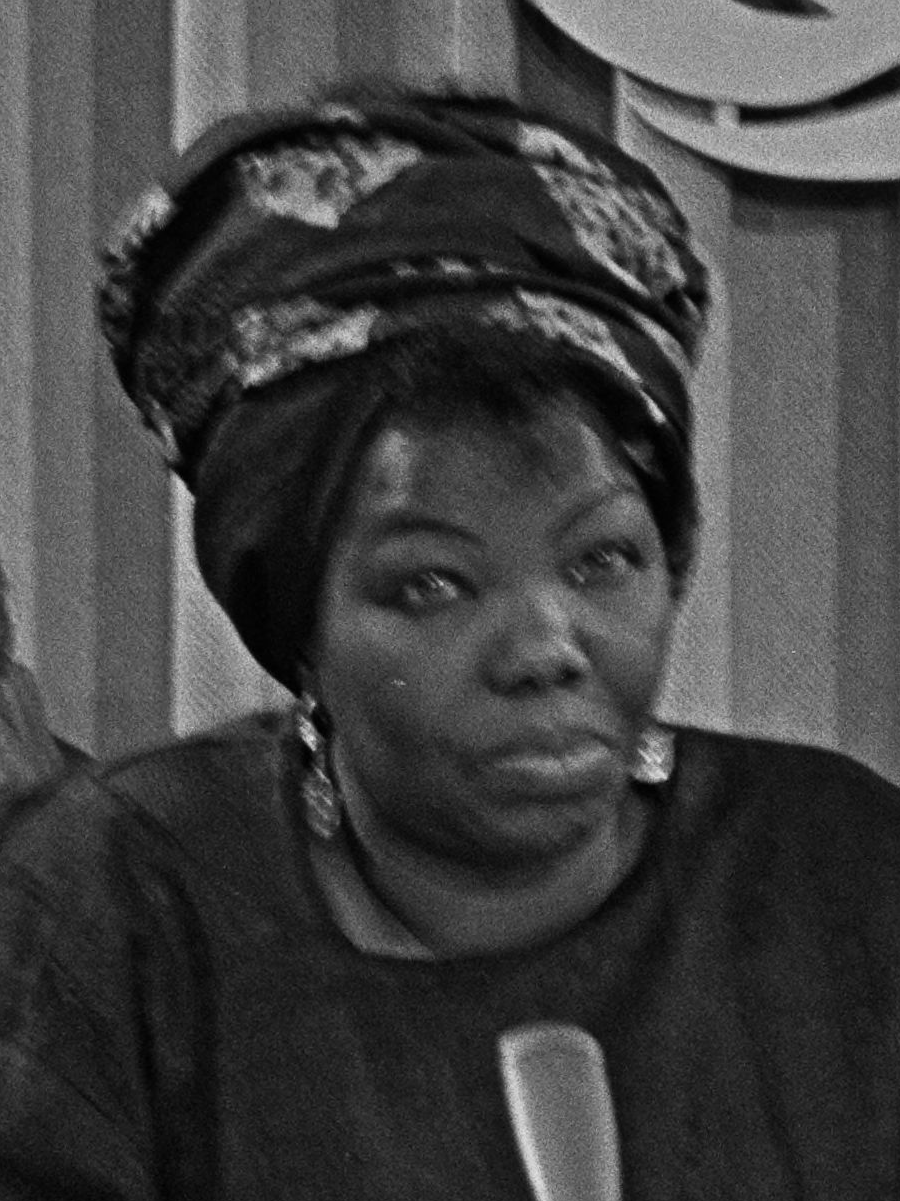
Martin Cissé in 1975

Jeanne Martin Cissé (6 April 1926 – 21 February 2017) was a Guinean teacher and nationalist politician who served as ambassador to the United Nations and in 1972 was the first woman to serve as President of the United Nations Security Council. She served in the government of Guinea as Minister of Social Affairs from 1976 until the 1984 military coup.

== Early life and education ==
Martin Cissé was born in Kankan, Guinea, on 6 April 1926, the eldest of seven children. Her father (Darricau Martin Cissé), P.T.T. employee for French colonial administration, was Malinke with Soninke origins (from her paternal grandmother) and her mother (Damaye Soumah), midwife, Soussou. She attended the École Normale de Rufisque in Dakar, Senegal, where she trained to become a teacher.

== Career ==
Martin Cissé was one of Guinea's first female teachers and was assigned to the girls' school in Kankan in 1944. She became a member of the Union Madingue in 1946. She met future President Ahmed Sékou Touré, then a PTT trade unionist, and joined the Rassemblement Démocratique Africain in December 1947. She lived in Senegal with her husband in the 1950s and represented the Senegalese Democratic Union at the Congress of the International Federation of Women in France in October 1954. After Guinea's 1958 referendum, she returned to Guinea where her husband became chief of staff to the Minister of Health in the new Republic of Guinea.. In 1956 she participated in the first World Conference of Women Workers in Hungary.

In 1959, Martin Cissé was a delegate to the congress of the West African Women's Union in Bamako, which sought to maintain a pan-African women's movement. She was Secretary General of the Pan African Women's Organization from 1962 until 1972. She was elected to parliament in 1968 and joined the Central Committee after her husband's death in 1971. She was the first woman Vice-President of the National Assembly of Guinea. She was Secretary General of the African Women's Conference until 1974 and was a delegate to the United Nations Commission on the Status of Women in Geneva and to the United Nations Commission on Human Rights.

In 1972, Martin Cissé was appointed as Guinea's Permanent Representative to the United Nations. Guinea was a non-permanent member of the UN Security Council and she became the first woman to chair the council. She was also elected to chair the United Nations Special Committee against Apartheid.

Martin Cissé returned to Guinea in 1976 at the request of President Touré, who appointed her as Minister of Social Affairs and a member of the Democratic Party of Guinea Politburo. After Touré's death in 1984, she was arrested along with numbers of other political leaders and detained for 13 months before being released without charge. After the failed coup attempt of Diarra Traoré in July 1985, she left Guinea, moving first to Senegal and then to the United States. In 1988, she joined the International Committee of Solidarity for Women and Children in Southern Africa. In 2004, she joined as a member of the International Association of Francophone Women. In 2006, U.S. President George W. Bush sent a message of congratulations on Martin Cissé's 80th birthday, acknowledging "her courage and her work".

Martin Cissé's biography, Daughter of the Milo, was published in 2008. In 2014, South African President Jacob Zuma awarded Martin Cissé the Oliver Tambo Order to acknowledge her role as a leader and model in the struggle for women's rights in Africa. She has, however, been criticized for trivialising the crimes of Touré, under whose regime up to 50,000 people were killed.

== Awards and honors ==
- Kuumba award for "significant contributions to African people", 1974
- Lenin Peace Prize, 1975
- Order of the Companions of O. R. Tambo, 2014, for her "excellent contribution in denouncing apartheid on the world stage of the United Nations and her stand against injustices that were happening in South Africa during apartheid."

== Personal life and death ==
In 1946, Martin Cissé married Mohamed Camara, a police inspector whom she did not know. He died in a car accident later that year when she was three months pregnant. In 1948, she married Ansoumane Touré, one of the founders of the Guinea Democratic Party. He died in Camp Boiro prison in 1971 after being arrested in the aftermath of Operation Mar Verde. Martin Cissé had six children. She lived in Baltimore, Maryland, United States.

Martin Cissé died on 21 February 2017.

== Publications ==
- "Woman, the first teacher". Prospects – Quarterly Review of Education. 5 (3). 1975.
- International Solidarity with the Struggle for Liberation in South Africa. 1976.
- "Family Problems in Africa". Guild Prac. 37: 23. 1980.
- La fille du Milo (in French). Présence Africaine. 2010. ISBN 9782708708020.
