= Jeanne Gervais =

Ivorian politician (1922 – 2012)

Jeanne Gervais, née Jeanne Ahou Siefer-N’Dri (June 6, 1922 – December 9, 2012) was an Ivorian politician and the first woman minister in Côte d'Ivoire.

Born in Grand-Bassam, Gervais was the daughter of a French father and a Baoulé mother. She became married to Marc Gervais, also born to a French father. Marc had a similar background in terms of education, and worked as an entrepreneur in the construction sector. Jeanne and Marc Gervais had seven children: André, Marie Dominique, Liliane, Nicole, Claudine, Georges, and Chantal.

A longtime member of the Democratic Party of Côte d'Ivoire – African Democratic Rally, she participated in the women's march in her hometown in 1949. Trained as a teacher at the École normal de Rufisque, she became one of three women, alongside Hortense Aka-Anghui and Gladys Anoma, elected to the National Assembly immediately after independence. She served in that body from 1965 until 1980. In 1976, she was named head of the Ministry of Women's Affairs, remaining in that role until 1984 and becoming the first woman to serve in the Ivorian cabinet. She was also active for many years as president of the Association des Femmes Ivoiriennes.

== Views on feminism ==
Although she led initiatives to improve women’s legal status, literacy, and employment, Gervais rejected the “feminist” label and framed her agenda in terms of gender complementarity and national development. In 1976–77 interviews she said the ministry “would not be feminist” and that women were not seeking advancement “at the expense of men,” advocating equal civic rights while maintaining wives’ and mothers’ domestic roles. Commentators, such as historian Elizabeth Jacob later described her approach as a pragmatic “feminism without excess”; Gervais herself criticized what she viewed as the “excesses” of European and North American feminisms and called instead for a balance between men and women.
