= National Union of Algerian Women =

Organization based in Algeria

- Types: Non governmental
- Country: Algeria
- Region: North Africa
- Directors: Jean Garoby

The National Union of Algerian Women (French: Union Nationale des Femmes Algériennes - UNFA) is a women's organization in Algeria, founded in 1943, as the Union des femmes d'Algérie (Union of Women of Algeria).

The women's movement in Algeria originated in the liberation movement from French colonialism in the 1940s, when women were mobilized in the struggle and integrated in the political system. The two pioneer women's groups were the National Union of Algerian Women (UNFA), which was affiliated with the Algerian Communist Party (PCA), and the Association of Algerian Muslim Women (AFMA), founded in 1947 to mobilize women in support of political prisoners and their families. The two women's groups both offered a more public role for women, which made it possible for them to leave traditional seclusion and participate in public life, but the contrasted from each other. The UFA included many women in all levels of the Algerian Communist Party, who advocated equality between men and women, both educational professional and political, while the AFMA mobilised women as well as men in the struggle from French colonialism, but expected women to step back from public life once independence from France had been won.

The initial chair was Mme. Jean Garoby, who oversaw operations in Algiers. Abassia Fodil organized the activities and recruited members in Oran. It was an affiliate of the Women's International Democratic Federation. The organization was banned in 1954, and throughout the duration of the war, no women's groups were allowed to operate. In 1963, the organization held a congress from 20 to 21 January to re-establish itself as the Union nationale des femmes algériennes (National Union of Algerian Women).
