= Emília Dias =

Angolan politician (born 1972)

- Born: 1972 (age 53–54)
- Citizenship: Angola
- Occupation: Politician

Emília Carlota Sebastião Celestino Dias (born 1972) is an Angolan politician and educator. She has been a member of Angola's National Assembly since 2008. In 2026, she was elected secretary general of the Organization of Angolan Women.

== Biography ==
Emília Carlota Dias was born in Angola's Namibe Province in 1972.

She started her political career in the 1980s as a member of various youth organizations, including the Agostinho Neto Pioneer Organization and the Youth of MPLA. She holds a bachelor's degree in education, specializing in history, and she previously taught at the School of Professional Training in Arts and Crafts in Namibe Province. She also was appointed as a section chief of the Angolan National Institute of Children.

In 2008, Dias was elected to the National Assembly of Angola as a member of the ruling MPLA party, representing the national electoral constituency. She was reelected in 2012, 2017, and 2022. In 2010, she served on the Constitutional Assembly that rewrote the Angolan Constitution, becoming one of the document's signatories.

In 2026, she was elected secretary general of the Organization of Angolan Women, succeeding Joana Tomás. She has served on the organization's Central Committee since 2005.

Throughout her career, Dias has advocated for women's empowerment, including support for rural women and the inclusion of women in decision-making processes.
