= Joana Tomás =

Journalist in Angola

- Born: 1969 (age 56–57); Calandula, Angola
- Citizenship: Angola
- Education: Methodist University of São Paulo
- Occupation: Journalist

Joana Domingos dos Santos Filipe Tomás Martins (born 1969) is an Angolan journalist who served as secretary general of the Organization of Angolan Women from 2021 to 2026.

== Early life and education ==
Joana Tomás was born in 1969 in Calandula, Malanje province. She became involved in activism at a young age in the 1980s, joining the Agostinho Neto Pioneer Organization. Pursuing further education, she moved with her family to Brazil, where she continued to engage in youth activism. There, she studied communications at the Methodist University of São Paulo, graduating in 1993.

== Career ==
In 1995, Tomás returned to Angola and began working as a journalist at the public broadcaster Televisão Pública de Angola in 1995. She rose to lead the TV broadcaster's coverage in Cuando Cubango province and eventually direct TPA International.

For her work, she won the Prémios Maboque (2004) and National Journalism Prize (2008).

Tomás also continued to engage politically, joining the MPLA party, working on various communications and campaign projects. In 2019, she was elected to the Political Bureau of the MPLA Central Committee.

She also, on her return to Angola, joined the Organization of Angolan Women (OMA), an MPLA-affiliated national political group that fights gender discrimination. In 2005, Tomás was elected to the OMA's National Committee. Then, in March 2021, she was elected to a five-year term as secretary general of the OMA. She succeeded the organization's longtime leader Luzia Inglês Van-Dúnem. In 2026, she completed her term and was succeeded by Emília Carlota Dias.
