= Camy Squadron =

Kamy Squadron
- Esquadrão Kamy
- Active: 1966–1967
- Country: Angola
- Allegiance: People's Movement for the Liberation of Angola
- Branch: People's Army for the Liberation of Angola
- Type: Column
- Role: Guerrilla warfare
- Size: 150
- Engagements: Angolan War of Independence

Commanders
- Current commander: Benigno Ingo Vieira Lopes

The Camy Squadron was a guerrilla column formed by fighters from the People's Armed Forces of Liberation of Angola (EPLA), the armed wing of the Popular Movement for the Liberation of Angola (MPLA), in the struggle for Angola's independence.

The squad was especially known for containing five female guerrilla founders of the Organization of Angolan Women - Deolinda Rodrigues, Engrácia dos Santos, Irene Cohen, Lucrécia Paim, and Tereza Afonso - who were captured by the National Liberation Front of Angola (FNLA), supported by the Revolutionary Government of Angola in Exile (GRAE), on 2 March 1967, and subsequently murdered.

== History ==
The Camy Squadron was made up of 150 guerrillas, including five women (records from 1966 include a sixth woman, Josefa de Assunção Gualdino, aged 17, who is not present in later records — because she fell ill and was unable to accompany the squadron). It was named after Moisés Cardoso "Kamy", a member of the guerrillas on the Cabinda front, who died in a landmine accident on 8 October 1965, at the age of 23. The squadron was trained between October and November 1966 at Camp Calunga by Cuban nationalists, under the instruction of the head of the training contingent, Colonel Augusto Martínez Sanchez. The unit received 45 days of training that included technical instruction in the use of Soviet, Chinese and Belgian weapons, as well as tactical, physical and political training.

In December, Benigno Ingo Vieira Lopes, a veteran from Cabinda, was appointed commander of the squadron. His mission was to cross Brazzaville to Luanda to take reinforcements from the Congo-Brazzaville border to the first political-military region (which included the provinces of Luanda, Zaire, Uige and Cuanza Norte) and the Cienfuegos squadron (named after the Cuban revolutionary Camilo Cienfuegos), in order to reinforce the Northern Front and liberate Luanda. The women, outnumbered in the squadron, were subjected to gender discrimination by the other combatants, a result of colonialism.

Their mission was hampered by precarious conditions shortly after arriving in Angola via Zaire Province on 12 January 1967. Because of rain, the unit got lost making its way through the jungle, with Portuguese bombers flying over the area. There were internal conflicts among the guerrillas; disease, insects, ferocious animals, hunger and other problems caused discouragement and death among some of the squadron. The scarcity of food led them to resort to hunting and foraging in the local vegetation. When they reached the Mbridege River on 10 February, the unit was down to 119 members and the difficulties, exacerbated by the siege by Portuguese troops, prevented part of the battalion, weak and ill, from continuing. The squadron split up, and 70 guerrillas attempted the crossing while others decided to return to Congo-Brazavile; this second group, of 49 people, included the five female guerrillas.

The first group, led by Ingo, was subjected to multiple ambushes by the FNLA and the Portuguese army, and arrived in Nambuangongo on 1 April 1967, reduced to 21 members.

The returning group, led by logistics chief Ludy Kissassunda, lost several combatants. When they reached the border with Congo-Quinxassa, 20 survivors remained. On 2 March 1967, the five women were captured in Camuna along with the other fighters and taken to Cacocol prison in Congo-Quinxassa by the FNLA, with the support of the GRAE. They were later transferred to the FNLA base in Quincuzo, and were never seen again. Some of the captured men managed to escape, but the women were shot on an unconfirmed date, despite national and international appeals for their lives.

== The five heroines of Angola ==
The five women who formed part of the squadron and left with it for Luanda, known as "the five heroines of Angola", were:

=== Engrácia dos Santos ===
Engrácia Gaspar dos Santos (1947 — Quincuzo Base, Congo-Quinxassa, March 1967), also known by her nom de guerre Lukotcheka, was the daughter of peasants and moved to Luanda at the age of seven with an aunt. In 1964, after the death of her uncle in the Dembos area, they took refuge in Zaire, where they came into contact with the MPLA. Santos traveled to Brazzaville and was part of the first group of women to complete the Revolutionary Instruction Course (CIR) in Dolisie in 1965, later joining the Camy Squadron.

=== Irene Cohen ===
Irene Cohen de Brito Teixeira (Lobito, 19 April 1939 — Quincuzo Base, Congo-Quinxassa, March 1967), also known by her nom de guerre Luzolo, was the eldest of three siblings. Her father worked in a commercial company and her mother was a housewife.In 1950, Cohen moved with her family to Luanda, where she completed fifth grade at Liceu Salvador Correia. In 1958, she began working in the colonial administration's economic services as a secretary, and from 1960 onwards she attended the Association of Angolan Nationals (ANANGOLA), a group of Angolan intellectuals who promoted cultural events in the country. From 1963 she was a member of the Santa Cecília Group, which met on the premises of the African National League (LNA). This group, which was religious in nature, also distributed food, gave sewing classes, hygiene information and literacy and political training courses for women. The group was eventually integrated into the MPLA and began to function as a cell of the movement - for this reason, Cohen was interrogated several times by the International and State Defense Police (PIDE).. In 1964, Cohen joined the MPLA and traveled to Portugal, where she obtained a false passport to travel to Paris. In 1966, she represented Angolan youth at the VIII Congress of the Communist Youth of Romania, held in Bucharest. On her return to Brazzaville, she worked as secretary to the MPLA Steering Committee and its president, Agostinho Neto, and also as an active militant in the OMA.

=== Tereza Afonso ===
Tereza Afonso Gomes (Nambuangongo, 1946 — Quincuzo Base, Congo-Quinxassa, March 1967) was the daughter of peasants and only completed elementary school. From an early age, she supported the guerrillas fighting in the MPLA's first political-military region. In 1964, she traveled to Zaire and joined the MPLA in Quinxassa. She then went to Brazavile, where she continued her involvement in the movement. In 1965, she completed the course at the Center for Revolutionary Instruction (CIR) in Dolisie and joined the Camy Squadron.

== Controversy ==
Although official sources record the deaths of the five combatants as having taken place on 2 March 1967, in 2007, MPLA MP Ruth Neto publicly stated that this was the date of their capture, and that they died in 1968. According to Roberto Francisco de Almeida, Deolinda Rodrigues' brother, the five captured women were transported to the FNLA military base in Quincuzo, where they were held captive until shortly before the visit of the Organization of African Unity (OAU) Good Offices Commission, which had been sent to Congo to assess the conflict and establish the contribution of each movement. It was then that they were executed, allegedly in 1968 or 1969.

== In popular culture ==
=== Angolan Women's Day ===
2 March, the day the five women were captured, was designated Angolan Women's Day.

=== Public space ===
In 1986, a monument, Largo das Heroínas, was inaugurated to commemorate the efforts of Angola's female guerrilla fighters between 1961 and 1975, including the five women of the Camy Squadron.

=== Fine arts ===
In 2022, at the Casa de Angola Cultural Center in São Paulo, Brazil, the exhibition Rainhas do N'gola (Queens of the N'gola) by Angolan artist Isidro Sanene featured images of the Camy Squadron's guerrilla women.

=== Theater ===
The play Esquadrão Kamy, directed by Flávio Ferrão and based on the lives of the five women in the unit, premiered in 2019 at the Casa das Artes in Talatona and was part of the 25th edition of the Mindelo International Festival in Cape Verde. The guerrilla women were played by Sofia Felicidade Alberto Buco, Naed Branco, Lia Carina de Sousa Monteiro, Zoé Silva and Ailsa Renata Gota Conceição de Sousa. The play is based on the books Diário de um Exílio sem Regresso, by Deolinda Rodrigues and Heroínas de Angola, by Cuban writer Limbânia Jimenez.

=== Literature ===
Heroines of Angola by Limbânia Jiménez Rodriguez "Nancy" (who was part of the group that trained the Camy squad), was published for the first time in 1985.
