= Lucrécia Paim =

- Born: 1939
- Died: 1967 (aged 27–28)
- Citizenship: Portuguese Angola
- Occupations: solder, guerilla

Lucrécia Paim (Caxito, October 16, 1939 - Quincuzo, Congo Quinxassa, March 1967) was an Angolan feminist, human rights defender and nationalist activist, considered a martyr of the country's decolonization process. She was a member of the Popular Movement for the Liberation of Angola (MPLA) and co-founder of its women's wing, the Organization of Angolan Women (OMA). She was captured, tortured and executed by the National Front for the Liberation of Angola (FNLA) in the context of the fratricidal struggle between the MPLA and the UPA/FNLA.

She was a member of the Camy Squadron of the People's Armed Forces of Liberation of Angola (EPLA)..

She is honored by the Lucrécia Paim Maternity School, the largest hospital unit specializing in obstetrics in Angola, which also serves as the teaching hospital for the Faculty of Medicine of the Agostinho Neto University.
