= Zico (footballer) =

Brazilian footballer and manager (born 1953)

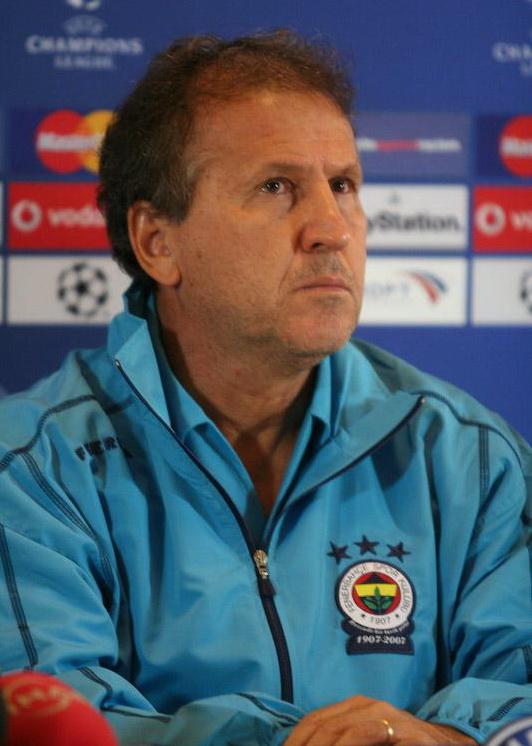
- Zico managing Fenerbahçe in 2007

Personal information
- Full name: Arthur Antunes Coimbra
- Date of birth: 3 March 1953 (age 73)
- Place of birth: Rio de Janeiro, Brazil
- Height: 1.72 m (5 ft 8 in)
- Position: Attacking midfielder

Team information
- Current team: Kashima Antlers (technical adviser)

Youth career
- 1967–1971: Flamengo

Senior career*
Years	Team	Apps	(Gls)
1971–1983	Flamengo	485	(354)
1983–1985	Udinese	39	(22)
1985–1989	Flamengo	66	(20)
1991–1994	Kashima Antlers	45	(35)
Total		635	(431)

International career
1976–1986	Brazil	71	(48)

Managerial career
- 1999: Kashima Antlers
- 2000–2002: CFZ
- 2002–2006: Japan
- 2006–2008: Fenerbahçe
- 2008–2009: Bunyodkor
- 2009: CSKA Moscow
- 2009–2010: Olympiacos
- 2011–2012: Iraq
- 2013–2014: Al-Gharafa
- 2014–2016: Goa
- 2018–2022: Kashima Antlers (technical director)
- 2022–: Kashima Antlers (technical adviser)
Medal record
Representing Brazil
Men's Football
FIFA World Cup
Third place	1978 Argentina
Copa América
Third place	1979 South America
Men's Beach Soccer
Beach Soccer World Championship
Winner		1995 Brazil
Winner		1996 Brazil
Men's Football
Representing Japan (as coach)
Asian Cup
Winner		2004 China
- * Club domestic league appearances and goals

Arthur Antunes Coimbra (Portuguese pronunciation: [aʁˈtuʁ ɐ̃ˈtũnis koˈĩbɾɐ], born 3 March 1953), better known as Zico ([ˈziku]), is a Brazilian football coach and former player who played as an attacking midfielder. A creative playmaker with excellent technical skills, vision and an eye for goal, he is widely regarded as one of the greatest players of all time, and also considered one of the best free kick specialists in history. According to one estimate, Zico has scored the most direct free kicks in history, with 101 goals including friendlies, among which 62 are verified in official games.

Renowned for his technical brilliance, Zico was once described by Pelé as "the one player that came closest to me throughout the years". During his playing career, Zico was elected as the 1981 and 1983 Player of the Year. In 1999, Zico came seventh in the FIFA Player of the Century grand jury vote, and in 2004 was named in the FIFA 100 list of the world's greatest living players.

With 48 goals in 71 official appearances for Brazil, Zico is the fifth highest goalscorer for his national team. He represented Brazil in the 1978, 1982 and 1986 World Cups. Although Brazil did not win any of those tournaments, the 1982 side is regarded as one of the greatest teams in the history of the World Cup. He is widely considered the greatest Brazilian never to win the World Cup.

Beyond his playing and coaching career, Zico served as Brazil's Secretary of Sports from 1990 to 1991, contributing to reforms that culminated in the 1993 legislation known as the Lei Zico.

Zico has coached the Japan national team at the 2006 FIFA World Cup, previously winning the 2004 Asian Cup with the squad. He has also coached Fenerbahçe, who reached the quarter-finals of the UEFA Champions League in the 2007–08 season under his command. He has also coached CSKA Moscow, Olympiacos and the Iraq national team. Since 2022, Zico has served as technical adviser at Kashima Antlers.

== Early years ==
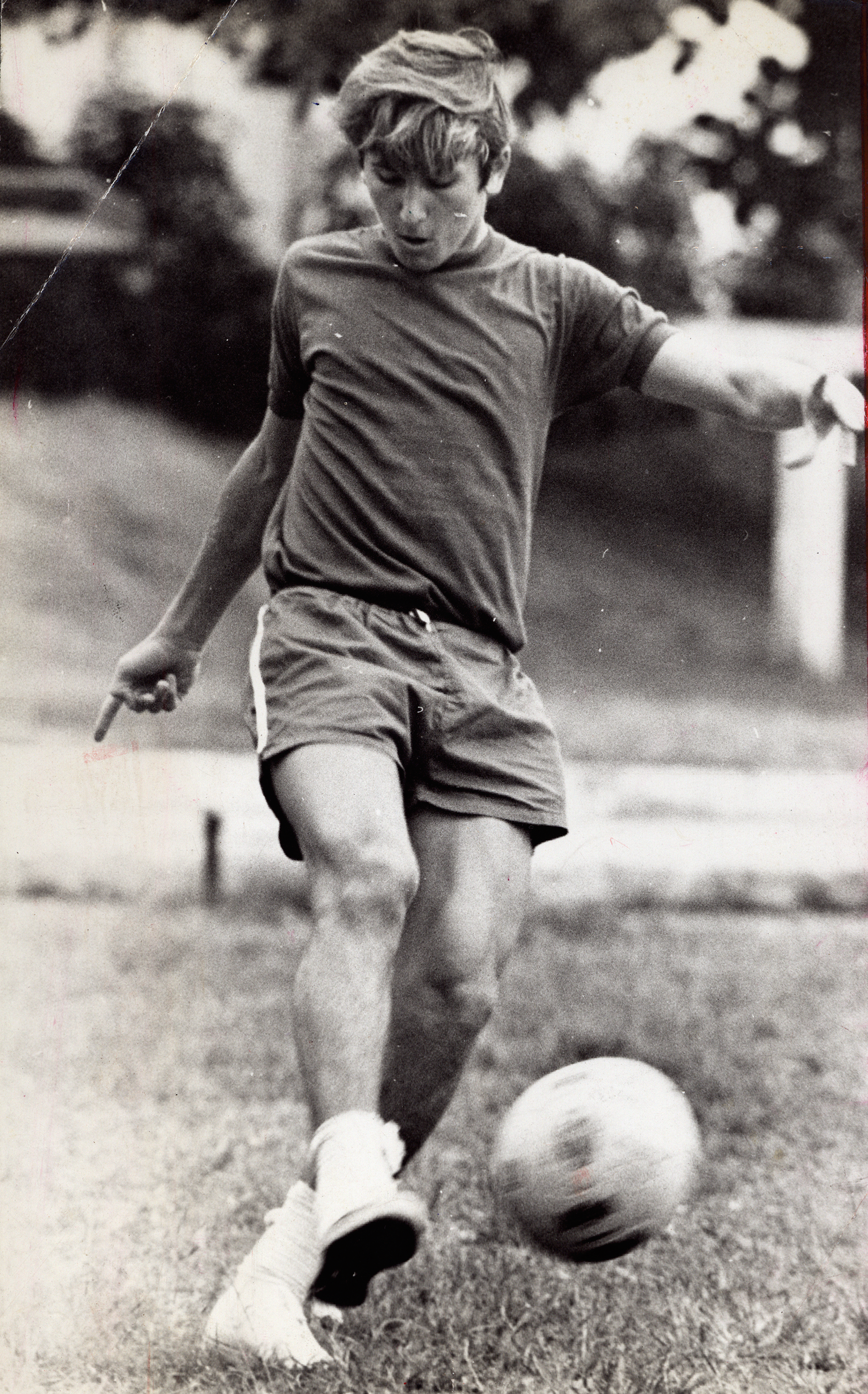
A teenage Zico in 1971

Born in 1953, Zico grew up in a family of Portuguese descent in the working-class neighbourhood of Quintino Bocaiuva, Rio de Janeiro. From an early age, he was renowned for his footballing ability, regularly impressing local spectators while playing against older children and teenagers. As a child, Zico played for Juventude, a local futsal street team run by his older brothers and friends, and had also begun playing for futsal club River Futebol Clube on Sundays.

His nickname originated from increasingly shortened versions of the endearment Arthurzinho ("Little Arthur") which then became Arthurzico, then Tuzico and, finally, Zico, a version created by his cousin Ermelinda "Linda" Rolim.

In 1967, at 14 years old, he had a scheduled trial at América, where his brothers Antunes and Edu were professional players. But on a Sunday, during a River match, Zico scored nine goals and caught the attention of radio reporter Celso Garcia, who asked Zico's father, José Antunes Coimbra to take him to a trial at Flamengo instead. A fervent Flamengo supporter, José Antunes encouraged Zico to take the opportunity and arranged a trial with the club.

== Youth career ==
A physically slight teenager, Zico underwent an intensive muscle and body development program pioneered by physical education teacher José Roberto Francalacci. A combination of hard work and a special diet sponsored by Flamengo enabled Zico to develop the physique essential for his professional success.

Between 1971 and 1972, Zico moved between Flamengo's youth and professional squads. Coach Fleitas Solich had confidence in Zico's abilities and promoted him to the first team, but after Mario Zagallo took over, Zico was considered too young and returned to the youth side. Zico's situation improved when Joubert, his first youth coach, became Flamengo's manager and permanently promoted him after 116 matches and 81 goals in the youth team.

== Club career ==
=== Flamengo (1971–1983) ===
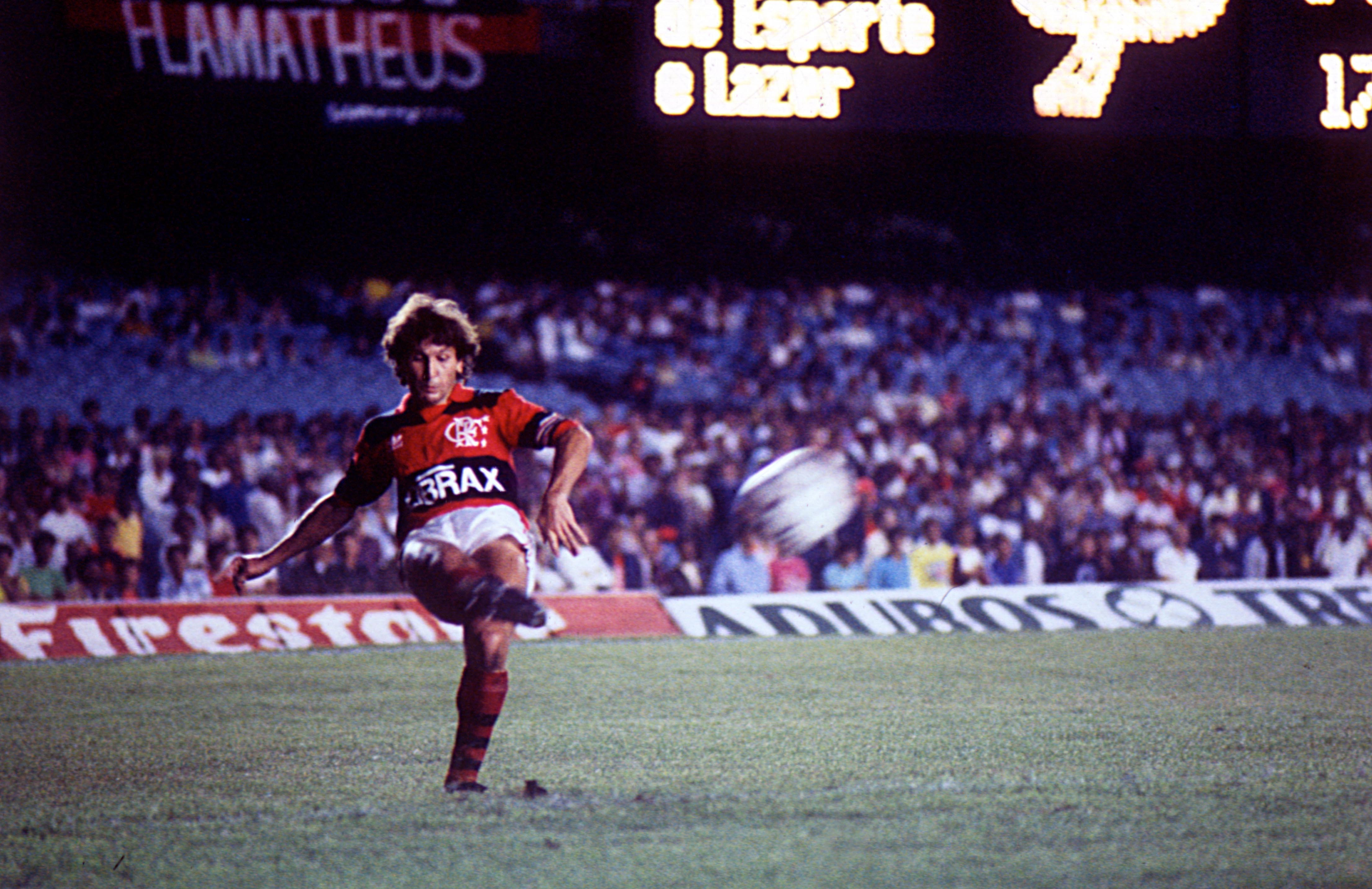
Zico while playing in Flamengo in 1981

Considered the greatest player in Flamengo's history, Zico propelled the club to immense popularity.

Zico made his senior debut for Flamengo in 1971, in a 2–1 victory over rivals Vasco da Gama. After initially alternating between the youth and senior teams, he established himself as a regular starter in 1974 and inherited the club's number 10 shirt. That year, he helped Flamengo win the Campeonato Carioca and received the Bola de Ouro award from Placar as the best player in the Brazilian championship.

During the second half of the 1970s, Zico became Flamengo's leading player and goalscorer. He helped the club win successive Campeonato Carioca titles in 1978 and 1979, including the additional championship held in 1979. That year, he surpassed his childhood idol Dida as Flamengo's all-time leading goalscorer.

In 1980, Flamengo won their first Campeonato Brasileiro Série A title, defeating Atlético Mineiro in the final. Having missed the first leg through injury, Zico returned for the decisive match at the Maracanã, scoring once and assisting Nunes in a 3–2 victory.

The following year, Flamengo made their first appearance in the Copa Libertadores. Under manager Paulo César Carpegiani, the team advanced to the final against Chilean club Cobreloa. Zico scored both goals in Flamengo's 2–1 victory in the first leg at the Maracanã. After Cobreloa won the return match 1–0, a deciding match was held at the Estadio Centenario in Montevideo on 23 November 1981. Zico again scored twice, including a late free kick, securing a 2–0 victory and Flamengo's first continental title. He finished the competition as its leading goalscorer, with 11 goals in 13 appearances.

Flamengo subsequently faced European champions Liverpool in the Intercontinental Cup in Tokyo on 13 December 1981. Zico played a central role in the team's 3–0 victory, providing the passes for both of Nunes's goals and taking the free kick that led to Adílio's goal. He was named the match's most valuable player. Flamengo also won the Campeonato Carioca that year.

In 1982, Flamengo retained the Brazilian championship, defeating Grêmio in a three-match final. Zico scored a late equaliser in the opening 1–1 draw at the Maracanã. After a goalless second match, Flamengo won the deciding match 1–0 in Porto Alegre, with Zico providing the pass for Nunes's winning goal. The club secured a third national title in 1983, defeating Santos in the final. After losing the first leg 2–1, Flamengo won the return match 3–0 at the Maracanã, with Zico opening the scoring in the first minute. He subsequently left Flamengo to join Italian club Udinese, ending his first spell with the club after twelve years.

=== Udinese (1983–1985) ===
Although Zico had turned down a 3-million dollar offer from A.C. Milan to stay at Flamengo in 1981, renewed European interest following the 1982 World Cup led Roma and A.C. Milan to once again pursue the Brazilian playmaker in 1983. Flamengo eventually accepted a 4-million dollar bid from Udinese for Zico. The Italian Football Federation (FIGC) initially withheld approval of the transfer pending financial guarantees, prompting demonstrations by Udinese supporters. Protesters adopted the slogan O Zico, o Austria! ("Either Zico or Austria"), invoking Friuli's historical ties to the Habsburg monarchy. The transfer was subsequently approved.

During the 1983–84 Serie A season, Zico formed an attacking partnership with Franco Causio and scored 19 league goals in 24 appearances, finishing one goal behind the league's leading scorer, Michel Platini, despite playing fewer matches. His season was disrupted by a muscular injury sustained during a friendly against Brescia in March 1984, which caused him to miss five league matches. Udinese finished ninth in the league. In 1983, Zico was named World Player of the Year by World Soccer magazine. He also received the 1983–84 Chevron Award for the highest goals-per-match ratio in Serie A.

Zico continued to struggle with injuries during the 1984–85 season, making only 15 league appearances and scoring three goals. Udinese's ambitions were also affected by changes in the club's management and the departure of several players. Zico criticised the club's failure to strengthen the squad as promised, stating that president Lamberto Mazza had dismissed the Sporting Director and allowed more than half the team to leave.

Zico also faced legal proceedings concerning the financial arrangements of his transfer to Udinese, but was ultimately acquitted on appeal.

On 27 March 1989, Zico returned to Udine for a farewell match with the Brazilian national team against a World XI at the Stadio Friuli, attended by approximately 40,000 spectators. Zico remains highly regarded by Udinese supporters.

=== Return to Flamengo (1985–1989) ===
In July 1985, Zico returned to Flamengo through a transfer financed by a consortium of companies. The arrangement was organised through the advertising agency Estrutural as part of a campaign known as Projeto Zico.

One month into his return, Zico suffered a debilitating knee injury after a violent tackle from Bangu defender Marcio Nunes. Although the injury required multiple surgeries and there were serious doubts about his recovery, Zico was considered indispensable to the Brazilian National Team and called up for the 1986 FIFA World Cup, where his form and mobility were visibly affected.

After more surgeries, in 1987, Zico led Flamengo to the Copa União title.

December 1989 marked Zico's last official appearance for Flamengo in a Brazilian National Championship match against rivals Fluminense. Zico scored the first goal and Flamengo won the match 5–0.

Two months later, at the Maracanã, he would play his last match ever as a Flamengo player, facing a World Cup Masters team composed of names like Eric Gerets, Claudio Gentile, Franco Causio, Alberto Tarantini, Jorge Valdano, Mario Kempes, Paul Breitner, Karl-Heinz Rummenigge and Paulo Roberto Falcão. With 731 matches for Flamengo, Zico is the player with the 2nd most appearances for the club. His 508 goals make him the club's top scorer ever.

His achievements in Flamengo's history inspired the Brazilian singer Jorge Ben Jor to write a song in his honour – Camisa 10 da Gávea – helping create the mystique of the club's number ten.

=== Initial retirement (1989-1991) ===
Following his departure from Flamengo in 1989, Zico retired from professional football. During this period, he represented Brazil in the World Cup of Masters, scoring in the finals of the 1990 and 1991 editions.

=== Kashima Antlers (1991–1994) ===
In 1991, Zico moved to Japan to help develop the country's emerging professional football system, joining the Sumitomo Metals, a second-division club based in Kashima, Ibaraki Prefecture, ahead of the J.League's inaugural season in 1993. He played for Sumitomo during the 1991–92 season, the final season of the Japan Soccer League, and finished as the second division's top scorer.

Following the establishment of the J.League, Sumitomo Metals became Kashima Antlers. In the club's opening match of the inaugural season, Zico scored a hat-trick in a 5–0 win over Nagoya Grampus. Despite being regarded as outsiders compared to better-funded clubs such as Yokohama Marinos and Verdy Kawasaki, Kashima won the first stage of the 1993 season, known as the J.League Suntory Series, and finished as runners-up overall. On 15 June 1994, Zico scored the final goal of his playing career in a 2–1 win over Júbilo Iwata.

Zico became an influential figure in the development of Japanese football and gained widespread recognition among Japanese football supporters, who nicknamed him サッカーの神様 (sakkā no kamisama), "God of Football". A statue in his honor stands outside Kashima Soccer Stadium.

== Beach soccer career (1995–1996) ==
Following his retirement from Kashima Antlers in 1994, Zico represented Brazil in beach soccer. Brazil won the inaugural Beach Soccer World Cup 1995, with Zico finishing as the tournament's joint top scorer with 12 goals alongside Alessandro Altobelli, and sharing the best player award with longtime teammate Leo Júnior. Brazil won a second title in 1996, with Zico scoring in the 3–0 victory over Uruguay in the final.

== International career ==
Across his senior international career, Zico scored 48 goals in 71 official appearances for Brazil, making him one of the country's leading international goalscorers.

Zico represented Brazil in the 1971 CONMEBOL Pre-Olympic Tournament, helping the team qualify for the 1972 Summer Olympics. Despite scoring against Argentina during qualification, he was omitted from the Olympic squad. Disappointed by his exclusion, he briefly considered retiring from football before being persuaded to continue by his family.

Zico made his senior international debut in 1976, winning the Bicentennial Cup Tournament and the Taça do Atlântico. At the 1978 FIFA World Cup in Argentina, Zico appeared in six matches and scored once, converting a penalty in Brazil's 3–0 victory over Peru. During Brazil's opening match against Sweden, he headed the ball into the net from a corner kick, controversially disallowed by referee Clive Thomas after ruling that he had blown the final whistle before the ball entered the net. Brazil finished the tournament unbeaten, securing third place with a 2–1 victory over Italy.

At the 1979 Copa América, Zico scored twice in the group stage, helping Brazil advance to the semi-finals. He was sent off during a 2–2 draw against Argentina and subsequently missed the semi-final matches against Paraguay through suspension. Brazil finished third in the tournament.

From 1979, Zico formed an attacking partnership with Sócrates in the national team, initially under manager Cláudio Coutinho. The two players shared a preference for quick passing, improvisation and positional interchange, and their complementary styles became an important feature of Brazil's attacking play. Their on-field partnership was accompanied by a close personal friendship, which both discussed in contemporary interviews with Placar magazine.

At the 1982 FIFA World Cup in Spain, Zico was the focal point of Brazil's celebrated team under manager Telê Santana, playing alongside Sócrates, Paulo Roberto Falcão, Toninho Cerezo, Júnior and Éder. Sócrates, who captained the side, regarded Zico as its outstanding player, describing him as the team's "king" and himself as its "prince".

The side became closely associated with Futebol Arte, an expressive, attacking style of football that attracted widespread international admiration. Brazil won their opening four matches, with Zico scoring four goals and providing four assists, the highest combined total of any player at the tournament. He scored against Scotland, New Zealand and Argentina, and assisted Sócrates's equaliser in the decisive second-round match against Italy. Brazil lost 3–2 following a hat-trick by Paolo Rossi. The 1982 side is frequently regarded as one of the greatest teams never to win the World Cup.

Zico played in the 1986 FIFA World Cup while still injured and only appeared as a second-half substitute throughout the tournament. In the quarter-final match against France during regulation time, he helped win a penalty, but then missed his kick.The match ended 1–1, and Brazil were eliminated in the subsequent penalty shootout, despite Zico converting his attempt; Sócrates and Júlio César missed theirs.

== Style of play ==
A classic number 10, Zico usually played as an attacking midfielder, although he was also capable of playing in several other attacking and midfield positions, and was also deployed as a central midfielder, as a second striker or inside forward, or even as an outside forward; he is regarded as one of the greatest players of all time. A diminutive playmaker, with a small, slender physique, although he was naturally right-footed, he was essentially a two-footed player, who was known for his flair, speed, exceptional technique, ball control and dribbling skills, as well as his use of tricks and feints to beat opponents with the ball. Former Dutch international Ruud Gullit rated Zico as "one of the best dribblers in the history of the game", describing him as "very nimble". Although he was not physically imposing, Zico was a quick, complete and highly creative player, with excellent vision, who is considered to be one of the best passers of all time and was known for his trademark no-look passes. In addition to being an elite creator of goalscoring opportunities, Zico was also a prolific goalscorer himself and an excellent finisher, due to his powerful and accurate striking ability, which made him extremely clinical in front of goal; as such he is also regarded by pundits as one of the greatest goalscorers in the history of the game.

He was also a set-piece specialist, who was renowned for his ability to bend the ball and score from dead ball situations and is considered to be one of the greatest free-kick takers of all time. Zico's unique free kick technique, which saw him place significant importance on his standing foot, often saw him lean back and raise his knee at a very high angle when hitting the ball with his instep, thus enabling him to lift it high over the wall, before it dropped back down again; his method of striking the ball allowed him to score free kicks even from close range, within 20 to 16 metres from the goal, or even from just outside the penalty area. Moreover, due to his technique, mentality, unpredictability and accuracy in dead ball situations, he was capable of placing the ball in either top or bottom corner on either side of the goal, which made it difficult for goalkeepers to read his free kicks. His ability from set-pieces inspired several other specialists, such as Roberto Baggio and Andrea Pirlo.

In addition to his footballing skills, Zico was also known for his leadership, mental strength and determination, as well as his stamina, dedication and for having an outstanding work-ethic; indeed, he was often known for staying behind in training to practice and refine his free kicks. Throughout his career, Zico was nicknamed O Galinho ("The Little Rooster", in Portuguese).

Despite his ability, his career was plagued by injuries.

== Public life ==
=== Players' union activity ===
During his playing career, Zico was involved in efforts to organise professional footballers in Rio de Janeiro and Brazil. In 1975, Zico, along with Zé Mário, Paulo César Carpegiani, Dirceu and Émerson Leão, established the Associação Profissional dos Atletas de Futebol (APAF), a players' association that preceded the Sindicato dos Atletas de Futebol do Estado do Rio de Janeiro (SAFERJ). The union received its official charter from the Ministry of Labour in 1979.

Zico later succeeded Zé Mário as president of the Rio de Janeiro players' union. As president, he advocated improved working conditions for professional footballers, drawing attention to low pay among the majority of players and the large number of matches played by leading footballers. In a 1981 interview with El Gráfico, Zico contrasted the high earnings of a small number of prominent players with the low salaries received by thousands of other professionals, and argued for stronger organisation among players.

Zico was critical of the passe system, under which clubs retained substantial control over players' registration and transfers. In 1979, he described the system as treating footballers as "merchandise" whose futures could be decided by clubs. During his presidency, the Rio players' union challenged abuses associated with the passe, including through legal action before the Supreme Federal Court in 1981. Zico also advocated for the expansion of the players' unions throughout Brazil and the creation of a national confederation. In 1982, Zico and Sócrates were involved in efforts to strengthen cooperation between the Rio de Janeiro and São Paulo unions and support the establishment of players' unions in other states.

=== Secretary of Sports ===
In March 1990, President Fernando Collor de Mello appointed Zico Secretary of Sports of the Presidency of the Republic.

During his tenure, Zico established a commission to develop new legislation governing Brazilian sport. The commission included sports-law scholar Álvaro Melo Filho, whose proposed text had formed the basis of Article 217 of the 1988 Brazilian Constitution concerning sport. Zico's team studied sports legislation in Brazil and other countries and consulted sports clubs, federations and confederations before preparing its proposal.

The proposed legislation sought to reform the administration and financing of Brazilian sport and to increase the autonomy of sports organisations. In professional football, it proposed changes to the governance of clubs and federations and the abolition of the passe.

The proposal encountered opposition from sections of the Brazilian football establishment, including the CBF. Zico later said that increasing difficulties in advancing the reforms contributed to his decision to leave the government.

Zico resigned in April 1991, citing difficulties reconciling his government responsibilities with family life. He remained in office until the legislative proposal had been submitted to Congress, leaving on 24 April. After leaving office, Zico continued to advocate for the proposal, returning to Brasília in June 1991 to promote it.

The proposal underwent substantial changes during the legislative process. Federal deputy Arthur da Távola served as rapporteur for the legislation. In particular, the proposal to abolish the passe was not included in the legislation eventually enacted. The resulting Law No. 8,672, enacted in 1993, became popularly known as the Lei Zico ("Zico Law").

=== Football administration ===
Following his retirement as a player, Zico was appointed technical adviser to Kashima Antlers in 1995. He subsequently served as club director from 1996 to 2002.

In May 2010, Zico was appointed football director of Flamengo. He resigned in October of the same year, citing internal opposition and disputes with the club's leadership.

On 10 June 2015, following Sepp Blatter's announcement of his resignation amid the FIFA corruption scandal, Zico announced his intention to stand for the FIFA presidency. However, his campaign failed to secure the five required endorsements from national football associations.

In August 2018, Zico returned to Kashima Antlers as technical director. In 2022, he transitioned to an advisory role, supporting the club's football operations.

In May 2025, Zico was appointed club ambassador of Flamengo, representing the club in Brazil and internationally.

=== CFZ and social initiatives ===
In 1995, Zico opened the Centro de Futebol Zico (CFZ) in the Recreio dos Bandeirantes area of Rio de Janeiro, combining football training and player development with educational and social programmes for children and young people. According to Zico, one of his principal motivations for establishing the centre was the shortage of sporting facilities in Barra da Tijuca and Recreio, which left many local children without access to football pitches. He described its purpose as providing children with the opportunity and enjoyment of playing football while passing on lessons that he had received during his own development as a player. A second club, CFZ de Brasília, was established in 1999.

CFZ subsequently developed a wider network of football schools and social programmes. The methodology was later formalised through Escola de Futebol Zico 10, led by Zico's sons Bruno and Thiago Coimbra. Zico has described its purpose as combining the teaching of football with the development of young people as citizens, with the programme emphasising social and personal development alongside football instruction. The network expanded to more than 50 units across Brazil by 2012; by 2015, the programme operated in 21 Brazilian states.

A significant part of the programme has focused on providing access to football for children from low-income and socially disadvantaged backgrounds. The Golaço Social project, developed in partnership with public authorities and other organisations, established football schools for children and adolescents from low-income families and linked participation to school enrolment and attendance. In Piauí, a programme launched in 2009 provided places for 4,400 children across 44 municipalities.

Inclusion of children with disabilities has also formed part of the CFZ's approach. Thiago Coimbra, Zico's son and president of CFZ, has said that children with disabilities had participated in its activities since its early years and described socialisation and inclusion as principles of its methodology. Its programmes have included autistic children and children with other disabilities alongside other participants.

The CFZ has also been used as a centre for international youth exchange, particularly between Brazil and Japan. During the 1990s, Kashima Antlers arranged for youth players to spend periods training at CFZ in Rio de Janeiro. This relationship contributed to the establishment in 1998 of the Copa da Amizade Brasil-Japão, an under-15 tournament created to promote sporting and cultural integration between young players from the two countries.

CFZ's facilities have also been used by professional players. In early 2002, Ronaldo trained at the centre while recovering from injury ahead of the 2002 FIFA World Cup.

In November 2018, Zico announced a collaboration with former Italian international Paolo Rossi, seeking to establish a partnership between the Paolo Rossi Academy in Perugia and Zico's football schools in Brazil, with the aim of developing young players and expanding access to football training. Rossi, who had become a close friend of Zico, visited Rio de Janeiro to help launch the project.

== Coaching career ==
=== Japan ===
After the 2002 FIFA World Cup, Japan Football Association looked for a replacement for the outgoing Philippe Troussier, and chose Zico as his successor. Despite his lack of coaching experience besides his stint as Brazil's technical coordinator during the 1998 World Cup, Zico had great understanding of Japanese soccer from his playing days and his role as Kashima's technical director. In addition, JFA had grown tired of Troussier's clashes with the media while the players were frustrated with his micromanagement. In contrast, Zico commanded respect from reporters and urged players to express themselves on the pitch.

Although Zico attempted to instill a free-flowing, attacking mentality to the team, his regime got off to an uneven start, which included a 4–1 loss to Argentina in 2003. Japan had a respectable showing at that year's Confederations Cup but struggled again in the beginning of 2004, only narrowly beating Oman in the first stage of qualifying for the 2006 FIFA World Cup and several players were suspended after a drinking incident. Although Japan had not lost in its nine previous matches, he was rumored to be on the verge of resigning and a small group of fans marched in the streets of Tokyo demanding his firing.

He stayed on, however, and won the 2004 Asian Cup despite intimidation from Chinese fans and a team that featured just one European-based player, Shunsuke Nakamura. He then helped Japan qualify for the 2006 FIFA World Cup with just one loss.

Despite the rocky start, injuries to key players and even a bizarre offer from Garforth Town, Zico led Japan to its third World Cup finals appearance and the third Asian Cup title in four tries. His Japanese team was heavily influenced by Brazil's short passing style and he was flexible enough to switch between 4–4–2 and 3–5–2 formations. In addition, he has had a respectable record on European soil, beating Czech Republic and Greece and drawing with England, Brazil and Germany.

However, Japan failed to win a single match at the Finals, losing twice (to Australia and Brazil) and drawing once (to Croatia), and scoring just two goals while conceding seven. He resigned from Japan at the end of the World Cup campaign.

=== Fenerbahçe ===
In July 2006, signed a two-year deal with Fenerbahçe. He won the league title in 2006-07 and won Turkish Super Cup on the first year of his job. Under his command Fenerbahçe qualified to the 2007–08 UEFA Champions League knockout stage for the first time in club history, where they beat Sevilla on penalties to advance to the quarter-finals. Fenerbahce beat Chelsea 2–1 in the first leg, but Chelsea won 2–0 at Stamford Bridge to eliminate Fenerbahce. This was Fenerbahce's best performance in UEFA competitions.

Zico was given a new nickname by Fenerbahçe fans: Kral Arthur (meaning "King Arthur" in Turkish). For the team's nickname King Arthur and his Knights. On 10 June 2008, he resigned as Fenerbahçe manager after failing to agree on contract terms.

On 8 September 2008, Zico revealed that he would be interested taking over the vacant managers position at Newcastle United following the resignation of Kevin Keegan. He is quoted saying "The Newcastle job is one that I would be very interested in taking. It would be a privilege and an honour, I've always wanted to experience the Premier League as I believe I could enjoy much success coaching in England."

=== Bunyodkor, CSKA Moscow and Olympiakos ===
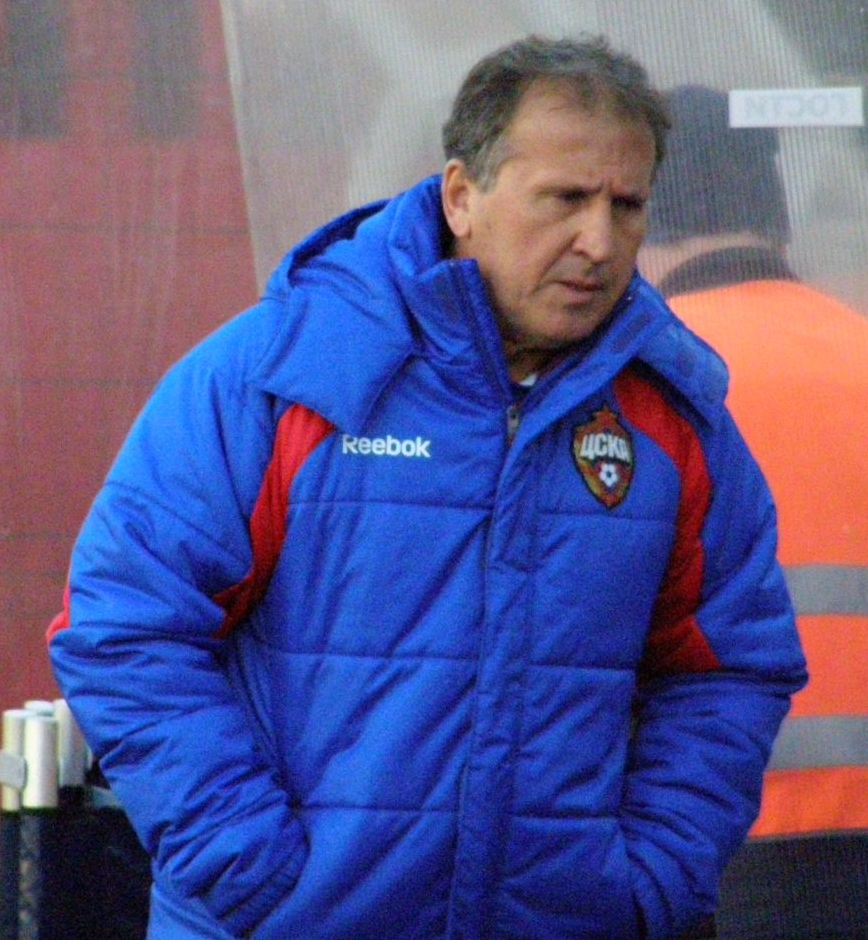
Zico in 2009 as manager of PFC CSKA Moscow

In 2008, he coached FC Bunyodkor in Uzbekistan, where he won the Uzbekistani Cup and the Uzbek League. He subsequently took over at Russian side CSKA Moscow but was fired on 10 September 2009.

Less than a week later Zico signed a 2-year contract with Olympiacos. Despite the absence of numerous first-team players due to injuries, he led the Greek club to a comfortable second place in Group H of the Champions League, earning the qualification to the knockout stage. In the Greek Superleague, his first results were also impressive, but the success lasted only till early winter, when the fans started to complain about both the results and the playing style of the team after a Greek cup elimination at the hands of second division side Panserraikos. On 19 January 2010, after a 0-0 draw against Kavala, Zico was sacked, although his team lost only two times (twelve wins and four draws) in the Greek Superleague.

=== Iraq ===
He signed a contract with the Iraq Football Federation on 28 August 2011 and first managed the national team in a match against Jordan on 2 September 2011. Zico resigned as coach of the Iraqi national team on 27 November 2012 after little more than a year in the post, saying the country's football association had failed to fulfill the terms of his contract. He had ten wins, six draws and five losses in 21 games with Iraq.

=== Al-Gharafa ===
On 6 August 2013, he signed a two-year deal to coach Al-Gharafa of Qatar.

=== Goa ===
Indian Super League side Goa signed Zico as their coach for the debut season in 2014. Though Goa had a slow start to the season, they ultimately qualified for the semifinals with a game in hand by defeating Chennaiyin. In 2015, Goa did really well to reach the final. Eventually, Goa lost 3–2 to Chennaiyin. Zico has been regarded as Goa's new legend among the local fan base. In January 2017, Goa confirmed ending their three-year association with Zico. Keeping the logistical challenges of the upcoming season in mind, the two parties amicably came to this decision.

== Personal life ==
Zico is the grandson of Fernando Antunes Coimbra, his paternal grandfather, and Arthur Ferreira da Costa Silva, his maternal grandfather, both of whom were Portuguese. His father, José Antunes Coimbra (1901–1986), was born in Tondela and emigrated to Brazil at the age of 10. Zico's mother, Matilde Ferreira da Silva Costa (1919–2002), died 16 years after her husband. Through his ancestry, Zico holds Portuguese citizenship in addition to Brazilian nationality.

Zico was the youngest of six children: Maria José (Zezé), Antunes, Nando, Edu and Antônio (Tonico). Three of his brothers—Antunes, Nando and Edu—were also professional footballers. While playing professionally for Flamengo, Zico obtained a degree in physical education from Universidade Castelo Branco in Rio de Janeiro.

Zico was a close friend of his Flamengo teammate Geraldo Assoviador, who introduced him to Brazilian singer-songwriter Fagner. Zico later described Geraldo's death at the age of 22 in 1976 as "the first great loss" of his life.

In 1969, Zico met his future wife, Sandra Carvalho de Sá. The couple became engaged in 1970 and married in 1975. They have three sons, Arthur Jr., Bruno and Thiago. Fagner is Thiago's godfather. Sandra's sister, Sueli, is married to Zico's brother Edu. Zico is Roman Catholic. He is also a distant relative of the Portuguese footballer Eduardo Quaresma.

Outside football, Zico recorded a two-song single with Fagner in 1982, featuring "Batuquê de Praia" and "Cantos do Rio". He later appeared as an actor in the 1998 children's comedy film Uma Aventura do Zico. Zico also performed as himself in the 2021 Brazilian telenovela Quanto Mais Vida, Melhor! . His life and career were depicted in the 2026 documentary film Zico, the Samurai of Quintino. He also appears as a member of the legendary squad Classic Eleven from the FIFA video games series.

On 9 September 2026, Zico received an honorary doctorate from Universidade Candido Mendes, in recognition of his contributions to Brazilian sport and culture, as well as his wider legacy in education, leadership and human rights.

== Playing statistics ==
=== Club ===
- This information is based on Zico's senior career totals.

Appearances and goals by club, season and competition
Club	Season	Division	League		Regional league		Cup		Continental		Total	
Club	Season	Division	Apps	Goals	Apps	Goals	Apps	Goals	Apps	Goals	Apps	Goals
Flamengo	1971	Série A	15	2	2	0	–		–		17	2
Flamengo	1972	Série A	4	0	2	0	–		–		6	0
Flamengo	1973	Série A	26	8	9	0	–		–		35	8
Flamengo	1974	Série A	19	11	31	19	–		–		50	30
Flamengo	1975	Série A	27	10	28	30	–		–		55	40
Flamengo	1976	Série A	20	14	27	18	–		–		47	32
Flamengo	1977	Série A	18	10	29	27	–		–		47	37
Flamengo	1978	Série A	0	0	22	19	–		–		22	19
Flamengo	1979	Série A	8	5	43	60	–		–		51	65
Flamengo	1980	Série A	19	21	26	12	–		–		45	33
Flamengo	1981	Série A	8	3	33	25	–		13	11	55^{4}	39
Flamengo	1982	Série A	23	20	21	21	–		4	2	48	43
Flamengo	1983	Série A	25	19	–		–		4	3	29	22
Flamengo	Total		212	123	273	231	–		21	16	507	370
Udinese	1983–84	Serie A	24	19	–		9	5	–		33	24
Udinese	1984–85	Serie A	15	3	–		5	3	–		20	6
Udinese	Total		39	22	–		14	8	–		53	30
Flamengo	1985	Serié A	3	1	3	2	–		–		6	3
Flamengo	1986	Serié A	0	0	4	3	–		–		4	3
Flamengo	1987	Serié A	12	5	5	1	–		–		17	6
Flamengo	1988	Serié A	14	4	6	0	–		–		20	4
Flamengo	1989	Serié A	8	2	11	2	7	3	1	0	27	7
Flamengo	Total		37	12	29	8	7	3	1	0	74	23
Sumitomo Metals	1991–92	JSL2	22	21	–		2	1	–		24	22
Kashima Antlers	1992	J.League	–		–		12	7	–		12	7
Kashima Antlers	1993	J.League	16	9	–		7	3	–		23	12
Kashima Antlers	1994	J.League	7	5	–		–		–		7	5
Kashima Antlers	Total		45	35	–		21	11	–		66	46
Career total			333	192	302	239	42	22	22	16	700	469

^{1}Include Copa do Brasil, Coppa Italia, JSL Cup, J.League Cup, and Emperor's Cup
^{2}Include Copa Libertadores and Supercopa Sudamericana
^{3}Campeonato Carioca extra tournament
^{4}Include Intercontinental Cup

=== International ===
Appearances and goals by national team and year
National team	Year	Apps	Goals
Brazil (official matches)	1976	9	6
Brazil (official matches)	1977	7	6
Brazil (official matches)	1978	11	3
Brazil (official matches)	1979	5	5
Brazil (official matches)	1980	5	4
Brazil (official matches)	1981	12	10
Brazil (official matches)	1982	11	8
Brazil (official matches)	1983	1	0
Brazil (official matches)	1984	0	0
Brazil (official matches)	1985	5	3
Brazil (official matches)	1986	5	3
Total		71	48

Goals by competition
Competition	Goals
Friendlies	30
FIFA World Cup qualification	11
FIFA World Cup tournaments	5
Copa América tournaments	2
Total	48

Scores and results list Brazil's goal tally first, score column indicates score after each Zico goal.

List of international goals scored by Zico
No.	Date	Venue	Opponent	Score	Result	Competition	Ref.
1	25 February 1976	Estadio Centenario, Montevideo, Uruguay	Uruguay	—	2–1	1976 Copa Río Branco	
2	27 February 1976	Estadio Monumental, Buenos Aires, Argentina	Argentina	—	2–1	1976 Roca Cup	
3	28 April 1976	Maracanã Stadium, Rio de Janeiro, Brazil	Uruguay	—	2–1	1976 Copa Río Branco	
4	31 May 1976	Yale Bowl, New Haven, USA	Italy	3–1	4–1	1976 U.S.A. Bicentennial Cup Tournament	
5	9 June 1976	Maracanã Stadium, Rio de Janeiro, Brazil	Paraguay	—	3–1	Taça Oswaldo Cruz	
6	1 December 1976	Maracanã Stadium, Rio de Janeiro, Brazil	Soviet Union	—	2–0	Friendly	
7	9 March 1977	Maracanã Stadium, Rio de Janeiro, Brazil	Colombia	2–0	6–0	1978 FIFA World Cup qualification	
8	23 June 1977	Maracanã Stadium, Rio de Janeiro, Brazil	Scotland	1–0	2–0	Friendly	
9	14 July 1977	Estadio Olímpico Pascual Guerrero, Cali, Colombia	Bolivia	1–0	8–0	1978 FIFA World Cup qualification	
10	14 July 1977	Estadio Olímpico Pascual Guerrero, Cali, Colombia	Bolivia	2–0	8–0	1978 FIFA World Cup qualification	
11	14 July 1977	Estadio Olímpico Pascual Guerrero, Cali, Colombia	Bolivia	4–0	8–0	1978 FIFA World Cup qualification	
12	14 July 1977	Estadio Olímpico Pascual Guerrero, Cali, Colombia	Bolivia	6–0	8–0	1978 FIFA World Cup qualification	
13	1 May 1978	Maracanã Stadium, Rio de Janeiro, Brazil	Peru	1–0	3–0	Friendly	
14	17 May 1978	Maracanã Stadium, Rio de Janeiro, Brazil	Czechoslovakia	2–0	2–0	Friendly	
15	14 June 1978	Estadio Malvinas Argentinas, Mendoza, Argentina	Peru	3–0	3–0	1978 FIFA World Cup	
16	17 May 1979	Maracanã Stadium, Rio de Janeiro, Brazil	Paraguay	3–0	6–0	Friendly	
17	17 May 1979	Maracanã Stadium, Rio de Janeiro, Brazil	Paraguay	4–0	6–0	Friendly	
18	17 May 1979	Maracanã Stadium, Rio de Janeiro, Brazil	Paraguay	5–0	6–0	Friendly	
19	2 August 1979	Maracanã Stadium, Rio de Janeiro, Brazil	Argentina	1–0	2–1	1979 Copa América	
20	16 August 1979	Estádio do Morumbi, São Paulo, Brazil	Bolivia	2–0	2–0	1979 Copa América	
21	24 June 1980	Mineirão, Belo Horizonte, Brazil	Chile	—	2–1	Friendly	
22	29 June 1980	Estádio do Morumbi, São Paulo, Brazil	Poland	1–1	1–1	Friendly	
23	30 October 1980	Estádio Serra Dourada, Goiânia, Brazil	Paraguay	1–0	6–0	Friendly	
24	30 October 1980	Estádio Serra Dourada, Goiânia, Brazil	Paraguay	2–0	6–0	Friendly	
25	8 February 1981	Olympic Stadium, Caracas, Venezuela	Venezuela	1–0	1–0	1982 FIFA World Cup qualification	
26	14 February 1981	Quito, Ecuador	Ecuador	1–0	6–0	Friendly	
27	14 March 1981	Estádio Santa Cruz, Ribeirão Preto, Brazil	Chile	—	2–1	Friendly	
28	22 March 1981	Maracanã Stadium, Rio de Janeiro, Brazil	Bolivia	1–0	3–1	1982 FIFA World Cup qualification	
29	22 March 1981	Maracanã Stadium, Rio de Janeiro, Brazil	Bolivia	2–0	3–1	1982 FIFA World Cup qualification	
30	22 March 1981	Maracanã Stadium, Rio de Janeiro, Brazil	Bolivia	3–1	3–1	1982 FIFA World Cup qualification	
31	29 March 1981	Estádio Serra Dourada, Goiânia, Brazil	Venezuela	4–0	5–0	1982 FIFA World Cup qualification	
32	12 May 1981	Wembley Stadium, London, England	England	1–0	1–0	Friendly	
33	15 May 1981	Parc des Princes, Paris, France	France	1–0	3–1	Friendly	
34	28 October 1981	Estádio Olímpico, Porto Alegre, Brazil	Bulgaria	2–0	3–0	Friendly	
35	3 March 1982	Estádio do Morumbi, São Paulo, Brazil	Czechoslovakia	1–0	1–1	Friendly	
36	5 May 1982	Estádio Governador João Castelo, São Luís, Brazil	Portugal	3–0	3–1	Friendly	
37	19 May 1982	Estádio do Arruda, Recife, Brazil	Switzerland	1–0	1–1	Friendly	
38	27 May 1982	Estádio Parque do Sabiá, Uberlândia, Brazil	Republic of Ireland	7–0	7–0	Friendly	
39	18 June 1982	Estadio Benito Villamarín, Seville, Spain	Scotland	1–1	4–1	1982 FIFA World Cup	
40	23 June 1982	Estadio Benito Villamarín, Seville, Spain	New Zealand	1–0	4–0	1982 FIFA World Cup	
41	23 June 1982	Estadio Benito Villamarín, Seville, Spain	New Zealand	2–0	4–0	1982 FIFA World Cup	
42	2 July 1982	Sarrià Stadium, Barcelona, Spain	Argentina	1–0	3–1	1982 FIFA World Cup	
43	8 June 1985	Estádio Beira-Rio, Porto Alegre, Brazil	Chile	1–0	3–1	Friendly	
44	8 June 1985	Estádio Beira-Rio, Porto Alegre, Brazil	Chile	3–0	3–1	Friendly	
45	16 June 1985	Estadio Defensores del Chaco, Asunción, Paraguay	Paraguay	2–0	2–0	1986 FIFA World Cup qualification	
46	30 April 1986	Estádio do Arruda, Recife, Brazil	Yugoslavia	1–0	4–2	Friendly	
47	30 April 1986	Estádio do Arruda, Recife, Brazil	Yugoslavia	2–2	4–2	Friendly	
48	30 April 1986	Estádio do Arruda, Recife, Brazil	Yugoslavia	3–2	4–2	Friendly	

== Managerial statistics ==
As of match played 1 December 2016

Managerial record by team and tenure
Team	Nat	From	To	Record				
Team	Nat	From	To	G	W	D	L	Win %
Kashima Antlers	(Japan)	20 August 1999	31 January 2000	15	10	2	3	66.67
Japan	(Japan)	1 July 2002	30 June 2006	71	37	16	18	52.11
Fenerbahce	(Turkey)	4 July 2006	30 June 2008	120	74	28	18	61.67
Bunyodkor	(Uzbekistan)	26 September 2008	8 January 2009	13	10	1	2	76.92
CSKA Moscow	(Russia)	9 January 2009	10 September 2009	35	20	5	10	57.14
Olympiacos	(Greece)	20 September 2009	19 January 2010	21	12	4	5	57.14
Iraq	(Iraq)	28 August 2011	27 November 2012	22	10	6	6	45.45
Al-Gharafa	(Qatar)	2 August 2013	30 January 2014	20	5	7	8	25.00
Goa	(India)	2 September 2014	18 December 2016	47	18	12	17	38.30
Career Total				364	196	81	87	53.85

== Honours ==
=== Player ===
Flamengo

- Campeonato Carioca: 1972, 1974, 1978, 1979, 1979 (extra), 1981, 1986
- Campeonato Brasileiro Série A: 1980, 1982, 1983
- Copa União: 1987
- Copa Libertadores: 1981
- Intercontinental Cup: 1981

Kashima Antlers

- J.League Suntory Series: 1993

Brazil

- FIFA World Cup third place: 1978
- Copa América third place: 1979
- Taça do Atlântico: 1976
- Copa Río Branco: 1976
- Taça Oswaldo Cruz: 1976
- Bicentennial Cup: 1976

Brazil U23

- CONMEBOL Pre-Olympic: 1971

Brazil Beach Soccer

- Beach Soccer World Championships: 1995, 1996

Individual

- Bola de Ouro: 1974, 1982
- Bola de Prata: 1974, 1975, 1977, 1982, 1987
- Campeonato Carioca top scorer: 1975 (30 goals), 1977 (27 goals), 1978 (19 goals), 1979 (26 goals), 1982 (21 goals)
- South American Footballer of the Year: 1977, 1981, 1982
- South American Footballer of the Year Silver Ball: 1976, 1980
- El Grafico (Note: Americas footballer of the year by El Grafico was an award that included over 130 journalists/tv broadcasters from South America) 2nd Best South American Player of the Year: 1981 (Note: Zico was second (524 pts), Diego Maradona first (572 pts) and Ubaldo Fillol finished 3d)
- Brazilian season top scorer: 1976 (63 goals), 1977 (48 goals), 1979 (81 goals), 1980 (53 goals), 1982 (59 goals)
- World XI: 1979, 1982
- Campeonato Brasileiro Série A top scorer: 1980 (21 goals), 1982 (21 goals)
- Guerin Sportivo All-Star Team: 1980, 1981, 1983
- Copa Libertadores Best Player: 1981
- Copa Libertadores top scorer: 1981
- Intercontinental Cup MVP Award: 1981
- Guerin Sportivo Player of the Year: 1981
- FIFA World Cup Bronze Boot: 1982
- FIFA World Cup All-Star Team: 1982
- World Soccer Player of the Year: 1983
- Chevron Award: 1984
- Serie A Team of The Year: 1984
- Serie A Player of the Year: 1984
- Beach Soccer World Championship top scorer: 1995 (12 goals)
- Beach Soccer World Championship Best Player: 1995
- FIFA Order of Merit: 1996
- FIFA 100: 2004
- Golden Foot Legends Award: 2006
- Brazilian Football Museum Hall of Fame: 2010
- Japan Football Hall of Fame: 2016
- IFFHS 3rd Best Brazilian Player of the 20th century
- IFFHS 7th Best South American Player of the 20th century
- IFFHS 14th Best Player of the 20th century
- FIFA 7th Best Player of the 20th century (FIFA Magazine and Grand Jury vote)
- France Football 9th Best Player of the 20th century
- World Soccer Magazine 18th Greatest Player of the 20th century
- Placar 16th Best Player of the 20th century
- IFFHS Legends
- International Football Hall of Fame: 24th place (1997)

Records

- Top scorer in Flamengo's history – 508 goals
- Top scorer in Maracanã Stadium – 333 goals
- Japan Soccer League record for goals scored in straight matches – 11 goals in 10 matches (1992)
- Flamengo record holder – Top scorer in a single season – 81 goals (1979)

=== Manager ===
Fenerbahçe

- Süper Lig: 2006–07
- Turkish Super Cup: 2007

Bunyodkor

- Uzbekistani Cup: 2008
- Uzbek League: 2008

CSKA Moscow

- Russian Super Cup: 2009
- Russian Cup: 2008–09

Japan

- Asian Cup: 2004

== See also ==
- List of men's footballers with 500 or more goals
- List of athletes who came out of retirement
- List of FIFA World Cup top goalscorers
- Mostafa Ziko
