= Paulo Vinícius Coelho =

Brazilian sports journalist

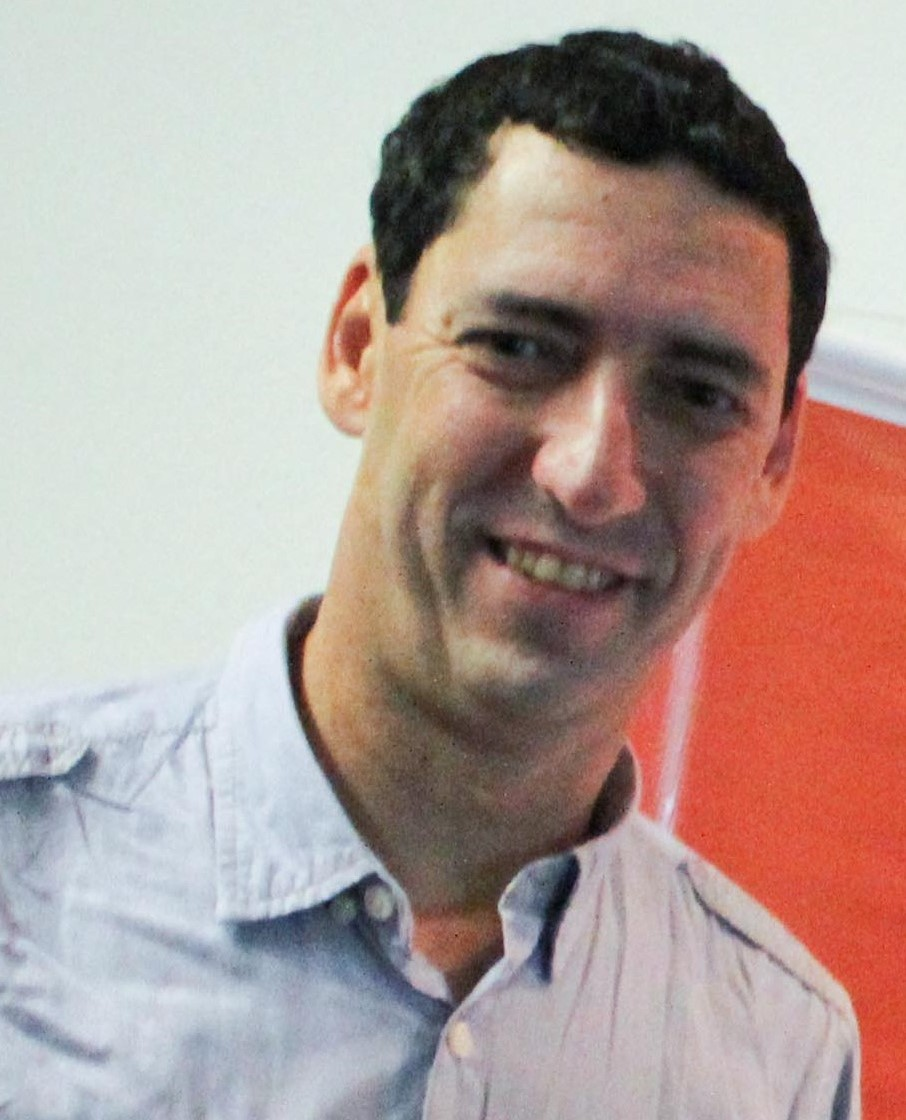
- Paulo Vinícius Coelho, in 2013
- Born: Paulo Vinicius de Mello Coelho; August 30, 1969 (age 57); São Paulo, Brazil
- Other name: PVC
- Education: Universidade Metodista
- Occupations: Journalist, writer
- Employer(s): SporTV; Fox Sports Brasil; ESPN Brasil; UOL; Folha de S.Paulo; Estadão; Lance! Placar
- Known for: Sports journalist

Paulo Vinicius de Mello Coelho (born 30 August 1969), also known as PVC, is a Brazilian sports journalist, specialized as an association football commenter.

== Life and career ==
Paulo Vinicius Coelho was born in 1969, in São Paulo. He graduated in journalism in 1990, at the Methodist University of São Bernardo do Campo.

He began his career as a reporter for Diário do Grande ABC in the same year, after working for small newspapers in São Bernardo do Campo. In 1991, he joined Editora Abril, first as an intern for the magazine A Semana em Ação, then as a reporter for Placar. He won the Abril awards in 1993, 1995, and 1997 for the best sports article published by the publisher.

In 1997, he moved to Lance! as a special reporter, columnist, and later executive editor. He left the newspaper in 2008 when he began writing for Folha de S.Paulo on September 1. In 2011, he left Folha and began writing a column for O Estado de S. Paulo. After the end of the partnership that formed Rádio Estadão/ESPN, PVC returned to Folha.

From 2000 onwards, he became a commentator for ESPN Brasil, being a regular member of the commentary team for the programs Bate-Bola 1ª edição, Linha de Passe and Loucos por Futebol. He also participated in editions of Fora de Jogo, on the sister channel ESPN. He also held the position of main commentator in game broadcasts for the channel and for Rádio Capital. He was frequently sent to commentate on UEFA Champions League matches and other European championships on-site, where, in addition to commentating during the broadcast, he participated in programs in the days leading up to the match, providing information obtained on-site. Between 2002 and 2009, he also held the position of head of reporting at ESPN Brasil, until leaving the position, which he held alongside commentator Mauro Cezar Pereira (who also left the position).

In early December 2014, he announced his departure from ESPN Brasil, and transferred to Fox Sports, where he began his activities on January 1, 2015.

Between 2015 and 2020, he wrote for Universo Online (UOL).

On 2 September 2016, he worked for Grupo Globo, for the sports coverage at Radio Globo and CBN.

PVC left Fox Sports in 2020 to negotiate his move to Grupo Globo,Signing a contract on January 21 and making his debut on February 3rd on the SporTV program "Bem, Amigos!".

After nearly three years at Rede Globo, he left the network, returned to UOL, and became a commentator of Copa Libertadores games at Paramount+.

=== Video games ===
Alongside the announcer Nivaldo Prieto, PVC commented the matches in the Brazilian versions of EA Sports' games FIFA 07, FIFA 08, FIFA 09 and FIFA 10.

== Books published ==
- Jornalismo Esportivo (2003)
- Os 50 Maiores Jogos das Copas do Mundo (2006)
- Futebol Passo a Passo: Técnica, Tática e Estratégia (2006)
- Bola Fora: A História do Êxodo do Futebol Brasileiro (2009)
- Os 55 Maiores Jogos das Copas do Mundo (2010)
- Os 100 Melhores Jogadores Brasileiros de Todos os Tempos (2010)
- Tática Mente (2014)
- O Planeta Neymar (2014)
- Escola Brasileira de Futebol (2018)
- Cinco Estrelas - A Conquista do Penta (2022)
- Reo - (2025)

== Awards ==
He won the prêmios Abril for "Best News Story" in 1993, 1994 e 1997.

He also won the Prêmio Comunique-se for "Best Sports Journalist": in 2008, 2011, 2016 and 2018, at the Print Media category", in 2012, at the "Electronic media category".
