= Deolinda Rodrigues =

Angolan revolutionary (1939–1968)

- Born: 10 February 1939; Catete, Portuguese West Africa
- Died: 1968 (aged 28–29); Kinkuzu, Democratic Republic of the Congo
- Other name: Langidila
- Relatives: Roberto Francisco de Almeida (brother); Agostinho Neto (cousin); Ruth Neto (cousin)
- Military career
- Allegiance: MPLA
- Service years: 1962–1968
- Conflicts: Angolan War of Independence †
- Other work: Writer; poet; translator; educator

Deolinda Rodrigues Francisco de Almeida (nom de guerre Langidila; 10 February 1939 – 1968) was an Angolan revolutionary, writer, and poet. She was a member of the Movimento Popular de Libertação de Angola (MPLA, transl. 'People's Movement for the Liberation of Angola') and, in addition to seeing combat, worked for the organisation as a translator, educator, and radio host.

Born into a Methodist family, she received a scholarship to study in Brazil, where she corresponded with Martin Luther King Jr. Fearing extradition to Portugal because of her work with the MPLA, she continued her education in the United States before returning to Africa. Rodrigues was the sole woman on the MPLA's central committee in the 1960s and co-founded the MPLA's women's wing, the Organização da Mulher de Angola (OMA, transl. 'Organization of Angolan Women'). She was also one of five women members of the Esquadrão Kamy (transl. 'Camy Squadron'), a guerilla unit tasked with reinforcing MPLA troops in Angola.

She was captured by a rival nationalist group in 1967 while attempting to reach Angola with the Esquadrão Kamy and was executed in 1968. The anniversary of her capture is celebrated as the "Day of the Angolan Woman" in Angola, and a documentary about her life was released in 2014.

== Early life and education ==
Deolinda Rodrigues Francisco de Almeida was born in Catete, Angola, on 10 February 1939. Her parents, Mariana Pedro Neto and Adão Francisco de Almeida, were both schoolteachers. Her father was also a Methodist minister. She had four siblings, including Angolan politician Roberto Francisco de Almeida. In 1954, Rodrigues moved with her mother and siblings to the capital Luanda and lived with her aunt Maria da Silva, in the same house as her son, the poet Agostinho Neto, who went on to become the first president of Angola.

Rodrigues attended elementary school at the Escola da Missão Evangélica (transl. 'Evangelical Mission School') and high school at the Liceu Salvador Correia (transl. 'Salvador Correia High School'), where she studied Germanic languages. In 1956, as a teenager, she began working as a translator and organizer for the MPLA, and by 1958, she had joined the United Methodist Youth, writing poetry for the Methodist periodical O Estandarte (transl. 'The Banner'). During the late 1950s, however, she began to question the paternal attitude of both the government and the church.

Rodrigues's work with the MPLA led her into conflict with the Portuguese authorities, particularly the Polícia Internacional e de Defesa do Estado (PIDE, transl. 'International and State Defense Police'), and by 1959, PIDE had placed a warrant out for her arrest. Rodrigues fled to Brazil, where she began attending the Chácara Flora Methodist Institute in São Paulo on scholarship, studying sociology and exchanging letters with American civil rights leader Martin Luther King Jr. Rodrigues, who spoke English, French, German, Kimbundu, and Portuguese, corresponded with King in English, discussing with him various strategies for advancing the Angolan independence movement, including the use of symbolic leadership figures to represent it.

In 1960, fearing that her arrest warrant would lead to her deportation from Brazil following a proposed Brazilian-Portuguese extradition treaty, Rodrigues moved to the United States, this time studying at Drew University. However, in 1962, she returned to Africa without finishing her studies to rejoin the MPLA.

== Work with the MPLA ==
Rodrigues spent some time in Conakry, Guinea, in 1962 before departing for Léopoldville, Congo-Léopoldville, where many Angolan refugees had taken up residence and the MPLA had established political and military committees. While there she founded the OMA, the women's division of the MPLA. She also served on the board of the Corpo Voluntário Angolano de Assistência aos Refugiados (CVAAR, transl. 'Voluntary Corps for the Assistance of Angolan Refugees'), which offered medical and social services for Angolan refugees in Congo-Léopoldville. She was the sole woman on the MPLA's central committee in the 1960s.

During the 1960s and 1970s, the MPLA was opposed by the Frente Nacional de Libertação de Angola (FNLA, transl. 'National Liberation Front of Angola'), (Note: The FNLA was originally known as the União dos Povos do Norte de Angola (UPA, transl. 'Union of Peoples of Northern Angola'). It changed its name in 1962, but many sources use both acronyms interchangeably during this period.) with both factions seeking to gain control over the Angolan liberation movement. Skirmishes between the two organizations were common in northern Angola and the outskirts of Luanda. In October 1963, the government of Congo-Léopoldville, which was sympathetic to the FNLA, expelled the MPLA, forcing them to relocate in November to Brazzaville, in neighbouring Congo-Brazzaville.

Rodrigues, who moved with the MPLA to Congo-Brazzaville, continued her work with CVAAR. She also taught and organized literacy classes; traveled abroad to advocate for the acceptance of Angolan international students in Bulgaria, Austria, and the Soviet Union; and hosted an MPLA radio program entitled A Voz de Angola Combatente (transl. 'A Voice for Fighting Angola').

Rodrigues's writings from the time expressed frustration at the culture of misogyny within the MPLA, her perceived invisibility as a woman in the independence movement, and the prejudice she faced for her lack of domesticity. In 1964, she wrote in her diary that people wanted her to believe that being single was "shameful or of the devil." Later that month, after the MPLA prevented her from traveling to Ghana on account of her womanhood, she wrote in her diary that the "discrimination" shown to her by the MPLA "revol[ted]" her. She also wrote about her admiration for Marxism–Leninism during this time, stating in a 1965 diary entry that:

Marixism–Leninism is rich enough in ideological resources and experience to find appropriate ways to overcome these difficulties, to overcome obstacles. The question is whether you are determined to do it. And I believe that we must fight for that, we must fight for unity ... Because imperialism exists and is dangerous and aggressive. The underdeveloped world exists and is there, fighting in Angola, Vietnam, Latin America ... Marx and Engels fought tirelessly for this unity throughout their lives.

In 1966, Rodrigues relocated to the Angolan exclave of Cabinda, where she joined the Esquadrão Kamy, a unit consisting of several hundred men and five women (Note: The exact number is disputed. Araújo says that there were "200 men and 5 women." Rodríguez says that there were "150 combatants." George likewise says that there were "150 guerillas." Paredes says that the "squadron consisted of 127 freedom fighters.") trained by Cuban internationalists in the principles of guerilla warfare. She later traveled to Dolisie, Congo-Brazzaville, where she received training from the internationalist militant Rafael Mórecen Limonta.

== Death and legacy ==
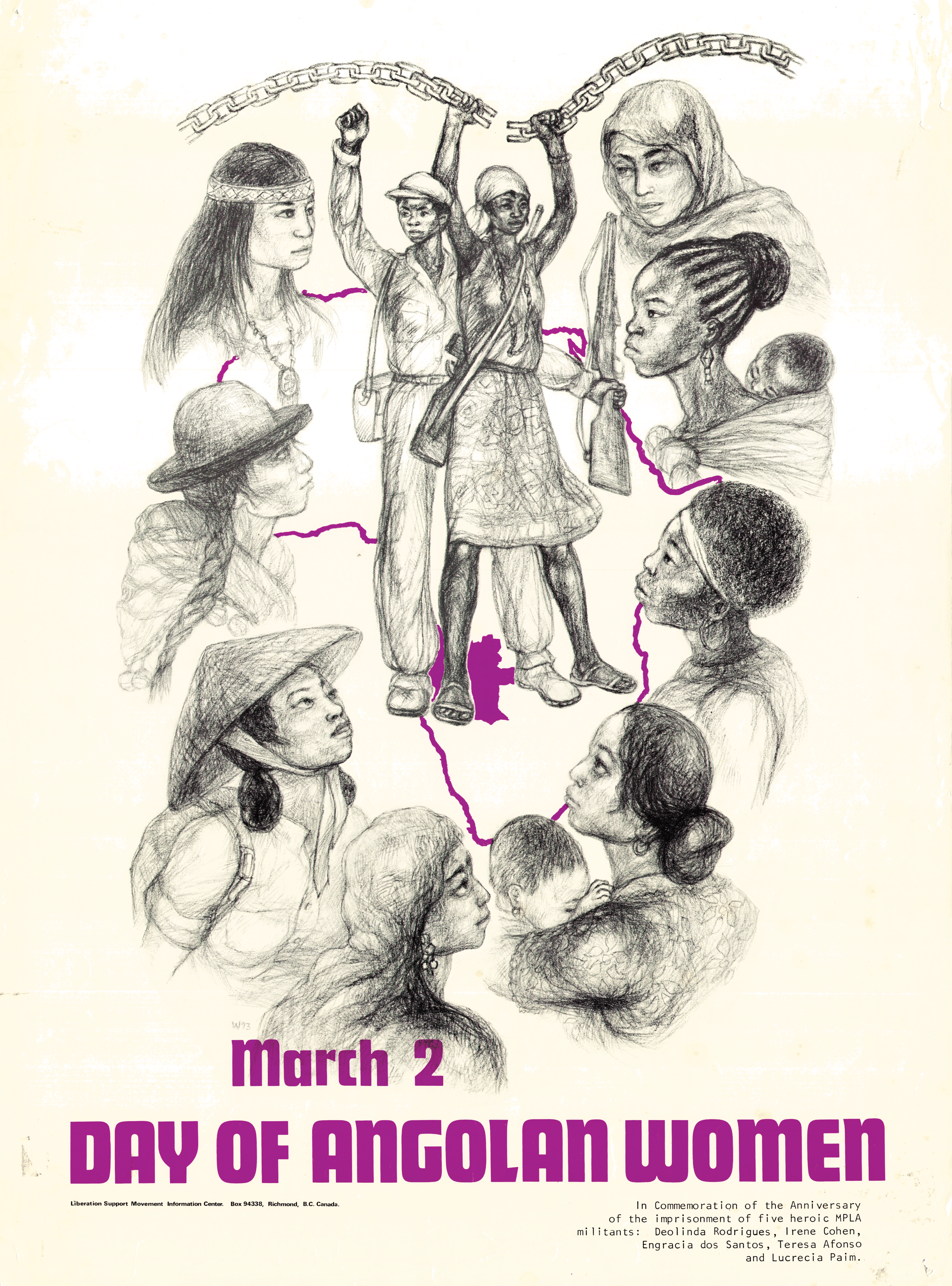
Poster produced by the Liberation Support Movement Information Centre in Richmond, B.C. for the Day of Angolan Women

The Esquadrão Kamy set out for Angola in January 1967 to reinforce the MPLA's soldiers there. Rodrigues was injured soon after they arrived and had to be carried by her companions on a stretcher for some amount of time. The squadron struggled to navigate for several days, leading to the death by starvation of four squadron members. An attempt to cross the flooded Ambriz River led to 25 more casualties. Rodrigues and a small group split off to return to Congo-Brazzaville but were ambushed by the FNLA and captured near Songololo. She was held in a prison in Kinkuzu for several months and executed in prison sometime in 1968. (Note: Faustino says that she was tortured and dismembered alive. The precise date of her death is not known, but according to Paredes, she was able to write a letter in late December 1967 and a poem in March 1968, proving that she was kept alive in prison at least until then.)

Rodrigues's legacy has been defined by her support for Angolan nationalism and for the MPLA. She is regarded as a "heroine" in Angola according to Portuguese anthropologist Margarida Paredes. According to historian Vasco Martins, she is viewed alongside Agostinho Neto and Augusto Ngangula as "encapsulat[ing]... the standard of behavior and civic conduct" desired by the MPLA, which has governed Angola since 1975. 2 March, the day of Rodrigues's capture, is celebrated in Angola as the "Day of the Angolan Woman," and in 1986, a monument was erected to Rodrigues and the five other female members of the Esquadrão Kamy in Heroines' Square in Luanda.

Some Angolan women have criticized the 2 March date, feeling unrepresented by figures such as Rodrigues due to her ties to the ruling MPLA. Others have criticized the monument in Heroines' Square, with journalist Pedro Cardoso arguing that the public lionization of the women of the Esquadrão Kamy has failed to engender support for Angolan women as a whole. In 2017, the monument was vandalized, with the statue being detached from its base.

Rodrigues's diary was published posthumously under the title Diário de um Exilio sem Regresso (transl. 'Diary of an Exile Without Return'). Her letters and correspondence were published in 2004 under the title Cartas de Langidila e Outros Documentos (transl. 'Letters of Langidila and other Documents').

In 2010, filming began on a documentary about Rodrigues's life. Filmed in Angola, Brazil and Mozambique, the film features interviews with associates of Rodrigues and incorporates text from Rodrigues's diaries. It took four years for the documentary to reach completion. Langidila—Diário de um Exílio sem Regresso (transl. 'Langidila—Diary of an Exile Without Return') was released in 2014.

== Selected works ==
- Rodrigues, Deolinda (2003). de Almeida, Roberto (ed.). Diário de um Exilio sem Regresso [Diary of an Exile Without Return] (in Portuguese) (1a ed.). Luanda, Angola: Editorial Nzila. ISBN 978-972-8-82314-6.
- Rodrigues, Deolinda (2004). de Almeida, Roberto (ed.). Cartas de Langidila e Outros Documentos [Letters of Langidila and other Documents] (in Portuguese and Kimbundu) (1a ed.). Luanda, Angola: Editorial Nzila. ISBN 978-972-8-82378-8.
