= Youth of MPLA =

- Juventude do MPLA
- Logo of JMPLA

- Flag of JMPLA
- Formation: 1962
- Type: Youth wing of MPLA
- Headquarters: Luanda, Angola
- Official language: Portuguese
- 1st National Secretary: Crispiniano Vivaldino Evaristo dos Santos

The Youth of MPLA (Portuguese: Juventude do MPLA, JMPLA) is a major mass organization within the People's Movement for the Liberation of Angola - Party of Labour, along with the Organização da Mulher Angolana (Angolan Women's Organization), União Nacional dos Trabalhadores Angolanos (National Union of Angolan Workers) and the Organização de Pioneiros de Agostinho Neto (Agostinho Neto Pioneer Organization).

Jonas Savimbi, leader of UNITA from 1966 until 2002, was briefly a member of the JMPLA in the early 1960s.
