= Methodist University of São Paulo =

Private university in São Paulo, Brazil

- Universidade Metodista de São Paulo (UMESP)
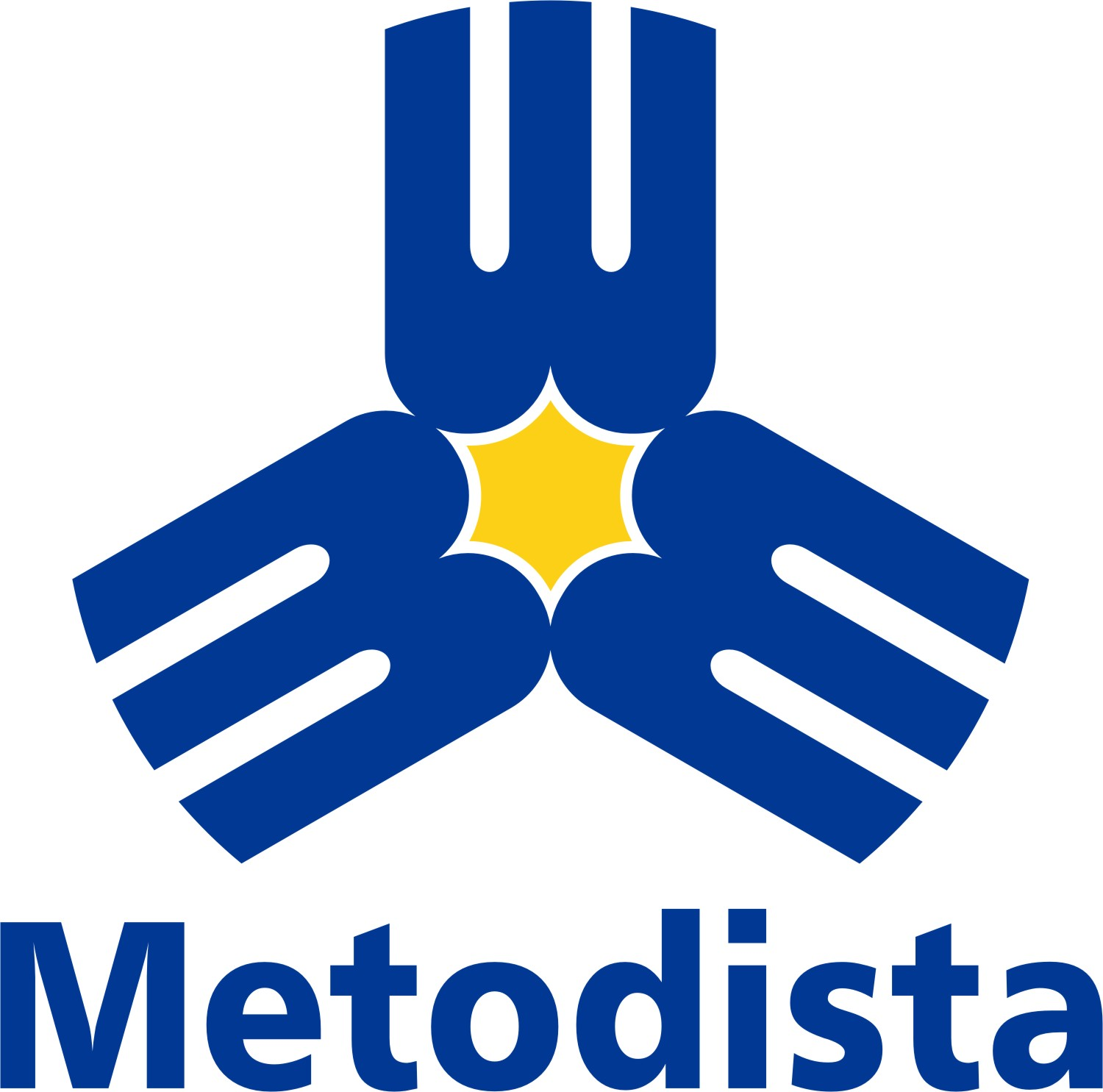
- Logo of Methodist University of São Paulo.
- Other names: Instituto Metodista de Ensino Superior (IMS)
- Established: 1938
- Religious affiliation: Methodism
- Location: São Bernardo do Campo, São Paulo, Brazil
- Website: metodista.br

The Universidade Metodista de São Paulo (Methodist University of São Paulo), also known as UMESP or simply Metodista, is a private university based in the city of São Bernardo do Campo, in the state of São Paulo, Brazil.

Metodista currently enrolls over 18,000 students, with most popular programs in the areas of communications and theology.

== History ==
Metodista traces its history to 1938, when the Methodists created the Methodist Church Theology College by the Anchieta highway, in São Bernardo do Campo. In 1970, the Methodist Institute of Higher Education (Portuguese: Instituto Metodista de Ensino Superior—IMS) was created and in 1997, and the institution gained university status.

== Graduate programs ==
The school offers 40 different graduate and over 60 post-grad programs. It also offers K through 11 programs.

== Notable former pupils ==
Among many notable alumni are: Celso Zucatelli, Reinaldo Azevedo and Paulo Vinícius Coelho who graduated in journalism; Dalton Vigh who graduated in publicity and advertising; and Joana Tomás who graduated in communications.

== Campus ==
The university has, in total, three campi in São Bernardo:

- Rudge Ramos
- Vergueiro
- Planalto

== See also ==
- Free Methodist College
