= Zico, the Samurai of Quintino =

2026 film documentary

- Portuguese: Zico, o Samurai de Quintino
- Directed by: João Wainer
- Written by: Thiago Iacocca
- Produced by: André Wainer; Bruno Tinoco; Gabriel Wainer; Luiz Porto; Pedro Curi
- Starring: Zico; Ronaldo; Léo Júnior; José Carlos Araújo; Paulo César Carpegiani; Carlos Alberto Parreira; Mauro Beting; Daniela Boaventura
- Production companies: Globo Filmes; SporTV
- Distributed by: Downtown Filmes
- Release date: 30 April 2026 (Brazil)
- Running time: 103 minutes
- Country: Brazil
- Language: Portuguese

Zico, the Samurai of Quintino (Portuguese: Zico, o samurai de Quintino) is a Brazilian documentary film directed by João Wainer and released on April 30, 2026. The documentary aims to examine the career of soccer player Zico, an icon of CR Flamengo.

== Background ==
A Santos FC fan, João Wainer, decided to make a documentary about one of the greatest icons in the history of CR Flamengo, Zico. The documentary features rare footage, archival footage, and never-before-seen behind-the-scenes footage of the athlete’s life and career. According to information from the ge, sports portal from Grupo Globo, production of the documentary began in 2023, with filming in Rio de Janeiro, particularly in the Quintino neighborhood in the city’s North Zone, where the athlete was born and raised, and in Japan, in the city of Kashima, where Zico played for the Kashima Antlers.

The production was a partnership between Globo Filmes and SporTV, with distribution by Downtown Filmes. Screenwriter Thiago Iacocca worked on the film, and the production team included André Wainer, Bruno Tinoco, Gabriel Wainer, Luiz Porto, and Pedro Curi.

== Cast ==
The film features testimonials from:

- Zico;
- Ronaldo;
- Léo Júnior;
- José Carlos Araújo;
- Paulo César Carpegiani;
- Carlos Alberto Parreira;
- Mauro Beting;
- Daniela Boaventura;

== Release ==
The film was released on April 30, 2026, premiering in 511 theaters across Brazil. The film’s premiere party, held at the Village Mall cinema in Barra da Tijuca, a neighborhood in Rio de Janeiro, was attended by artists such as Marcos Palmeira, Flamengo president Luiz Eduardo Baptista, and former referee Arnaldo Cezar Coelho, as well as several athletes including Andrade, Pedro, Jorginho, Lucas Paquetá, Rodrigo Caio, Cláudio Adão, and Léo Ortiz. In São Paulo, there was also a premiere screening at Shopping Iguatemi in the Jardins neighborhood, attended by Zico.

== Reception ==
According to journalist Alícia Carracena of Quem magazine, the documentary drew an audience of over 65,000 viewers in theaters. In its opening week, the film became the fifth most-watched movie in the country, grossing over 360,000 reais.

=== Critical reception ===
Angelo Cordeiro, writing for Rolling Stone Brazil, gave the documentary a positive review and noted that “beyond the reverence for the idol—and, for some, the hero.” The documentary reaffirms something that is often said with a certain cynicism [...] Getting to know Zico does not diminish what he represents; on the contrary, it amplifies it. By revealing his more human layers, the film suggests that some journeys do not need to be shielded from reality." Marcelo Janot, of the newspaper O Globo, gave the film a positive review: “Contrary to expectations of a work intended only for the already converted, the documentary ‘Zico, the Samurai of Quintino,’ directed by João Wainer, balances the athlete’s career with an engaging portrait of the human being Arthur Antunes Coimbra.” however, he criticized an excess of material on Japan, given Zico’s performance in Brazil.

Marcos Augusto Gonçalves, writing for the Folha de S.Paulo newspaper, gave the film a positive review and noted, “Between its successes and questionable choices, the film deepens interest in Zico’s life and leaves a lasting impression on the viewer.” Luiz Oricchio, writing for the São Paulo newspaper O Estado de S. Paulo, noted that “the documentary does not fail to recall the low points of this career full of highs.”
