= Placar =

Brazilian sports magazine

- Editor: Luiz Felipe Castro
- Categories: Football
- Frequency: Monthly (1991-2001, 2003-present); Weekly (1970-1991, 2001-2003)
- First issue: March 20, 1970
- Company: Editora Score
- Country: Brazil
- Language: Portuguese
- Website: placar.com.br
- ISSN: 0104-1762

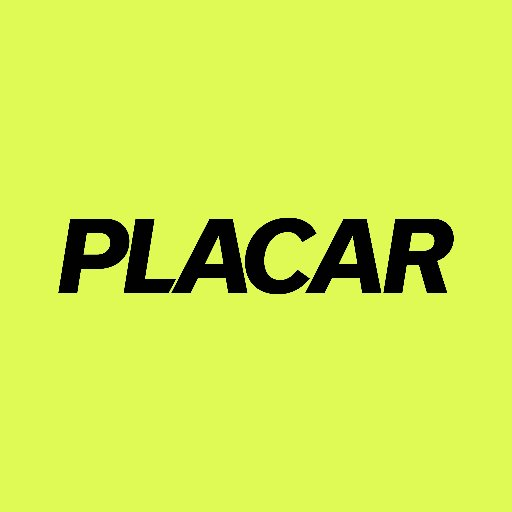

Placar (English: Score; stylized in all caps) is a monthly Brazilian sports magazine. Its first edition was issued by Editora Abril. on March 20, 1970, and since then it has become the most successful sports publication in Brazil, even though it focuses fully on football. It is currently published by Editora Score.

== History ==
=== First weekly period ===
The magazine was published on a weekly basis throughout the 1970s, and the 1980s, until August 1990. It was launched just before the 1970 World Cup, in order to fill the void of a national publication about the sport, and Pelé was featured on the cover of the first edition, which sold almost 200,000 copies. The magazine defended the modernization of the administration of Brazilian football, and on issues number 23 and 24, in 1970, a series of articles by Michel Laurence and Narciso James proposed many changes, among them the creation of a forsooth national championship, which would be created in 1971.

=== Consolidation ===
In the very beginning, the sales were a success: it sold over 100,000 weekly copies during the 1970 World Cup. But, after the end of the tournament, sales dropped to an average of 40,000 copies. In order to reduce costs, in 1972 a pullout was created, starting with the number 131. Made with cheaper paper, it contained the "Tabelão", a listing of results and boxscores the magazine called "the Official Diary of Brazilian football". It also featured "fresher" news, such as the weekend games, while the magazine itself brought more timeless articles, such as profiles and columns about games from the previous week. The pullout was canceled by late 1974.

Sales were sustained mostly by the same football lottery that later would be the target of an investigation by the magazine. With tips and collective bets, in 1972 Placar sold 250,000 copies one week because of an article about the lottery.

=== "Football Lottery Mafia" ===
In 1979, Milton Coelho da Graça, then-director of Placar, explained to Juca Kfouri, then-director of special projects who handled the section about the football lottery, that he had been noticing some coincidences when few people won. Milton asked, and Kfouri went to Brasília and asked to see the winning tickets, but was denied with an allegation of bank secrecy.

In the same year, Milton left Abril, and Kfouri was promoted to his post. Still suspecting about the lottery, every end of month he incited the newsroom, to no avail: "Who is man enough to uncover the unfairness of the soccer lottery?" During another trip to Brasília, he asked again to see the winning tickets. This time, some were shown: "One put a triple bet in games other people would try to guess," Kfouri told later. "Corinthians x Juventus, triple. Flamengo x Olaria, triple. Vasco x Botafogo, Vasco. Atlético-PR x Coritiba, Coritiba. Inter x Livramento, triple. That's impossible. They play the triple bet in easy games and simple bets in hard ones. There's something strange going on here."

The day after commenting about his suspicions in the newsroom, he found a volunteer for the task: Sérgio Martins. Kfouri gave him a one-year deadline, rigorously met: on issue 648, dated October 22, 1982, an extensive story was published on the case, denouncing corruption and match-fixing.

None of the 125 people named, among them players, directors, referees, managers and celebrities, was arrested. The lottery lost credibility, which was never recovered again. Ironically, Placar sales were also negatively affected by the piece, since many readers bought the magazine exactly for its weekly lottery analysis.

=== End of weekly editions ===
Other efforts were made to try and reach new audiences, such as in 1984, when the magazine opened a larger room for sports other than football. The experience lasted from April to November, when the other sports, along with the slogan "All sports" ("Todos os esportes"), were dropped from the cover and started to receive less attention from the magazine. In September 1985, for the 800th edition, the traditional "Tabelão" section, with the listing of local boxscores and results from abroad, was removed because it was deemed too expensive. One year later, in September 1986, the section made its comeback after protests of over 600 readers, by mail and phone. At first, the section covered just the 1986 Brazilian League, but later, gradually, it was extended to other tournaments. With stagnated sales numbers since 1985, another effort was made in 1988, with a bigger format, less pages and a cheaper paper, in a phase known as Placar Mais. In the outset, it became Abril's best-selling magazine, even though it turned a loss if too many copies were sold, hence a limit was set.

The good times didn't last long, though, since the magazine never sold many ad pages. The fatal blow came with the Brazilian flop in the 1990 World Cup, that was aggravated by the terrible campaigns of the bigger teams in the 1990 Paulista League (small clubs Bragantino and Novorizontino made the finals that year) and the controversial finals of the Carioca League (the title was decided in the courts). Placar always turned a profit with commemorative editions of titles, but that year this option wasn't available, and Abril decided to stop investing in a weekly football magazine.

After years of bad results (between 1979, and 1995, the magazine's results were in the black for just three years), cuts were made in the newsroom, and the magazine was no longer published weekly. Just one year earlier, the letter from the editor of the 1,000th issue stated that Placar reached that milestone "healthy" and with average sales of 127,000 copies.

=== Thematic editions ===
A special about Pelé's 50th birthday, had sales of 99,700 of the 100,000 copies that were printed. The special edition even earned Placar an Esso Prize, the third the magazine has won.

The success of that edition made Kfouri propose that Abril kept a line of thematic magazines with a small newsroom. Abril approved the idea, as long as there was no periodicity, but the timetable for 1991 called for 12 issues. "We made the 12," recalled Kfouri. "No one mentioned the magazine as 'Placar, Abril's monthly football magazine', but it was a fact that it was monthly. And its results began to live in the black ink." The only months when there was no numbered editions were December 1993, July 1994, August 1994 and February 1995. The magazine maintained its critic position of the Brazilian football brass, which made the president of Federação Paulista de Futebol, Eduardo José Farah, deny the publication's photographers entrance on the field for the 1991 Brazilian League finals, between Bragantino and São Paulo, in Bragança Paulista.

During the 1994 World Cup, special editions were launched after every game the Brazil national team played. They were produced directly in Brazil with inferior paper, but the sales, weak for the first edition, grew steadily after each game. Starting with the fourth special edition, the sales were satisfactory, and the commemorative edition after the title sold over 500,000 copies. The series produced a profit of 500,000 dollars.

This was the era when the magazine had its higher figure for a price: in August 1993, it cost 290,000 cruzeiros reais.

=== "Futebol, sexo e rock 'n roll" ===
The success generated by the 1994 World Cup editions and the Brazilian victory itself triggered big changes starting April 1995, just after the magazine celebrated its 25th anniversary. Those changes included the exits of every journalist of the newsroom, except Manoel Coelho and Paulo Vinicius Coelho. Approximately 1 million dollars were invested, with young adults as a target. The new slogan would be "Futebol, sexo e rock 'n roll" ("Football, Sex and Rock 'n Roll"). The format was also changed, to 27,5 cm x 35,8 cm, and, for the first time in its history, Placar sold subscriptions. American designer Roger Black was charged with the graphical project. The first edition of the new phase, with Edmundo as cover athlete, sold 350,000 copies.

Just a few months later, Kfouri left Placar and Abril because of interferences by the brass with the magazine. To Abril, it was not interesting to denounce Brazilian soccer brass in a pullout that circulated with the monthly editions, because it feared for the TV contracts TVA, also from Abril, had. Roberto Civita, Abril's president, offered Kfouri the name of the magazine for a price, since Placar didn't turn a profit and the publisher would also get rid of the possibility of being sued again, but the negotiations didn't go any further.

During the next few years, a few visual (such as yet another new format, to 22,6 cm × 29,9 cm, in 1996) and content (football once again was the main theme) adjustments were made. During the 1998 World Cup, Placar again published special editions after each Brazilian game, but, this time, many professionals were sent to host country France — even the page design was made there. The huge costs and the sagging sales (compared to the previous World Cup) made for a flop.

=== Second weekly phase and current format ===
Once again, Placar was being published sporadically, albeit in a larger quantity than the previous "sporadic period", in 1990. Each special, even the simultaneous ones, was numbered. But in May 2003 the magazine was back to a monthly periodicity, and the specials no longer followed the numbering. In March 2008, an article about TV color man and former player Casagrande's internment raised a controversy, with journalists defending and criticizing the magazine's posture.

== Bola de Prata ==
Bola de Prata is an annual award given by Placar to the Campeonato Brasileiro Série A best players from each position. Each player is given a rating after every match they play. The players with highest average rating from each position are awarded the Bola de Prata. The player with highest average rating overall is awarded the Bola de Ouro.
