= Luzia Inglês Van-Dúnem =

Angolan politician, feminist and expert in military telecommunications

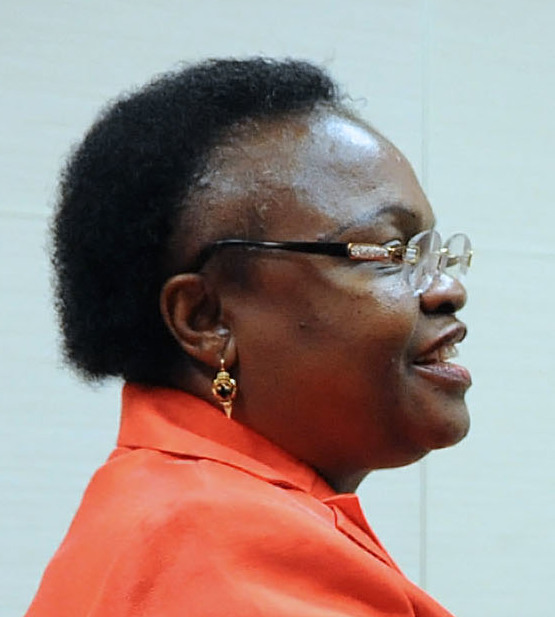
- Born: 11 January 1948 (age 78); Luanda
- Citizenship: Angola
- Occupation: Politician
- Known for: Secretary-General of the Organization for Angolan Women
- Political party: People's Movement for the Liberation of Angola

Luzia Pereira de Sousa Inglês Van-Dúnem (born 11 January 1948) is an Angolan politician, feminist and expert in military telecommunications. She is a member of the Angolan National Assembly, as a member of the Popular Movement for the Liberation of Angola (MPLA).

== Biography ==
Van-Dúnem was born in Luanda, Angola, on 11 January 1948 and is the daughter of the Methodist minister, Guilherme Inglês. In 1961, Inglês was assassinated by colonial forces in the aftermath of the 15 March uprising. Her mother died shortly afterwards, and she and her sisters joined the Movimento Popular de Libertação de Angola (MPLA; People’s Liberation Movement of Angola). From 1964 to 1967, she was in Kinshasa and Brazzaville with the MPLA; in Brazzaville, she undertook military training. In 1968, she travelled to the Soviet Union for telecommunications training. In 1973, she became head of the Communications Station in Cassamba. During Angola's War of Independence, Van-Dúnem was a radio broadcaster in the 2nd and 3rd military political regions. From 1976 to 1991, she was in charge of the Commander-in-Chief of the Angola Armed Forces' communications centre.

Van-Dúnem married Afonso Van-Dúnem M'binda, a former Angolan ambassador to the United Nations (UN), and they had four children. Whilst M'binda was appointed ambassador in 1991, Van-Dúnem also worked for the UN and coordinated the African Women's Group. In 1999, Van-Dúnem was elected Secretary-General of the Organização da Mulher Angolana (OMA), which is the women's branch of political party, the People's Movement for the Liberation of Angola (MPLA), and was re-elected in 2005. In 2008 she was elected to the Angolan parliament, in the first elections since 1992. A champion of women's rights, she was a key proponent of the introduction of a law which meant that at least 30% of the proposed individuals on a political party's lists have to be women. This has increased the representation of women in parliament and at the 2008 election, women made up 36% of elected members.

In 2014, she became the first Angolan woman to be promoted to the post of General Officer of the Angolan Armed Forces; the promotion was decreed by President José Eduardo dos Santos. In the 2017 general elections, Van-Dúnem was elected deputy from Angola by the National Electoral Circle. In 2020,she was elected Regional Secretary of the Pan-African Women's Organization (OPM).
