= Agostinho Neto Pioneer Organization =

- Organização de Pioneiros Agostinho Neto
- Formation: 1 December 1963; 62 years ago
- Type: Pioneer movement
- Location: Angola
- Parent organization: Youth of MPLA

Agostinho Neto Pioneer Organization (Portuguese: Organização de Pioneiros Agostinho Neto, OPA) is a pioneer movement in Angola. It is part of the People's Movement for the Liberation of Angola (MPLA). OPA is led in its day-to-day affairs by the MPLA Youth.

== History ==
It was founded on 1 December 1963 as the "Kudianguelas" by MPLA co-founder Lúcio Lara. It was originally created for the children of guerrillas. Founded as the Pioneers in 1975, the organization took the name of the nation's first president Agostinho Neto at its second conference in November 1979, following Neto's death.

In the 1980s, it received support from East Germany, which sent the pioneering organization a lecturer to Angola for socialist indoctrination in August 1982. In December 2003, a cooperation protocol was signed between OPA and the Angolan Ministry of Education, and in October 2014 also with the Ministry of Culture, the National Children's Institute and the Scout Association. In 2004 it had about 147,000 and in 2014 about 600,000 members aged 8 to 17 in all 18 provinces of the country.

== Mission ==
The OPA aims to improve knowledge of national symbols, reinforce national values, with a view to preserving national identity, as well as moral, civic and patriotic education. To this end, it organizes cultural, social and recreational activities such as the Children's Carnival, the National Song Festival, performing arts competitions, excursions to monuments and places of historical interest and, in collaboration with the scouts, excursions and holiday camps.
