= Organization of Angolan Women =

Political organisation in Angola

The Organization of Angolan Women (Portuguese: Organização Mulher Angolana (OMA)) is a political organisation in Angola, which was founded in 1962 to target women to support the People's Movement for the Liberation of Angola. It was co-founded by Deolinda Rodrigues Francisco de Almeida.

== History ==
The Organization of Angolan Women was established in 1962 and was originally founded to rally support for the new political party known as the MPLA. Once Angola was officially independent of Portugal in 1975 following the Angolan War of Independence, the Organization of Angolan Women provided the best opportunity for female activism in local government. Total involvement faltered in the 1980s. In 1985 membership reached 1.8 million, but by 1987 membership dropped to fewer than 1.3 million. Rural violence and regional destabilization disheartened many of the rural members. However, it was also during the 1980s that Angola passed the first anti-discrimination laws and established strict literacy laws to support uneducated women.

The organization established its first national executive body in 1976, and it elected Ruth Neto, the sister of the president of Angola, as the national co-ordinator for OMA. When the organization was restructured in 1983, she was elected as the secretary general of the OMA and the head of its fifty-three-member national committee. She was re-elected on March 2, 1988, and served as the secretary general for twenty-one years. The OMA expanded education for women and created programs to increase literacy among women, and during the 1980s the Angolan government created laws against gender discrimination in wages and working conditions.

In 1999, Luzia Inglês Van-Dúnem was elected secretary-general of the OMA, and she was re-elected in 2005. She was succeeded in 2021 by Joana Tomás. In 2026, Emília Dias was elected to succeed Tomás.

== Secretaries general ==
- Ruth Neto (served as national co-ordinator from 1976–1983; elected secretary general in 1983; re-elected 1988)
- Luzia Inglês Van-Dúnem (elected 1999; re-elected 2005)
- Joana Tomás (elected 2021)
- Emília Dias (elected 2026)
