= Soncini =

Soncini is a surname. Notable people with the surname include:

- Eugenio Soncini (1906–1993), Italian architect
- Giovanni Soncini, 16th-century Italian painter
- Giuseppe Soncini (1926–1991), Italian politician
- Guia Soncini (born 1972), Italian journalist, columnist, and writer
