= Il Riformista =

Italian political and financial newspaper

- Type: Daily newspaper
- Format: Berliner
- Owner: Romeo Editore srl
- Founder: Claudio Velardi
- Editor: Claudio Velardi
- Founded: 23 October 2002
- Ceased publication: 30 March 2012
- Relaunched: 29 October 2019
- Political alignment: Liberalism
- Language: Italian
- Headquarters: Rome, Italy
- Circulation: 15.000 (2019)
- ISSN: 1723-8080
- OCLC number: 464785916
- Website: ilriformista.it

Il Riformista (English: "The Reformist") is an Italian political and financial newspaper based in Rome, Italy.

== History and profile ==
Launched on 23 October 2002, Il Riformista was formed of about four pages with orange as main colour used. The paper closed on 30 March 2012 because of financial problems. It was later relaunched on 29 October 2019. In 2023, former Italian prime minister Matteo Renzi was appointed as editor. Renzi resigned as editor in 2024 and was replaced by Alessandro Barbano and then Claudio Velardi.

== Editors-in-chief ==
- Antonio Polito (2002–2006)
- Stefano Cingolani (2006)
- Paolo Franchi (2006–2008)
- Antonio Polito (2008–2010)
- Stefano Cappellini (2010–2011)
- Emanuele Macaluso (2011–2012)

Publications suspended from 2012 to 2019

- Piero Sansonetti (2019–2023)
- Matteo Renzi and Andrea Ruggieri (2023–2024)
- Alessandro Barbano (2024)
- Claudio Velardi (since 2024)

== Columnist and journalists ==
=== Past columnists ===
- Tariq Ramadan
- Guia Soncini
- Ritanna Armeni
- Giampaolo Pansa
- Andrea Romano
- Marco Ferrante
- Peppino Caldarola
- Maurizio Costanzo
- Filippo Facci
- Giuliano Da Empoli
- Lucetta Scaraffia
- Claudia Mancina
- Luciano Violante
- Alberto Mingardi
- Antonello Piroso
- Chicco Testa

=== Current columnists ===
- Iuri Maria Prado;
- Riccardo Annibali;
- Luca Longo;
- Luca Sablone;
- Michele Vitiello;
- Maria Elena Boschi;
- Biagio de Giovanni;
- Giovanni Minoli;
- Paolo Guzzanti;
- Fabrizio Cicchitto;
- Luigi Marattin;
- Renato Brunetta;
- Sabino Cassese;
- Pier Carlo Padoan;
- Marco Bentivogli;
- Teresa Bellanova;
- Aldo Torchiaro
- Giovanni Guzzetta
- Marco Zonetti
- Biagio Marzo
- Tiziana Maiolo
- Umberto Baccolo

== See also ==
- List of newspapers in Italy
