= Tom Newnham =

New Zealand anti-racism activist (1926–2010)

Thomas Oliver Newnham QSO (20 November 1926 – 15 December 2010) was a New Zealand political activist and educationalist. He was involved in several left wing causes: attacking institutional racism in New Zealand, and opposing the 1981 Springbok Tour and apartheid in general (both carried out in his role as Secretary of CARE).

He spoke Cantonese and Mandarin fluently after living in China and was heavily involved in helping Chinese immigrants in his later years. He wrote the book Dr Bethune's Angel: The Life of Kathleen Hall about the New Zealand missionary nurse who worked with the Canadian physician, Dr Norman Bethune, in China in the 1930s.

In the 1988 Queen's Birthday Honours, Newnham was appointed a Companion of the Queen's Service Order for community service.

Newnham died on 15 December 2010 from cancer, aged 84, at Elizabeth Knox Hospital, Epsom.

In 2023 he was posthumously bestowed with the Order of the Companions of O. R. Tambo.

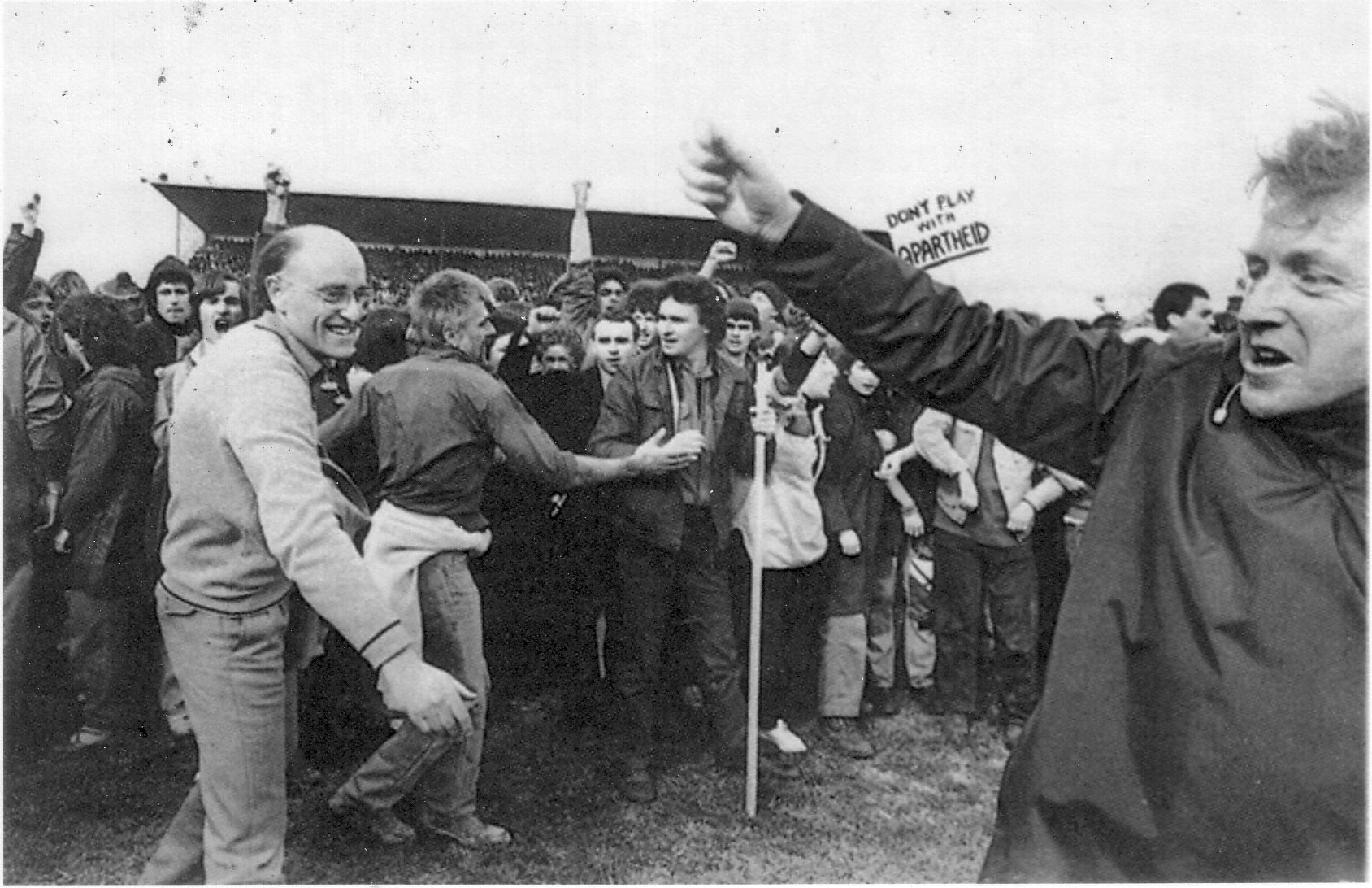
1981 protest against Springboks in Hamilton (New Zealand), right Tom Newnham

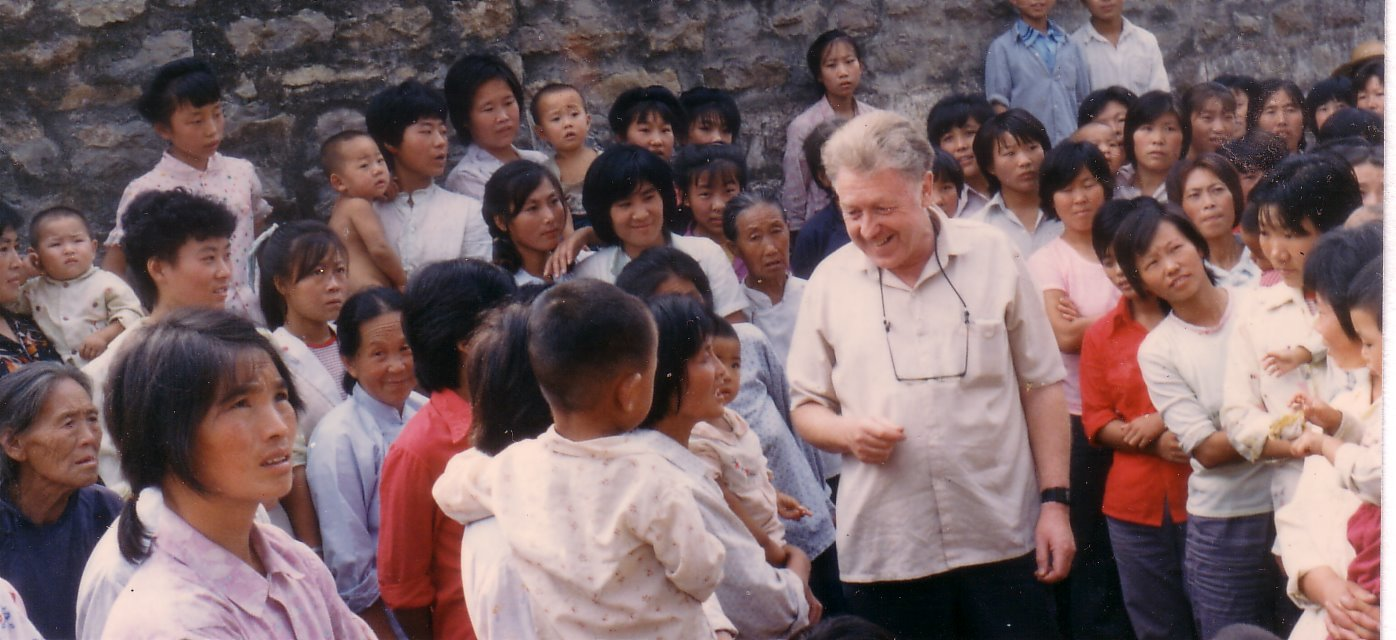
1989 Tom Newnham at Kathleen Hall's village China

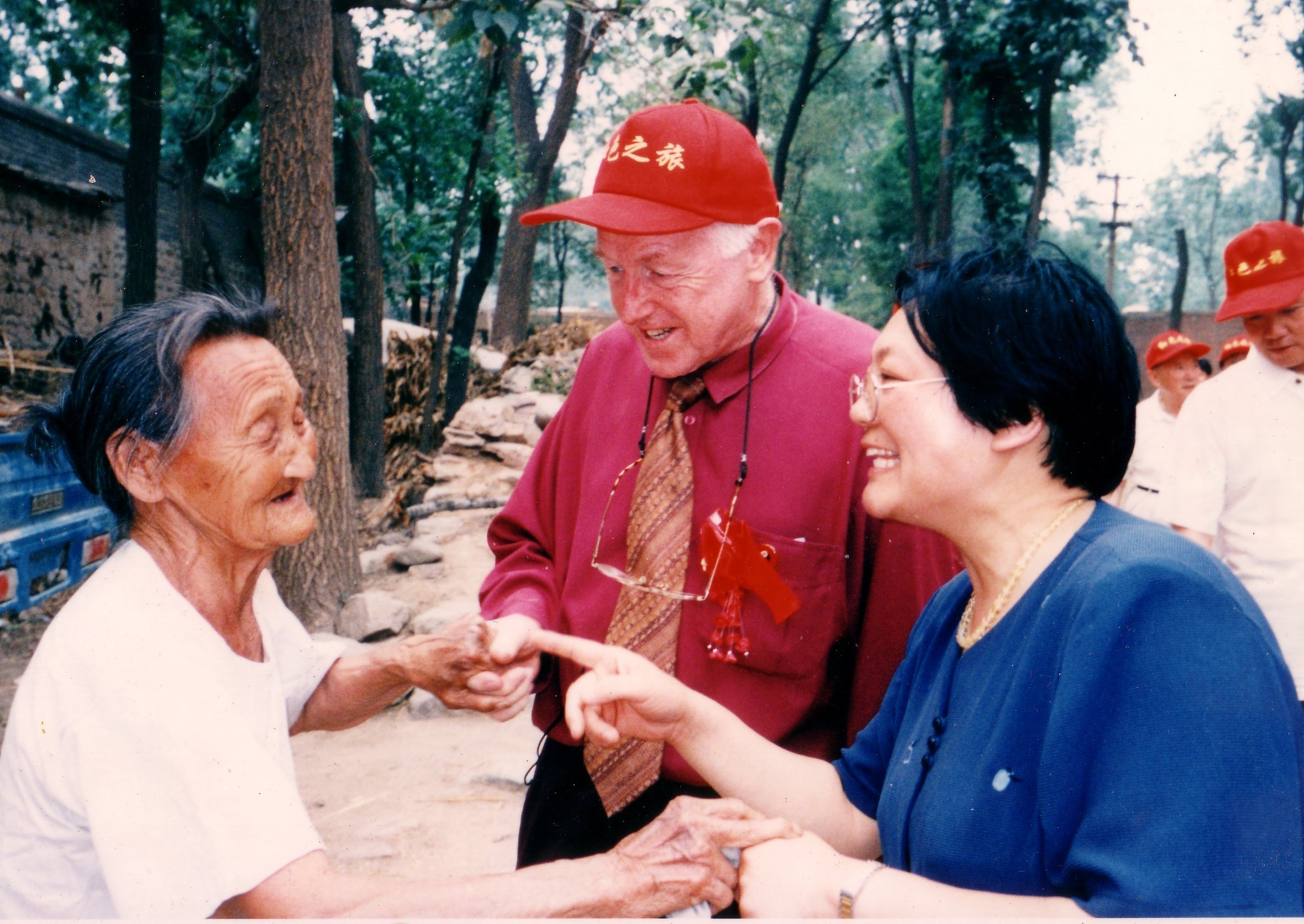
2000 Tom Newnham at Kathleen Hall commemoration in Baoding, China

== Books by Tom Newnham ==
- Newnham, Tom (2004). Dr Bethune's Angel: The Life of Kathleen Hall. Foreign Languages Press. ISBN 7-119-03538-X.
- By batons and barbed wire. Graphic Publications, 1983. ISBN 978-0-473-00112-4
- Dr. Bethune's Angel: The Life of Kathleen Hall. Foreign Languages Press, Beijing, 2004. ISBN 978-7-119-03538-3
- Dr. Bethune's Angel: The Life of Kathleen Hall. Graphic Publications, Auckland, 2002. ISBN 0-9597819-9-4
- He Ming Qing: Kathleen Hall. New World Press, 1992. ISBN 978-0-9597819-3-9
- New Zealand Women in China. Graphic Publications, 1995. ISBN 0-473-03005-5
- Apartheid is not a game: the inside story of New Zealand's struggle against apartheid sport. Graphic Publications, 1975
- An ABC of Racial Sport : what New Zealand sporting visits to South Africa really mean . Citizens Association for Racial Equality, 1969.
- Libel action against Prime Minister in Supreme Court, Auckland, 4–15 July 1977. Citizens Association for Racial Equality, 1977.
- Letter to Mr. Holyoake about the proposed All Black tour of South Africa and Rhodesia. Citizens Association for Racial Equality, 1969.
- The term "honorary white". Citizens Association for Racial Equality, 1969.
- Some Questions for Mr Dalgety. T. O. Newnham, 1978.
- Sione comes to New Zealand : a Samoan migrant's story Anthony Haas, Sue Kedgley, Tom Newnham. Whitcombe & Tombs, 1972. ISBN 0-7233-0326-6
- Interesting times: a Kiwi chronicle Graphic Publications, 2003 ISBN 9780473099893.
- Three Chinese Communues. Graphic Educational Publications, 1967.
- Three Chinese Communues. Rev. ed. Whitcoulls, 1975. ISBN 0-7233-0438-6
- Lake village in Cambodia. Longmans, 1965.
- Teak Logging in Thailand. Graphic Educational Publications, 1965.
- A Village in China. Longmans, 1967.
- Asia: the monsoon lands.3rd ed. Whitcombe and Tombs, 1973. ISBN 0-7233-0145-X
- India Builds Industry. Graphic Publications, 1966.
- A South Indian Village. Longmans, 1965.
- Revision Map Notebooks. Graphic Educational Publications, 1960–1961.
- The Middle Ages. Graphic Educational Publications, 1968.
- Rewi: The Story of Rewi Alley. Graphic Publications, 1997. ISBN 978-0-473-04694-1
- Hands and Minds Together : Rewi Alley's gung ho school. Tom Newnham and Deng Bangzhen. Graphic Publications, 1988. ISBN 0-9597819-1-9
- Fifty Years of Friendship : a short history of the NZ China Friendship Society. Graphic Publications, 2002. ISBN 0-9597819-8-6
- 1840–1990: A Long White Cloud: 19 Maori and Non-Maori Authors. Graphic Publications, 2000. ISBN 978-0-9597819-5-3
- Peace Squadron: The Sharp Edge of Nuclear Protest in New Zealand. Graphic Publications, 1985. ISBN 978-0-9597819-0-8
- French Polynesia, a paradise? : French colonialism and nuclear testing in the South Pacific. Campaign for Nuclear Disarmament, 1973.
- Shandan on the Old Silk Road. Graphic Publications, 2001. ISBN 978-0-9597819-7-7
- A Walk around My Fathers. Graphic Publications, 2000. ISBN 978-0-9597819-5-3
- A Cry of Treason. Dunmore Press, 1978. ISBN 0-908564-21-X
- This Family Robinson. Graphic Publication, 1993. ISBN 0-473-02058-0
- 10 Years of C.A.R.E.. by Keith Sorrenson, Tom Newnham and J. de Bres. Citizens Association for Racial Equality, 1974.
- 25 Years of C.A.R.E.. Citizens Association for Racial Equality, 1989.
- The Kiwi Who Walked on Water. Graphic Publications Ltd & the Garret Press, 1985.

== See also ==
- Politics of New Zealand
