= Helen Sword =

Literary scholar in New Zealand

Helen Sword FRSNZ

Academic background
- Education: Princeton University
- Thesis: Engendering inspiration: Visionary strategies in Rilke, Lawrence, and H.D. (1991)
- Doctoral advisor: Ralph Freedman; Sandra Gilbert

Helen Claire Sword FRSNZ is a New Zealand academic, specialising in modernist poetry and academic writing, and is an emeritus professor at the University of Auckland. She was elected as a Fellow of the Royal Society Te Apārangi in 2023.

== Academic career ==
Sword grew up in southern California. She gained an MA at Indiana University in 1986. After completing a PhD at Princeton University on comparative literature in 1991, Sword taught for ten years in the English department of Indiana University Bloomington. She moved to the University of Auckland in 2001, rising to full professor.

Sword has published several books on academic writing. When Sword's 2017 book Air & Light & Time & Space: How Successful Academics Write, Professor Inger Mewburn, said "Helen Sword is, hands down, one of the best writers on academic writing working today. The difference between Sword and other people working the writing advice patch is that she uses an interesting range of research approaches to inform her work. A new book from Sword is a nerdishly exciting moment for research educators like me and always an automatic buy."

In 2023 Sword was elected a Fellow of the Royal Society Te Apārangi. The society described Sword as "a world-leading expert on academic writing across the disciplines. As an international authority on modernist poetry, she has published books and articles that have expanded our understanding of the contradictory cultural and aesthetic forces at work in the poetry of twentieth-century authors including Yeats, Eliot, Lawrence, H.D. and Rilke. ... Her ground-breaking scholarship on academic writing has been praised by her peers for its rigorous evidence base and its skilful integration of theory and practice."

== Family ==
Sword is married to Richard Sorrenson and Keith Sorrenson is thus her father-in-law.

== Selected works ==
- Sword, Helen (1992). "Leda and the Modernists". PMLA. 107 (2): 305–318. doi:10.2307/462642. JSTOR 462642.
- Helen Sword (2016). "'Write every day!': a mantra dismantled". International Journal for Academic Development. 21 (4): 312–322. doi:10.1080/1360144x.2016.1210153. Wikidata Q117189884.
- Helen Sword; Marion Blumenstein; Kwan, Alistair Marcus; Louisa Shen; Evija Trofimova (2018). "Seven Ways of Looking at a Data Set". Qualitative Inquiry. 24 (7): 499–508. doi:10.1177/1077800417729847. Wikidata Q117189883.
- Helen Sword; Evija Trofimova; Madeleine Ballard (2018). "Frustrated academic writers". Higher Education Research and Development. 37 (4): 852–867. doi:10.1080/07294360.2018.1441811. Wikidata Q117189881.
- H. Sword; P. Sorrenson; M. Ballard (2019). "BASE pleasures: the behavioural, artisanal, social and emotional dimensions of academic writing". Studies in Higher Education. 45 (12): 2481–2496. doi:10.1080/03075079.2019.1616170. Wikidata Q117189878.
- Helen Sword (2009). "Writing higher education differently: a manifesto on style". Studies in Higher Education. 34 (3): 319–336. doi:10.1080/03075070802597101. Wikidata Q113482534.
- Helen Sword (2019), Snowflakes, Splinters, and Cobblestones: Metaphors for Writing, pp. 39–55, doi:10.1007/978-981-13-6114-2_4, Wikidata Q117189879 in Innovations in Narrative and Metaphor, editors Sandy Farquhar, Esther Fitzpatrick. Springer Singapore, https://doi.org/10.1007/978-981-13-6114-2
- Helen Sword (2012), Stylish Academic Writing, OL 16126833W, Wikidata Q134718035
