= Order of the Companions of O. R. Tambo =

South African award

- Badge (c. 2002)

Awarded by President of South Africa
- Type: National Order
- Status: Currently constituted
- Grades: Supreme Companion; Grand Companion; Companion

Statistics
- First induction: 10 December 2002
- Total inductees: 110
- Ribbon bar of the Order

The Order of the Companions of O. R. Tambo is a South African honour. It was instituted on 6 December 2002, and is granted by the President of South Africa to foreign citizens who have promoted South African interests and aspirations through co-operation, solidarity, and support.

The order is named after the late Oliver Tambo, who was the African National Congress's president-in-exile for many years.

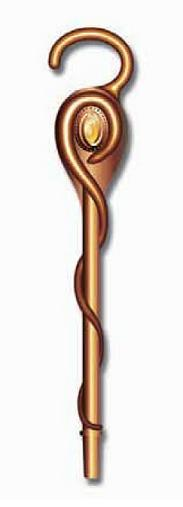
Walking stick awarded with Order

== Current classes ==
The three classes of appointment to the Order are, in descending order of precedence:

- Supreme Companion of OR Tambo in gold, for heads of state and, in special cases, heads of government (SCOT)
- Grand Companion of OR Tambo in silver, for heads of government, ministers of state, supreme court judges, presidents of legislatures, secretaries of state, ambassadors, commanders-in-chief (GCOT)
- Companion of OR Tambo in bronze, for legislators, envoys, senior military officers (COT)

== Symbolism ==
The badge of the order is oval, and depicts a symbol similar to that of the Taijitu between two arrowheads, framed by two mole snakes. The symbol represents the meeting of diverse spiritual energies, and the snakes represent solidarity and support. The South African coat of arms is displayed on the reverse.

The ribbon is white, with recurring grey symbols down the centre. All three classes are worn around the neck.

Recipients are also presented with a carved wooden walking stick, which has a serpent wound around the shaft and a spoon-shaped head displaying the badge of the order and the national arms. The walking stick symbolises support and solidarity, and a commitment to stand by the recipient in return.

== Recipients ==
Name	Grade	Awarded
(Sweden) Olof Palme (posthumous)	SCOT	10 December 2002
(Zambia) Kenneth David Kaunda	SCOT	10 December 2002
(India) Mahatma Gandhi (posthumous)	SCOT	10 December 2002
(Mozambique) Eduardo Chivambo Mondlane	SCOT	16 June 2004
(Angola) Agostinho Neto	SCOT	16 June 2004
(Ghana) Kwame Nkrumah	SCOT	16 June 2004
(Tanzania) Julius Nyerere	SCOT	16 June 2004
(Guinea-Bissau) Amílcar Cabral	SCOT	16 June 2004
(Tanzania) Salim Ahmed Salim	SCOT	16 June 2004
(Ghana) Kofi Annan	SCOT	16 June 2004
(Chile) Salvador Allende (posthumous)	SCOT	16 June 2004
(Finland) Martti Ahtisaari	SCOT	16 June 2004
(Jamaica) Michael Manley	SCOT	16 June 2004
(United States) Martin Luther King Jr.	SCOT	16 June 2004
(Democratic Republic of the Congo) Patrice Lumumba	SCOT	16 June 2004
(Algeria) Ahmed Ben Bella	SCOT	16 June 2004
(Sweden) Ernst Michanek	GCOT	16 June 2004
(India) Romesh Chandra	GCOT	16 June 2004
(United Kingdom) Barbara Castle	GCOT	16 June 2004
(Norway) Reiulf Steen	GCOT	16 June 2004
(Norway) Thorvald Stoltenberg	GCOT	16 June 2004
(United States) Maxine Waters	GCOT	16 June 2004
(Russia) Vasily Grigoryevich Solodovnikov	GCOT	16 June 2004
(United Kingdom) Robert Hughes	GCOT	16 June 2004
(Netherlands) Boudewijn Sjollema	GCOT	16 June 2004
(Switzerland) FIFA	SCOT	29 October 2004
(Sweden) Lennart Johansson	SCOT	29 October 2004
(New Zealand) Trevor Richards	SCOT	29 October 2004
(Guinea) Ahmed Sékou Touré	SCOT	29 October 2004
(Egypt) Gamal Abdel Nasser	SCOT	29 October 2004
(Guyana) Dr. Cheddi Jagan	SCOT	26 April 2005
(Indonesia) Ahmed Sukarno	SCOT	26 April 2005
(Guinea) Diallo Telli	SCOT	26 April 2005
(Botswana) Motsamai Keyecwe Mpho	GCOT	26 April 2005
(India) Jawaharlal Nehru (posthumous)	GCOT	26 April 2005
(Russia) Vladimir Gennadyevich Shubin	GCOT	26 April 2005
(Indonesia) Sheikh Yusuf	SCOT	27 September 2005
(Mali) Modibo Keita	SCOT	20 April 2006
(Botswana) Seretse Khama	SCOT	20 April 2006
(Eswatini) King Sobhuza II	SCOT	20 April 2006
(Lesotho) King Moshoeshoe II	SCOT	20 April 2006
(Greece) Sotiris Mousouris	GCOT	20 April 2006
(United Kingdom) Anthony Sampson	GCOT	20 April 2006
(Lesotho) Chief Joseph Leabua Jonathan	SCOT	24 April 2007
(Trinidad and Tobago) Dr. Eric Eustace Williams	SCOT	24 April 2007
(Guyana) Shridath Ramphal	SCOT	24 April 2007
(Kenya) Dr. Ali Al'amin Mazrui	GCOT	24 April 2007
(Botswana) Michael Kitso Dingake	GCOT	24 April 2007
(United Kingdom) Canon John Collins	GCOT	24 April 2007
(United States) Harry Belafonte	GCOT	24 April 2007
(Eswatini) Mandlenkosi Aloysius Isaac Zwane	COT	24 April 2007
(Palestine) Salman El-Herfi	COT	24 April 2007
(Nigeria) Chief Emeka Anyaoku	SCOT	22 April 2008
(India) Vengalil Krishnan Krishna Menon (posthumous)	GCOT	22 April 2008
(Cricket West Indies) Philip Potter	GCOT	22 April 2008
(Sweden) Per Wästberg	GCOT	22 April 2008
(United States) Ron Dellums	GCOT	22 April 2008
(United States) Harry Belafonte	GCOT	22 April 2008
(United States) Jerry Dunfey	GCOT	22 April 2008
(United States) Linda Biehl	COT	22 April 2008
(Cuba) Fidel Alejandro Castro Ruz	SCOT	27 March 2009
(Germany) Christian Krause	GCOT	27 March 2009
(Japan) Sadako Ogata	GCOT	27 March 2009
(Mozambique) Marcelino dos Santos	GCOT	27 March 2009
(Sweden) Bengt Säve-Söderbergh	GCOT	27 March 2009
(Namibia) Andimba Toivo ya Toivo	GCOT	27 March 2009
(South Africa) Jennifer Davis	COT	27 March 2009
(Tanzania) Anna Abdallah	GCOT	2 December 2009
(United States) Rev. William Cullen Wilcox	GCOT	2 December 2009
(United States) Ida Belle Wilcox	GCOT	2 December 2009
(United Kingdom) Elizabeth II	SCOT	3 March 2010
(Angola) José Eduardo dos Santos	SCOT	27 April 2010
(Switzerland) Joseph Blatter	SCOT	27 April 2010
(Belgium) Jacques Rogge	GCOT	27 April 2010
(Cameroon) Issa Hayatou	GCOT	27 April 2010
(United States) Herbert Kaiser	GCOT	27 April 2010
(United States) Joy Kaiser	GCOT	27 April 2010
(South Africa) Vernon Berrangé	GCOT	27 April 2010
(United States) George Houser	GCOT	27 April 2010
(Brazil) Luiz Inácio Lula da Silva	SCOT	27 April 2011
(Belgium) Hélène Pastoors	GCOT	27 April 2011
(Russia) Viacheslav Shiryaev	GCOT	27 April 2011
(United States) Edward M. Kennedy	SCOT	27 April 2012
(Russia) Prof. Apollon B Davidson	GCOT	27 April 2012
(United States) Randall Robinson	GCOT	27 April 2012
(Guyana) Linden Forbes Sampson Burnham	SCOT	27 April 2013
(Jamaica) Percival Noel James Patterson	SCOT	27 April 2013
(India) Enuga Sreenivasulu Reddy	GCOT	27 April 2013
(United States) Rev. Jesse Louis Jackson	GCOT	27 April 2013
(Egypt) Dina Forti	COT	27 April 2013
(Italy) Giuseppe Soncini	COT	27 April 2013
(United Kingdom) Lord Attenborough	GCOT	27 April 2014
(United Kingdom) Prof. Gwendolen Margaret Carter	GCOT	27 April 2014
(Guinea) Jeanne-Martin Cissé	GCOT	27 April 2014
(United Kingdom) Jerry David Dammers	GCOT	27 April 2014
(United States) Danny Glover	GCOT	27 April 2014
(United States) Quincy Delight Jones	GCOT	27 April 2014
(United States) Thomas Karis	GCOT	27 April 2014
(United Kingdom) Lord Kinnock	GCOT	27 April 2014
(Egypt) Alexander Moumbaris	GCOT	27 April 2014
(Angola) Ruth Neto	GCOT	27 April 2014
(United States) Alfre Woodard	GCOT	27 April 2014
(Canada) Brian Mulroney	SCOT	27 April 2015
(Tanzania) Hashim Mbita	SCOT	27 April 2015
(Australia) Gareth Evans	GCOT	27 April 2015
(United Kingdom) Lord Hain	GCOT	27 April 2015
(Russia) Vladimir Kazimirov	GCOT	27 April 2015
(United States) Gay McDougall	GCOT	27 April 2015
(Denmark) Lars Nordbo	GCOT	27 April 2015
(Russia) Andrey Urnov	GCOT	27 April 2015
(Malaysia) Dr. Lim Kok Wing	GCOT	27 April 2015
(Namibia) Sam Nujoma	SCOT	27 April 2018
(United Kingdom) Walter Khotso Makhulu	GCOT	25 April 2019
(Madagascar) Didier Ratsiraka	GCOT	25 April 2019
(United States) Tracy Chapman	GCOT	1 May 2023
(United Kingdom) Christabel Gurney	GCOT	1 May 2023
(New Zealand) Thomas Oliver Newnham (Posthumous)	GCOT	1 May 2023
(Jamaica) Peter Tosh (Posthumous)	GCOT	1 May 2023
(Germany) Ruth Weiss	GCOT	1 May 2023
(Netherlands) Huub Bammens	GCOT	23 April 2024
(United States) Donna Katzens	GCOT	23 April 2024
(Canada) Ken Luckhard	GCOT	23 April 2024
(United Kingdom) Nicholas Stadlen (Posthumous)	GCOT	23 April 2024
(Netherlands) Fulco Van Aurich	GCOT	23 April 2024
(Canada) Brenda Wall	GCOT	23 April 2024
(United States) Teresa Clarke	GCOT	14 May 2026
(Netherlands) Pierre Magnee	GCOT	14 May 2026
(Mozambique) Antonio da Silva Gomes Cordeiro (Posthumous)	GCOT	14 May 2026
(Mali) Chérif Keïta	GCOT	14 May 2026
(Netherlands) Naomi Kleinfeld	GCOT	14 May 2026

== Refusals ==
On 28 January 2008, New Zealand anti-apartheid activist John Minto created a controversy over his letter to former South African President Thabo Mbeki after being nominated for the award, saying that he would refuse, on principle, to accept any award from the ANC.

== See also ==
- South African civil honours
