= CARE (New Zealand) =

The Citizens' Association for Racial Equality (CARE) was a New Zealand organisation that fought against racism towards minority groups in New Zealand. It was founded in 1964 and wound up in 1986.

During the 1960s, CARE attacked policies such as the common de facto policy of banks not to employ Māori and compulsory pregnancy test for recent immigrants from Samoa. CARE became particularly famous in New Zealand through its vocal opposition to South African apartheid, particularly via organising resistance to any links with South Africa during the apartheid era. CARE was a leading participant in nationwide protests against the 1981 Springbok Tour.

In the 1970s, CARE protested against the dawn raids and succeeded in convincing the crew of a British cruise ship to refuse to sail with Tongan deportees on board.

CARE's long term secretary was Tom Newnham, and Mary Barton was one of their founders. Keith Sorrenson was the group's president from 1971 to 1973.
