= Jonathan Steele (journalist) =

British journalist

Jonathan Steele (born 15 February 1941) is a British journalist and the author of several books on international affairs.

== Early life ==
Steele was educated at King's College, Cambridge (BA) and Yale University (MA). He took part as a volunteer in the Mississippi Freedom Summer (1964) helping enable black American voter registration, and participated in the second abortive march from Selma to Montgomery in 1965.

== Journalism ==
He joined The Guardian as a reporter on return to the UK in September 1965, and has reported from many countries. He was Washington Bureau Chief for The Guardian from 1975 to 1979, Moscow Bureau Chief from 1988 to 1994, Foreign News Editor between 1979 and 1982 and Chief Foreign Correspondent for The Guardian between 1982 and 1988 during which he reported on the El Salvador civil war and events in Nicaragua as well as the US invasion of Grenada in 1983.

Following his return to London in 1994 after six years in Moscow, he covered the Kosovo War in Kosovo in 1998 and 1999 and the fall of Slobodan Milošević in 2000. As Senior Foreign Correspondent, he covered numerous stories in the Middle East after 2001. He covered the US/UK invasion of Iraq in 2003 and was regularly on assignment in Baghdad for the next three years. This resulted in January 2008 in his book Defeat: Why America and Britain Lost Iraq which was published by I.B. Tauris in the UK and Counterpoint in the US. He reported on the 2006 Israel–Hezbollah War in July/August 2006. He covered the protests and subsequent war in Syria after 2011, making numerous trips to Damascus.

Steele has reported regularly from Afghanistan beginning with his first visit to Kabul in 1981 during the Soviet occupation. He covered the Taliban take-over of the Afghan capital in 1996 as well as their collapse in 2001. His book, Ghosts of Afghanistan: the Haunted Battleground analyses thirty years of Afghan history (London: Portobello Books, 2011, and San Francisco: Counterpoint, 2011). In between foreign assignments, he worked as a columnist for The Guardian on international affairs. He was a member of The Guardian team which analysed WikiLeaks publications of the US Afghanistan War Logs, Iraq War documents leak and United States diplomatic cables leak.

Steele is a frequent broadcaster on the BBC and an occasional contributor to the London Review of Books and The New York Review of Books. From March 2014 he worked for three years as chief reporter of the website Middle East Eye. In early 2012, he wrote that Assad is a popular leader citing an opinion poll in which 55% of those polled said they wanted him to remain as Syria's leader, although he also commented it was worrying for the Assad government that half of those approving his government wanted free elections in the near future. In The Guardian in September 2018, Steele called for the anti-Assad rebels in the Syrian Civil War to surrender.

== Books ==
=== The South African Connection: Western Investment in Apartheid (1972) ===
(With Ruth First and Christabel Gurney)

Steele and his co-authors, who included Ruth First, a well-known South African journalist and activist who was later assassinated by a letter bomb sent by agents of the South African government, tackled the controversy over the role and effect of foreign capital in the apartheid economy. Did it accelerate 'modernisation', raise African living standards and help to liberalise the apartheid system from within? Or did it prop up and strengthen a regime of injustice and exploitation?

The book contains detailed analysis of the chronically low rates of wages paid by leading British companies and their South African affiliates to African workers. It showed that the gap between average wages paid to white and black workers was widening, and that although the colour bar which blocked Africans from taking skilled jobs reserved for whites was floating upwards, companies paid an African less for doing the same work which had been done by a white. In other words, the shortages of skilled labour which created opportunities for Africans to be promoted into senior roles did not reduce racial inequalities but merely lowered the companies' wage bill.

Steele and his co-authors exposed how deeply British capital was embedded in the South African mining sector as well as banking, insurance, chemicals and car assembly. They dissected the reform campaign being pushed by many liberals in Britain, including by his employer, the Guardian, for British companies to pay higher wages to their African workers in South Africa. While this would improve labour rates and conditions for the affected few, they argued, it should not be seen as a step which would undermine apartheid. Instead, they called for disinvestment by foreign capital and the imposition of sanctions on companies which continued to operate in the apartheid system. The book had wide resonance in the international sanctions movement which was gathering pace at the United Nations and in Western countries and which culminated in the collapse of minority rule and apartheid a decade and a half later.

=== Socialism with a German Face (1977) ===
Steele's book Socialism with a German Face (US: Inside East Germany, 1977) is a study of the Soviet Bloc country. Melvin Croan, in Commentary, described the "historical chapters" as "basically sound." Steele wrote that "its overall social and economic system is a presentable model of the kind of authoritarian welfare states which Eastern European nations have now become" and the country "as much a part of the socialist tradition" as the other states then in existence. The former leader of East Germany, Walter Ulbricht, he described as "the most successful German statesman since Bismarck."

Timothy Garton Ash, in a 2006 Guardian article wrote: "My question then was, and still is: presentable to whom? Presentable to the outside visitor, engaged on his or her reportorial and ideological journey, but free to leave whenever he or she wishes? Or presentable to the people who actually live there? I think the East Germans answered that question in 1989." In a July 2007 letter to The New York Review of Books, Steele defended himself from an accusation of being "myopic" (made by Garton Ash in a NYRB article) in his writings about the former East Germany. Peter Hitchens a few years later, while praising Steele as one of "the more honest Western Leftists" and a "first-rate foreign correspondent", described the book as a "sympathetic" account.

John Sherman Cooper, the first US ambassador to the GDR, described the book as "marked by fairness and objectivity". Strobe Talbott, diplomatic correspondent of Time magazine, said it was written with "skill and insight":

The chapters on the postwar period make clear that the founders of the East German party and state were not, as they are so often depicted, merely Stalinist agents bent upon imposing Soviet-style socialism. Steele's account of the 1953 uprising — the precursor of later revolts in Hungary, Czechoslovakia and Poland — goes a long way to clearing up an episode that has been badly obscured by propagandists on both sides.

=== Superpowers in Collision: The New Cold War (1982) ===
(With Noam Chomsky and John Gittings)

The book elaborated on three talks given at seminars organised in London by Peggy Duff, general secretary of the International Confederation for Disarmament and Peace. In his talk Steele explained why an end had come to the period of what was called "detente" in East-West relations which brought the Soviet and US leaders together at four summit meetings between 1972 and 1974. Each side recognised that there was "parity" in the Soviet and US nuclear arsenals, making victory impossible because of the prospect of mutual assured destruction (MAD). War thereby became unthinkable.

The stalemate broke down in the mid-1970s. Steele cited two reasons. One was ambiguity over the area that detente was meant to cover. Was the so-called Third World (Africa, Asia, Latin America) included? The Kremlin hoped it was. They wanted a joint role alongside the US on the lines of the co-chairmanships of the conference on Indochina in 1962 and on the Middle East in 1973. But Moscow also continued to support national liberation movements for independence in countries allied to the West. The US would not accept this.

The second problem with detente, Steele argued, was the imbalance in ideological costs. They were greater on the American side. For the Kremlin the achievement of reaching parity with the leading capitalist state was in line with the Soviet concept of historical progress. Americans, by contrast, took it as a threatening notion. Taught that their country was "the last best hope of mankind", they found it hard to accept that their major ideological enemy had become immune to attack. American hawks hankered for superiority. They won out in the policy debates in Washington, which helped to propel Ronald Reagan into the US presidency in the 1980 election on a platform of resuming an arms race with the Soviet Union.

=== The Limits of Soviet Power (1983) ===
(Published originally in hardback in the UK as World Power and in the US as Soviet Power.)

In this book Steele developed the arguments of Superpowers in Collision. Debunking Reagan's taunt that the Soviet Union was an evil Empire, he described it as a society with a tired regime and a host of foreign and domestic problems. It was bitter about the failure of detente, challenged by a crisis of loyalty in Eastern Europe, and virtually excluded from the Middle East. Its dispute with China was ever more deeply entrenched and its image in the Third World had been tarnished by the foolish invasion of Afghanistan.

In Europe it was a conservative, status quo power, more concerned by the difficulties of holding on to its postwar conquests in Eastern Europe than by plans to advance further westwards. Moscow gained more from trading with capitalist countries than from subsiding the economically inefficient East. In Asia its primary challenge was not external but internal — how to develop the vast resources of Siberia. In the Third World it sought to enlarge its influence through the soft power of diplomatic, economic and political means.

The book argued that it was better to judge the Soviet Union's potential by analysing the historical record of its international activity rather than by examining Communist party ideology or Kremlin speeches. The fundamental paradox of the era of Leonid Brezhnev's leadership in the Kremlin was that while Soviet military power increased in the 1960s and 1970s, its political power declined in every region of the world.

Jonathan Dimbleby described the book as a "judicious assessment of the Soviet threat, argued with self-effacing expertise. It will be indispensable to those who believe that there should be more to East-West relations than the dangerous trade in crass insults which passes for superpower diplomacy at the moment." David Holloway in The Washington Post called the book "lively and readable. [The author's] attempt to set Soviet military power in the broader context of foreign policy is particularly valuable, for too often the political utility of that power is accepted uncritically, both in the West and in the Soviet Union."

=== Eternal Russia: Yeltsin, Gorbachev and the Mirage of Democracy (1994) ===
Based on eyewitness reporting and interviews with Gorbachev and other senior Soviet officials during his time as the Guardian's Moscow bureau chief between 1988 and 1994, Steele analyses what went wrong with perestroika and the chaotic switch to a market economy in Russia. It places the volatile and hesitant reform process within the broad sweep of Russian history, highlighting the difficulties facing those attempting to build democracy and the rule of law on the foundations of traditional Russian authoritarianism.

Perry Anderson described it as "a tour de force of contemporary history. No other account of the failure of Gorbachev's perestroika and the prospects for Yeltsin's rule comes close to it". Robert V. Daniels said the book "utterly demolishes the rationalisations of both the Russian and American governments about Yeltsin's 'democratic dictatorship'. This is the best history I know of on the whole Gorbachev-Yeltsin period to date." Abraham Brumberg, editor of Problems of Communism, called it a work of "well-read open-minded journalism, with an eye for the lively vignette as much as the broader historical processes, above all resistant to the maladies to which correspondents in Russia so often succumb —flippant cynicism or mindless romanticism".

=== Defeat: Losing Iraq and the Future of the Middle East (2008) ===
The book challenged the common argument that Bush and Blair failed in Iraq because of a lack of planning for the post-Saddam period plus a series of blunders, such as the dissolution of the Iraq army and the banning of the Baath party. The assumption, widely shared by politicians and the media in Washington and London, is that with better pre-invasion preparation and more efficient post-war management the USA and the UK could have won the peace as impressively as they won the opening phase of the military campaign by toppling Saddam Hussein in three weeks from the start of the invasion. Steele's thesis is more fundamental. He argued that the occupation was flawed from the start. Even if the US-led occupation had been more sensitive, generous and intelligent, it could not have succeeded. It created resentment, suspicion, anger and resistance since all occupations, however benign they pretend or try to be, are inherently humiliating. Iraqis had a long collective memory of imperial intrusion and a deep sense of anti-Western patriotism which was re-awakened by the 2003 invasion. The Washington Post said of the book: "It asks the Iraq question in a new and interesting way: Could we have ever gotten this right?" Noam Chomsky said it was "written with penetrating intelligence and deep knowledge, drawing on courageous reporting from Iraq and the region".

=== Ghosts of Afghanistan: The Haunted Battleground (2011) ===
The Economist described the book as being a "fine modern history" with Steele's multiple visits to the country over many years meaning he "is well placed to compare the end of the Soviet era and the present 'transition', the favoured common euphemism for foreign withdrawal." Rodric Braithwaite, in The Observer, comments that Steele "writes with increasing despair about the failing efforts of the United States and its allies to build a viable Afghan state out of the physical, institutional and human rubble left behind by three decades of civil war and foreign intervention."

== Prizes and awards ==
In 2006, Steele won a Martha Gellhorn Prize for Journalism Special Award in honour of his career contributions. He was named International Reporter of the Year in the British Press Awards in 1981 and again in 1991. He won the London Press Club's Scoop of the Year Award in 1991 for being the only English-language reporter to reach the villa in the Crimea where Mikhail Gorbachev was held captive and interview the Soviet president during the brief coup in August that year. In 1998, Steele won Amnesty International's foreign reporting award for his coverage of ethnic cleansing in Kosovo. In 1998 he also won the James Cameron Award.

== Personal life ==
Steele and his wife Ruth live in London. The couple have two children.

== Works ==
- The South African Connection: Western Investment in Apartheid (with Ruth First and Christabel Gurney), 1972
- Socialism with a German Face, Jonathan Cape, 1977 (UK); Inside East Germany: The State that Came in from the Cold, Urizen Books, 1977 (USA)
- Superpowers in Collision: The New Cold War (with Noam Chomsky and John Gittings), 1983
- Andropov in Power (with Eric Abraham), 1983
- Soviet Power: The Kremlin's Foreign Policy from Brezhnev to Andropov, 1983
- Eternal Russia; Yeltsin, Gorbachev and the Mirage of Democracy, 1994
- Defeat: Why America and Britain Lost Iraq, 2008.
- Ghosts of Afghanistan: The Haunted Battleground, Portobello (UK)/Counterpoint (US) 2011.
