= Ruth Weiss (writer) =

German-born South African writer (1924–2025)

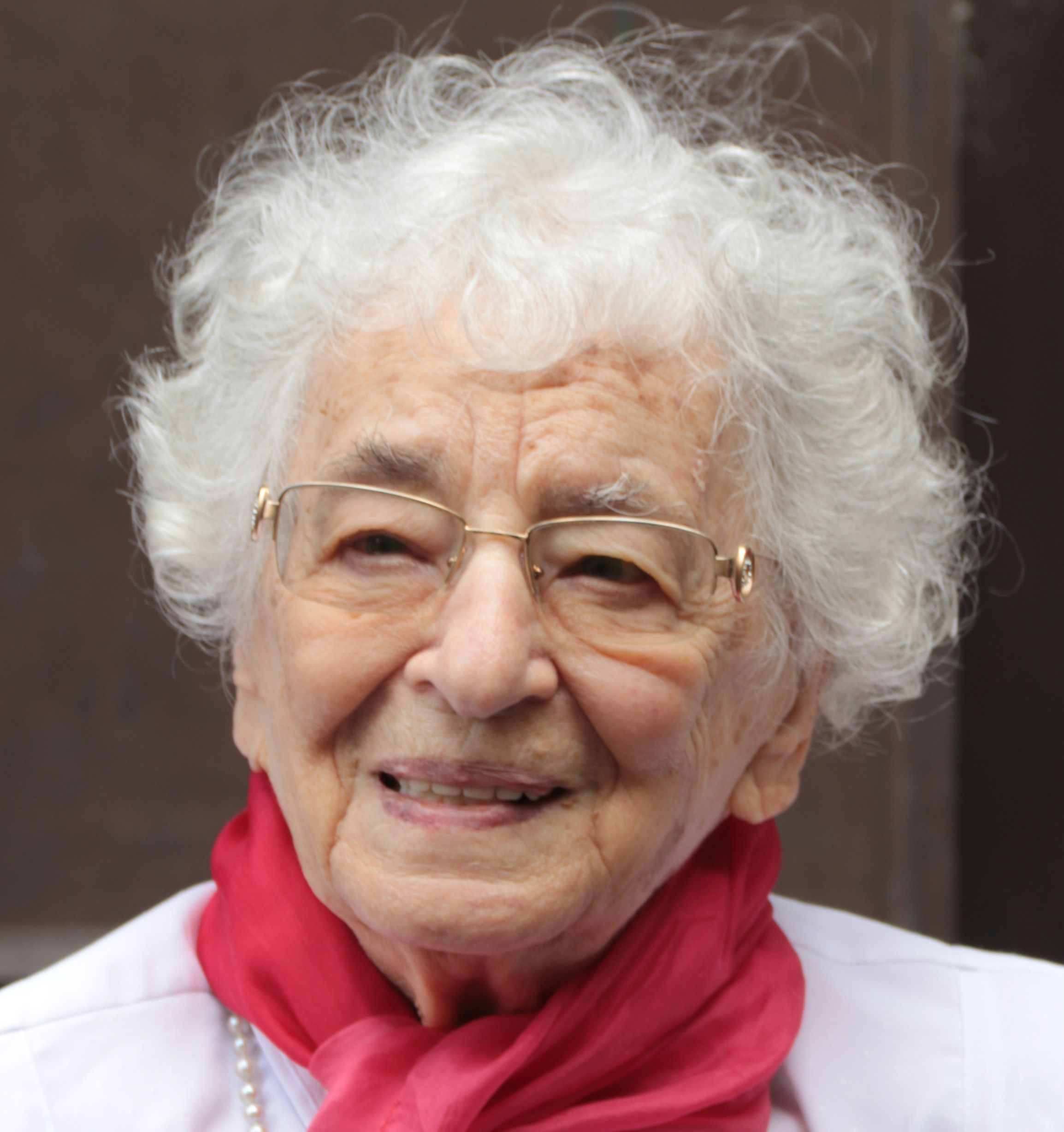
- Weiss in 2022
- Born: Ruth Löwenthal; 26 July 1924; Fürth, Bavaria, Germany
- Died: 5 September 2025 (aged 101); Aalborg, Denmark
- Occupations: Journalist; writer
- Spouse: Hans Leopold Weiss (m. 1953; div. 1962)
- Children: 1
- Writing career
- Notable awards: Order of the Companions of O. R. Tambo; Order of Merit of the Federal Republic of Germany

Ruth Weiss (née Löwenthal; 26 July 1924 – 5 September 2025) was a German-born South African journalist and writer who focused on anti-racism in all its forms. She grew up as a Jew in Germany, emigrating to South Africa in 1936 where she became a self-taught journalist alongside her future husband. She was a well-known anti-apartheid journalist and activist, exiled by South Africa and Rhodesia for her writings. She worked in London for The Guardian, in Germany for Deutsche Welle, and in Zimbabwe, writing in both English and German. She finally lived in Denmark. Her historical fiction books for young adults and her memoirs reflect her battles against racism in Germany and Africa.

== Biography ==
=== Early life in Germany ===
Ruth Löwenthal was born in Fürth on 26 July 1924 to a Jewish family. She grew up in a village near Nürnberg, with a sister, Margot. Her grandfather, an orthodox Jew, was an important role model for her. She went to school from 1930. In 1933, when the Nazis came to power, the family moved back to Fürth where she attended a Jewish school. Her father, who worked in a toy factory, lost his job and realised that there was no future for the family in Germany. He emigrated to South Africa where he had relatives. The family followed in 1936.

=== South Africa ===
Her parents, now named Loewenthal, ran a small grocery store in Johannesburg. She attended school, first in a poor district where she realised that Jews were not welcome in South Africa either. She achieved the Abitur in 1939, while her sister had to finish school early because the family could afford fees only for one child. Too poor to study at a university, she first worked in a law firm from 1941 to 1944. She joined an independent Jewish cultural youth group, where she met Hans Leopold Weiss who became her husband in 1953. He was a German-born journalist, who with other group members had been members of the Communist Party of Germany. From 1944, she worked in Weiss's bookstore and, from 1944 to 1960, became an expert on African economics by working her way up to company secretary at the South Africa Mining and General Assurance Company, one of the few females in the upper reaches of the then-male dominated insurance industry. From 1954 she taught herself journalism by assisting her husband, an African correspondent for several German newspapers, and published under his name, reporting to European media on apartheid and the growing resistance against it. Her work involved travel to several African countries. She became known as a financial and political journalist openly sympathetic to independence movements in Zambia and Zimbabwe. She was business editor of Newscheck, and then joined the Financial Mail (FM). In 1963, after publishing an interview with Nelson Mandela when he was in hiding, she was exiled from South Africa, permitted to return from Germany only to say good-bye to her parents.

=== International work ===
Weiss worked in exile in London. In 1966, she became FM's bureau chief in Salisbury, Southern Rhodesia (now Harare, Zimbabwe), but was declared persona non grata by the white regime because of her critical reporting and "sanction busting" stories. She moved to The Guardian in London, returning in 1970 to Africa as business editor of the Times of Zambia and correspondent of the Zambian Financial Times. From Lusaka she moved to Cologne in 1975 as an editor in the Africa-English department of Deutsche Welle, often as the only woman at work. She returned to freelance work in London in 1978. After covering the 1979 Lancaster House talks on Zimbabwe, she was invited to Zimbabwe, now independent, to train economic journalists and was co-founder of the Southern African Economist. From 1987 to 1991, she worked on the staff of the Zimbabwe Institute of Southern Africa (ZISA), which facilitated secret meetings of white and black South Africans, ahead of official talks, which began in 1990 and led to the dismantling of apartheid.

=== Personal life and death ===
Weiss at her garden in Lüdinghausen in 2005

Weiss was married to Hans Leopold Weiss from 1953 to 1962. In 1963 she had a son, Sascha, with another man, and raised him as a single mother.

Starting in 1992, she lived on the Isle of Wight for a decade, where she began writing novels. She moved to Lüdinghausen, Germany, in 2002, where she had friends, and continued writing, publishing her memoirs and books for young adults. In 2015 she moved to Aalborg, Denmark, where her son lived. Weiss turned 100 on 26 July 2024.

Asked about her home by Deutsche Welle in an interview in 2014, she said: "I have never completely left Africa. (...) My home is where people walk in stride with me, where people don't just focus on their careers, but care about other people. I'm glad that so many people have taken that seriously, that's my home."

Weiss died in Aalborg on 5 September 2025, at the age of 101.

== Awards, honours and legacy ==
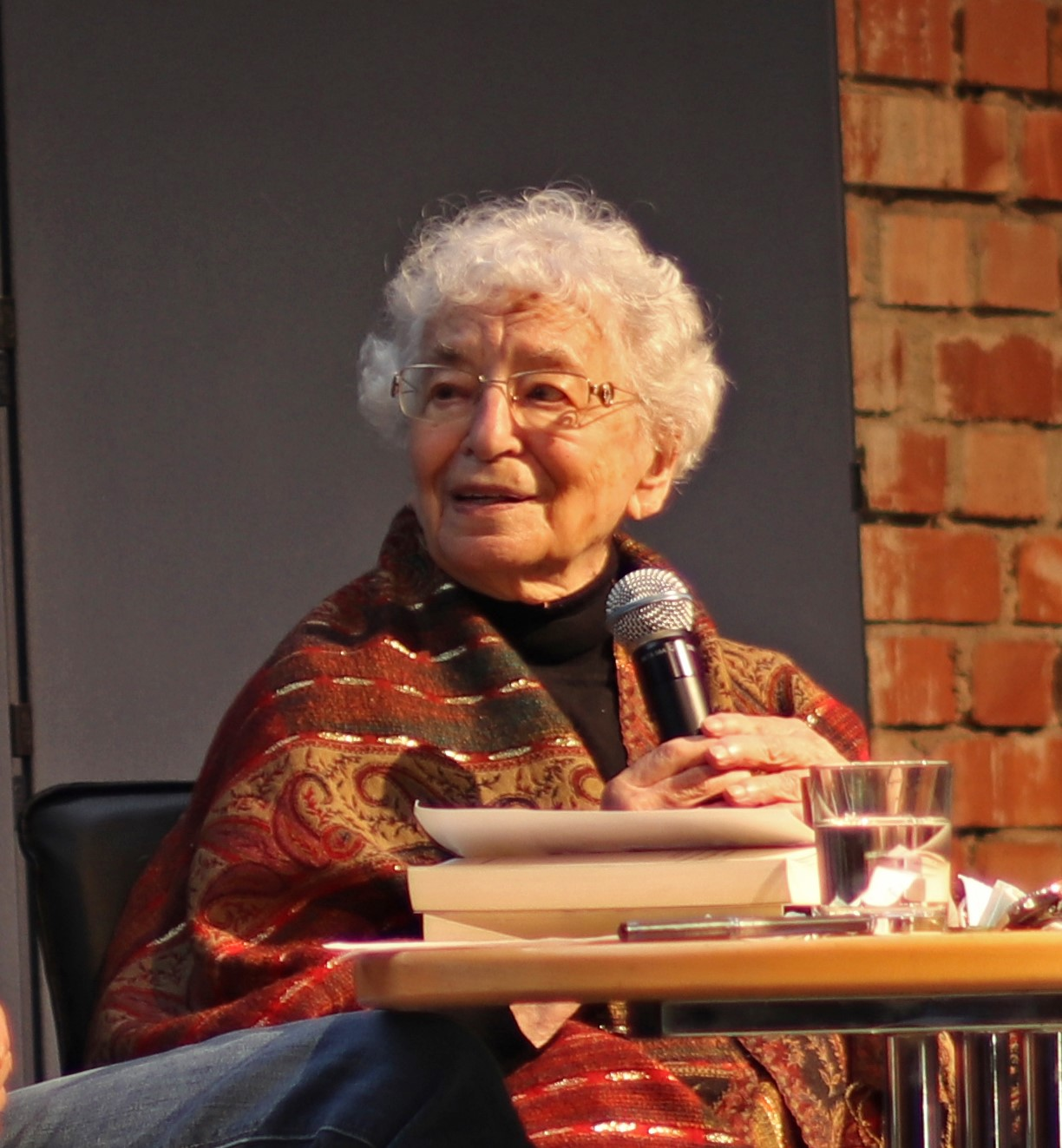
Weiss in 2020

In 2005, Weiss was one of 1,000 women nominated for the Nobel Peace Prize by the 1,000 PeaceWomen initiative, based on her long history of opposition to apartheid resulting in her exile, for her lifelong work with German and Swiss anti-apartheid groups, her work in German schools on reconciliation between herself as a Jew forced to flee Germany and the post-Nazi German generations, and finally for her work with ZISA, which helped to bring white and black South Africans together prior to the dismantling of apartheid.

In 2010, a girls' high school in Aschaffenburg, Bavaria, was named after her (Ruth-Weiss-Realschule), and a library containing her works was established. Nadine Gordimer wrote a letter that was read during the ceremony, and the eulogy was given by Denis Goldberg, the only white on the trial with Nelson Mandela who, like the others, was sentenced to life imprisonment. In 2014, she was awarded the Order of Merit of the Federal Republic of Germany. In 2023, Weiss was bestowed with the Order of the Companions of O. R. Tambo. In April 2024, she received the Grand Cross of the German Order of Merit.

== Selected works ==
- Feresia (A day in the life of a child in Zimbabwe) was listed as one of the best 20 German children's books of 1988.
- Sascha und die neun alten Männer, a children's book, tells the adventure of a little Russian boy, who stumbles into a small house next to an old synagogue. Here he meets nine old men who have moved together in the hope that one day a Jew will visit the deserted quarter, so that they are a "minyan" – a congregation of ten Jews – to enable them to hold a synagogue service. Sascha finds the tenth man. The book was listed by the Catholic Best Children Books in 1997 in Germany.
- My Sister Sara tells of a four-year-old, blonde German war orphan patriotically adopted in 1948 by an Afrikaner parliamentarian who sympathises with the Nazis. The family, a good family, falls in love with the child. When her papers arrive from the orphanage six months later, the family discovers that Sara's roots are tainted. Hate rips through the family. The rejected child only has two options: depression or rebellion. The story was selected as compulsory matriculation reading in the German state of Baden-Württemberg in 2007.
- Mitzi's Wedding tells of a young German aristocrat who defies convention to become a musician in the heady days of Berlin in the 1920s/1930s. Charming and exuberant, she braves the mesmerising ascent of Nazi Germany to marry one of the three men who love her. She is betrayed by the second who cowers before the voice of popular racism and, finally, continents away, is revenged by the third. This novel considers how racism impacts the intertwined, families of victims and oppressors and the everyday voices of silence and dissent.
- Judenweg is the fictional account of a young Jew turned robber out of anger and defiance against 17th century anti-Jewish laws which forced thousands into homelessness, wandering along unmarked paths, unable to remain anywhere for longer than two days. The aimless walk from Fürth to Frankfurt took two weeks.
- Blutsteine (Bloodstones) is a thriller set in Africa in the 90s, when diamonds were used in three-corner barter deals for weapons and drugs.
- Zimbabwe and the New Elite examines the dashed hopes of Robert Mugabe's first independence decade where power was transferred from whites to a new black elite who all too readily abandoned the foundations of their revolution.
- Sir Garfield Todd and the Making of Zimbabwe, one of her non-fiction works, is a biography of Sir Garfield Todd, the unlikely New Zealand missionary who became the Prime Minister of Rhodesia but was sidelined because of his liberal policies of racial equality. Another compares the Irish and African freedom movements. The role of women in revolution is reflected in The Women of Zimbabwe, where Weiss often cites the women's narratives directly. One woman's description of avoiding a massacre by hiding in a pit latrine for four days is particularly heart wrenching.
- Wege im harten Gras (Paths Through Tough Grass), her autobiography, documents her life through the late 1980s and has an prologue written by her friend, Nobel Prize-winner and fellow South African writer, Nadine Gordimer.

== Archive ==
Weiss built up a collection of articles, manuscripts, biographical documents, professional correspondence, research material, photographs and audio recordings that she eventually entrusted to the archive of the Basler Afrika Bibliographien (Basel Africa Bibliographic Library, BAB) in Basel. The collection consists of approximately eight meters of documents, 300 photographs and 180 audio tapes and cassettes. The parts of the collection received by BAB before November 2011 are catalogued and can be accessed through a finding aid.

The photographs can be accessed via the BAB archive catalogue. The Ruth Weiss Sound Archive contains recordings of interviews made by Weiss, mostly in the 1970s and 1980s, with prominent actors from politics and economics but also ordinary people. The collection further contains recordings of press conferences, political events, independence celebrations, live music and readings. With the support of Memoriav, the Swiss National Sound Archives digitalised the recordings which are now preserved as WAV and MP3 files. BAB published a finding aid for the Ruth Weiss Sound Archive that can be accessed online and in print.

== Books ==
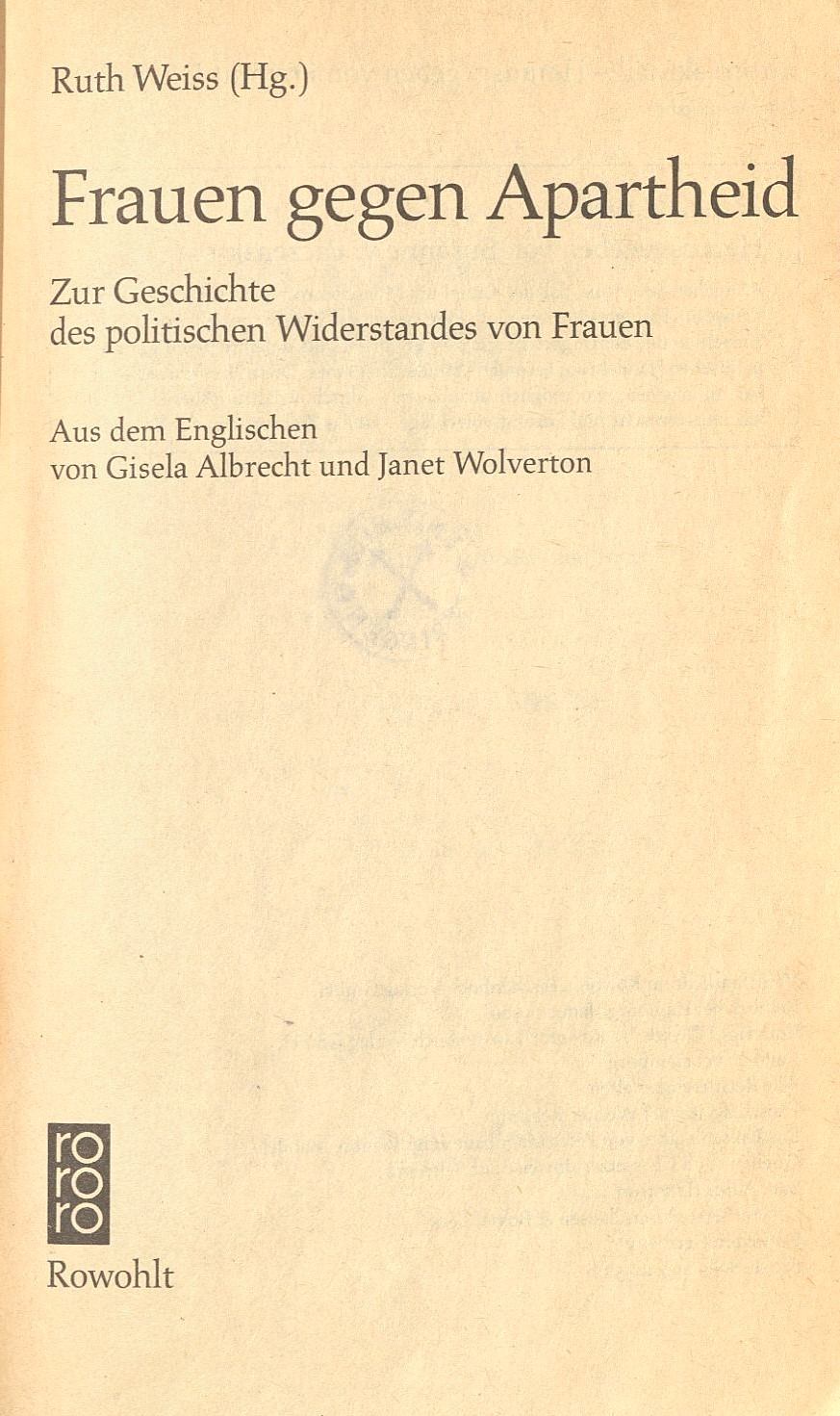
Title page of Frauen gegen Apartheid (1980)

=== In English ===
- Strategic Highways of Africa (1978)
- Women of Zimbabwe (1983, Kesho Publishers)
- Zimbabwe and the New Elite (British Academic Press, 1994)
- Sir Garfield Todd and the Making of Zimbabwe (with Jane Parpart) (1998)
- Peace in their Time; the peace process in Northern Ireland and southern Africa (London, 2000)

=== In German ===
Books by Weiss in German include:

- Lied ohne Musik, autobiography. (Laetare Verlag, 1980)
- Frauen gegen Apartheid (Women Against Apartheid), ed. (Rowohlt, 1980)
- Die Frauen von Zimbabwe (Frauenbuchverlag, 1983)
- Afrika den Europäern, with H. Meyer – about the 1884 Berlin Conference. (Peter Hammer Verlag, 1984)
- Wir sind alle Südafrikaner, a brief history of South Africa. (EB Verlag, 1986)
- Mandelas zornige Erben (Revolt of the Township Youth), with Hannelore Oesterle (Peter Hammer, 1986)
- Die Saat geht auf, about Zimbabwe's agriculture (Peter Hammer, 1987)
- Feresia, children's book with photos by Graham de Smidt about a day in the life of a child in Zimbabwe (Peter Hammer, 1988)
- Menschen werfen Schatten, profile of a rural project (Peter Hammer, 1989)
- Wege im harten Gras, autobiography, postscript by Nadine Gordimer (Peter Hammer, 1994)
- Sascha und die neun alten Männer, children's book (Peter Hammer, 1997)
- Geteiltes Land, profile of Southern Africa (EB Verlag, 1997)
- Reise nach Gaborone, short stories (Komzi Verlag, 1997)
- Nacht des Verrats, thriller (Horlemann Verlag, 2000)
- Meine Schwester Sara, novel set in the early apartheid years (Maro Verlag 2002, dtv 2004)
- Blutsteine, novel set in the diamond industry (Maro Verlag, 2003)
- Judenweg, historical novel set in the 17th century (Mosse Verlag, 2004)
- Die Nottaufe, historical novel, sequel to Judenweg (Mosse Verlag, 2006)
- Mitzis Hochzeit, novel – set in the 1920s and 1930s of turbulent Berlin. (Maro Verlag, 2007)
- Miss Moores Geburtstag, thriller (Trafo, 2008)
- Eingeladen war ich nicht, autobiographical stories (Trafo, 2008)
- Memorys Tagebuch, novel set in Mugabe's Zimbabwe (Trafo, 2009)
- Deborahs Lied, historical novel set in 13th-century England (Trafo, 2010)
- Miss Moore's Hausparty, thriller (Trafo, 2010)
- Die Löws. Eine jüdische Familiensaga in Deutschland series of novels (Verlag Edition AV, Lich, later Bodenburg, 2017–2020)
  - 1: Der Judenweg. Verlag Edition AV, Bodenburg 2020
  - 2: Die Nottaufe. Verlag Edition AV, Bodenburg 2020
  - 3: Der Aufstieg. Verlag Edition AV, Lich 2017
  - 4: Der Niedergang. Verlag Edition AV, Lich 2017
  - 5: Schwere Prüfung. Verlag Edition AV, Lich 2018
  - 6: Nachspiel. Verlag Edition AV, Bodenburg 2019
  - 7: Die Mischpoche. Nachwort. Verlag Edition AV, Bodenburg 2020
- Der spitze Hut. Verlag Edition AV, Bodenburg 2021

== In German media ==
=== Television ===
- South Africa Belongs to Us, German TV, 1979, on South African women in which Winnie Mandela gave her first TV interview.
- ZDF Zeugen des Jahrhunderts series (two one-hour features) 1994

=== Radio ===
- Europas blasses Judenkind, March 2011, Deutschlandfunk (repeated on WDR)
