= Kathleen Anne Baird Hall =

New Zealand nurse and Anglican missionary

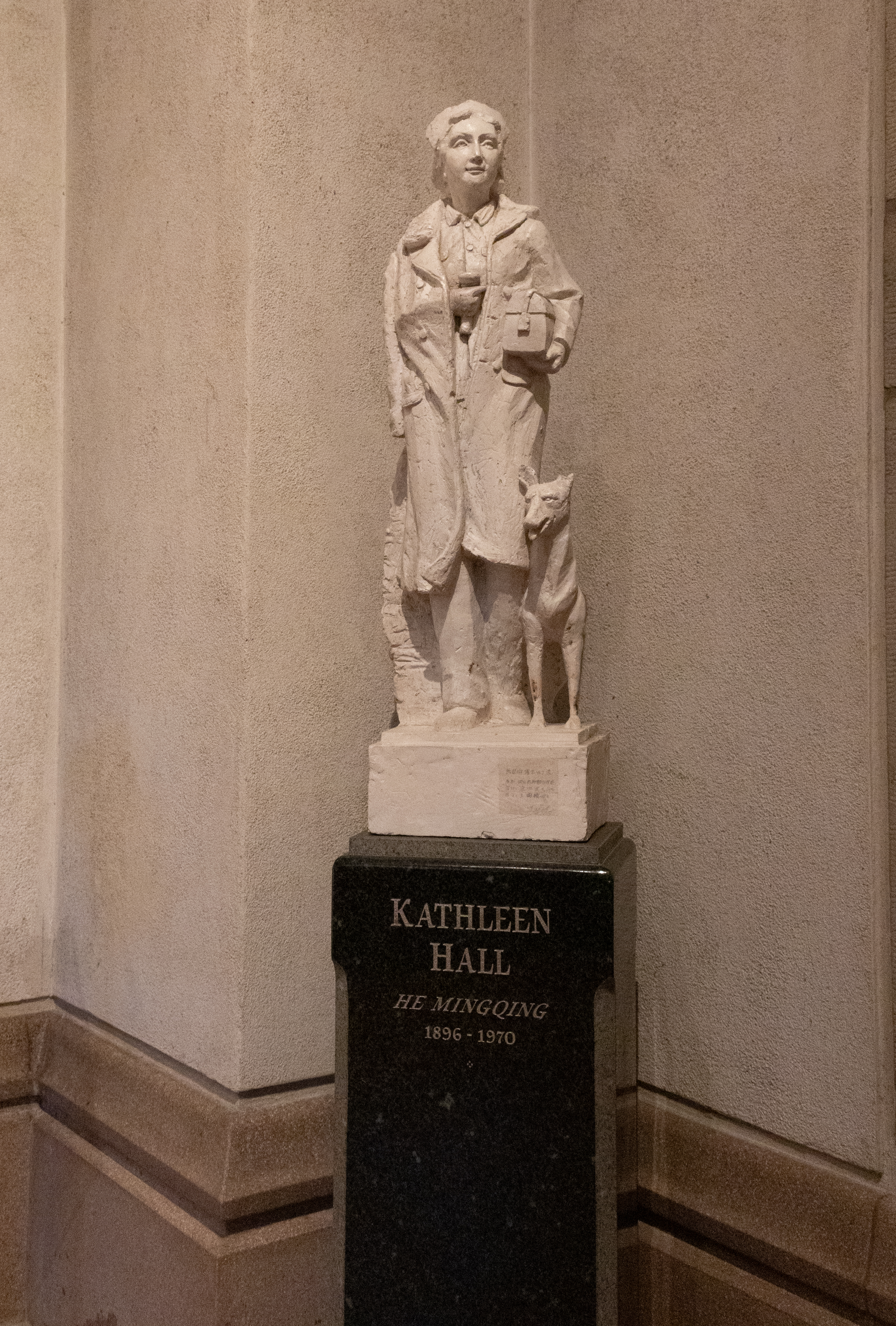
- A statue of Hall inside the Marsden Chapel, Holy Trinity Cathedral, Auckland.
- Born: 4 October 1896; Napier, Hawke's Bay, New Zealand
- Died: 3 April 1970 (aged 73)

Kathleen Anne Baird Hall (Chinese name: He Mingqing - 何明清; 4 October 1896 – 3 April 1970) was a New Zealand nurse and Anglican missionary who served in China.

== Early life ==
Hall was born in Napier, Hawke's Bay, New Zealand on 4 October 1896. She trained at Auckland Hospital and St Helens in Christchurch. In 1922 she was accepted by the Anglican society for the Propagation of the Gospel for missionary work in China.

== Mission in China ==
In 1923, she arrived in Beijing (at that time called 'Beiping'). For several years she worked at the Peking Union Medical College, which was a well-funded hospital operated by protestant missionaries. She went through several years of language training and eventually was put in charge of a hospital in Datong.

In 1927, she was transferred to a hospital in Anguo, where she was placed in the hospital management. Anguo was the first western hospital in a rural part of northern China. She ran two classes for training nurses in Anguo and trained more than 60 nurses.

In 1934, she returned to New Zealand briefly to do some studies before returning again to China.

In 1934, she went to Shijiazhuang to deliver western medicinal services to those in poor living conditions. She used her own money and wrote to her family in New Zealand asking for money.

== Role in World War II ==
Japanese soldiers began the war in July 1937 following the Marco Polo Bridge Incident. The first major battle in the war was fought in the area around Beijing (see Battle of Beiping–Tianjin). During this period, Kathleen tended to the medical needs of wounded Chinese. She also met Chinese general Lü Zhengcao who himself was wounded and tended by Kathleen at her hospital in Anguo. She treated many wounded Chinese soldiers at her hospital in Anguo. During this time, according to local Chinese sources, she actively assisted the Chinese resistance against the Japanese invaders.

She frequently used her identity as a missionary as a cover to purchase medical supplies that were used by Chinese that were resisting the Japanese invasion. She would purchase supplies in Beijing and then transfer them to rural areas in Hebei or Shanxi. She assisted Canadian doctor Norman Bethune, who was helping the Chinese communists in the Eighth Route Army, in this capacity, and formed a deep friendship with Dr. Bethune.

Beijing was occupied by the Japanese at the start of the war, but it also had more ample medical resources within the city than rural areas on the outside. Every time that she would travel to Beijing, she would take a list given to her by Dr. Bethune of various medical items that the communist soldiers needed. She would purchase these items in Beijing nominally in the name of the missionary hospital in Anguo. She would make this trip more than 30 times in a year. A small network of Chinese resistors assisted her with this.

A number of the people she trained at the missionary hospital in Anguo also went to join Dr. Bethune's medical team with the Eighth Army. She would sometimes sleep in churches and hide Chinese civilians or communist soldiers in the churches.

A story from an eyewitness named Gao Jingyun, recorded in 1989, even claimed that she used the Xuanwumen church to meet people heading to Chinese communist territory and helped transport bomb material for them.

I still remember in July, one Sunday morning, Song brought someone, later I learned that his name was Sun Lu, he was a student at Tsinghua university. Afterwards we went with him on a bus to enter the city, he brought us to a church. In the washroom, he introduced us to another person, he got us to select someone to go out and meet the guide. I was selected to go outside of that Xuanwumen church, and there I saw Kathleen Hall. I felt that she was very warm, honest and greatly willing to help the Chinese fight the Japanese. I told her about the thoughts of my friend and I, she asked some questions. Then she told me to set a time to come to Beiping to buy some medicine supplies for the liberated zone. I told my dorm mates, they felt that Kathleen's plan was too dangerous, to just head straight to Baoding. So one afternoon, the three of us went to find her, asking her if she had another method to reach the liberated zone. She thought a bit, she said that she was planning on heading back there soon, but that we could not travel with her. She told us to go on a train by ourselves to Ding county, then find a village named Gaomei, and wait for her there. She carefully explained how to bypass the Japanese-controlled rail paths, and how to get to Gaomei. She said in Gaomei at a particular area on a street, there was a small family inn, the owner's face had a red birthmark. 'You tell him, I made you stay at the inn to wait for me' she said, 'he will then let you stay there.' She said that she would meet us there, and then take us to the liberated zone. We agreed with her plan, but were very worried about the bomb-making materials. She said that it was too dangerous to carry these things, she was willing to do it for us. Therefore, that night we went to the church one more time, and we handed the things over to her. The next day we went out according to her words, and safely got to the little inn in Gaomei. We slept there two nights. On the third day, Ms. Hall appeared, telling us that she had brought 3 nurses from Beiping, and wanted to bring them to the hospital in Anguo. After she made arrangements for them, she would come back to look for us. After she came back again, she made us put on farmer's clothes, the Liberation Army said that we would only get past the Japanese lines by following her. Along the way we saw many people, they enthusiastically welcomed her, spoke with her, telling her where the Japanese forces were. The people treated her like they would treat a great person from their home, she was very familiar with the local area. Sometimes we had to keep our heads down moving forward, in irrigation ditches, canals, dry riverbeds crawling forward. Sometimes we had to lie down a long time, waiting for Japanese to pass. Without her guidance, we would never get anywhere. In the end we got to Songjiazhuang, but the contact person she mentioned was not found there. However, she still wrote an introduction letter to give to a department of the government of the liberated zone. It was at that time when the message was passed, someone said that the Japanese were currently closing in on the village. She quickly finished writing the letter, and sent us off to the mountain road. She said she still wanted to return to Anguo to meet with the three nurses. We got to the new headquarters of the zone, which had been moved because of a retreat from the Japanese forces at Songjiazhuang. Not long after we received a letter from Ms. Hall, saying she was still at Songjiazhuang. She said that our bags [containing the bomb-making materials] had reached the village and been placed in the church, but the Japanese destroyed the church and our bags were also destroyed. We felt very bad, not only because of our bags, but because we feared that maybe our bags had brought about the suspicion of the Japanese. Later we heard that Kathleen Hall returned to New Zealand. She was a great foreign friend who truly loved the Chinese people, enduring danger to do many things, and took people like me to the liberated zone.'

Another eyewitness named She Rong said

In 1938, I received a scholarship and got full employment at the school, in the women's college. The secretary of the college Bian Deh, a foreigner, was very close to me. In early 1939, she asked me what kind of work I wanted after graduation. At the time, I didn't understand her meaning, so my reply was very muddled. She then asked me again the question. At last, I told her that I wanted to join the armed forces of the people who were resisting the Japanese invaders. She told me that she had a friend who often went back and forth from the liberated zone, who could bring me there. At that time, I didn't give her a firm answer, but I said that I wanted to see that friend to learn more details. Kathleen Hall sent Lu Zhongyu to come to the school to see me, I asked him many things about the liberated zone. He told me that Kathleen Hall had set up a church and clinic in Quyang county, and that the partisan groups of Quyang had moved to Songjiazhuang. He had a good relationship with Kathleen Hall, and he also got Kathleen to bring people from Beijing to join them. I asked Mr. Lu what they needed the most, he answered "hospital medicines and educated people, like doctors, nurses and students." Ms. Hall often brought these things.

== Friendship with Norman Bethune ==
Norman Bethune, a Canadian communist and medical doctor had earlier volunteered with the Republican forces in the Spanish civil war, and arrived in China in January 1938 to assist the Chinese communists. He did not speak Chinese and so he relied upon interpreters to help him. In late 1938, he heard of Kathleen Hall and her work, and wanted to meet with her. He invited her to visit the Eighth army, and after she came and saw the problems they had with a lack of supplies or personnel, she began to work with them to set up the underground supply route of medical supplies and people from Beijing to the Eighth army. On one occasion she asked Dr. Bethune to come to Anguo to perform emergency surgery, and he took a bicycle and personally went there to do the surgery, for which she was very grateful.

She told Dr. Bethune that at the start of the war the Anglican church had told them that they could not join either side, or else they would be excommunicated. Dr. Bethune, an atheist, told her about his experiences in Spain and tried to convince her. In Spain, the nationalists under Franco had been openly supported by the preaching of high ranking authorities in the Catholic church, despite their mass murders of civilians and rebellion against the government. Kathleen decided to support the communists.

The two of them were very close friends. Kathleen raised some goats and they would drink goat milk with each other, or coffee, and shared many similar ideas. When Bethune died, he left the last of his money to Kathleen Hall.

== Buying medicine in the war ==
"In the past several months, the main medical supplies have largely been reliant upon Ms. Hall's help, she has spent about 15000 Yuan on medicine. These medicines should be enough for the Eighth army to go through the winter" - Norman Bethune .

Guo Qinglan, a nurse who worked in a hospital behind enemy lines wrote of her, "I think, only Kathleen Hall could have gotten me to the base...I was sitting with the patients in the first convoy, Kathleen Hall was wearing sunglasses, dressed up fully as a missionary, carefully and timely looking out for the things on the vehicle as well as our surroundings...the wooden and bamboo boxes were filled with medicines, underneath there was electric equipment and wireless radio, only on top it was covered with some tins of cookies" .

She would usually dress in clothes that made her deliberately look like a foreigner and missionary, in order to avoid Japanese suspicion of her activities.

She set up a string of underground stations for moving medical supplies to the Eighth army. She would move supplies from Beijing to Anguo, under the guise of using them at her hospital in Anguo and then move some of the supplies from Anguo to the resistance.

== Turn to Communism ==
The Anglican church was profoundly opposed to international communism and it had given her as well as other missionaries at the start of the war that they could not choose sides, or else they would be excommunicated.

When she had first come to China, she had little knowledge of the communists and she had once claimed that Communists were trouble-makers. But over time, her views changed. She met communist commander Nie Rongzhen and afterwards she claimed, "Communists have a mind that is open like the sea, only the communists will be able to change the face of China, because they have strict discipline, and they give a positive and friendly hope to the people of raising their standard of living" .

== Deportation from China ==
After the war had gone on for two years, and after less than a year since she first started helping Dr. Bethune, her activities raised the suspicions of the Japanese. The Japanese employed many collaborators among the Chinese and other occupied peoples, and they became aware of the true nature of what she was doing in China. They came and destroyed both her clinics as well as church. They issued a formal complaint to the British ambassador. Kathleen made a request to the Anglican communion to help her rebuild the church and clinics.

Not realizing that she was the direct target of what the Japanese had done to her clinics, since the newspapers had not reported anything about it, she went to Beijing once more to buy medical supplies and once she was in the city, she was arrested by the Japanese. Japan was still at peace with the British empire at the time, so they opted to deport her rather than execute her. She was deported to Hong Kong.

While in Hong Kong, she made the decision to resign from the Anglican missionaries and to join the Chinese Defense league, in order to prepare for a return to China. In October 1939, she and several others started a journey to go back to rejoin the communists in Shanxi, first travelling through Vietnam. When she reached Guiyang she heard of Dr. Bethune's death. She was greatly affected by this and mourned deeply.

When she finally reached Shijiazhuang, her health deteriorated. The communists moved her to Xi'an and eventually she was sent back to New Zealand.

== Return to China ==
She attempted to return to China in 1950, after the communist victory, but she was not allowed to enter the country at that time, due to a general ban on westerners and foreigners entering at the time of the Korean war.

In 1960, she was allowed entry and made a friendship visit to Tian'anmen square in Beijing, where she met with Zhou Enlai and saw a statue of Norman Bethune, which she cried in front of. She took a handful of dirt from next to the statue in her hand- the dirt had been a mixture of dirt from China and dirt from Canada.

== Legacy ==
She died in 1970. According to her wishes, her remains were returned to China.

On his deathbed, Norman Bethune wrote of her: 'Please convey my sincere thanks to Kathleen Hall, for all of her help'.

A book on her in Chinese was written by Ma Baoru, the former deputy director of tourism in Baoding city.

She is remembered in China as a hero and there are some statues of her. She was commemorated by the Tian Guang newspaper of the Roman Catholic Archdiocese of Beijing in 2017. She has a primary school named after her in Songjiazhuang.

She has often been cited as a figure of friendship between New Zealand and China. A book in English on her life was written by Tom Newnham entitled 'Dr. Bethune's Angel: The Life of Kathleen Hall'.
