= Christabel Gurney =

Activist and historian

Christabel Gurney, OBE is an activist and historian, who was involved in the Anti-Apartheid Movement. She joined the organisation in 1969, and was the editor of its journal Anti-Apartheid News from 1969 to 1980. Later, she was secretary of the Notting Hill Anti-Apartheid Group. She received an OBE "for political service, particularly to Human Rights" in the 2014 Birthday Honours. In 2023 she was bestowed with the Order of the Companions of O. R. Tambo.

== Publications ==
Books

- First, Ruth; Steele, Jonathan; Gurney, Christabel (1972). The South African connection: Western investment in Apartheid. London: Maurice Temple Smith. ISBN 978-0851170299.

Articles

- Gurney, Christabel (June 1999). "When the Boycott Began to Bite". History Today. 49 (6): 32–34.
- Gurney, Christabel (March 2000). "A Great Cause: The Origins of the Anti-Apartheid Movement, June 1959–March 1960". Journal of Southern African Studies. 26 (1): 123–144. doi:10.1080/030570700108414. JSTOR 2637553.
- Gurney, Christabel (June 2009). "The 1970s: The Anti-Apartheid Movement's Difficult Decade". Journal of Southern African Studies. 35 (2): 471–487. doi:10.1080/03057070902919991. JSTOR 40283243.
