= Keith Sorrenson =

New Zealand historian (1932–2025)

Maurice Peter Keith Sorrenson (16 January 1932 – 26 July 2025) was a New Zealand historian. He grew up in a rural part of the Bay of Plenty. With degrees from the University of Auckland and University of Oxford, he held initial employment with the Makerere University in Uganda, but soon returned to the University of Auckland for his remaining academic career. He was a member of the Waitangi Tribunal for 25 years.

Sorrenson treasured both his Ngāti Pūkenga and pākehā heritage. He was central to the reappraisal of colonial New Zealand history. Two of his books are included in Books of Mana: 180 Māori-Authored Books of Significance, which lists the 180 most significant works of Māori-authored non-fiction.

== Early life and education ==
Maurice Peter Keith Sorrenson was born on 16 January 1932 at Upper Papamoa. His parents were Robert John Sorrenson and Tui (née Asher). He treasured both his Ngāti Pūkenga and pākehā heritage. He received his education at Kaiate Falls Primary School and Tauranga District High School (now Tauranga Boys' College), from where he graduated as dux. He was captain of the school's 1st XV (i.e. the rugby union team that would represent the school in regional and national competitions). He retained a life-long passion for rugby.

Sorrenson was the first from his family to attend university and went to the University of Auckland from 1950 to 1955. He graduated with a Bachelor of Arts in 1953 and a Master of Arts in 1956. His master's thesis, The purchase of Maori lands, 1865–1892, was later called by historian Judith Binney as a "pioneering work without parallel". After initial employment at the University of Auckland, Sorrenson went to the University of Oxford (1959–62) and obtained a doctorate on African history.

== Career ==
Sorrenson started his working career as a research assistant (1955–1956) at the University of Auckland, followed by a period as junior lecturer (1957–1958). After he completed his doctorate at Oxford, he went as a research fellow to the East African Institute of Social Resources at Makerere University (1963–1964), where he advanced his interests in colonial and inter-racial history. He was attracted back to Auckland University through the offer of a lectureship in 1964. He progressed quickly through the academic ranks and was promoted to senior lecturer in 1965, associate professor in 1966, and professor in 1968. He held the chair of history from 1968 until his retirement in either 1995 or 1996 (sources differ). He was head of department for three periods: 1974–1976, 1979–1981, and 1985–1987. In 1996, he was made professor emeritus. He became a historical consultant to the Waitangi Tribunal in 1986 and contributed to 14 tribunal enquiries. He retired from the tribunal in 2010.

Outside of university, Sorrenson was president of CARE (Citizens' Association for Racial Equality) from 1971 to 1973. In 1972, he petioned prime minister Norman Kirk against a tour by the Sprinboks the following year, which was ultimately cancelled by the New Zealand government. Sorrenson joined protests against the 1981 Springboks tour of New Zealand.

He was a council member of the New Zealand Historic Places Trust (1973–1984). For some years, he sat on the New Zealand Geographic Board (1986–1993) In 1986, he worked for the Electoral Commission on parliamentary representation of Māori. He was associate editor of the New Zealand Journal of History from the beginning of the journal in 1967 until 1986, and co-editor with Judith Binney from April 1987 until October 1995.

Sorrenson, together with fellow historian Alan Ward, was central to the reappraisal of colonial New Zealand history. Sorrenson made lasting contributions both as a researcher and a lecturer. Binney noted at his retirement that his course "Waitangi: the Treaty and the Tribunal" was particularly attractive to students. He instilled in his students "a respect for knowledge, evidence and critical thinking".

A particular achievement was Sorrenson's trilogy that covered the 174 letters that the Māori statesmen and scholars Āpirana Ngata and Peter Buck. The Royal Society of New Zealand remarked: "Without the letters we would not have such ready access to the influential ideas that Ngata and Buck have bequeathed to us." Ward pointed out the underlying tribute from the families that Sorrenson was entrusted with the work and commented: "The care and integrity behind the three-volume work show that the trust was not misplaced."

In 2025, Books of Mana: 180 Māori-Authored Books of Significance was published, listing the 180 most significant works of Māori-authored non-fiction. Sorrenson published two of the books listed: Maori Origins and Migrations (1974) and Na To Hoa Aroha : From Your Dear Friend: The correspondence between Sir Apirana Ngata and Sir Peter Buck, 1925–50 (1986).

== Family and death ==
In 1956, Sorrenson married Judith Arena Nicholls, the daughter of John Owen Herbert and Ina Nicholls. They had two sons and one daughter. One of his sons is maried to the literary scholar Helen Sword. He died on at Auckland City Hospital at age 93.
