= Luca Longo =

Italian computer scientist

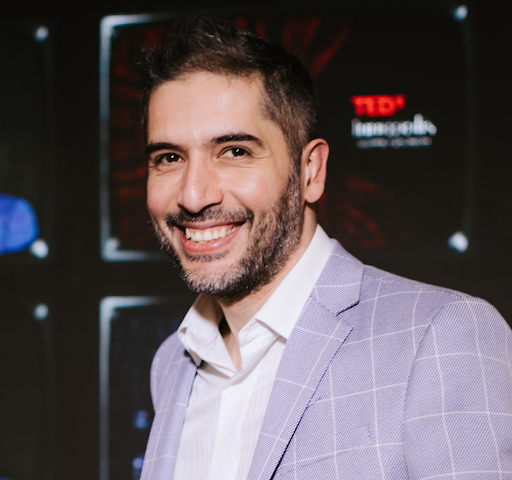
- Education: Trinity College Dublin; University of Insubria
- Occupation: Computer scientist
- Employer: University College Cork

Luca Longo is an Italian computer scientist specializing in Explainable artificial intelligence, Deep Learning and Argumentation theory with research in the areas of Human performance modeling and Neural Engineering. He conducts fundamental research on computational models of Cognitive Load and Brain–computer interface. He is a public speaker disseminating technical knowledge to the wider public and contributing to the non-profit organization TED (conference) "ideas worth spreading".

Longo is a professor at the University College Cork in Ireland and the founder and general chair of the World Conference on Explainable artificial intelligence, along with the founder of the first Centre of Explainable Artificial Intelligence in Ireland. He serves as editor of books and journals with Springer Publishing and Frontiers Media. He is currently leading the Artificial Intelligence and Cognitive Load research labs at the University College Cork aimed at expanding the boundaries of Artificial Intelligence and bridging the gap between machines and humans.

== Awards and honours ==
Prof. Longo is among the top 2% of the world's most influential scientists, appearing in Stanford University's rank of researchers from the Scopus database across all research areas, using the c-score. Luca is the recipient of the 2023 "AI Person of the Year" award, organised by AI Ireland, a non-profit organisation focused on promoting Artificial intelligence in Ireland. He is also the 2016 and 2021 winner of the Teaching Hero Award in Ireland by the National Forum for Teaching and Learning, inspiring students by creating motivating and stimulating learning environments that support the acquisition of skills and the formation of knowledge applicable in practical contexts through the mastering of the Community of inquiry in Higher education. Longo is also an educator, striving to empower Education with the use of technology and Artificial Intelligence. These distinctions have led to his conferral of the "Premio ASI Italiani nel mondo" award from it:Associazioni sportive sociali italiane in 2024. In 2025, his manifesto for Explainable artificial intelligence was awarded the best paper award of the year, in the Elsevier journal Information Fusion. His approach to doctoral supervision has led to a nomination for the award 'Outstanding Research Supervisor of the Year' (2021), widely recognised as the 'Oscars of higher education' organised by the Times Higher Education, one of the leading world magazines of higher education.

== Education ==
Longo is originally from Varese and a polymath who earned a doctorate in Artificial Intelligence and a doctorate in Neuroscience both at Trinity College Dublin. His academic journey started with a bachelor's and a master's degree in Computer Science from the University of Insubria. He also obtained a master in Health informatics and one in Statistics at Trinity College Dublin. Additionally, he earned two master's degree in Pedagogy, one in Scholarship of teaching and learning and one in Applied E-learning at the Technological University Dublin.

== External additional reliable independent sources ==
- Luca Longo publications indexed by Google Scholar
- Luca Longo at DBLP Bibliography Server
- ORCID 0000-0002-2718-5426
- Publications by Luca Longo at ResearchGate
- Luca Longo publications indexed by the Scopus bibliographic database. (subscription required)
