= Giuseppe Soncini =

Italian politician

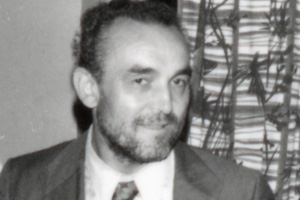
- Born: Giuseppe Soncini; April 26, 1926; Reggio Emilia
- Died: April 4, 1991 (aged 64); Parma
- Occupations: partisan and politician
- Known for: his work in promoting international solidarity and fight against apartheid

Giuseppe Soncini (born 1926 - died 1991) was an Italian politician. He was a member of the Italian Communist Party and a leading figure in the city government of Reggio Emilia in northern Italy. In this position he promoted links between Reggio Emilia and southern African countries, in particular anti-colonial and anti-apartheid movements. For this work he was posthumously given the Order of the Companions of O. R. Tambo award by the South African presidency.

== Early life ==
He got a diploma as a factory designer; then he began working for the municipality of Reggio Emilia. From 14 June 1944, he took part in the Italian Resistance against Fascism and Nazism; in the same period he joined the Partito Comunista Italiano (PCI).

At the end of the Second World War, he began working in the Officine Reggiane factory and, due to his organizational and managerial qualities, he was appointed Deputy Secretary of PCI Section Santa Croce “Reggiane-Officine Meccaniche Italiane” and member of the trade union inside the factory.

He led the struggle against the shutdown of the factory but this caused him some periods of detention. Nevertheless, he continued defense of workers’ rights. In fact, along those years he was news editor of the magazine “La voce operaia”, an insert of magazine “La Verità”.

== Political activities ==
=== The period of PCI ===
After the shutdown of Officine Reggiane, Soncini went to Rome, where he attended the Istituto di Studi Comunisti (better known as Scuola delle Frattocchie) and passed a test to become journalist. This allowed him to work in the Press and Propaganda Section of the Party.

In the late Fifties, he went to the USSR to attend a course about economic and political theories, while Nikita Khrushchev was leading the country. Here Soncini learned Russian language and got in touch with many students, some of them from Asian and African countries.

After the Russian experience, by 1960, Giuseppe Soncini managed the "Ufficio Studi Provinciale" of PCI of Reggio Emilia: during the first half of Sixties, he published some reports and articles on economic, working and social conditions of Reggio Emilia district.

=== The roles of Chairman of Reggio Emilia’s Hospital and of Deputy Mayor ===
In 1964, he served as a city councillor of Scandiano’s municipality; then in 1967, he served as board member of Hospital Santa Maria Nuova of Reggio Emilia. When the hospital became Ente Ospedaliero Provinciale, Giuseppe Soncini was appointed as chairman.

In 1970, Soncini became Chairman of Emilia Romagna's Associazione Regionale Ospedali (AROER): in this period he promoted the important transition from a mutualistic healthcare system to a universal one. Between 1972 and 1977, he was also FIARO’s vice chairman: during the first two years, he was involved in negotiations for the first National Labour Agreement (ANUL in Italian), that included rules on private practice and on full-time medical practitioners.

In 1975, he left as a chairman and was elected in the Council of Reggio Emilia municipality; then he was appointed Deputy Mayor on Human Resources, Statistics, Planning, Press and Public Relations Departments and kept this commitment also in 1976 whenUgo Benassi became Mayor. The same mayor entrusted him as Deputy Mayor on International Relationships in 1977, and, in 1980 as Deputy Mayor on Finance Department. His presence in the city council was confirmed both in 1980 and 1985, but he decided to leave in 1986. He was politically active until 1990 when he became provincial Secretary of Local Autonomies League.

=== International relationships ===
Soncini had an important role in leading Reggio Emilia into a network of international relationships, in particular with southern African countries.

==== Mozambique ====
While Soncini was Chairman of AROER, after a visit of a FRELIMO delegation, he proposed a twinning agreement between Reggio Emilia's Hospital and the Hospital Central of Cabo Delgado to help liberated zones of Mozambique. In 1970, a pact ratified this twinning agreement and a Committee for Medical aid to Mozambican people was established and Soncini was appointed chairman. The aid project was developed with physician Silvio Pampiglione and FRELIMO's Direcçao de Saude (health care management): it was decided to send medicines, health facilities and Italian practitioners in order to assist injured people and to train local healthcare assistants.

In 1972 Soncini visited Tanzania and liberated zones of Mozambique. On that occasion Franco Cigarini filmed a documentary. Soncini returned to Mozambique in 1975 to take part to celebrations of independence from Portugal and to sign a twinning agreement between Reggio Emilia and the city of Pemba, capital of Cabo Delgado, in order to improve technical and institutional collaboration and to reinforce the collaboration and friendship with Mozambican leaders such as Samora Machel, Joaquim Chissano and Marcelino dos Santos. In 1977 the “Comitato Unitario per l’amicizia, la cooperazione e la solidarietà con i popoli” was established.

==== South Africa ====
In the same year, on 26 June, the "Pact of Solidarity between Reggio Emilia and the African National Congress" was approved and signed by the mayor Ugo Benassi and Oliver Tambo. The following year, which UN proclaimed “International Year against Apartheid”, the publication of Italian version of “Sechaba”, the official magazine of ANC, started. Soncini was managing editor of it until 1984 when the last issue was published. Sechaba helped to raise awareness of the international struggle against apartheid in Italy.

In 1978, Giuseppe Soncini organized in Reggio Emilia the “National Conference of solidarity for independence and the sovereignty of Southern Africa Peoples against colonialism, racism and apartheid”, with the participation of delegates from ANC, Sof SWAPO, of Zanu-Zapu, of Mozambique and of other Southern African countries, as well as Italian leaders. On that occasion it was decided to organize a solidarity ship for southern Africa.

In April 1979 the National Committee was established, with Soncini as Coordinator, with the purpose to realize initiatives and campaigns to help anti-colonialist movements in Africa. National and International institutions referred to this committee during those years. The Committee organized both solidarity ships Amanda (in 1980 from Genoa) and Rea Silvia (in 1984 from Livorno), bound for Namibia and South Africa respectively, with aid and facilities.

During the Eighties Giuseppe Soncini continued his activity of political and social commitment for African populations. He also promoted the conferring of honorary citizenship of Rome on Nelson Mandela in 1983.

In 1987, Soncini was invited by Oliver Tambo, ANC's Chairman, to participate at the Arusha International Conference in Tanzania, an important event dealing with democratic transition in South Africa.

=== The last years ===
In the last years of his life Soncini, with his wife Bruna Ganapini, organized his personal archive, bearing witness to his role in Reggio Emilia's community and his international solidarity work.

Giuseppe Soncini died in Parma on 4 April 1991, after a heart surgery operation. Marcelino dos Santos delivered the funeral speech and Benny Nato, as delegate of ANC in Italy, took part in the ceremony.

== Awards ==
In April 2013, Giuseppe Soncini posthumously received the Order of the Companions of O. R. Tambo bronze award, an honour conferred by South Africa to people from other countries people who have been distinguished in the fight against apartheid and solidarity with liberation movements in Southern Africa. The award was delivered to his widow, Bruna Ganapini. The citation read:

His contribution to the liberation movement by forging a Pact of Solidarity between the town of Reggio Emilia in Italy and the ANC. His town served as a haven to many anti-apartheid activists during the difficult times of oppression.

== Sources ==
- Biography of Giuseppe Soncini from Soncini-Cigarini Archive (in Italian)
