= Guia Soncini =

Italian columnist and writer (born 1972)

- Born: 19 October 1972 (age 53); Bologna, Italy
- Occupation: writer
- Years active: 1995–present

Guia Soncini (born 19 October 1972) is an Italian columnist and writer. She writes for Linkiesta and, in the past, among others for la Repubblica, Gioia, Elle Italia and Il Foglio.

== Writing ==
Soncini is a writer of both fiction and non-fiction books. After publishing Elementi di capitalismo amoroso (Italian for Elements of loving capitalism) in 2008 through Rizzoli, she chose to self-publish her book Come salvarsi il girovita (Italian for How to save your waistline), in 2012 on Amazon Kindle, debuting in the Top Ten.

Her book I mariti delle altre (Italian for Other women's husbands) chronicles both her experience with her father's infidelity from a personal perspective and the culture of adultery in Italy in general.

Her first novel, Qualunque cosa significhi amore ("Whatever love means", the notorious Charles Windsor's quote about his marriage to Diana Spencer), was published on 27 May 2015.

== Bibliography ==
- Come salvarsi il girovita (2012)
- I mariti delle altre (2014)
- La repubblica dei cuochi (2015)
- Qualunque cosa significhi amore (2015)
- L'era della suscettibilità (2021)
- L'economia del sé: Breve storia dei nuovi esibizionismi (2022)
- Questi sono i 50. La fine dell'età adulta (2023)
